= List of Alpha Phi Alpha members =

Alpha Phi Alpha is the first inter-collegiate Greek-letter organization established for Black college students. Convened in December 1905 as a literary society with the first presiding officer being CC Poindexter, it was established as a fraternity on December 4, 1906, at Ithaca, New York. Alpha Phi Alpha opened chapters at other colleges, universities, and cities, and named them with Greek letters. Members traditionally pledge into a chapter, although some members were granted honorary status before the fraternity discontinued the practice of granting honorary membership. A chapter name ending in "Lambda" denotes an alumni chapter. The only alumni chapters that do not end in "Lambda" are Rho Chapter, located in Philadelphia, as well as the Omicron Lambda Alpha chapter in Washington, D.C. and the Omicron Lambda Beta chapter in Illinois, which were both intermediate chapters but became alumni chapters after the discontinuation of intermediate chapters.

No chapter of Alpha Phi Alpha is designated Omega, the last letter of the Greek alphabet that traditionally signifies "the end". Deceased brothers are respectfully referred to as having their membership transferred to Omega Chapter, the fraternity's chapter of sweet rest. Frederick Douglass is distinguished as the only member initiated posthumously when he became an exalted honorary member of the Omega chapter in 1921.

The fraternity, through its college and alumni chapters, serves the community through nearly a thousand chapters in the United States, Europe, Africa, Asia, and the Caribbean.

The fraternity has been led by 36 general presidents. Its membership includes two premiers; four governors; a vice president, four senators; a Supreme Court justice; two presidential candidates; Nobel Prize, Pulitzer Prize, Lenin Peace Prize, Kluge Prize, Golden Globe, Academy Award, Grammy Award, and Emmy Award winners; French Légion d'honneur and Croix de Guerre laureates; at least four Rhodes Scholars; eighteen diplomats; fourteen Presidential Medal of Freedom, seven Congressional Gold Medal, and seventeen Spingarn Medal recipients; and eighteen Olympians.

Buildings, monuments, stadiums, arenas, courthouses, and schools have been named after Alpha men, such as the Martin Luther King Jr. Memorial, the Thurgood Marshall Public Policy Building at the University of Maryland; the Ernest N. Morial Convention Center in New Orleans; the Whitney Young Memorial Bridge; the Jesse Owens Memorial Stadium; the Paul Robeson Plaza at Rutgers University; the Jack Trice Stadium; the John H. Johnson School of Communication at Howard University; the Oscar W. Ritchie Pan-African Cultural Arts Center at Kent State University; the Arvarh E. Strickland General Classroom Building at the University of Missouri-Columbia; the G. Larry James Stadium at Stockton University; the Edward W. Brooke Courthouse in Boston, Massachusetts; the John H. Stroger, Jr. Hospital of Cook County; the John Hope Franklin Memorial Plaza in Tulsa, Oklahoma; the Stephan P. Mickle Sr. Courthouse in Gainesville, Florida; the Ronald V. Dellums Federal Building in Oakland, California; the Ralph H. Metcalfe Federal Building in Chicago; A. Maceo Smith High School and the A. Maceo Smith Federal Building in Dallas; the Robert F. Smith School of Chemical and Biomolecular Engineering at Cornell University; the Baltimore-Washington International Thurgood Marshall Airport; Eddie G. Robinson Memorial Stadium at Grambling State University; Hartsfield–Jackson Atlanta International Airport; and The Whitney M. Young School of Social Work at Clark Atlanta University.

== The House of Alpha ==
The House of Alpha was first published in the December 1923 edition of The Sphinx Magazine. The poem, which would later be attributed to Bro. Sidney P. Brown, quickly became a staple within the fraternity. When speaking about the poem in 1981, Brown cited his experiences with Beta (Washington, D.C.), Theta (Chicago), Xi Lambda (Chicago Alumni), and Eta Lambda (Atlanta Alumni) as collective inspirations for the poem. Loyalty to the Fraternity was repeatedly urged by brothers on the part of those who were among the initiated, and for every chapter with the vision of a fraternity house. The statement has become a manifesto for the national fraternity and chapters, as each may symbolically be referred to as a "House of Alpha".

Eugene K. Jones, sometimes referred to as "The Visionary Jewel", once said:

Alpha Phi Alpha, the oldest of Negro Fraternities, with all of its members presumably far above the average American and having a good and practical understanding of the salient factors involved in the Negro's problem...should be able to take into their hands the leadership in the Negro's struggle for status.

Here follows a list of notable Alphas.

== Founders ==
Name	Original chapter	Notability	Ref.
Henry Arthur Callis	Alpha	Co-founder of Alpha Phi Alpha fraternity; 6th general president of Alpha Phi Alpha; physician	
Charles Henry Chapman	Alpha	Co-founder of Alpha Phi Alpha fraternity; Professor of Agriculture at FAMU	
Eugene Kinckle Jones	Alpha	Co-founder of Alpha Phi Alpha fraternity; first executive director of the National Urban League; member of President Franklin D Roosevelt's Black Cabinet	
George Biddle Kelley	Alpha	Co-founder of Alpha Phi Alpha fraternity; first Black licensed engineer of New York	
Nathaniel Allison Murray	Alpha	Co-founder of Alpha Phi Alpha fraternity; career educator	
Robert Harold Ogle	Alpha	Co-founder of Alpha Phi Alpha fraternity; professional staff member to the US Congressional Committee on Appropriations	
Vertner Woodson Tandy	Alpha	Co-founder of Alpha Phi Alpha; architect, whose most famous commission was the mansion of Harlem millionaire Madam C.J. Walker	

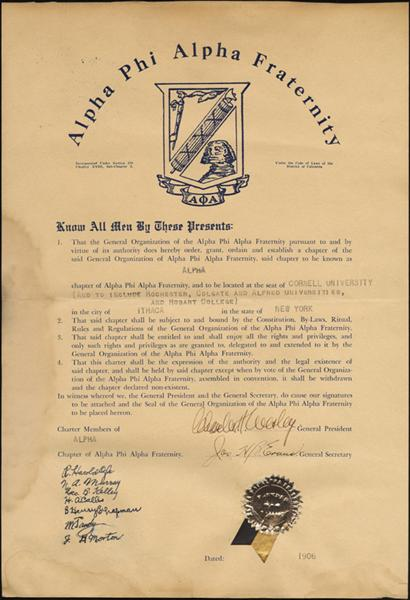
Charter for Alpha Phi Alpha's Alpha chapter with signatures of founders, Cornell University, circa 1906

== Academia ==
=== Presidents ===
Name	Original chapter	Notability	Ref.
Herman Branson	Beta Gamma	President of Central State University and Lincoln University; co-discoverer of the alpha helix; sickle-cell physicist	
James P. Brawley	Alpha Delta	President of Clark College	
Calvin Burnett	Delta Lambda	President of Coppin State University	
Julius Chambers	Gamma Beta	Attorney who argued in the Supreme Court case styled Swann v. Charlotte-Mecklenburg Board of Education; third Director-Counsel of the NAACP Legal Defense and Educational Fund; president of North Carolina Central University	
James Cheek	Beta Rho	President of Howard University	
Thomas W. Cole Jr.	Alpha Sigma	First president of Clark Atlanta University, president of West Virginia State University, interim chancellor of University of Massachusetts Amherst	
Thomas W. Cole Sr.	Alpha Sigma	President of Wiley College; 21st general president of Alpha Phi Alpha	
Matthew Simpson Davage	Alpha Phi	President of Clark College, now Clark Atlanta University	
William B. Delauder	Beta Alpha	President of Delaware State University	
James Douglas	Delta Theta	President of Texas Southern University	
John Malcus Ellison	Gamma	First African American president of Virginia Union University, 1941	
Elson S. Floyd	Mu Zeta	First African American president of three universities: Western Michigan University, the University of Missouri, and Washington State University	
Luther H. Foster Jr.	Beta Gamma	Fourth president of Tuskegee University	
Luther H. Foster Sr.	Gamma Phi	President of Virginia State University	
Norman Francis	Sigma Lambda	President of Xavier University; President of Louisiana Recovery Authority; 2006 Presidential Medal of Freedom recipient	
Robert Michael Franklin Jr.	Eta Lambda	President of Morehouse College	
James R. Gavin	Gamma Mu	President of Morehouse School of Medicine	
Hugh Gloster	Alpha Rho	President of Morehouse College and physician	
George W. Gore	Tau Lambda	Fifth president of Florida A&M University; interim president of Fisk University; founder of Alpha Kappa Mu honor society	
Ervin V. Griffin Sr.	Beta Theta	President of West Virginia State College	
William H. Hale	Beta Kappa	President of Langston University	
Jaffus Hardrick	Zeta Xi	14th president of Florida Memorial University	
G. Lamar Harrison	Beta	President of Langston University	
Cornelius Henderson	Alpha Phi	President of Gammon Theological Seminary	
Charles A. Hines	Beta	President of Prairie View A&M University; major general	
Ernest Holloway	Beta Kappa	14th president of Langston University	
John Hope	Eta Lambda	First Black president of Morehouse College; president of Atlanta University; co-founder of the Niagara Movement and NAACP; fourth president of the Association for the Study of African American Life and History; 1936 Spingarn Medal recipient	
Freeman A. Hrabowski III	Gamma Iota	President of the University of Maryland, Baltimore County; social activist	
Frederick S. Humphries	Beta Nu	Eighth president of Florida A&M University	
William P. Hytche Sr.	Beta Kappa	President of University of Maryland Eastern Shore	
Charles S. Johnson	Gamma	Editor of the National Urban League's Opportunity magazine; first Black president of Fisk University	
Walter M. Kimbrough	Zeta Pi	President of Dillard University; author	
Raphael Lanier	Mu Lambda	United States Ambassador to Liberia; first president of Texas Southern University	
Thomas F. Law	Delta Rho	First president of Saint Paul's College	
John H. Lewis	Zeta	President of Morris Brown College	
Joseph T. McMillan Jr.	Beta	First president of Huston–Tillotson College	
John A. Middleton	Nu Eta Lambda	President of Morris Brown College	
Luna Mishoe	Alpha Pi Lambda	President of Delaware State University	
Elfred A. Packard	Chi Lambda	22nd president of Wilberforce University	
Frederick D. Patterson	Alpha Nu	Third president of Tuskegee University; co-founder of the United Negro College Fund (UNCF); 1987 Presidential Medal of Freedom; 1988 Spingarn Medal recipient	
Benjamin F. Payton	Beta Delta	Fifth president of Tuskegee University	
Henry Ponder	Beta Kappa	President of Talladega College, Fisk University and Benedict College; 28th general president of Alpha Phi Alpha; vice chairman of the World Policy Council	
Earl Richardson	Delta Nu	President of Morgan State University	
John B. Slaughter	Kappa Tau	President of University of Maryland and Occidental College; first African American director of the National Science Foundation	
Kent J. Smith Jr.	Beta Sigma	16th president of Langston University	
William F. Tate IV	Epsilon Phi	First Black president of Louisiana State University; president of Rutgers University	
Ronald Temple	Delta Gamma Lambda	President of City Colleges of Chicago	
Jack Thomas	Tau Lambda	11th president of Western Illinois University; first African American president of WIU; author; national and international keynote speaker/lecturer	
Gregory J. Vincent	Alpha Rho Lambda	President of Hobart College and William Smith College; professor; attorney, civil rights and social justice expert	
Walter Washington	Gamma Upsilon	President of Alcorn State University; 24th general president of Alpha Phi Alpha	
Charles H. Wesley	Zeta	President of Central State University; president of Wilberforce University; executive director and president of the Association for the Study of Negro Life and History (ASALH); 14th general president and historian of Alpha Phi Alpha	
Darrell K. Williams	Gamma Iota	President of Hampton University; Lieutenant general, commanding general of combined arms and senior mission commander at Fort Lee, Virginia	
Sidney David Williams	Beta Zeta	Fourth president of Elizabeth City State University	

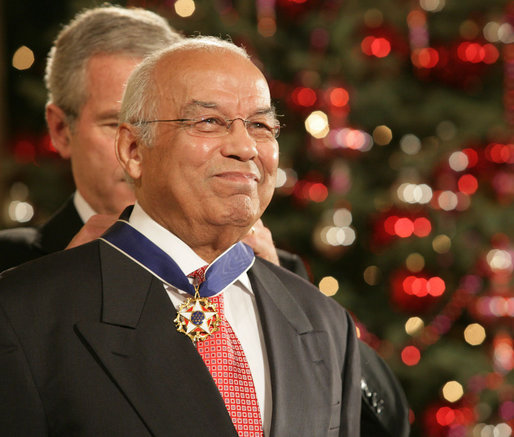
Norman Francis

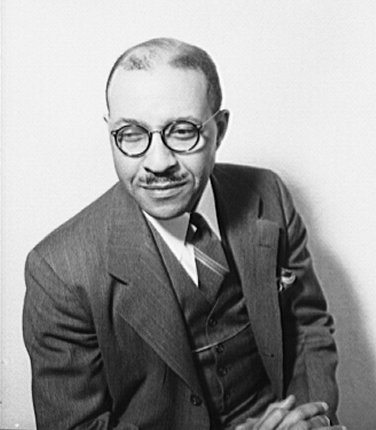
Charles S. Johnson

=== Professors ===
Name	Original chapter	Notability	Ref.
David H. Blackwell	Tau	Professor of Mathematics, University of California, Berkeley (UC Berkeley); first Black person admitted to the National Academy of Sciences; first tenured black professor in UC Berkeley history; former chair of the Department of Statistics	
William Jelani Cobb	Kappa Phi Lambda	Professor of Journalism at Columbia University; former Professor of History and director of the Institute for African American Studies at the University of Connecticut; author of The Substance of Hope; staff writer at The New Yorker magazine; contributor to MSNBC TV; dean of the Columbia University School of Journalism	
Kevin Cokley	Xi Eta	Author of The Myth of Black Anti-Intellectualism; former editor-in-chief of the Journal of Black Psychology; University of Texas at Austin educational psychology professor; first Black person admitted to the University of Texas System Academy of Distinguished Teachers; Association of Black Psychologists Distinguished Psychologist	
William P. Foster	Upsilon	Creator of the Florida A&M University Marching "100" Band	
John Hope Franklin	Alpha Chi	professor and chair of the history department at the University of Chicago; chair of the history department at Duke University; author of From Slavery To Freedom; namesake of the John Hope Franklin Memorial Plaza at the site of the Tulsa, Oklahoma "Black Wall Street" massacre and race riot	
E. Franklin Frazier	Delta Nu Lambda	Sociologist; author of The Negro Family, Black Bourgeoisie, and On Race Relations; Fisk University Professor; recipient of 1940 Anisfield-Wolf Book Award for the most significant work in the field of race relations; Guggenheim Fellowship Award recipient	
Hamilton E. Holmes	Alpha Rho	professor of orthopedics and associate dean at Emory University School of Medicine	
Hobart Jarrett	Alpha Sigma	Member of the Wiley College Debate Team that in 1935 defeated the University of Southern California national champions; professor and chair of the Humanities Division at Bennett College	
Elgy Johnson	Alpha Omicron	Mathematician and professor at the University of the District of Columbia and Federal City College	
Kelly Miller	Beta (honorary)	mathematician, sociologist, dean of the College of Arts and Sciences at Howard University, and author of books, newspaper, and magazine articles, and essays	
James A. Porter	Beta	Scholar whose book Modern Negro Art became a standard reference work on Black art in America	
J. Marshall Shepherd	Iota Delta	professor at the University of Georgia Department of Geography, director of the University of Georgia atmospheric sciences program, and research meteorologist at the Goddard Space Flight Center	
Warren Washington	Epsilon Zeta Lambda	Climate change scientist; 2007 Nobel Peace Prize for Science recipient; first African American president of the American Meteorological Society; awarded 2010 National Medal of Science by President Barack Obama; presidential advisor to Presidents Carter, Reagan, Clinton, and both Bushes; professor of climatology at the University of Oregon	
Robert E. Weems Jr.	Theta	Willard W. Garvey Distinguished Professor of Business History at Wichita State University; acclaimed for extensive and systematic research on African American consumerism; lecturer and author of books on the economic history of African Americans, including Black Business in the Black Metropolis, Desegregating the Dollar, and Business in Black and White	
Cornel West	Zeta Beta Lambda	Professor of religion at Harvard and Princeton; author and social activist	
Roger L. Youmans	Upsilon	Surgeon; University of California Berkeley medical professor; author of When Elephants Fight: An American Surgeon's Chronicle of Congo	

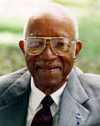
John Franklin

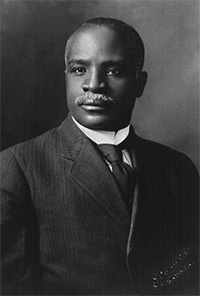
Kelly Miller

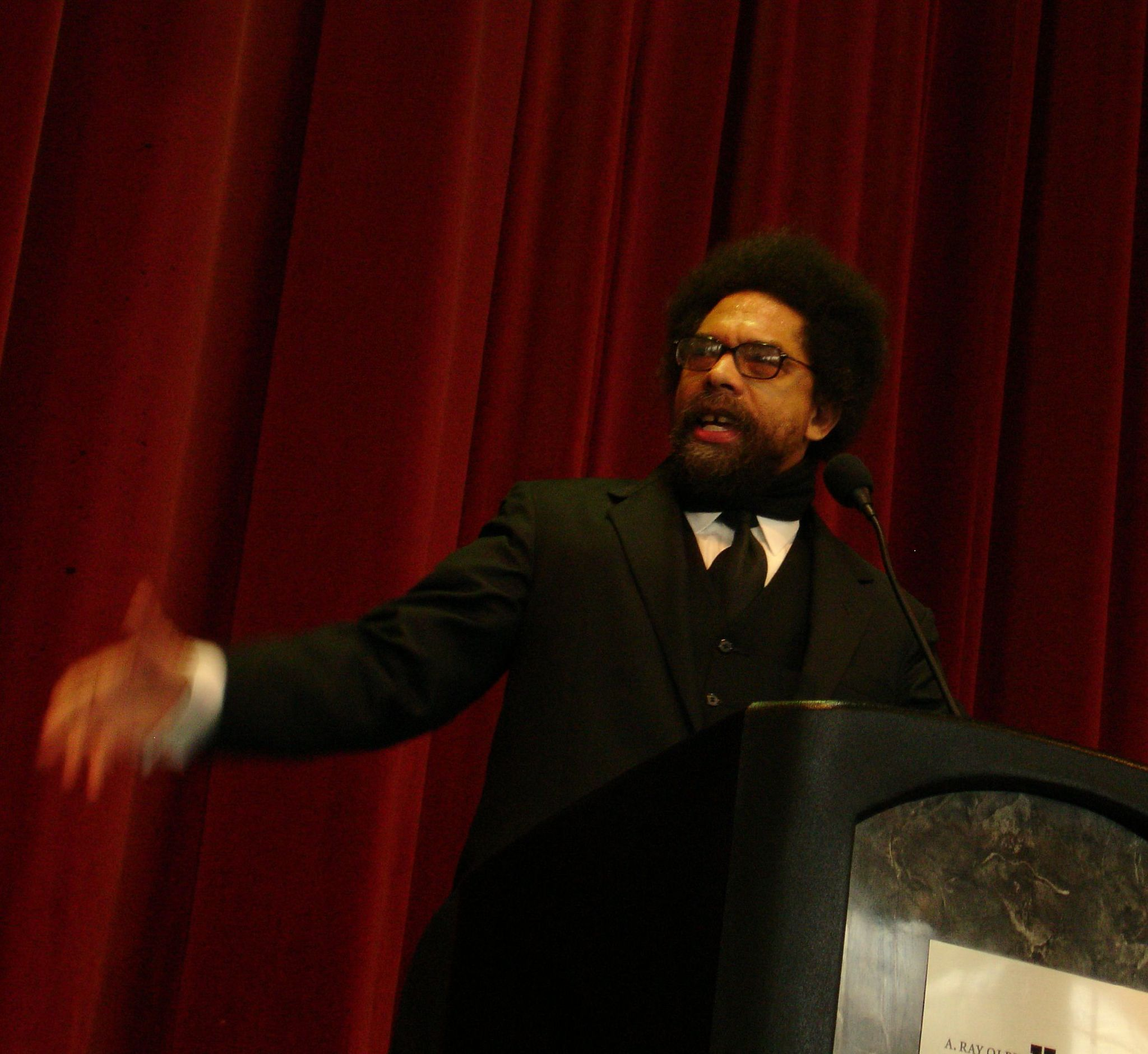
Cornel West

== Art and architecture ==
Name	Original chapter	Notability	Ref.
Albert I. Cassell	Alpha	Architect, designed buildings for Howard University, Morgan State University, and Virginia State University	
Cornelius Langston Henderson	Epsilon	Structural engineer and bridge builder; designed the Canadian approach to the Ambassador Bridge linking the U.S. and Canada; designed and built the Detroit-Windsor Tunnel, the first vehicular subway tunnel (under the Detroit River) between two nations	
Hilyard Robinson	Eta	Architect; designed buildings for Howard University, Hampton University and Langston Terrace Dwellings in Washington, D.C.; architect of Tuskegee, Alabama Army Airfield; first and only African American to design a US airbase	

== Business ==
Name	Original chapter	Notability	Ref.
Jesse Binga	Theta (honorary)	Founder of Binga State Bank in Chicago	
Theodore Colbert III	Gamma Lambda	CEO, Boeing Defense, Space & Security	
Brett J. Hart	Epsilon	CEO and president of United Airlines	
Alonzo F. Herndon	Eta Lambda (honorary)	Founder and president of Atlanta Life Insurance; namesake of the Alonzo Herndon Stadium at Morris Brown College	
Norris Herndon	Sigma	President of Atlanta Life Insurance	
Eugene Jackson	Epsilon Psi	CEO of World African Network	
John H. Johnson	Theta	Founder of Johnson Publishing Company, which publishes Ebony and Jet magazines; the first Black person to appear on the Forbes 400 "Rich List"; namesake of Howard University's School of Communications;	
Randy Parker	Eta Psi	CEO Hyundai Automotive Corporation North America	
Henry G. Parks Jr.	Kappa	Founder of Parks Sausage	
William F. Pickard	Epsilon Xi	founder and executive chairman of GAA Manufacturing and Supply Chain Management; co-managing partner at MGM Grand Detroit Casino,	
Samuel Pierce	Alpha	Secretary of Housing and Urban Development; argued before the United States Supreme Court on behalf of Martin Luther King Jr. and The New York Times in the important First Amendment case styled New York Times v. Sullivan; first African-American to serve on the board of directors of a Fortune 500 company	
Johnathan A. Rodgers	Alpha Epsilon	CEO of TV One; president of CBS Television Stations; executive producer for the CBS Morning News and weekend evening newscasts	
Joshua I. Smith	Delta Xi	CEO of Maxima Corporation	
Robert F. Smith	Alpha	Founder of Vista Equity Partners; namesake of the School of Chemical and Biomolecular Engineering at Cornell University	
Everette Taylor	Theta Iota	CEO of PopSocial, co-founder of GrowthHackers	
Don Thompson	Gamma Rho	CEO and president of McDonald's, worldwide	

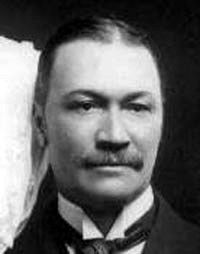
Alonzo Herndon

== Entertainment ==
=== Music ===
Name	Original chapter	Notability	Ref.
Cannonball Adderley	Beta Nu	Jazz saxophonist	
Gerald Albright	Iota Chi	Jazz saxophonist	
Jerry Butler	Xi Lambda	Songwriter, composer; former lead singer of The Impressions; 1991 inductee into the Rock and Roll Hall of Fame; 1993 NAACP Image Award Hall of Fame inductee	
Duke Ellington	Alpha Zeta Lambda	Composer, bandleader, actor; Grammy Award winner; 1959 Spingarn Medal and 1969 Presidential Medal of Freedom recipient; Pulitzer Prize in recognition of his musical genius	
Marc Gay	Beta	Singer in the R&B group Shai	
Lionel Hampton	Phi	Jazz percussionist and bandleader; National Medal of Arts recipient; Goodwill Ambassador for the United States	
Antonio Hart	Sigma	Jazz saxophonist	
Donny Hathaway	Beta	Songwriter and arranger for The Staple Singers, Jerry Butler, and Aretha Franklin; singer who recorded duets with Roberta Flack; recorded the theme song to the TV series Maude	
Fletcher Henderson	Alpha Phi	Pianist, bandleader, arranger and composer, important in the development of big band jazz and swing music	
Carl Martin	Beta	Singer in the R&B group Shai	
Lionel Richie	Alpha Nu Lambda	Singer and member of the Commodores; Grammy Award and Academy Award winner; 2003 Hollywood Walk of Fame honoree	
Noble Sissle	Theta	Jazz composer, lyricist, bandleader, and singer of the Harlem Renaissance; lyricist of Shuffle Along, which became the first hit musical on Broadway written by and about African-Americans	
Darnell Van Rensalier	Beta	Singer in the R&B group Shai	

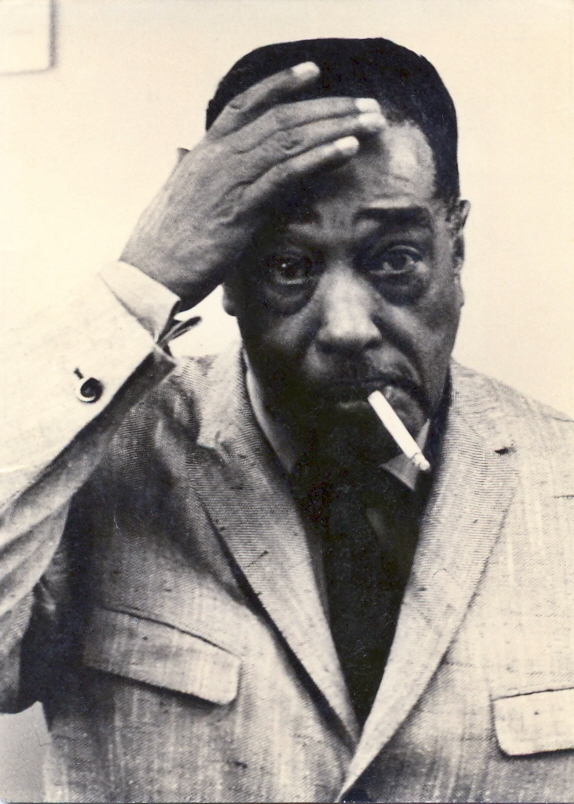
Duke Ellington

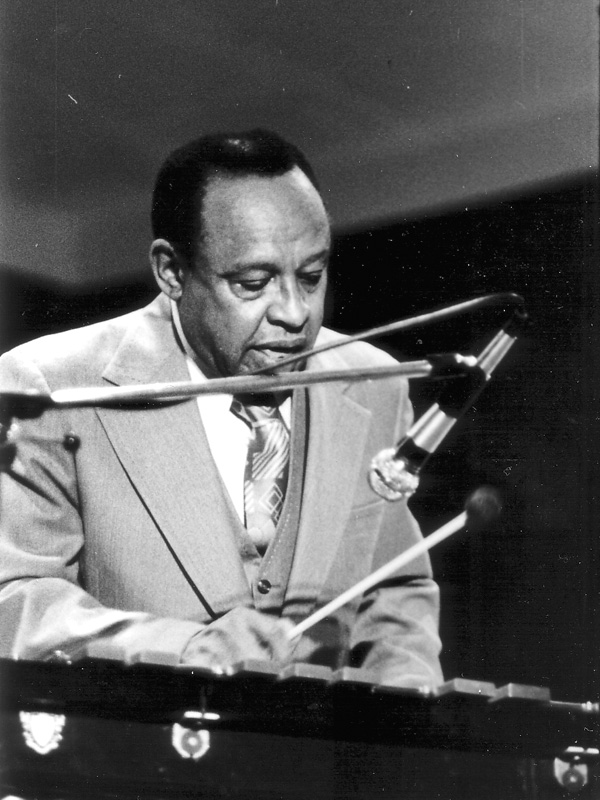
Lionel Hampton

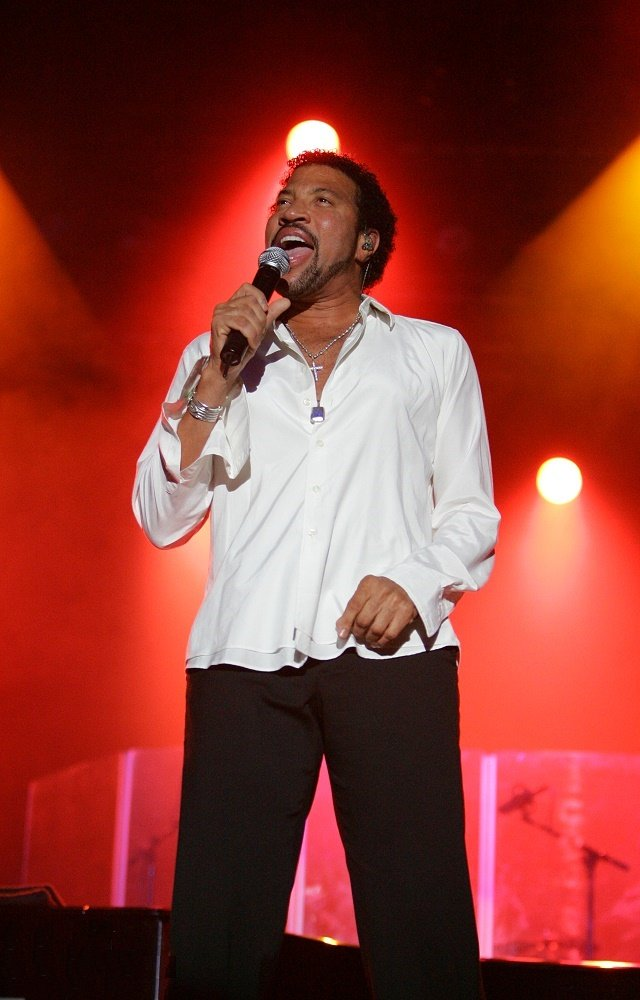
Lionel Richie

=== Television, film, and theater ===
Name	Original chapter	Notability	Ref.
Yahya Abdul-Mateen II	Alpha Epsilon	Actor, best known for Candyman, The Get Down, The Greatest Showman, Baywatch, Aquaman, Watchmen; 2020 Emmy Award winner for Best Supporting Actor	
Darryl M. Bell	Delta Zeta	Actor, best known for A Different World	
Benny Boom	Pi Rho	Director of music videos; director of 2017 Tupac biography movie All Eyez On Me	
Rusty Cundieff	Alpha Delta	Actor, writer; director of Tales from the Hood and Chappelle's Show; correspondent on TV Nation	
Rel Dowdell	Alpha Chi	Writer and director of feature films Train Ride and Changing the Game	
Todd Duncan	Mu Lambda	First Black person to sing with a major opera company; the original Porgy in George Gershwin's Porgy and Bess; 1984 George Peabody Medal of Music recipient	
Sean Freeman	Pi Lambda	Principal actor on Beyond The Gates	
Andra Fuller	Tau Alpha	Actor, best known for Black Jesus, RoomieLoverFriends, The L.A. Complex	
Gary Hardwick	Epsilon	Producer, screenwriter, director of The Brothers, Deliver Us from Eva, Radio, and Bring It On	
Omari Hardwick	Zeta Pi	Actor in Saved, Dark Blue, Power, and The A-Team	
Rob Hardy	Beta Nu	Film director, film producer, screenwriter, and television director	
Hill Harper	Kappa Phi Lambda	Actor on The Good Doctor, CSI: NY; author of Letters to a Young Brother	
Adrian Holmes	Tau Epsilon Lambda	Actor, best known for Uncle Phil in the Bel-Air, won a Canadian Screen Award for Best Actor in a Continuing Leading Dramatic Role	
Barry Jenkins	Iota Delta	First African American director to win an Oscar Academy Award for Best Picture (Moonlight); director of 2019 Golden Globe Award-winning movie If Beale Street Could Talk	
Christian Keyes	Zeta Beta	Television and movie actor, singer, and model; Diary of a Mad Black Woman, Let's Stay Together, Moonlight, Sex Chronicles	
William Packer	Beta Nu	Producer and director of films, including The Gospel, Pandora's Box, Stomp the Yard, Trois, and Roots (2016 remake); first African American to produce the Academy Awards Oscar presentations ceremony (2022)	
Joseph C. Phillips	Iota Zeta Lambda	Actor on The Cosby Show, General Hospital, and Strictly Business; political commentator on NPR's News and Notes with Ed Gordon	
Randal Pinkett	Kappa Phi Lambda	Fourth winner of NBC's reality show The Apprentice; Rhodes Scholar	
Kevin Powell	Zeta Eta	Cast member of The Real World: New York; political activist; poet; writer; entrepreneur	
Tim Reid	Eta Lambda	Actor, Sister, Sister, WKRP in Cincinnati, That '70s Show	
Paul Robeson	Nu	NFL player; actor; singer; attorney; social activist, 1945 Spingarn Medal recipient; Stalin Peace Prize laureate	
Terrell Tilford	Alpha Epsilon	Television and movie actor, Soul Food, Days Of Our Lives, Guiding Light, One Life To Live, The Protector	
Keenen Ivory Wayans	Gamma Phi	Creator of comedy series In Living Color; actor, comedian, writer, director; Emmy Award winner	
Tyriq Withers	Iota Delta	Actor, best known for Him (2025 film); The CW's Legacies, Tell Me Lies, and The Game.	

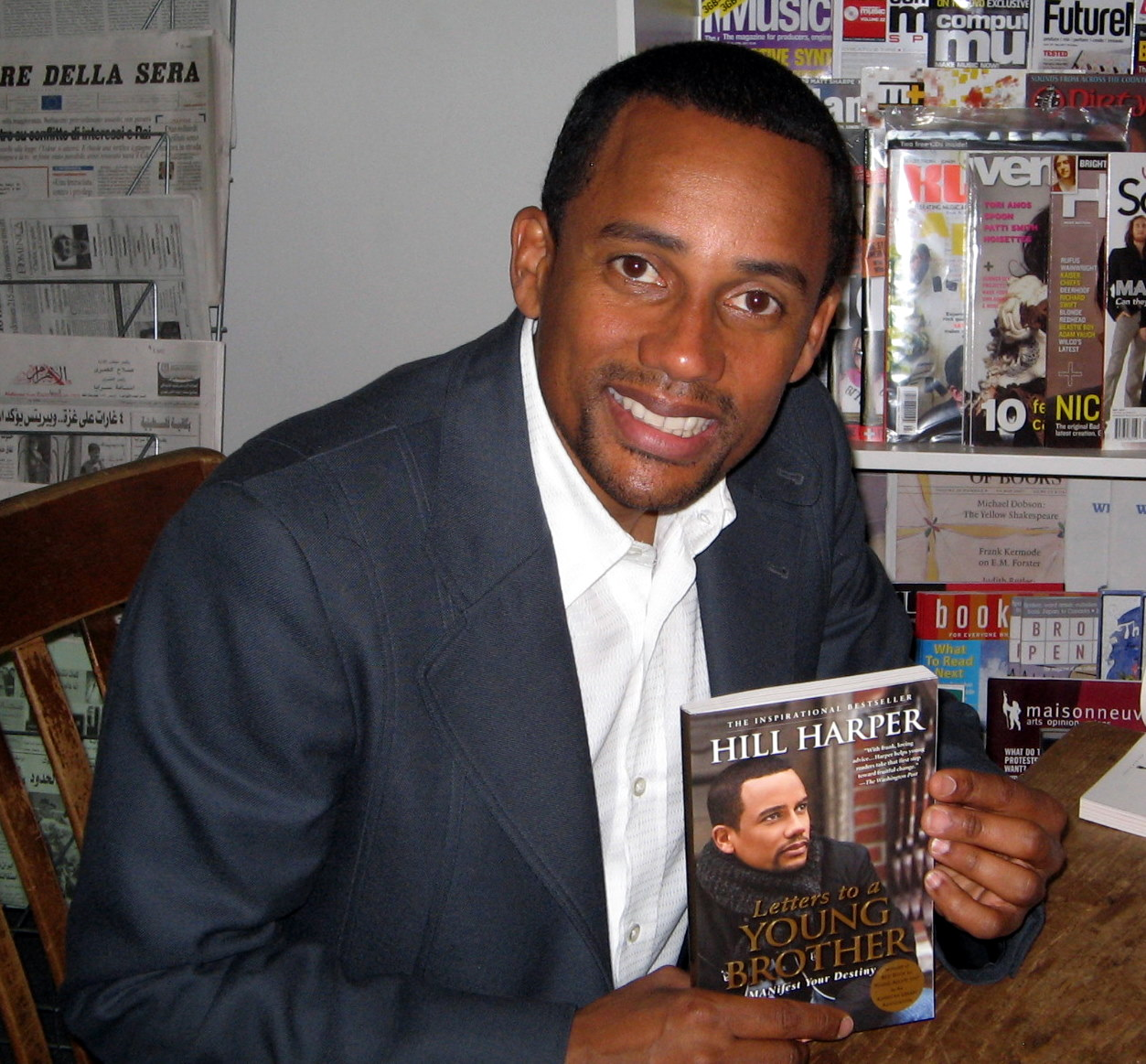
Hill Harper

Paul Robeson

== Journalists and media personalities ==
Name	Original chapter	Notability	Ref.
Tony Brown	Alpha Upsilon	Commentator on the syndicated television show Tony Brown's Journal; founding dean of Howard University's School of Communication	
Malvin Russell Goode	Omicron	First Black news correspondent for ABC as a United Nations reporter	
Jay Harris	Nu Theta	Sportscaster for ESPN on SportsCenter and ESPNEWS	
Corey Hébert	Alpha Rho	Celebrity physician, radio talk show host, chief medical editor for National Broadcasting Company for the Gulf Coast, first Black chief resident of Pediatrics at Tulane University, chief executive officer of Community Health TV	
Roland S. Martin	Pi Omicron	Editor of the Chicago Defender; radio talk show host; contributor to CNN; anchor for TV One network news	
Harry McAlpin	Gamma Epsilon	First African American White House Press Correspondent; CBS National (DC) reporter; journalist; attorney	
Lu Palmer	Alpha Kappa	Chicago Sun-Times columnist; community activist; campaign manager for Harold Washington mayoral race	
Emmett Jay Scott	Honorary	journalist, co-founder and editor of the Texas Freeman, academic, and special advisor of Black affairs to the United States Secretary of War	
Stuart Scott	Mu Zeta	Sportscaster for ESPN on SportsCenter	
Chuck Stone	Alpha Kappa	Speechwriter for Adam Clayton Powell Jr.; first president of the National Association of Black Journalists; Tuskegee Airman	
Lewis Ossie Swingler	Beta Beta	Editor of the Sphinx; editor in chief of the Memphis World; co-founder and editor in chief of the Tri-State Defender; southern vice president of Alpha Phi Alpha during the Montgomery bus boycott	
Pierre Thomas	Theta Iota	ABC Network News Senior Justice Correspondent; 2012 National Association of Black Journalists (NABJ) Journalist of the Year Award winner; two-time Emmy Award winner (2001 and 2009); winner of the George Foster Peabody and Alfred I DuPont Awards	
Stan Verrett	Beta	Sportscaster for ESPN on SportsCenter and ESPNEWS	

== Law ==
Name	Original chapter	Notability	Ref.
David Bailey	Gamma Beta	2017 Public Safety Officer Medal of Valor recipient; Special Agent of the United States Capitol Police who prevented a massacre of members of the United States Congress during an attack in Alexandria, Virginia	
Robert Benham	Eta Lambda	Chief Justice of the Supreme Court of Georgia	
Abraham Bolden	Alpha Psi	First African-American U.S. Secret Service agent assigned to the White House detail (John F. Kennedy); author of The Echo from Dealey Plaza	
Joe Brown	Kappa Eta	Host of the syndicated show Judge Joe Brown; presided over James Earl Ray's last appeal for Ray's conviction for the assassination of Martin Luther King Jr.	
Robert L. Carter	Nu	Pivotal role in Sweatt v. Painter, Brown v. Board of Education, and NAACP v. Alabama; US District Court Judge; 2004 Spingarn Medal recipient; Federal District Appellate Judge	
U. W. Clemon	Omicron Lambda	U.S Federal District Court Judge for Alabama	
Christopher Darden	Epsilon Mu	Prosecutor in the murder trial of O. J. Simpson	
Milton C. Davis	Gamma Phi	Assistant Attorney General of the state of Alabama who researched and wrote opinions which led Governor George Wallace to pardon Clarence Norris, the last known surviving defendant in the international cause célèbre case of the Scottsboro Boys; 29th general president of Alpha Phi Alpha	
Harry T. Edwards	Theta Zeta Lambda	Justice for the United States Court of Appeals for the District of Columbia Circuit	
Jerome Farris	Alpha Rho	First Black Federal Judge appointed to the 9th Circuit Court of Appeals	
Ernest A. Finney Jr.	Delta Alpha	Chief Justice of the South Carolina Supreme Court; South Carolina House of Representatives; Interim President of South Carolina State University; attorney in the civil rights case styled The Friendship 9	
Charles Hamilton Houston	Sigma	Chief architect of the NAACP Legal Defense Fund's strategy for racial equality in dismantling the Jim Crow laws; first Black editor of the Harvard Law Review; 1950 Spingarn Medal recipient	
Charles P. Howard Sr.	Gamma Phi	Co-founder of the National Bar Association, the oldest and largest organization of African American Attorneys	
Harry E. Johnson	Beta Tau	President of the Washington, D.C. Martin Luther King Jr. National Memorial Project Foundation, Inc., which oversees the fundraising, design, and construction of the Martin Luther King Jr. Memorial; 31st general president of Alpha Phi Alpha	
Damon Keith	Alpha Zeta	Chief Justice of the United States District Court for the Eastern District of Michigan who famously ruled in United States v. Sinclair (upheld in United States v. US District Court) that President Nixon's Attorney General John Mitchell had to disclose the transcripts of illegal wiretaps that Mitchell had authorized without first obtaining a search warrant; 1974 Spingarn Medal recipient	
Belford Lawson Jr.	Epsilon	Co-founder of New Negro Alliance; successfully argued in United States Supreme Court cases styled New Negro Alliance v. Sanitary Grocery Co. to safeguard the right to boycott, and Henderson v. United States which abolished segregation in railroad dining cars; 16th general president of Alpha Phi Alpha	
Robert A. Molloy	Zeta Omicron Lambda	Judge of the District Court of the Virgin Islands	
Thurgood Marshall	Nu	First African American justice of US Supreme Court; attorney in the landmark case Brown v. Board of Education of Topeka; first Director-Counsel of the NAACP Legal Defense Fund; 1946 Spingarn Medal and 1993 Presidential Medal of Freedom recipient; authored the constitution for the newly independent African nation of Kenya	
Greg Mathis	Gamma Lambda	Host of television series Judge Mathis	
Aubrey E. Robinson Jr.	Alpha	U.S. Federal District Judge for the District of Columbia (DC)	
Jawn Sandifer	Alpha Omicron	Chief Justice of the New York Supreme Court; one of two staff lawyers for the NAACP who successfully argued Henderson v. United States	
Michael A. Shipp	Delta Iota	Nominated as a judge for the US District Court for the District of New Jersey by President Obama on January 23, 2012	
Arthur Shores	Alpha Beta	Attorney in Lucy v. Adams, which prevented the University of Alabama from denying admission to applicants solely on account of race or color; civil rights activist; namesake of the Arthur Davis Shores Law Center and A. D. Shores Park in Birmingham, Alabama	
Charles Z. Smith	Beta Nu	First African-American to serve as justice of the Washington Supreme Court	
A. P. Tureaud	Beta	Attorney in Garner v. Louisiana, which legalized sit-in protests at segregated private businesses and restaurants	
Reggie B. Walton	Alpha Zeta	Federal Judge of the United States District Court for the District of Columbia	
Horace Ward	Alpha Rho	Senator of Georgia; first African American to serve on the federal bench in Georgia	

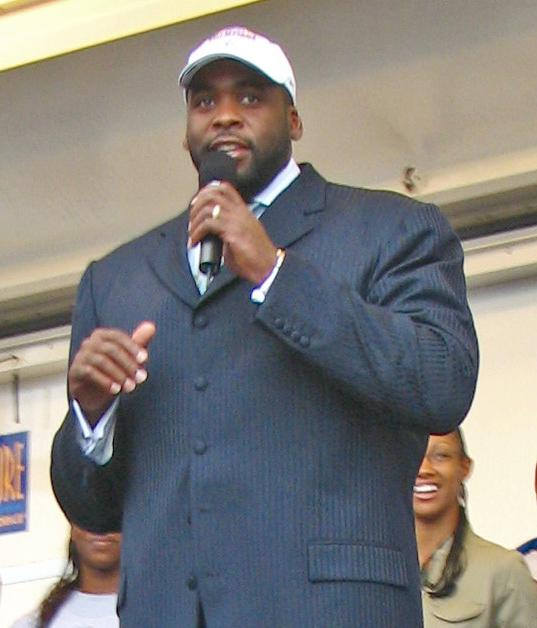
Kwame Kilpatrick

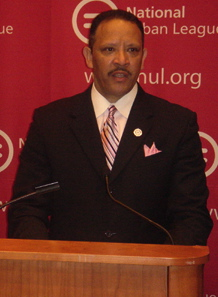
Marc Morial

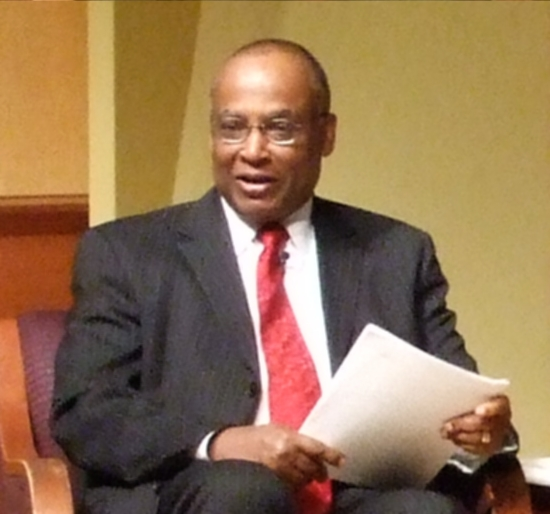
Norm Rice

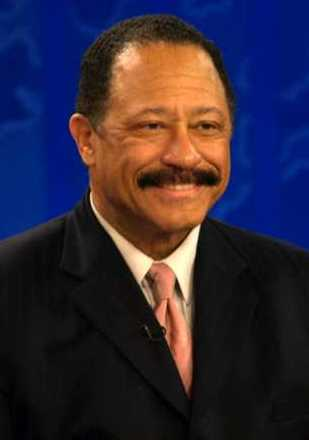
Joe Brown

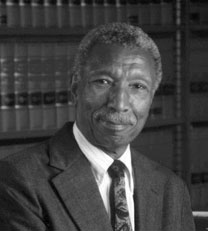
Robert Carter

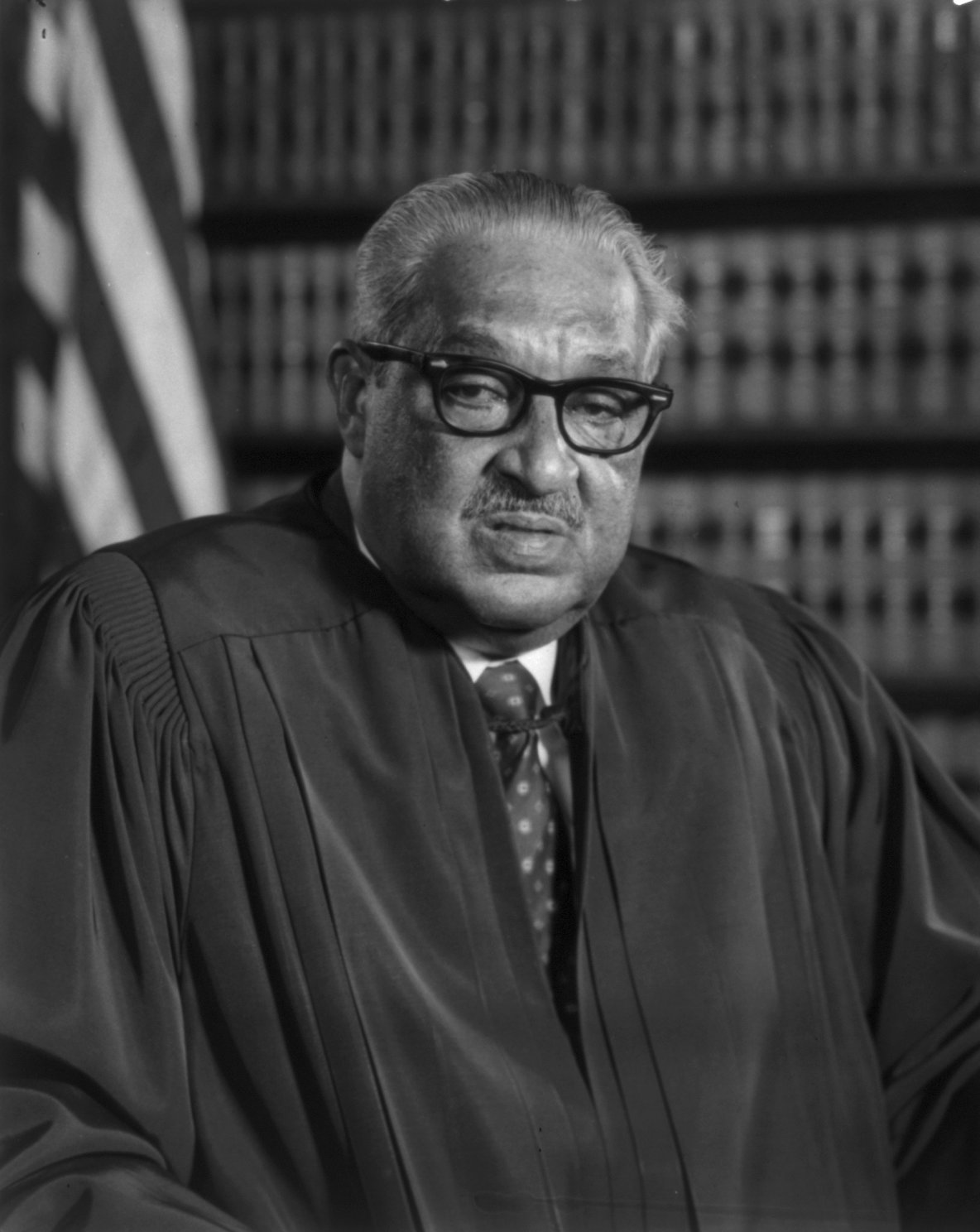
Thurgood Marshall

== Literature ==
Name	Original chapter	Notability	Ref.
Countee Cullen	Eta	Poet of the Harlem Renaissance	
Eric Jerome Dickey	Kappa Eta	Author	
E. Lynn Harris	Kappa Kappa	Author, playwright	
Chester Himes	Kappa	Author whose works include If He Hollers Let Him Go and a series of Harlem Detective novels	
E. Frederic Morrow	Alpha Alpha Lambda	First African American to hold an executive position at the White House as Administrative Officer for Special Projects; NAACP field secretary; CBS TV writer; author of Black Man in the White House, Way Down South Up North, Forty Years a Guinea Pig, and A Black Man's View From the Top	
Lawrence Ross	Alpha Epsilon	Author of The Divine Nine: The History of African American Fraternities and Sororities	
Carl Weber	Beta Gamma	Author	
Frank Yerby	Theta	Best-selling author	

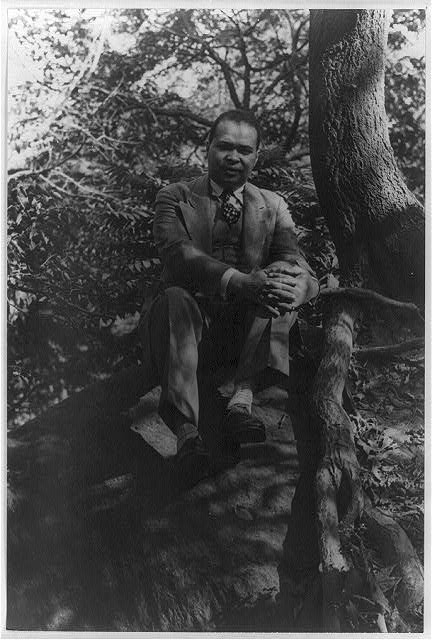
Countee Cullen

== Military ==
Name	Original chapter	Notability	Ref.
Terrence Adams	Upsilon Eta	Brigadier general, United States Air Force	
Ronald L. Bailey	Zeta Lambda	Major general, United States Marine Corps; first African American commander of the 1st Marine Division	
William Banton	Beta	First Black brigadier general in the USAF; clinical faculty member of the Saint Louis University School of Medicine and Washington University School of Medicine; first African American president of the St. Louis Metropolitan Medical Society	
Arnold Gordon Bray	Zeta Gamma	Brigadier general; United States Army	
David L. Brewer III	Gamma Zeta	Admiral, United States Navy; superintendent of L.A. Unified School District, community activist	
Charles Q. Brown	Eta Upsilon	Four-star general; chairman, Joint Chiefs of Staff; previously U.S. Air Force Chief of Staff; 1st African American military service chief	
Wesley A. Brown	Sigma	Lieutenant Commander; first Black graduate from United States Naval Academy; the Wesley A. Brown Field House at the US Naval Academy is named in his honor	
Alvin Bryant	Zeta Lambda	Brigadier general; U.S. Army	
Roscoe Cartwright	Zeta Alpha	General, United States Army, founder of ROCKs, Inc., an international organization for U.S Armed Forces commissioned officers	
Anthony J. Cotton	Eta Omicron	United States Air Force four-star general, U.S. Air Force Global Strike Force Commander, Strategic Air Command	
Victor Daly	Alpha	French Croix de Guerre recipient; novelist and author	
Gracus K. Dunn	Nu Alpha	Brigadier general, United States Army	
Amos M. Gailliard Jr.	Zeta Zeta Lambda	One-star general, United States Army, New York Guard	
Walter E. Gaskin	Delta Eta	Three-star general, United States Marine Corps	
Fred A. Gorden	Mu Beta Lambda	Brigadier general; first African-American first captain of the West Point Academy	
Samuel L. Gravely Jr.	Gamma	First African American admiral, United States Navy; first African American to command a US fleet; the Arleigh Burke-class warship USS Gravely (DDG 107) was named in his honor and commissioned on November 20, 2010	
Benjamin Thurman Hacker	Epsilon Mu Lambda	Rear admiral, United States Navy	
Edward Honor	Beta Sigma	Lieutenant general, United States Army	
Prince C. Johnson III	Eta Epsilon Lambda	Brigadier general, Deputy Chief of Staff (DCOS), Armed Forces of Liberia	
James F. McCall	Psi	United States Army lieutenant general and Comptroller	
Charles McGee	Tau	Colonel, United States Air Force; original Tuskegee Airman and 30-year career officer in the USAF; holds an Air Force record 409 fighter combat missions flown in World War II, Korea, and Vietnam; awarded the Distinguished Flying Cross, Legion of Merit, Bronze Star, Air Medal, and Army Commendation Medals; awarded the Congressional Gold Medal by President George W. Bush in 2007; inducted into the National Aviation Hall of Fame in 2011; promoted to brigadier general in 2019	
Winston E. Scott	Alpha Phi Lambda	Astronaut, Johnson Space Center	
Ronald D. Sullivan	Beta	Brigadier general	
William J. Walker	Theta Psi Lambda	Major general, United States Army, commanding general, District of Columbia National Guard	
Bobby Wilks	Alpha Eta	First African American Coast Guard aviator; first African American to reach the rank of Coast Guard captain	
Johnnie E. Wilson	Theta Theta Lambda	Four-star general, United States Army	

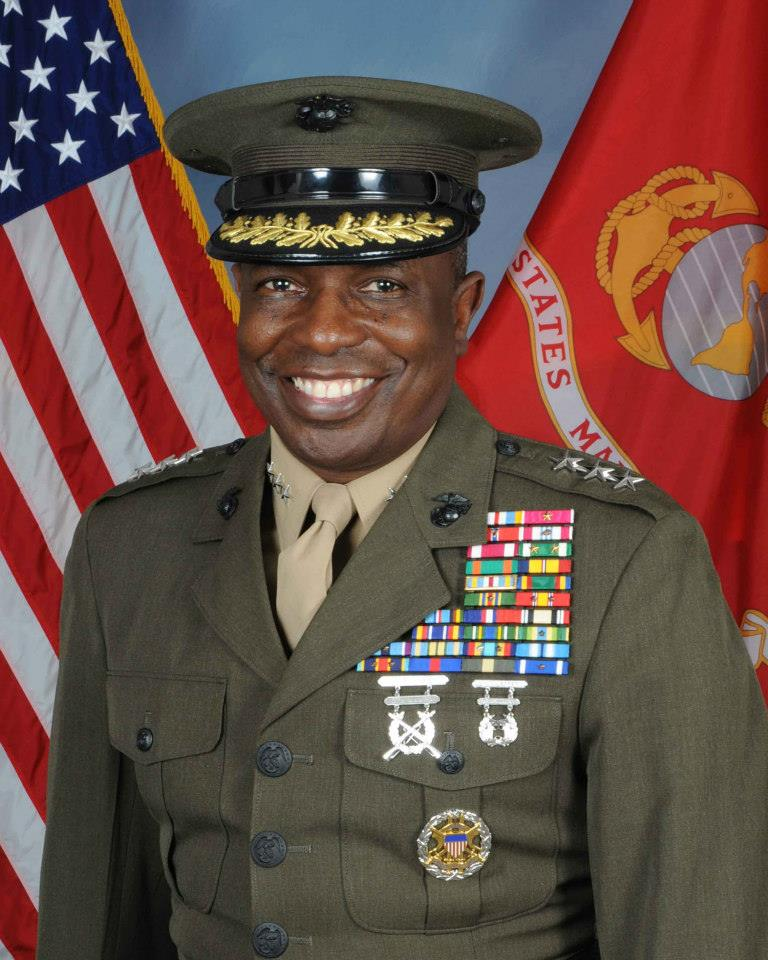
Walter E. Gaskin

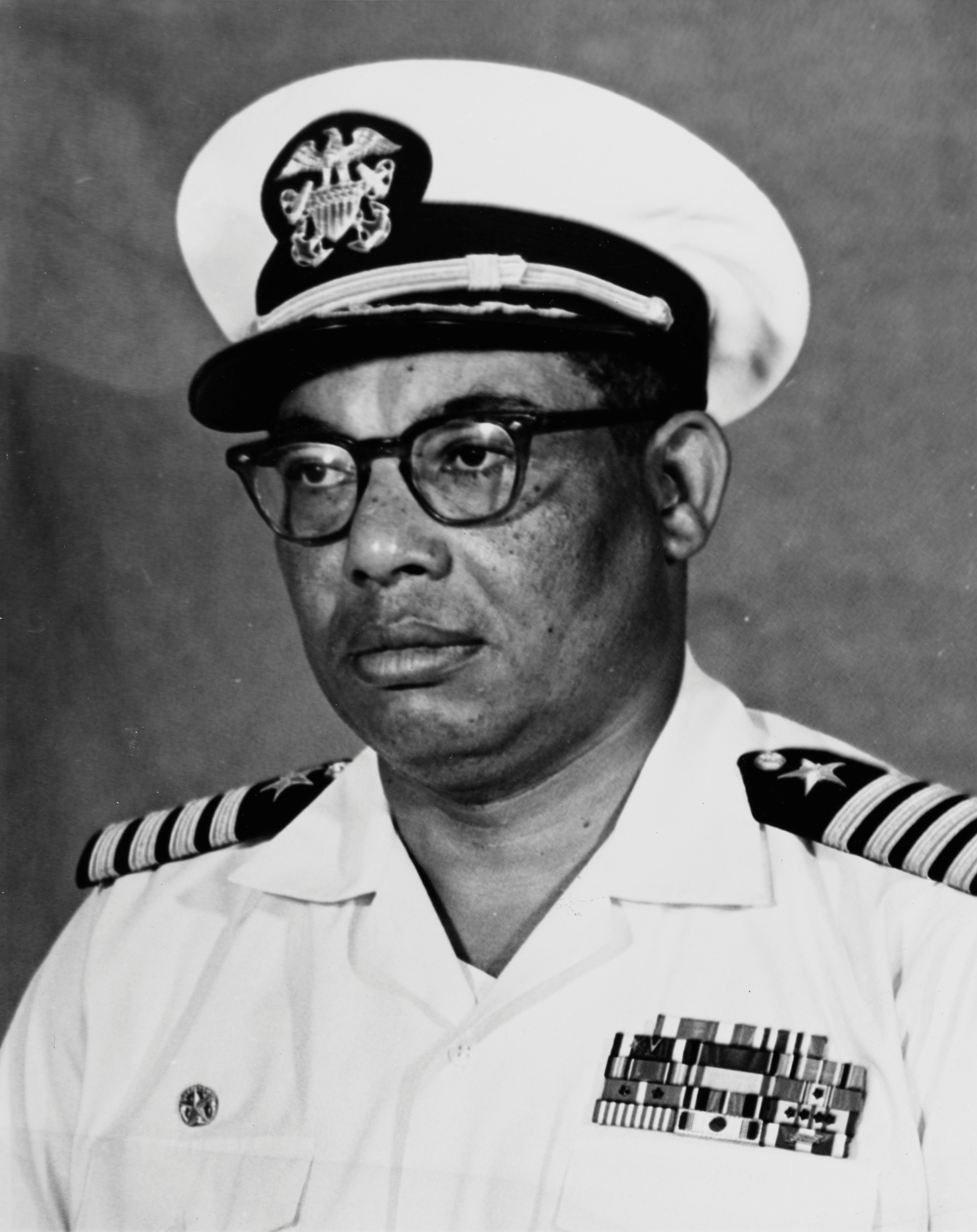
Samuel L. Gravely Jr.

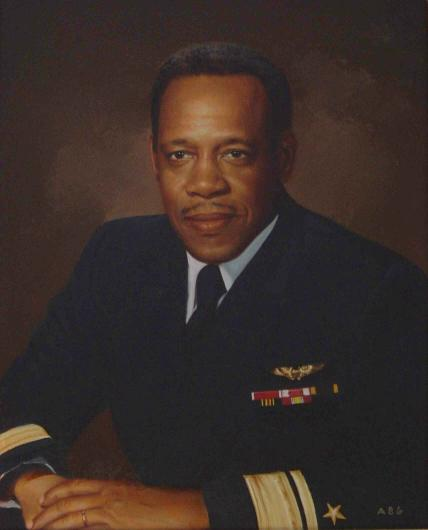
Benjamin Hacker

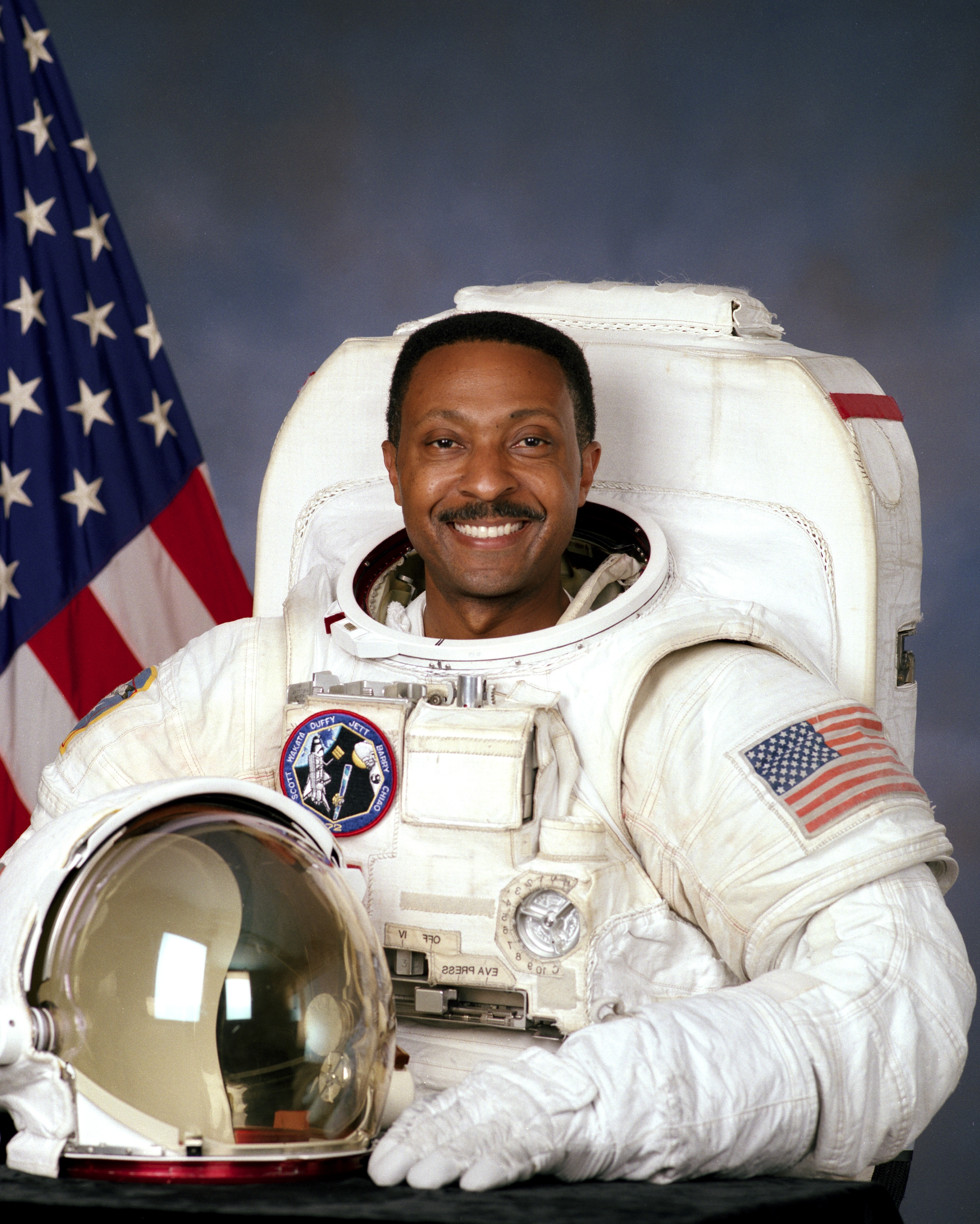
Winston E. Scott

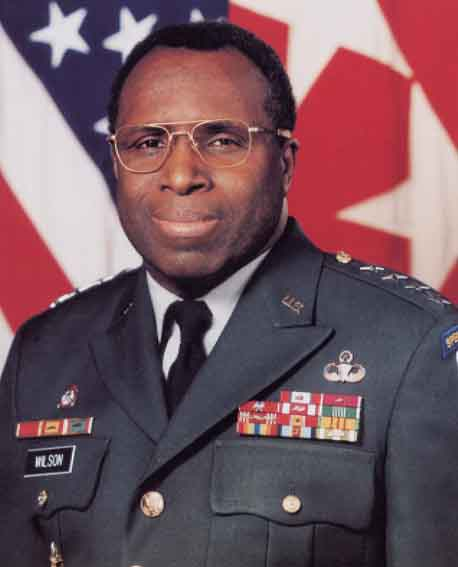
Johnnie Wilson

== Politics ==
=== U.S. Vice Presidents ===
Name	Original chapter	Notability	Ref.
Hubert Humphrey	Honorary	38th vice president of the United States; 1968 presidential candidate; senator from Minnesota; mayor of Minneapolis; 1979 Congressional Gold Medal and 1980 Presidential Medal of Freedom recipient	

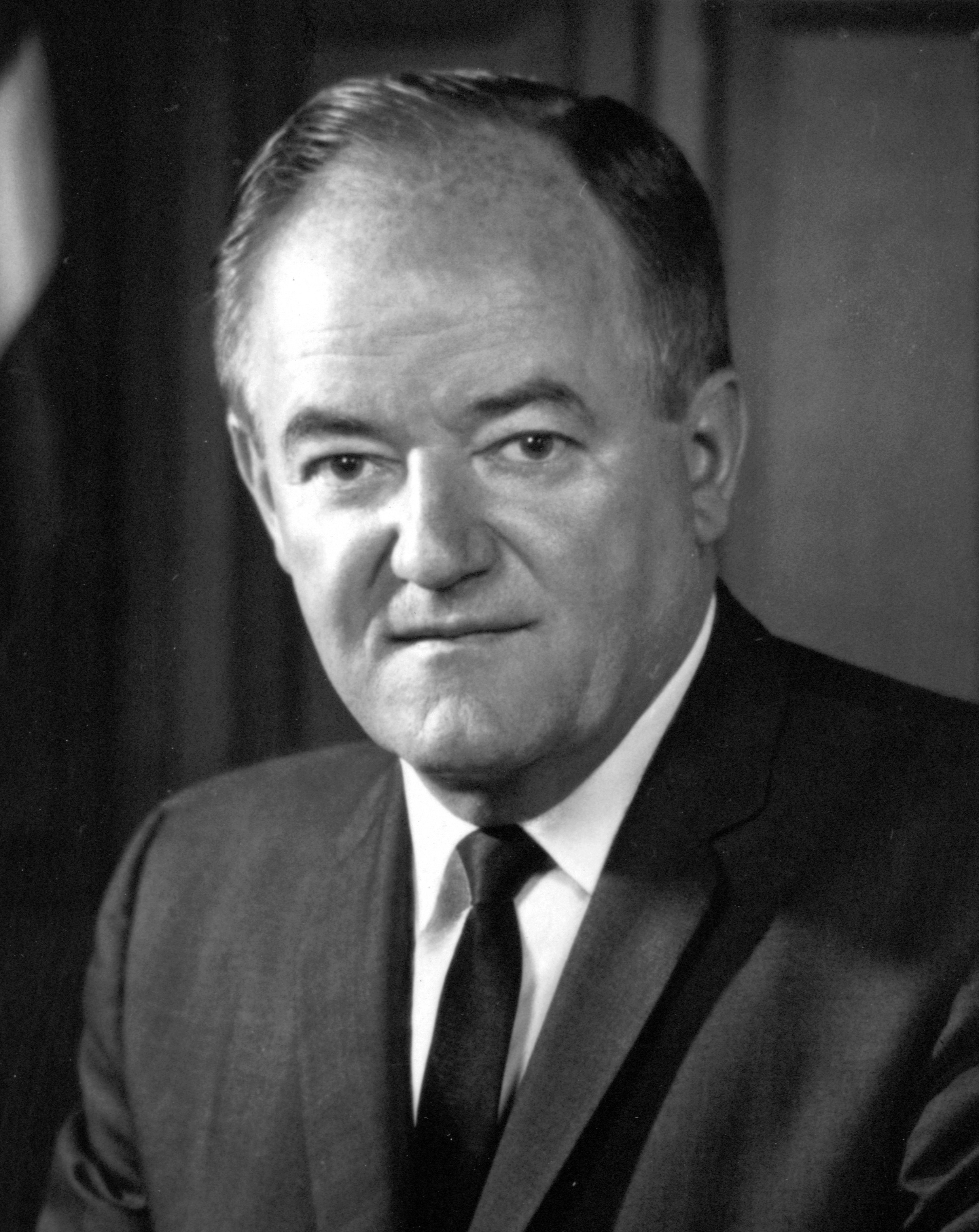
Hubert Humphrey

=== U.S. Cabinet ===
Name	Original chapter	Notability	Ref.
Lee P. Brown	Epsilon Beta	Director of National Drug Control Policy; first African-American mayor of Houston, Texas	
William Thaddeus Coleman Jr.	Psi	Secretary of Transportation; first Black Supreme Court law clerk; co-author of the brief in the landmark case Brown v. Board of Education of Topeka; co-counsel on the landmark case McLaughlin v. Florida, which established the constitutionality of interracial marriages; editor of the Harvard Law Review; 1995 Presidential Medal of Freedom recipient	
Don Cravins Jr.	Nu Psi	Under Secretary of Commerce for Minority Business Development; executive vice president and COO of the National Urban League; Louisiana State Legislature	
Malcolm Jackson	Delta Phi	Chief Information Officer and Assistant Administrator: Office of Environmental Information	
Rayford Logan	Omicron	First executive director of the National Urban League; member of President Franklin D Roosevelt's Black Cabinet; second executive director of the Association for the Study of African American Life and History (ASALH); 1980 Spingarn Medal recipient; 15th general president of Alpha Phi Alpha	
Samuel Pierce	Alpha	Secretary of Housing and Urban Development; argued before the United States Supreme Court on behalf of Martin Luther King Jr. and The New York Times in the important First Amendment case styled New York Times v. Sullivan; first African-American to serve on the Board of Directors of a Fortune 500 company	
Ron Sims	Zeta Pi Lambda	Deputy Secretary of the United States Department of Housing and Urban Development; served as King County Executive, King County, Washington	
Louis Wade Sullivan	Alpha Rho	Secretary of Health and Human Services; co-founder and first president of Morehouse School of Medicine	

Samuel Pierce

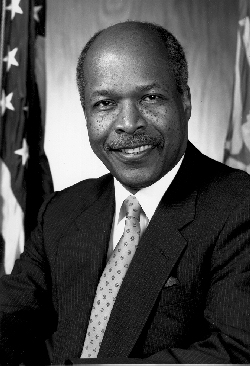
Louis Sullivan

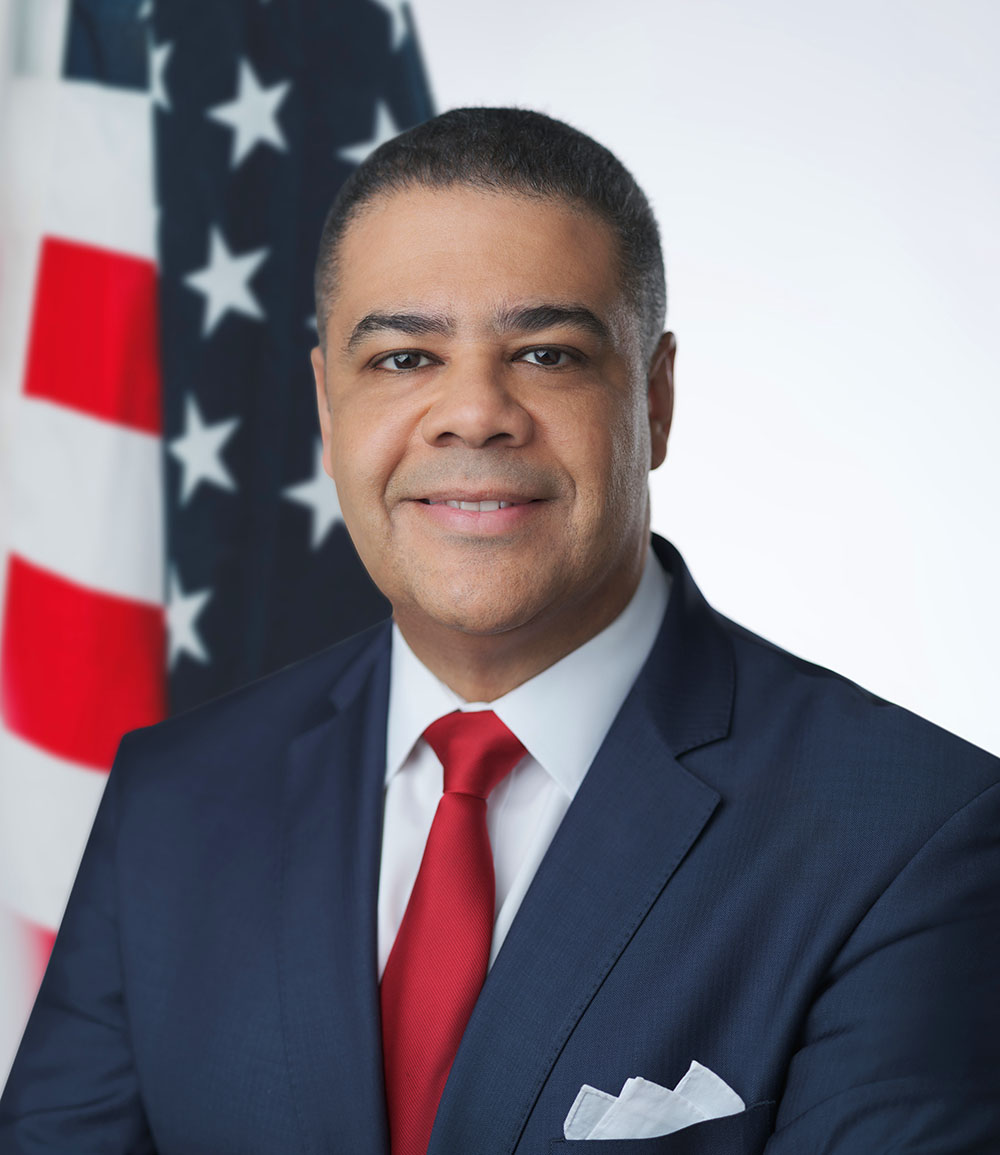
Don R. Cravins Jr.

=== U.S. Senate and House of Representatives ===
Name	Original chapter	Notability	Ref.
Edward Brooke	Beta	U.S. Senator from Massachusetts; Attorney General of Massachusetts	
Roland Burris	Beta Eta	U.S. Senator from Illinois; first Black Illinois Attorney General	
Hansen Clarke	Gamma Lambda	U.S. House of Representatives from Michigan	
Emanuel Cleaver	Eta Gamma	U.S. House of Representatives from Missouri; Mayor of Kansas City, Missouri	
Danny K. Davis	Gamma Delta	U.S. House of Representatives from Illinois	
William Dawson	Theta	U.S. House of Representatives from Illinois	
Ron Dellums	Delta Omicron	U.S. House of Representatives from California; co-founder of the Congressional Black Caucus; mayor of Oakland	
Julian C. Dixon	Alpha Delta	U.S. House of Representatives from California	
Chaka Fattah	Zeta Omicron Lambda	U.S. House of Representatives from Pennsylvania	
Floyd H. Flake	Zeta Gamma Lambda	U.S. House of Representatives from Illinois; president of Wilberforce University	
Harold Ford Sr.	Beta Omicron	U.S. House of Representatives from Tennessee; legislator of Tennessee	
William H. Gray	Rho	U.S. House of Representatives from Pennsylvania; CEO of the United Negro College Fund	
Al Green	Beta Nu	U.S. House of Representatives from Texas	
Earl F. Hilliard	Alpha Rho	U.S. House of Representatives from Alabama	
Steven Horsford	Eta Lambda	U.S. House of Representatives from Nevada	
John James	Kappa Delta Lambda	U.S. House of Representatives from Michigan	
Gregory W. Meeks	Zeta Zeta Lambda	U.S. House of Representatives from New York; New York State Assembly	
Ralph Metcalfe	Alpha Xi	U.S. House of Representatives from Illinois; co-founder of the Congressional Black Caucus; 1932 and 1936 Olympian	
Adam Clayton Powell Jr.	Eta	U.S. House of Representatives; early civil rights and racial equality legislation advocate; pastor of Abyssinian Baptist Church	
Charles B. Rangel	Alpha Gamma Lambda	U.S. House of Representatives from New York; co-founder of the Congressional Black Caucus; New York State Assembly Representative	
David Scott	Beta Nu	U.S. House of Representatives from Georgia	
Robert C. Scott	Sigma	U.S. House of Representatives from Virginia	
Bennett M. Stewart	Xi Lambda	U.S. House of Representatives from Illinois	
Raphael Warnock	Alpha Gamma Lambda	Senator from Georgia	

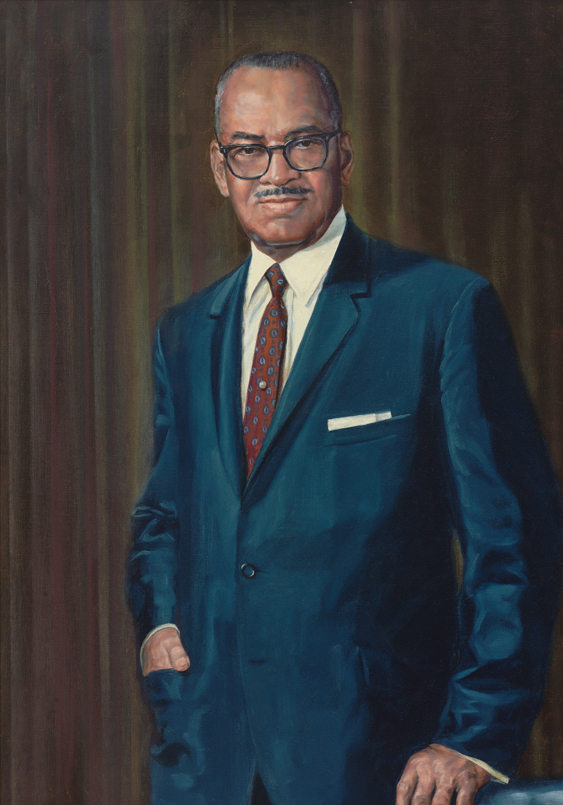
William Dawson

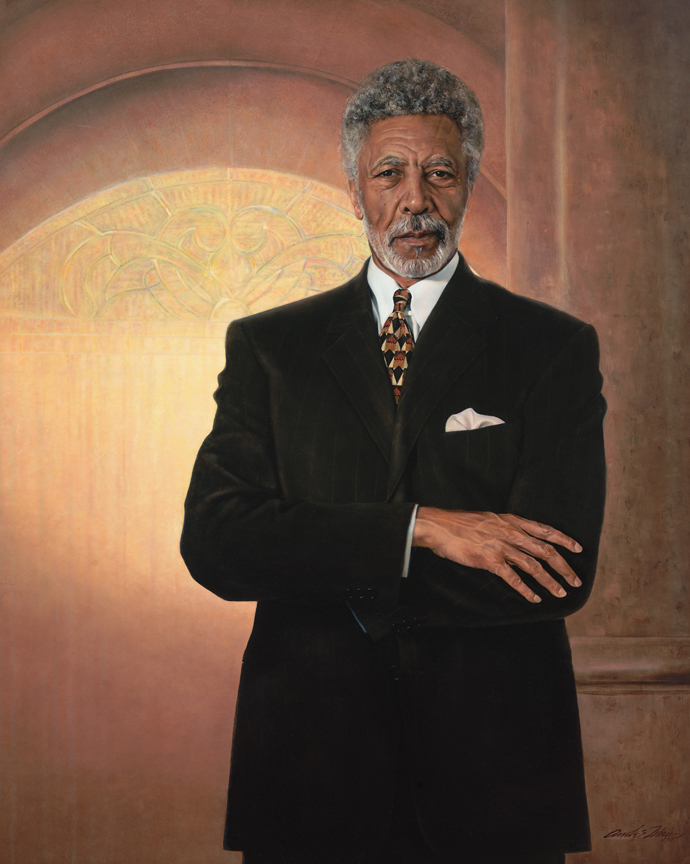
Ron Dellums

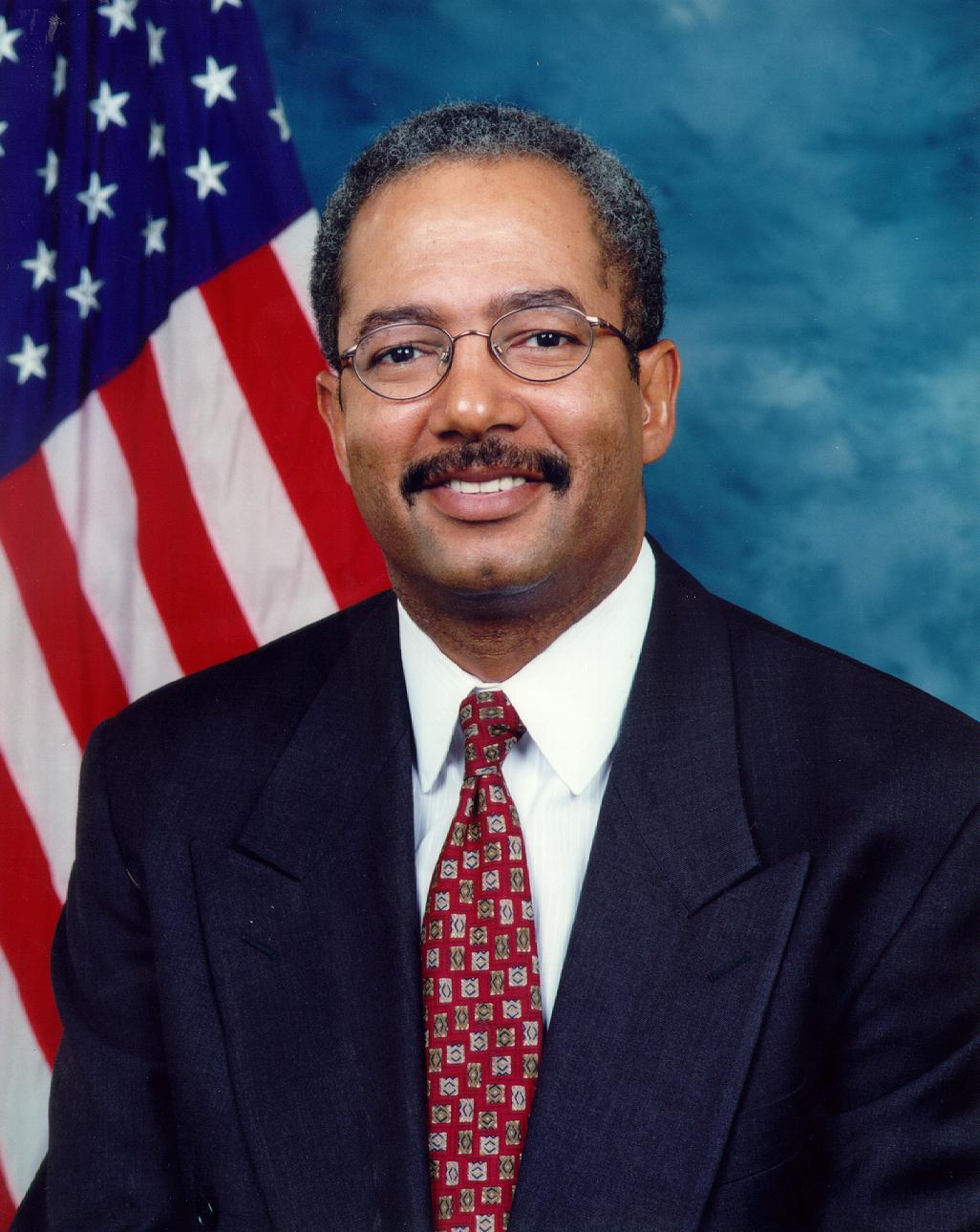
Chaka Fattah

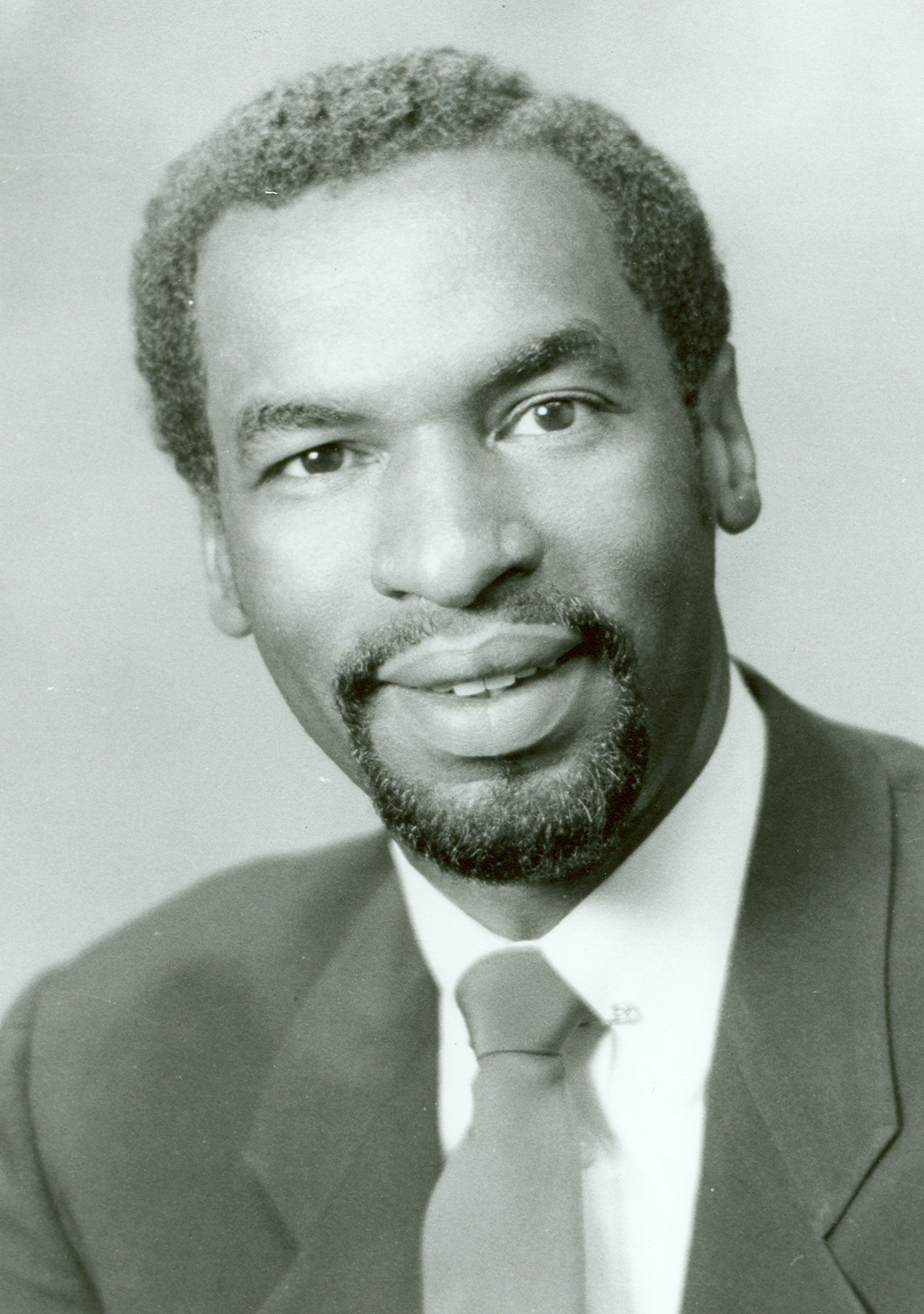
Floyd Flake

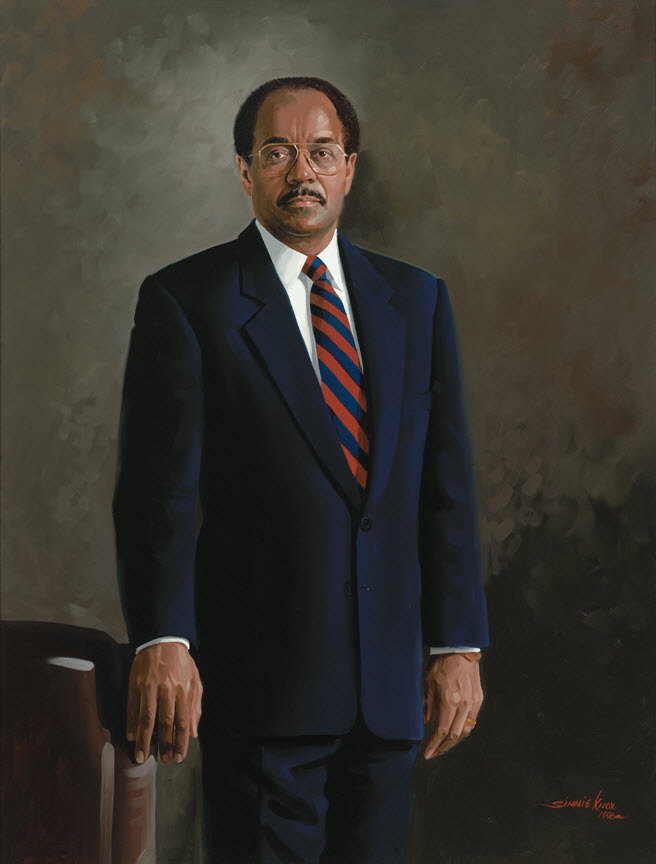
William H. Gray

=== Governors and lieutenant governors ===
Name	Original chapter	Notability	Ref.
Justin Fairfax	Kappa Omicron	Lieutenant governor of the Commonwealth of Virginia	
Walter A. Gordon	Alpha Epsilon	17th Governor of the United States Virgin Islands; Federal District Judge of the United States Virgin Islands	
Westley Moore	Sigma Sigma	2001 Rhodes Scholar; 63rd governor of Maryland	
Joe Rogers	Omicron Tau	Lieutenant governor of Colorado	
Roy L. Schneider	Beta	25th governor of the United States Virgin Islands	
Charles Wesley Turnbull	Gamma Iota	26th governor of the United States Virgin Islands	
James R. Williams	Alpha Tau	Lieutenant governor of Ohio candidate; 25th general president of Alpha Phi Alpha	

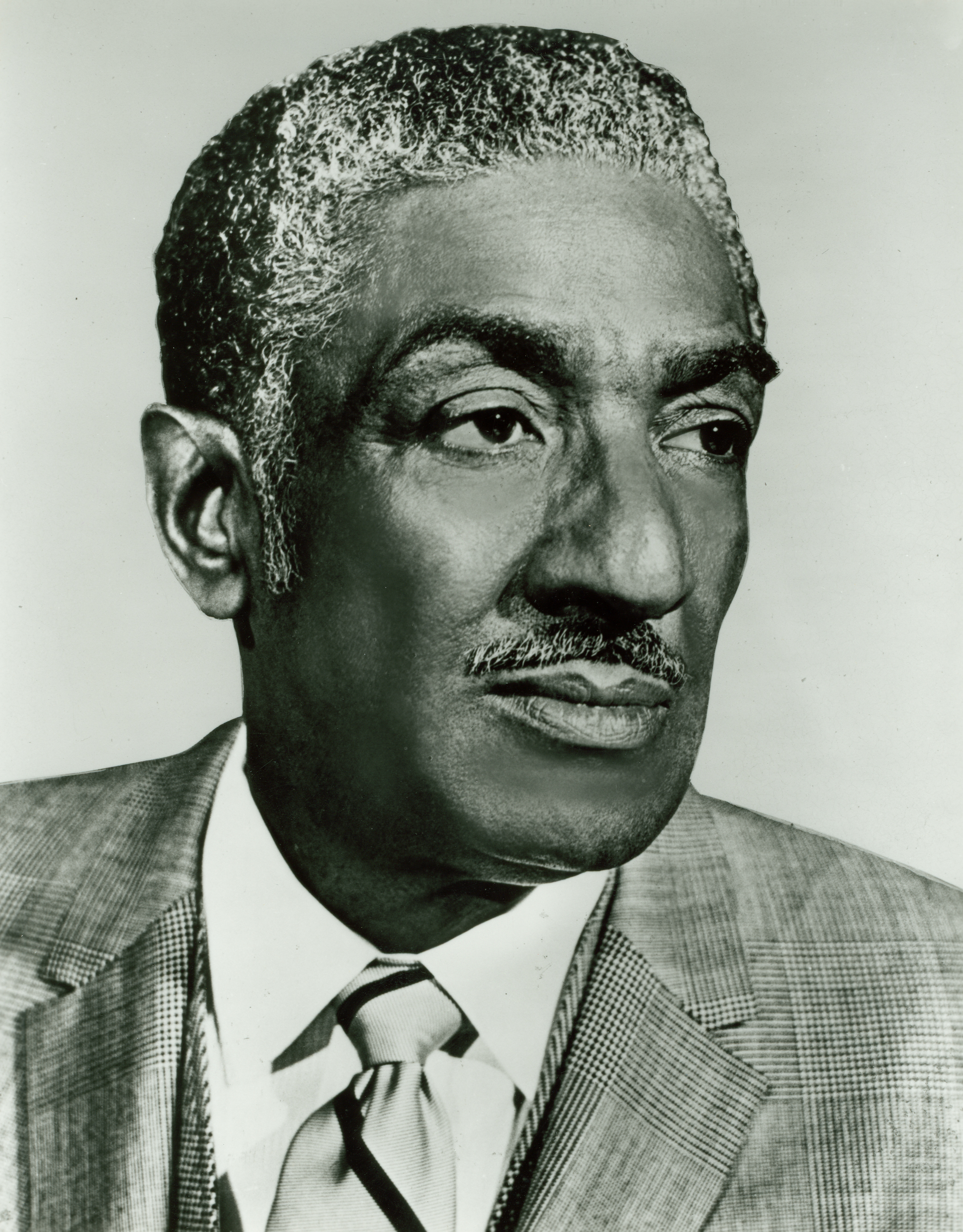
Ralph Metcalfe

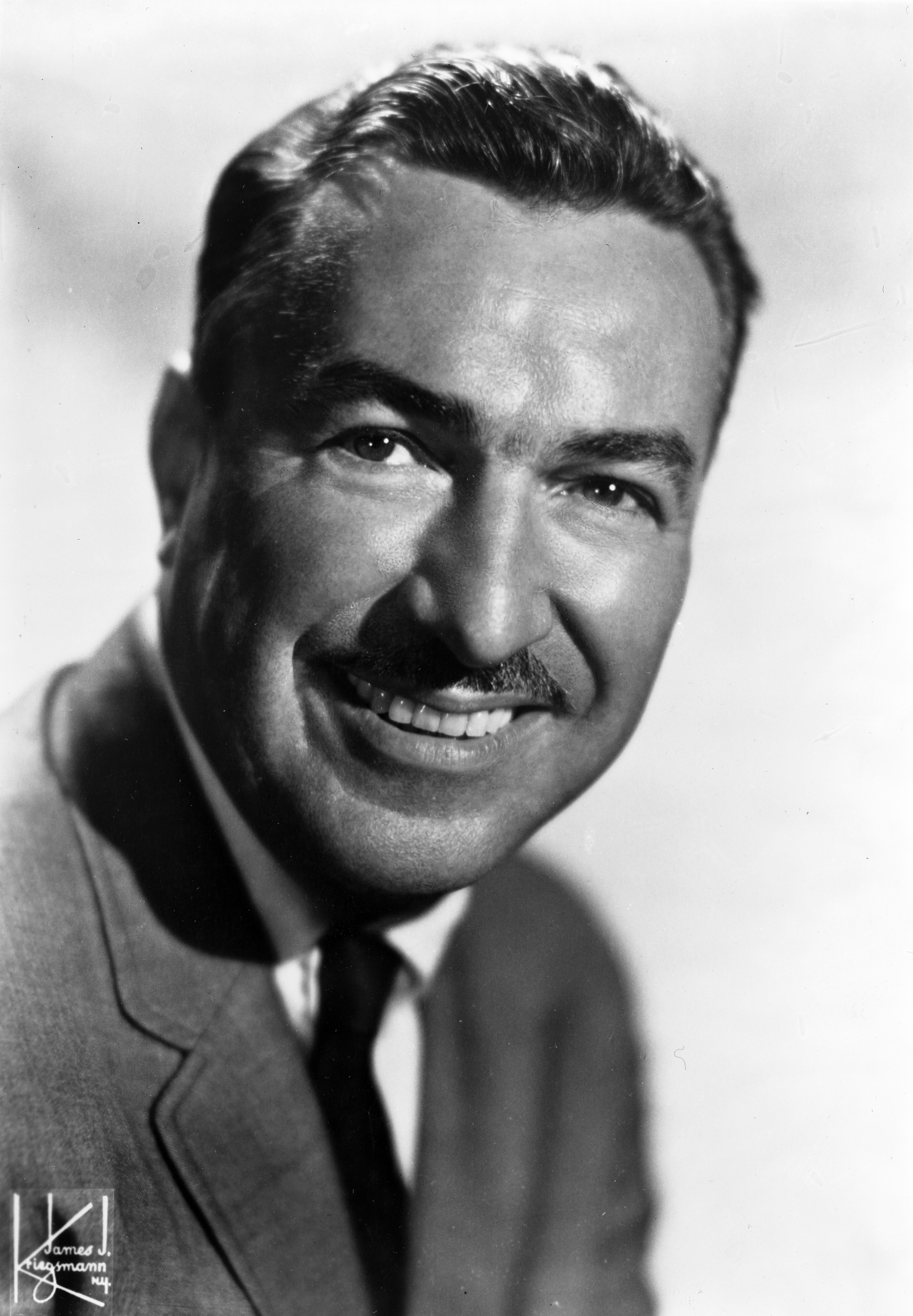
Adam Powell Jr.

=== Diplomats ===
Name	Original chapter	Notability	Ref.
Samuel Clifford Adams Jr.	Alpha Chi	U.S. Ambassador to the Republic of Niger	
Orison Rudolph Aggrey	Beta Mu Lambda	Ambassador to Republic of The Gambia, Republic of Senegal, and Romania	
Archibald Carey Jr.	Theta	Diplomat; attorney; Circuit Court Judge; pastor	
Walter Carrington	Sigma	Ambassador to Republic of Senegal and Federal Republic of Nigeria	
Horace Dawson	Nu	Ambassador to Republic of Botswana; director of the Ralph Bunche International Affairs Center, Howard University; chairman of the World Policy Council	
Frederick Douglass	Omega (honorary)	United States Ambassador to Haiti; anti-slavery activist	
Edward R. Dudley	Alpha Omicron	United States Ambassador to Liberia; first African American to hold the rank ambassador; Justice of the New York Supreme Court	
Walter A. Gordon	Alpha Epsilon	U.S. Federal District Court judge; governor of the U.S. Virgin Islands; first All-American football player in University of California history and California state champion in wrestling and boxing; chartering member of Alpha Epsilon chapter of Alpha Phi Alpha Fraternity, Inc.	
Lionel Hampton	Phi	Goodwill Ambassador; jazz percussionist and bandleader; National Medal of Arts recipient	
James A. Joseph	Beta Sigma	Ambassador to South Africa; Under Secretary of Interior	
Kenton Keith	Upsilon	Ambassador to State of Qatar	
Raphael Lanier	Mu Lambda	Minister to Liberia; first president of Texas Southern University	
Delano Lewis	Upsilon	Ambassador to South Africa; president and chief executive officer of National Public Radio; president of The Chesapeake and Potomac Telephone Company	
Donald McHenry	Eta Tau	Ambassador to United Nations	
John H. Morrow	Delta Iota	First United States Ambassador to Guinea after its independence; first US representative to the United Nations Educational, Scientific and Cultural Organization (UNESCO)	
Gerald Eustis Thomas	Sigma	Ambassador to Guyana and Kenya; Admiral, US Navy	
Terence Todman	Delta Zeta	Ambassador to Republic of Chad, Guinea, Costa Rica, Spain, Denmark, and Argentina	
Lester Walton	Eta	Minister to Liberia	
Clifton Reginald Wharton Sr.	Sigma	Ambassador to Norway and Minister to Romania	
Franklin H. Williams	Nu	Ambassador to Republic of Ghana and the United Nations; president of the Phelps-Stokes Fund	
Andrew Young	Beta	Ambassador to the United Nations; U.S. House of Representatives; mayor of Atlanta; governor of Georgia candidate; 1978 Spingarn Medal, 1981 Presidential Medal of Freedom, and French Légion d'honneur recipient	

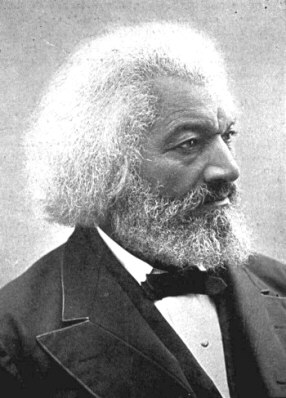
Frederick Douglass

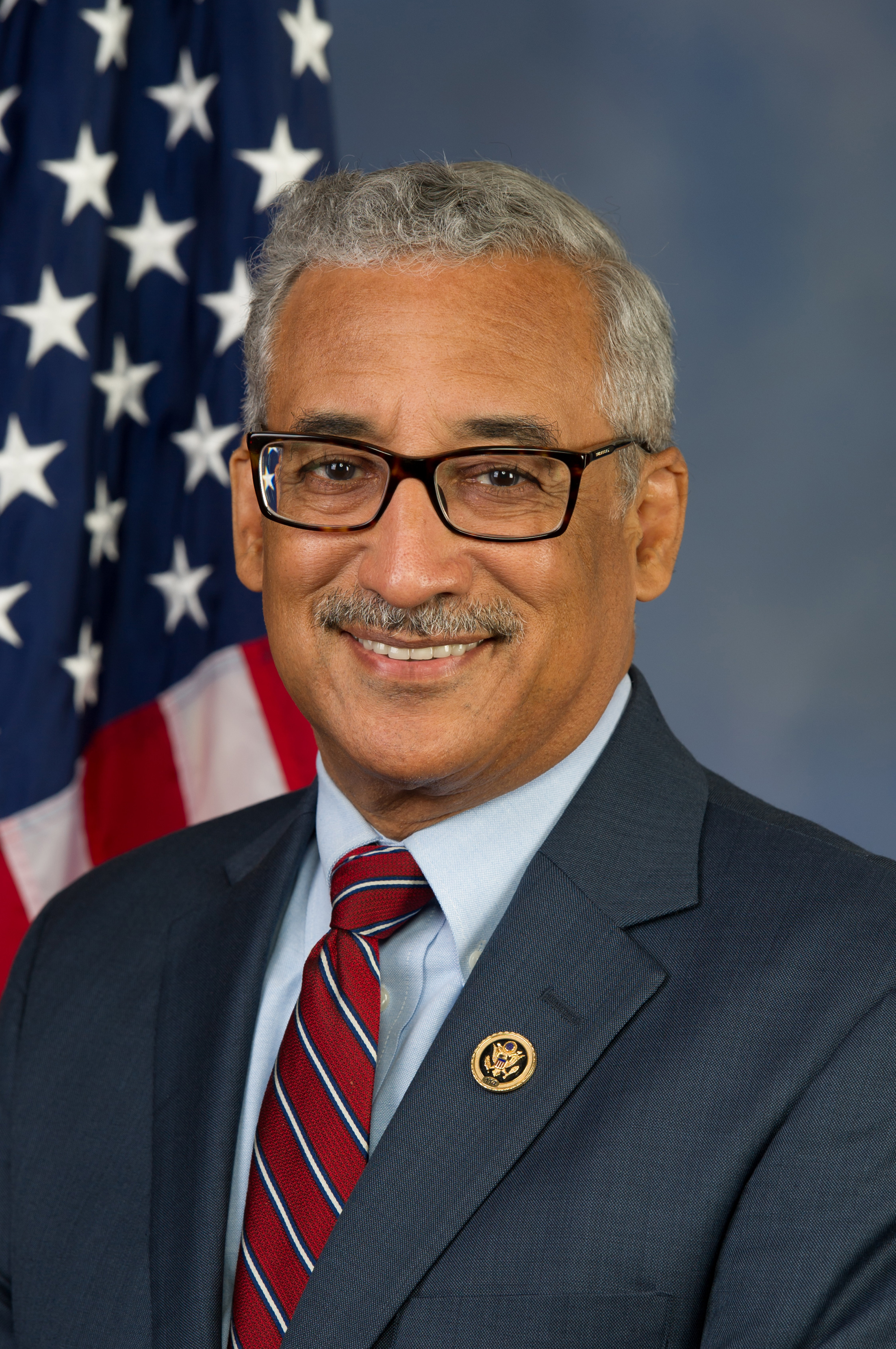
Robert Scott

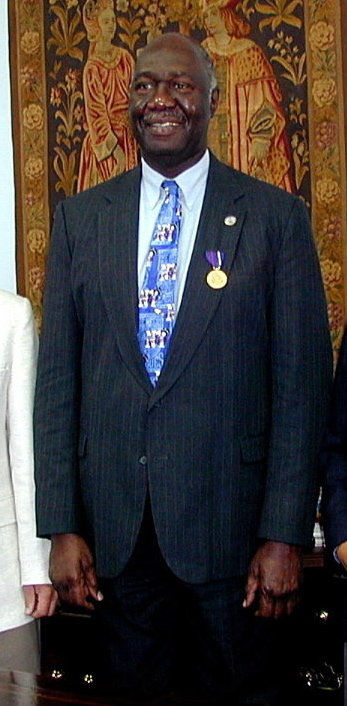
Charles Turnbull

=== State legislatures ===
Name	Original chapter	Notability	Ref.
Daniel T. Blue Jr.	Gamma Beta	North Carolina House of Representatives; Speaker of the North Carolina House of Representatives; 2002 Democratic candidate for the United States Senate	
Roy A. Burrell	Eta Chi	Louisiana House of Representatives; former member of the Shreveport City Council; former president of the Delta Upsilon Lambda chapter	
Randy D. Dunn	Omicron Xi Lambda	Missouri House of Representatives	
Al Edwards		Texas House of Representatives; considered the father of the Juneteenth Holiday	
Kambrell Garvin	Xi Phi	South Carolina House of Representatives	
Patrick O. Jefferson	Beta Phi	Member of the Louisiana House of Representatives for District 11; lawyer in Arcadia, Louisiana	
Carl McCall	Theta Zeta	Legislator of New York; Comptroller of New York; 2002 Democratic candidate for governor of New York	
Billy Mitchell	Theta Epilson Lambda	Georgia House of Representatives	
William Byron Rumford	Gamma Phi Lambda	Member of the California State Legislature	
C. O. Simpkins Sr.	Dillard University	Member of the Louisiana House of Representatives for Caddo Parish, 1992 to 1996	
Charles E. Sydnor III	Delta Lambda	Member of the Maryland Senate since 2019. Previously served in the Maryland House of Delegates from 2015 to 2020.	
Albert Vann	Alpha Xi Lambda	New York State Assembly	
Alonzo T. Washington	Pi Upsilon Lambda	Member of the Maryland Senate since 2023. Previously served in the Maryland House of Delegates from 2012 to 2023.	
Herb Wesson	Nu	California State Assembly; Speaker of the California State Assembly	
Tyrone Yates	Alpha Alpha	Ohio House of Representatives	

=== Local government ===
Name	Original chapter	Notability	Ref.
Dennis Archer	Alpha Upsilon	Justice of the Michigan Supreme Court; mayor of Detroit, Michigan; first Black president of the American Bar Association	
Richard Arrington Jr.	Gamma Kappa	First Black mayor of Birmingham	
Calvin Ball III	Kappa Phi Lambda	Howard County Executive	
Ras J. Baraka	Alpha Alpha Lambda	Mayor of Newark, New Jersey; Grammy Award-winning music producer; educator; author	
Thomas V. Barnes	Gamma Rho	Mayor of Gary, Indiana	
Marion Barry	Beta Xi	Mayor of Washington, D.C.; first chairman of the Student Nonviolent Coordinating Committee (SNCC)	
Ted Berry	Alpha Alpha	First Black mayor of Cincinnati; board member of the NAACP	
Byron Brown	Delta Epsilon	Senator of New York; first Black mayor of Buffalo	
Willie Brown	Xi Rho	First Black mayor of San Francisco; Speaker of the California State Assembly; the San Francisco-Oakland Bay Bridge is in part named in his honor	
John T. Bullock	Gamma Iota	Member of the Baltimore City Council since 2016	
Melvin Carter	Beta Nu	First Black mayor of St. Paul, Minnesota	
Mark Conway	Iota Zeta	Member of the Baltimore City Council since 2020.	
Lawrence D. Crawford	Epsilon	Mayor of Saginaw, Michigan	
David Dinkins	Beta	First Black mayor of New York City	
Gow Fields	Mu Zeta Lambda	First Black mayor of Lakeland, Florida	
Anthony Ford	Xi Iota	Mayor of Stockridge, Georgia	
Maynard Jackson	Alpha Rho	First Black and three-term mayor of Atlanta; Atlanta's Hartsfield-Jackson Airport is in part named in his honor	
Harvey Johnson Jr.	Beta Omicron	First Black mayor of Jackson, Mississippi	
Jermaine A. Jones	Delta Zeta	Member of the Baltimore City Council since 2024.	
Kwame Kilpatrick	Beta Nu	Mayor of Detroit who resigned after pleading guilty to felony charges stemming from a text message scandal; convicted of federal charges including racketeering and extortion. Renounced his membership in the fraternity in March or 2026.	
Henry L. Marsh III	Gamma	First African American mayor of Richmond	
Rudolph McCollum Jr.	Beta	Mayor of Richmond	
James McGee	Xi	First Black mayor of Dayton	
Wayne M. Messam	Iota Delta	First Black mayor of Miramar, Florida	
Ernest Nathan Morial	Beta Tau	Louisiana State Legislature; first Black mayor of New Orleans; namesake of the Ernest N. Morial Convention Center in New Orleans	
Marc Morial	Psi	Louisiana State Legislature; mayor of New Orleans; 8th CEO of the National Urban League	
J.O. Patterson	Alpha Chi	First African American mayor of Memphis, Tennessee	
Norm Rice	Zeta Pi Lambda	First and only African-American mayor of Seattle	
Eugene Sawyer	Beta Upsilon	Mayor of Chicago	
Frank Scott Jr.	Kappa Eta	Mayor of Little Rock, Arkansas	
AC Wharton	Beta Omicron	Mayor of Memphis, Tennessee	
Lionel Wilson	Alpha Epsilon	First Black mayor of Oakland	
Randall Woodfin	Alpha Rho	Mayor of Birmingham, Alabama	

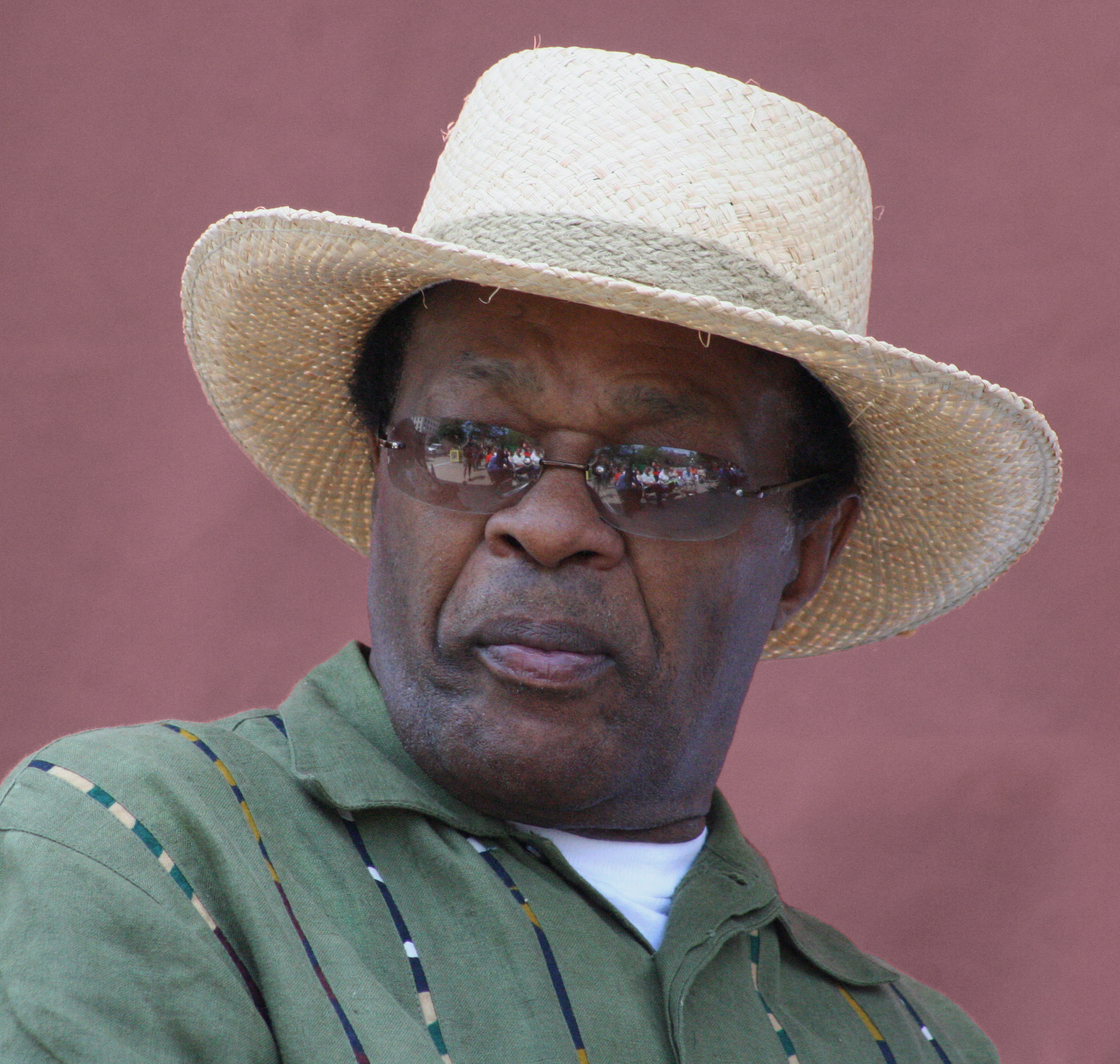
Marion Barry

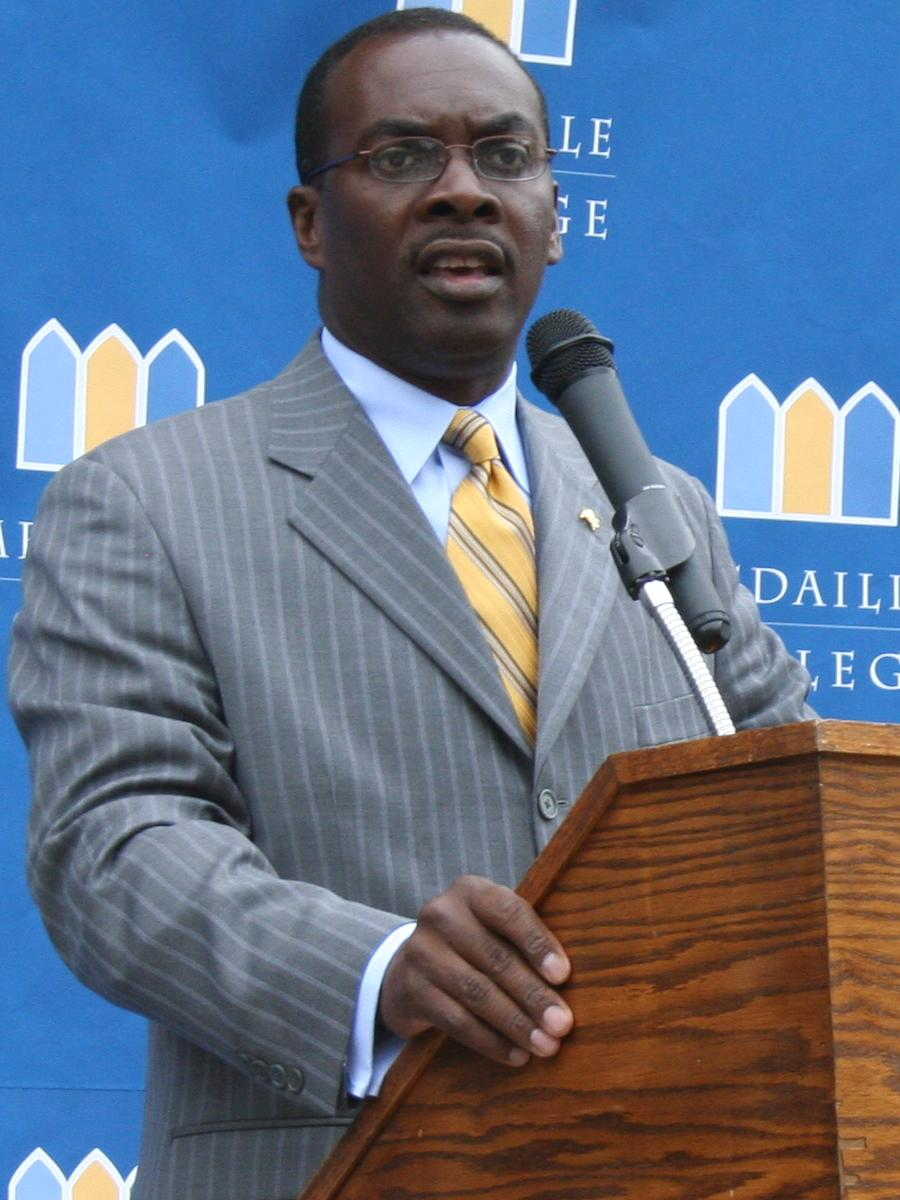
Byron Brown

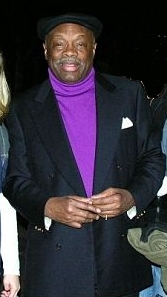
Willie Brown

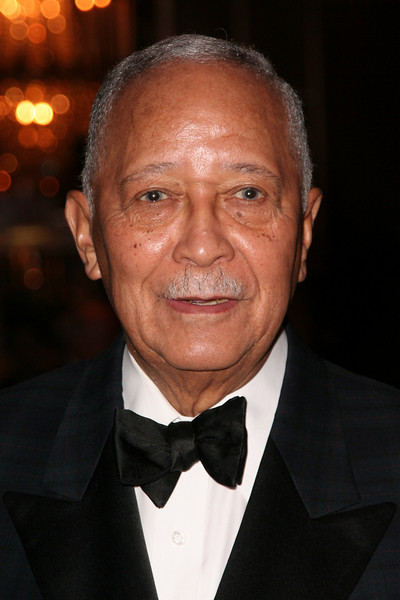
David Dinkins

=== Government officials outside the U.S. ===
Name	Original chapter	Notability	Ref.
Joseph Boakai	Eta Epsilon Lambda	President of Liberia, previously vice president serving under President Ellen Johnson Sirleaf	
David Burt	Nu Beta	Premier of Bermuda; Member of Parliament; Deputy Leader of the Progressive Labour Party; former Senator, Bermuda	
Shawn Crockwell	Rho Chi	Member of Parliament and Minister of Tourism, Development & Transport, Bermuda	
Clifton Stanley Hardy	Tau	Chief auditor for the Republic of Liberia, European correspondent for the Associated Negro Press in Paris, government adviser on export-import banking issues for Liberia	
Stuart Hayward	Beta	House of Assembly of Bermuda	
Norman Washington Manley	Beta Beta Lambda	Premier of Jamaica; founder of Jamaica's People's National Party; 1914 Rhodes Scholar	
Prince K. Moye	Eta Epsilon Lambda	Deputy Speaker of the House of Representatives of Liberia	
Diallo Vincent Rabain	Epsilon Theta Lambda	Minister for the Cabinet Office and Digital Innovation; Minister of Education and Workforce Development; and a member of Parliament; former Opposition Senate Leader and Senator, Bermuda	
Edward Richards	Epsilon Theta Lambda	First Premier of Bermuda	
Lawrence Scott	Epsilon Theta Lambda	Member of Parliament, Bermuda; son of former Premier of Bermuda William Alexander Scott	
K. Peter Turnquest	Eta Gamma	Member of Parliament, Deputy Leader of the Free National Movement Party, the Bahamas	
Daniel Dee Ziankahn	Eta Epsilon Lambda	Minister of National Defense of Liberia; Major general, Chief of Staff, Armed Forces of Liberia	

== Religion ==
Name	Original chapter	Notability	Ref.
John Hurst Adams	Alpha Omicron	Founder of the Congress of National Black churches; senior bishop of the A.M.E. church; civil rights activist; president of Paul Quinn College	
Vinton R. Anderson	Xi	92nd bishop of African Methodist Episcopal Church; president of World Council of Churches	
Robert P. Boxie	Kappa Theta	Auxiliary Bishop of the Archdiocese of Washington; Youngest Catholic Bishop in the United States	
James H. Cone	Beta Chi	Author of Black Theology & Black Power; considered the "father of Black Liberation Theology"; Distinguished Professor of Theology at Union Theological Seminary	
Cain Hope Felder	Beta	First national director of the United Methodist Black Caucus; Professor of Theology at Howard University and Princeton University; editor of The African American Jubilee Bible	
Robert E. Hayes Jr.	Huston–Tillotson University	Bishop in the United Methodist Church	
T. J. Jemison	Beta Upsilon	Co-founder of the Southern Christian Leadership Conference (SCLC); president of National Baptist Convention; organized the Baton Rouge Bus Boycott of 1953	
Otis Moss Jr.	Alpha Rho	Pastor, theologian, author, lecturer, civil rights activist, aide to Martin Luther King jr.; author of Preach!: The Power and Purpose Behind our Praise	
Clementa C. Pinckney	Gamma Gamma	Senior pastor of Emanuel African Methodist Episcopal Church; one of nine people slain in the 2015 Charleston church shooting; his eulogy was delivered by President Barack Obama; South Carolina State Senator	
J. Alfred Smith		President of Progressive National Baptist Convention	

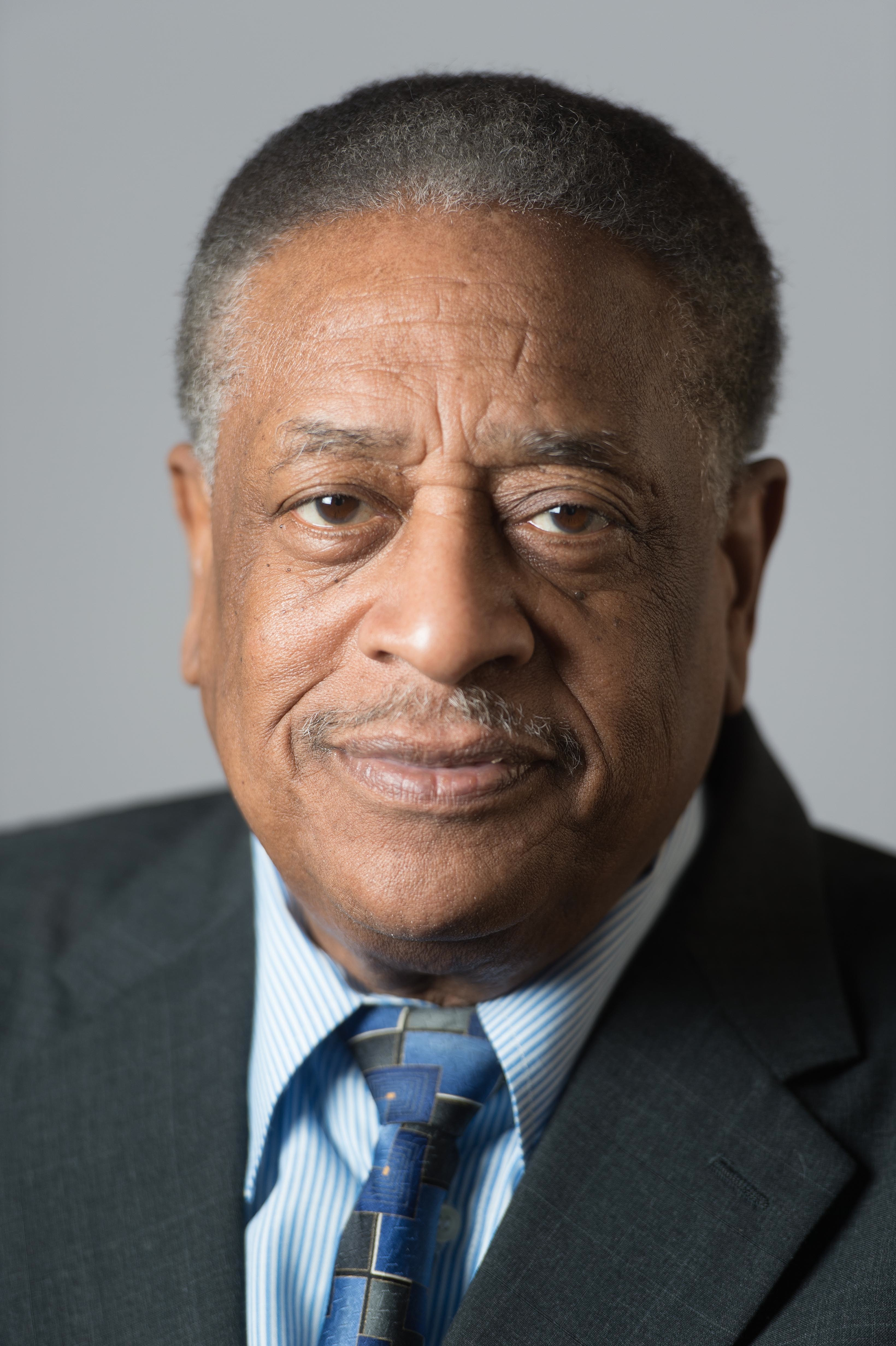
Cain Hope Felder

== Science and medicine ==
Name	Original chapter	Notability	Ref.
Leonidas Berry	Xi	Pioneer in the medical sciences of gastroscopy and endoscopy; inventor of the Berry endoscope; President of the National Medical Association 1965-1966; author of I wouldn't take Nothin' for My Journey: Two Centuries of an Afro-American Minister's Family	
Herman Branson	Beta Gamma	President of Central State University and Lincoln University; co-discoverer of the Alpha helix; sickle-cell physicist	
William Warrick Cardozo	Kappa	Physician; pioneer researcher of sickle cell anemia; Howard University professor of Medicine; Chief of Staff, Gastroenterology at Providence Hospital	
George Sherman Carter	Nu	Nuclear physicist, worked on the Manhattan Project	
James P. Comer	Gamma Eta	Prominent child psychiatrist; founder of the Comer School Development Program at the Yale University Child Study Center; associate dean at the Yale University School of Medicine	
Eugene Dibble	Beta	American Physician; Head of the Hospital at the Tuskegee Institute. Important Role in the Tuskegee Syphilis Study.	
Lloyd Hall	Theta	Chemist who contributed to the science of food preservation; author of 59 United States patents; a number of his inventions were also patented in foreign countries	
Ernest J. Harris	Gamma Delta	Research entomologist with the United States Department of Agriculture; developer of the "male annihilation" method of insect control adopted by over 20 countries; original Montford Point Marine and 2017 recipient of the Congressional Gold Medal	
Marshall G. Jones	Beta Pi Lambda	Acclaimed research scientist in the field of laser additive technologies; Coolidge Fellow at General Electric	
LaSalle D. Leffall Jr.	Beta Nu	President of American College of Surgeons; president of American Cancer Society	
Julian Herman Lewis	Theta	First African American to hold both an MD and a Ph.D.; groundbreaking research scientist exploring differences in disease expressions by race; expert on blood typing and race-based medical diagnosis and treatment	
Garrett A. Morgan	Delta Alpha Lambda	Inventor who originated a respiratory protective hood (similar to modern gas masks) and a hair-straightening preparation; patented a type of traffic light signal	
Earl W. Renfroe	Theta	Orthodontist; for many years, he was acknowledged as one of the best hands-on clinical orthodontics instructors in the world; a dental facility in Barbados is named after him	
J. Marshall Shepherd	Iota Delta	Physicist; NASA meteorologist; professor at University of Georgia; expert on global climate change and environmental issues	
Levi Watkins	Beta Omicron	Chief of cardiovascular surgery at Johns Hopkins Hospital; performed the world's first human implantation of the automatic implantable defibrillator; first African-American medical student at Vanderbilt University	

Garrett Morgan

== Service and social reform ==
Name	Original chapter	Notability	Ref.
William J. Barber II	Gamma Beta	North Carolina NAACP state president, 2018 MacArthur Foundation Genius award recipient, architect of the Moral Mondays Movement, author of The Third Reconstruction: Moral Mondays	
Ezell Blair Jr.	Beta Epsilon	Civil rights activist and member of the Greensboro Four	
Cornell William Brooks	Delta Phi	18th president/CEO of the NAACP; attorney; social and civil rights activist	
W. E. B. Du Bois	Epsilon (honorary)	Co-founder of Niagara Movement and NAACP; founder and editor-in-chief of The Crisis; first African American to receive a PhD from Harvard University; 1920 Spingarn Medal recipient; author of The Souls of Black Folks	
Lloyd L. Gaines	Alpha Psi	Central figure of one of the most important cases in the Civil Rights Movement, the Supreme Court case Missouri ex rel. Gaines v. Canada	
Lester Granger	Theta Zeta	3rd Executive Secretary of the National Urban League	
Dick Gregory	Beta Eta	1968 presidential candidate; comedian, social activist, writer	
George Edmund Haynes	Beta	Founder and first president of the National Urban League; first African American to receive a PhD from Columbia University	
John Hope	Eta Lambda	First Black president of Atlanta University; president of Atlanta University; co-founder of the Niagara Movement and NAACP; fourth president of the Association for the Study of African American Life and History (ASALH); 1936 Spingarn Medal recipient	
T. J. Jemison	Beta Upsilon	Co-founder of the Southern Christian Leadership Conference; president of the National Baptist Convention; organized the Baton Rouge Bus Boycott of 1953	
Charles S. Johnson	Gamma	Editor of the National Urban League's Opportunity magazine; first Black president of Fisk University	
Lyman T. Johnson	Gamma	Plaintiff whose successful legal challenge opened the University of Kentucky to African-American students in 1949	
Martin Luther King Jr.	Sigma	1962 Nobel Peace Prize; civil rights activist; co-founder of the Southern Christian Leadership Conference (SCLC); Martin Luther King Jr. Day was established in his honor; 1957 Spingarn Medal, 1977 Presidential Medal of Freedom, and 2004 Congressional Gold Medal recipient; first African American with a memorial on the National Mall	
Martin Luther King III	Eta Lambda	President and CEO of the King Center for Nonviolent Social Change; former president of the Southern Christian Leadership Conference (SCLC)	
Rayford Logan	Omicron	First executive director of the National Urban League; member of President Franklin D Roosevelt's Black Cabinet; 2nd executive director of the Association for the Study of African American Life and History (ASALH); 1980 Spingarn Medal recipient; 15th general president of Alpha Phi Alpha	
Joseph Lowery	Eta Lambda	Co-founder of the Southern Christian Leadership Conference (SCLC); delivered the benediction at the inauguration of Barack Obama in 2009; 2009 Presidential Medal of Freedom recipient	
Floyd McKissick	Alpha Rho	2nd president of Congress of Racial Equality; founder of Soul City	
Henry McKee Minton	Rho	medical doctor and co-founder of Mercy Hospital of Philadelphia; Co-founder of Sigma Pi Phi fraternity	
Jesse E. Moorland	Beta	Co-founder of the Association for the Study of African American Life and History (ASALH); namesake of Howard University's Moorland-Spingarn Research Center	
Marc Morial	Psi	Louisiana State Legislature; mayor of New Orleans; 8th CEO of the National Urban League	
Hugh Bernard Price	Eta Alpha Lambda	7th president of the National Urban League	
Paul Robeson	Nu	NFL player, actor and singer; social activist, 1945 Spingarn Medal recipient; Stalin Peace Prize laureate	
Ozell Sutton	Pi Lambda	Co-founder of the National Center for Missing and Exploited Children; 2012 Congressional Gold Medal recipient; 26th general president of Alpha Phi Alpha fraternity; original Monford Point Marine	
Heman Sweatt	Alpha Sigma	Plaintiff in the US Supreme Court case styled Sweatt v. Painter, which successfully challenged the "separate but equal" doctrine of racial segregation established by the 1896 case Plessy v. Ferguson	
Channing Heggie Tobias	Beta	Chairman of the NAACP, director of the Phelps-Stokes Fund; 1948 Spingarn Medal recipient	
C. T. Vivian	Eta Lambda	Civil rights activist and aide to Dr. Martin Luther King Jr.; 2013 Presidential Medal of Freedom recipient; author and humanitarian	
Wyatt Tee Walker	Gamma	Co-founder and 3rd Executive Director of the Southern Christian Leadership Conference (SCLC); civil and human rights activist	
Alfred Bitini Xuma		President of the African National Congress	
Max Yergan	Theta	2nd president of the National Negro Congress; Co-founder of the International Council on African Affairs; 1933 Spingarn Medal recipient	
Whitney Young	Beta Mu	4th president of the National Urban League; 1968 Presidential Medal of Freedom recipient; namesake of the Whitney Young Memorial Bridge	

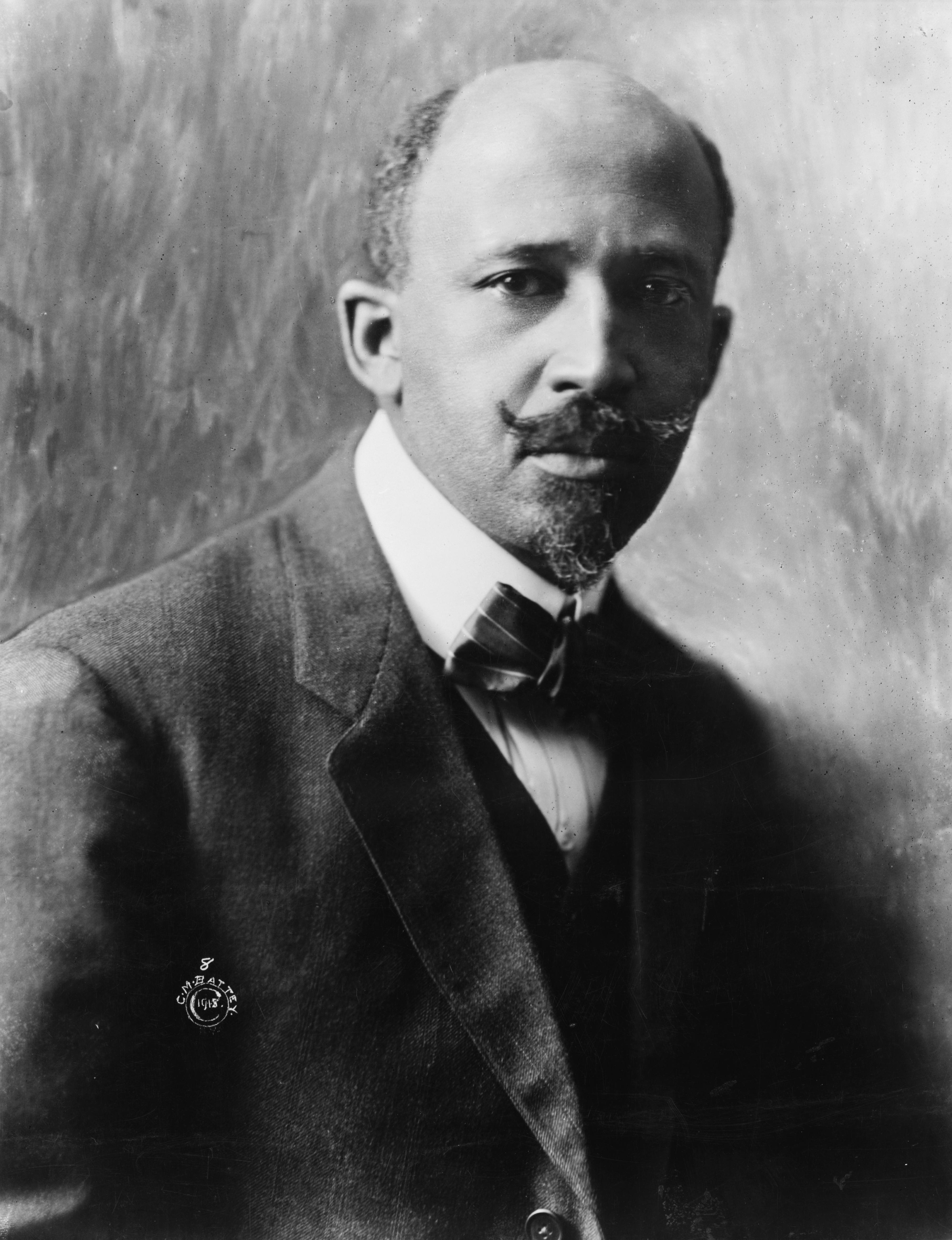
W. E. B. Du Bois

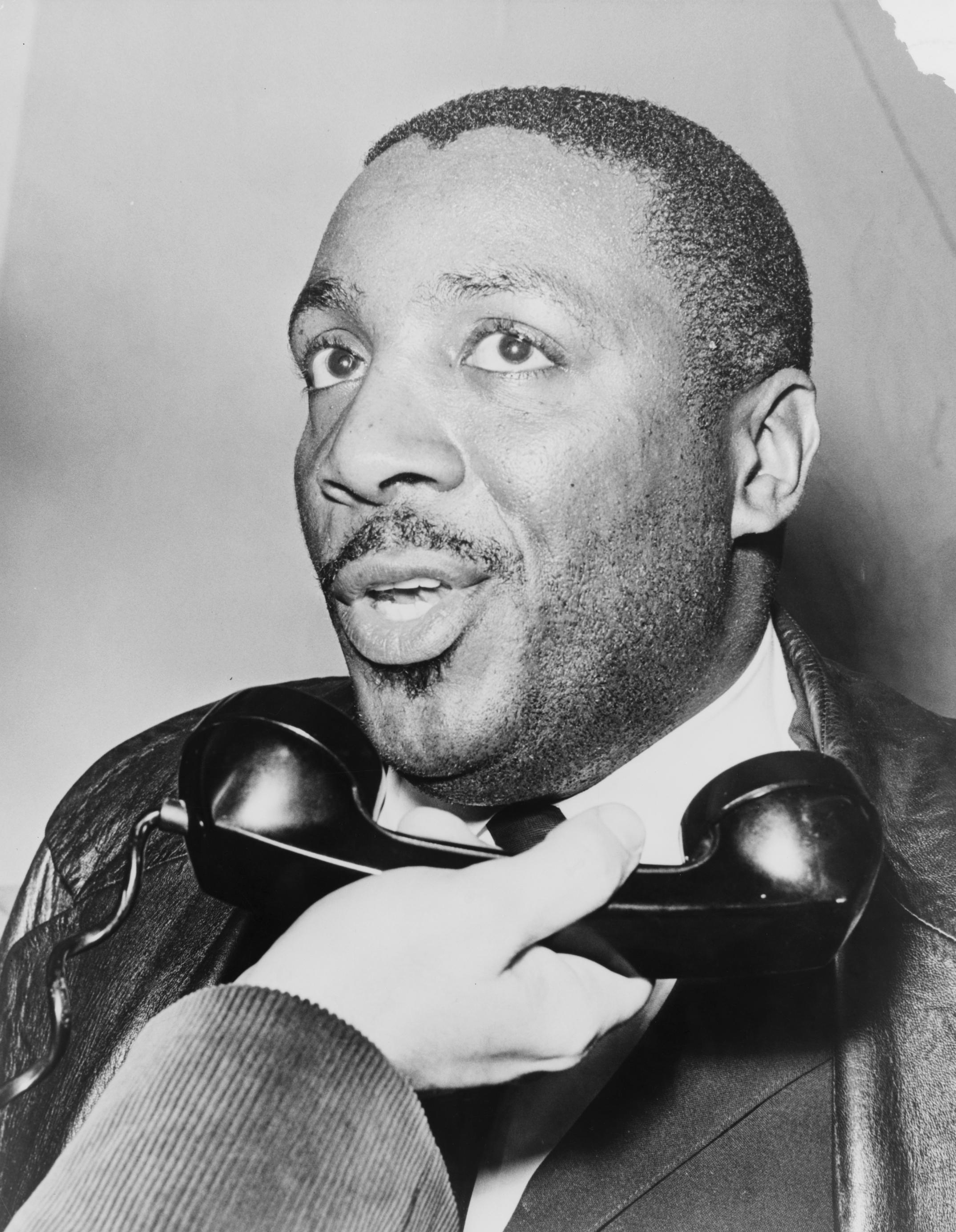
Dick Gregory

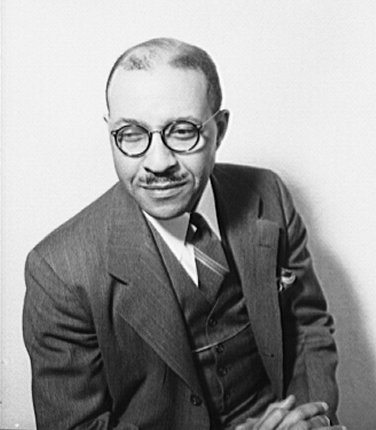
Charles S. Johnson

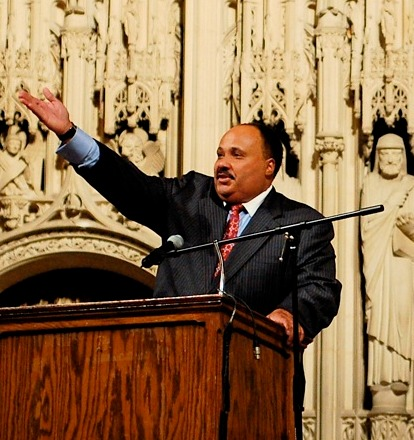
Martin Luther King III

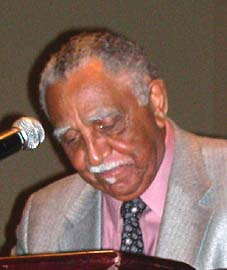
Joseph Lowery

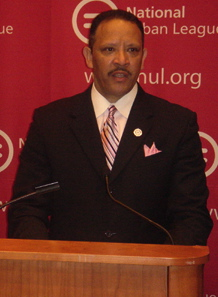
Marc Morial

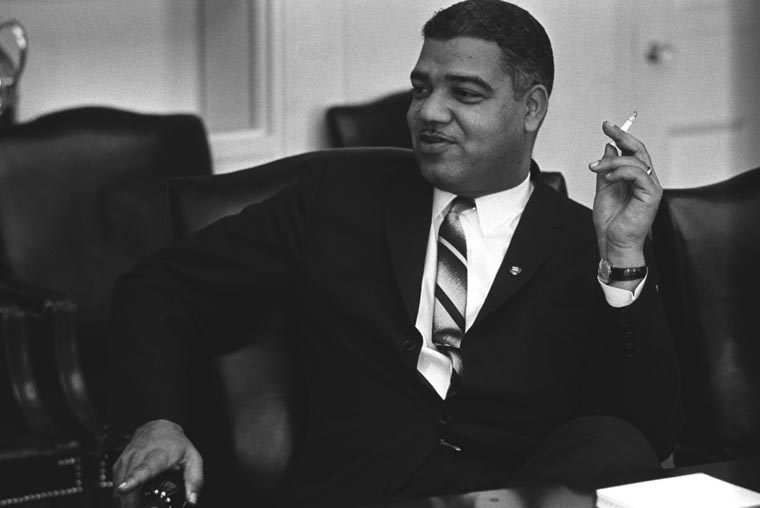
Whitney Young

== Sports ==
=== Olympics ===
Name	Original chapter	Notability	Ref.
Dave Albritton	Kappa	1936 Olympian, high jump; inducted into the USA Track & Field Hall of Fame, 1980	
Don Barksdale	Gamma Xi	1948 Olympian and first African American to play with the USA Olympic Basketball Team; NBA player	
Walt Bellamy	Gamma Eta	1960 Olympian NBA player; NBA Rookie of the Year (1962); NBA Hall of Fame (1993)	
Quinn Buckner	Gamma Eta	1976 Olympian; NBA player	
James Butts	Eta Pi Lambda	1976 Olympian, track and field	
Sayon Cooper	Delta Xi	2000 Olympian, track and field	
Otis Davis	Alpha Delta	Winner of two gold medals for record-breaking performances in both the 400 meters and 4x400 meters relay at the 1960 Summer Olympics	
Phil Edwards	Eta	Olympic athlete and winner of five bronze medals	
Edward Gourdin	Alpha Eta	1924 Olympian; first man to make 25 feet in the long jump	
Chris Huffins	Alpha Epsilon	Bronze medalist in the 2000 Olympics	
Larry James		1968 Olympian; 4x400 meter relay gold medalist, 400-meter race silver medalist	
Cornelius Johnson		1932 and 1936 Olympian; high jump	
Mel Lattany	Zeta Pi	Gold medal winner at the IAAF World Cup, Summer Universiade, and Liberty Bell Classic; was not able to compete in the 1980 Olympics due to the US boycott of Russia, but held the world record that year in 100m	
Ralph Metcalfe	Nu Xi	Representative from Illinois; 1932 and 1936 Olympian; the Ralph H. Metcalfe Federal Building in Chicago is named in his honor	
Manteo Mitchell	Nu Zeta	2012 silver medalist in track and field	
Godfrey Murray	Epsilon	1972 track and field Olympian	
Jesse Owens	Kappa	1936 Olympian in track and field; Associated Press Athlete of the Year, 1936; 1976 Presidential Medal of Freedom and 1990 Congressional Gold Medal recipient; namesake of the Jesse Owens Memorial Stadium at Ohio State University	
Fritz Pollard Jr.	Alpha Gamma	1936 Olympian, 110m hurdles	
Mike Powell	Omicron Eta	1988 and 1992 Olympian, long jump	
Andrew Stanfield	Alpha Alpha Lambda	1952 and 1956 Olympian, track and field	
Eddie Tolan	Epsilon	1932 Olympian, 100 and 200 meters	
Archibald Williams	Alpha Epsilon	1936 Olympian, track and field	
John Woodruff	Omicron	1936 Olympian, track and field	
Kevin Young	Gamma Xi	1988 and 1992 Olympian, track and field	

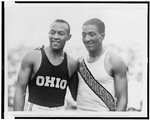
Jesse Owens and Ralph Metcalfe

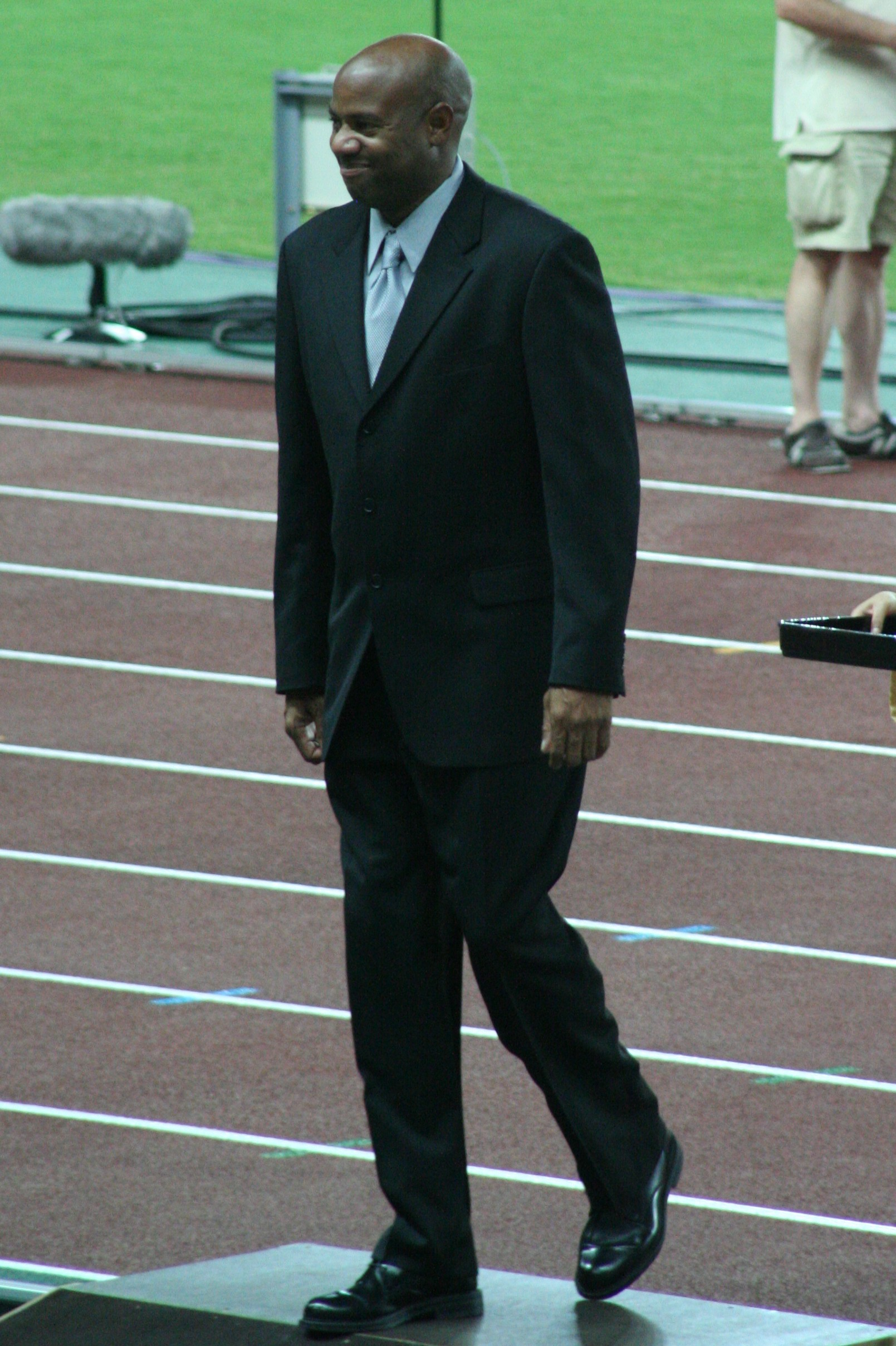
Mike Powell

=== Baseball ===
Name	Original chapter	Notability	Ref.
George Altman	Beta Omicron	Major League Baseball player	
Maceo Clark		Major League Baseball player and physician	
Gerald Williams		Major League Baseball player	

=== Basketball ===
Name	Original chapter	Notability	Ref.
Nate Archibald	Theta Delta Lambda	NBA player; Basketball Hall of Fame; voted one of the NBA 50 All-Time Greatest Players	
Don Barksdale	Gamma Xi	1948 Olympian and first African American to play with the USA Olympic Basketball Team; first African American consensus All American college basketball player; NBA player; first African American to play in the NBA All-Star game; Basketball Hall of Fame	
Walt Bellamy	Gamma Eta	1960 Olympian NBA player, Basketball Hall of Fame	
Junior Bridgeman	Delta Chi Lambda	NBA player; 12 years in the NBA; his number was retired by the Milwaukee Bucks	
Quinn Buckner	Gamma Eta	1976 Olympian; NBA player, 10 seasons in the NBA	
Robert Covington	Tau Lambda	NBA player, 11 seasons in the NBA; All-Defensive First Team	
Todd Day	Kappa Kappa	NBA player, nine seasons in the NBA	
Heyward Dotson	Eta	NBA player	
Wayne Embry	Delta Upsilon	NBA player and General Manager; five-time NBA All-Star; Basketball Hall of Fame	
Clyde Fletcher	Kappa Kappa	NBA player, player for Arkansas Razorbacks 1990 NCAA Final Four team	
Walt Frazier		NBA player; Basketball Hall of Fame; two-time NBA Champion; seven-time NBA All-Star, 4x All NBA First Team; two-time All NBA Second Team; seven-time All-Defensive First Team; NBA 50th Anniversary All-Time Team	
George Gregory	Eta	In 1931, the first black basketball player was selected as an All-American	
Dolly King		NBL player (predecessor of the NBA)	
Stan McKenzie	Delta Lambda	NBA player, seven seasons in the NBA	
Jim McMillian	Eta	NBA player; three-time college All-American; three-time Haggerty Award winner; nine seasons in the NBA	
Chris Mills	Eta Epsilon Lambda	NBA player, 10 seasons in the NBA	
Bobby Phills	Beta Sigma	NBA player, Continental Basketball Association player	
Garrett Temple	Nu Psi	NBA player, 14 seasons in the NBA	
Wes Unseld		NBA player and coach; Basketball Hall of Fame	
Walt Wesley	Upsilon	NBA player, ten seasons in the NBA	
Lenny Wilkens	Zeta Pi Lambda	NBA player and coach; second most wins all-time in NBA history; 1994 NBA Coach of the Year; 1996 Olympian; Basketball Coach; Basketball Hall of Fame; twice inducted into the Hall of Fame as both a player and a coach, the first and only African American so honored	
John "Hot Rod" Williams	Rho Iota	NBA player, 13 seasons in the NBA	

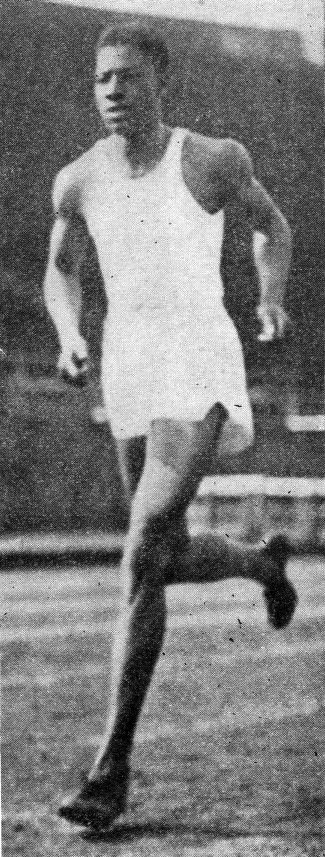
John Woodruff

=== Football ===
Name	Original chapter	Notability	Ref.
Emmanuel Arceneaux	Delta Kappa	NFL player, Minnesota Vikings, 2022 CFLPA's Tom Pate Outstanding Community Service Award recipient while playing for the Edmonton Elks	
Bobby Bell	Mu	National Football League (NFL) player, Pro Football Hall of Fame	
Gordon Bell	Epsilon	NFL player	
Khari Blasingame	Kappa Theta	NFL player	
Leroy Bolden	Gamma Tau	NFL player	
Jowon Briggs	Alpha Alpha	Professional football player; Cleveland Browns, defensive tackle	
Wes Chandler	Theta Sigma	NFL player; four-time Pro Bowl player; two-time college All American; 2014 College Football Hall of Fame inductee	
Michael Clayton	Nu Psi	NFL player	
Emerson Cole	Alpha Xi Lambda	NFL player; first African American to be drafted by the Cleveland Browns and a member of the 1950 NFL championship team; University of Toledo Hall of Fame	
Don Coleman	Gamma Tau	NFL player; first African American All-American football player at Michigan State University; first MSU player to have jersey retired; first African American to serve on the MSU coaching staff; member of the College Football Hall of Fame	
Greg Coleman	Beta Nu	NFL player; first African American punter in the NFL	
Marco Coleman	Nu Mu	NFL player; 14 seasons in the NFL; Pro Bowler	
Canute Curtis	Pi Mu	NFL player	
Garrett Dickerson	Alpha Mu	NFL player with the New York Giants	
Chris Doleman	Omicron	NFL player, Pro Football Hall of Fame; eight-time Pro Bowl selection; three-time First Team All-Pro selection; two-time Second Team All-Pro selection; four-time First Team All NFC; two-time Second Team All NFC; NFL 1990's All-Decade Team	
Donald Driver	Delta Kappa	NFL player; 14 years in the NFL; three-time Pro Bowler; 2017 Green Bay Packers Hall of Fame inductee; member of the Black College Football Hall of Fame, author	
Carl Eller	Mu	NFL player, 2004 Pro Football Hall of Fame	
Mel Farr Jr.	Gamma Xi	NFL player	
Mike Farr	Gamma Xi	NFL player	
Charles Fisher	Pi Mu	NFL player, 12 years in the NFL	
Julius Franks	Epsilon	First African American to become an All-American football player at the University of Michigan	
Kyle Fuller	Tau Alpha	NFL player	
Derrick Gaffney	Theta Sigma	NFL player, nine years in the NFL	
Nesby Glasgow	Alpha Xi	NFL player, 14 years in the NFL	
Barrett Green	Pi Mu	NFL player, seven years in the NFL	
Sammy Green	Theta Sigma	NFL player	
Rosey Grier	Gamma Nu	NFL player; two-time Pro Bowler; singer; actor; best known for The Thing with Two Heads; helped apprehend Sirhan Sirhan in the immediate aftermath of Robert F. Kennedy's assassination	
Charles Haley	Xi Delta	NFL player; 2015 Pro Football Hall of Fame; 5-time Super Bowl Champion (San Francisco 49ers 1988 & 1989; Dallas Cowboys 1992, 1993, & 1995); five-time Pro Bowl player	
P. J. Hall	Theta Mu	NFL player with the Oakland Raiders	
Jackie Harris	Delta Sigma Lambda	NFL player; 10 seasons in NFL	
Dennis Harrison	Kappa Theta	NFL player; played in Super Bowl XV and Pro Bowl	
T. J. Heath	Xi Xi	NFL player, Jacksonville Jaguars	
Darryl Henley	Gamma Xi	NFL player and college All-American	
Eddie Hinton	Zeta Zeta	NFL player, Baltimore Colts; played in Super Bowl V; former all-time leading receiver at the University of Oklahoma	
Darius Holland	Alpha Iota	NFL player, 10 seasons in the NFL	
Jalyx Hunt	Tau Tau	Professional football player; Philadelphia Eagles, defensive end	
Michael Hunter	Gamma Eta	NFL player	
Germain Ifedi	Pi Omicron	NFL player	
Duke Ihenacho	Epsilon Mu	NFL player	
Michael Jackson	Mu Xi	NFL player, 8 years in the NFL	
Charlie Janerette	Gamma Nu	NFL player, six years in the NFL, first African American to play against the all-White University of Alabama football team	
Trezelle Jenkins	Epsilon	NFL player	
Demetrious Johnson	Zeta Alpha	NFL player; founder of the Demetrious Johnson Charitable Foundation	
Ron Johnson	Epsilon	NFL player; two-time Pro Bowler; College Football Hall of Fame; college football All-American; chairman of the National Football Foundation	
Tyrell Johnson	Theta Upsilon	NFL player; starting strong safety for the Minnesota Vikings, 2008 to present	
Dhani Jones	Epsilon	NFL player, 11 seasons in the NFL; TV personality	
Jaryd Jones-Smith	Omicron	NFL player with the Houston Texans	
Steve Jordan	Alpha Gamma	NFL player; six-time Pro Bowler	
Lewis Kelly	Beta Delta	NFL player, 6 seasons	
Reggie Kelly	Kappa Beta	NFL player	
Carnell Lake	Gamma Xi	NFL player; five-time Pro Bowler; NFL 1990s All-Decade Team	
Henry Lawrence	Beta Nu	NFL player; two-time Pro Bowler	
Mark Lee	Alpha Xi	NFL player, 11 years in the NFL	
Mike Merriweather	Nu Chi	NFL player, three-time Pro Bowl player	
Ronald Moore	Gamma Chi	NFL player	
Bill Munsey	Mu	NFL player, CFL player	
Adrian Murrell	Pi Mu	NFL player, 10 years in the NFL	
Marques Murrell	Pi Nu	NFL player	
Vince Newsome	Alpha Xi	NFL player, current assistant director of pro personnel for Baltimore Ravens	
Roman Oben	Alpha Pi	NFL player, nine years in the NFL	
Brig Owens	Alpha Alpha	NFL player, 11 years in the NFL; included in the list of "70 Greatest Redskins"	
Michael Pittman Sr.	Epsilon Beta	NFL player, 10 years in the NFL	
Fritz Pollard	Alpha Gamma	One of the first two Black players in the NFL in 1920; first Black head coach in the NFL; 2005 Pro Football Hall of Fame	
Marcus Pollard	Epsilon Kappa	NFL player, 14 years in the NFL	
Jethro Pugh	Beta Zeta	NFL player, 13 years in the NFL	
Jay Ratliff	Omicron Kappa	NFL player; three-time Pro Bowl selection; First Team All-Pro selection	
Ken Riley	Beta Nu	NFL player, 15 years in the NFL, Pro Football Hall of Fame 2023	
Paul Robeson	Nu	NFL player; two-time college football All-American; College Football Hall of Fame; actor and singer; social activist; 1945 Spingarn Medal recipient; Stalin Peace Prize laureate	
Eddie Robinson	Beta Iota Lambda	Head of the Grambling State University football program for 56 years; the winningest coach in college football history; first coach to record 400 wins; 408 total career wins	
Darius Rush	Theta Nu	NFL player	
Bernard Russ	Pi Mu	NFL player	
Art Shell	Delta Nu	NFL player, four-time Pro Bowl player; Pro Football Hall of Fame; second Black head coach in the NFL	
Max Starks	Theta Sigma	NFL player, two-time Super Bowl Champion	
Sandy Stephens	Mu	NFL player; First African American All-American Quarterback, Rose Bowl Hall of Fame	
Lemuel Stinson	Eta Upsilon	NFL player	
Woody Strode	Alpha Delta	NFL player; one of the first two African-Americans to play in the NFL's modern (post-World War II) era; actor; nominated for a Golden Globe Award for Best Supporting Actor	
Billy Taylor	Epsilon	University of Michigan football All-American and school record holder of rushing yardage, CFL player	
Jesse Thomas	Gamma Tau	NFL player	
John Thornton	Pi Mu	NFL player, nine years in the NFL	
Willie Thrower	Gamma Tau	NFL player, first African American quarterback in the NFL modern era	
Wallace Triplett	Gamma Nu	NFL player, first African-American to be drafted into and play in the NFL	
Gene Upshaw	Gamma Chi Lambda	NFL and AFL player; 1987 Pro Football Hall of Fame; president of National Football League Players Association (NFLPA); NFLPA Headquarters building in Washington, D.C. named in his honor	
Anthony Walker Jr.	Alpha Mu	NFL player with the Indianapolis Colts	
Willis Ward	Epsilon	University of Michigan Athletic Hall of Fame; second African American to letter in varsity football at Michigan; three-time track and field All-American and eight-time Big Ten champion; famous for being excluded from the 1934 Michigan vs. Georgia Tech football game due to being African American	
Kenny Washington	Alpha Delta	One of the first two African-Americans to play in the NFL's modern (post-World War II) era; member of the College Football Hall of Fame	
Gerald Williams	Omicron Kappa	NFL player; 11 seasons in the NFL	
J. Mayo Williams	Alpha Gamma	NFL player; one of the first African Americans to play professional football; recording artist elected to the Blues Hall of Fame	
Reggie Williams	Theta Zeta	NFL player; 2007 College Football Hall of Fame Inductee; 1986 NFL Man of the Year; 1987 Sports Illustrated Co-Sportsman of the Year; former Cincinnati City Councilman	
Eric C. Wright	Zeta Alpha	NFL player, two-time Pro Bowl player	
Jason Wright	Alpha Mu	NFL player, businessman, team president of the Washington Football Team; first and only African American NFL team president	

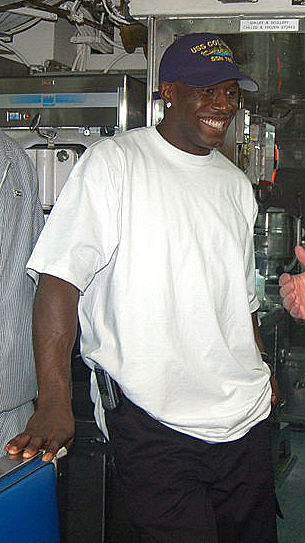
Donald Driver

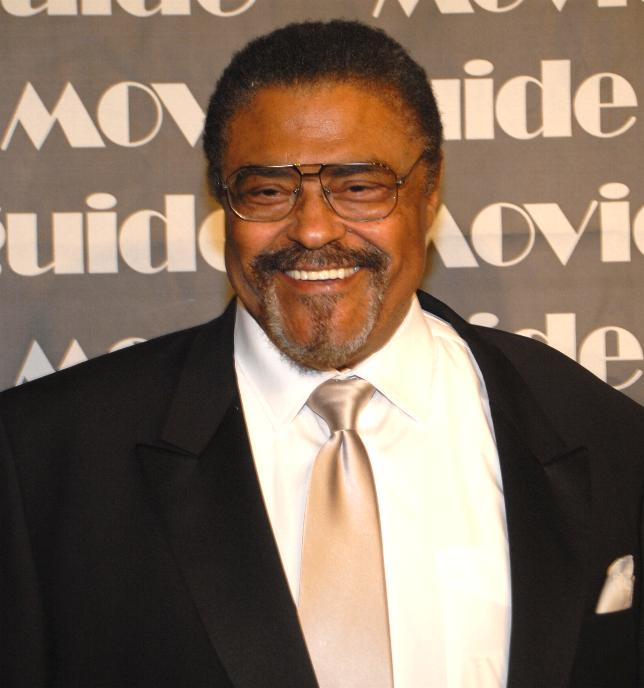
Rosey Grier

Paul Robeson

=== Other sports ===
Name	Original chapter	Notability	Ref.
Gerald Harris	Pi	Professional MMA fighter; The Ultimate Fighter (UFC), FCF, TFC, and International Fight League	
Eulace Peacock	Psi	Member of the National Track and Field Hall of Fame; rival of Jesse Owens	

== See also ==
- List of Alpha Phi Alpha chapters
