= List of Alpha Phi Alpha chapters =

Alpha Phi Alpha is an international fraternity established at Cornell University in 1906 as the first intercollegiate fraternity for African American men. As of 2023, Alpha Phi Alpha has chartered 979 chapters; 686 chapters are active in the United States and the Bahamas, Bermuda, Canada, Germany, Korea, and the Virgin Islands.

== Collegiate chapters ==
In the following list of chapters, active chapters are indicated in bold and inactive chapters are in italics.

Key no.	Chapter	Charter date and range	Founding location	City or county	State, territory, or country	Status	Ref.
1	**Alpha**	December 4, 1906	Cornell University	Ithaca	New York	Active	
2	**Beta**	December 20, 1907	Howard University	Washington	D.C.	Active	
3	**Gamma**	December 30, 1907	Virginia Union University	Richmond	Virginia	Active	(Note: Chapter formed at Hartshorn Memorial College which became Virginia Union University.)
4	Delta First (see Sigma Iota)	April 11, 1908 – 1909	University of Toronto	Toronto	Ontario, Canada	Inactive, Reestablished	(Note: After going dormant, this chapter reformed as Sigma Iota.)
5	**Epsilon**	April 10, 1909	University of Michigan	Ann Arbor	Michigan	Active	
6	**Zeta**	April 10, 1909 – 1957; xxxx ?	Yale University	New Haven	Connecticut	Active	
7	**Eta**	June 5, 1909	Columbia University	New York City	New York	Active	(Note: This citywide chapter includes Columbia University, City College of New York, Hunter College, and John Jay College of Criminal Justice.)
8	**Theta**	February 21, 1910	University of Illinois Chicago, Loyola University Chicago, and University of Chicago	Chicago	Illinois	Active	(Note: Chapter's original charter included the University of Chicago, Northwestern University, and the University of Illinois Urbana-Champaign.)
9	Iota (see **Delta Zeta**)	March 28, 1910–1923	Syracuse University	Syracuse	New York	Inactive, Reestablished	
10	**Kappa**	January 13, 1911	Ohio State University	Columbus	Ohio	Active	(Note: Chapter formed by absorbing the Omusu Society (local), established in 1907.)
11	**Mu**	April 12, 1912	University of Minnesota	Minneapolis and Saint Paul	Minnesota	Active	(Note: Chapter formed by absorbing Phi Alpha Tau (local), established in 1911.)
12	**Nu**	November 22, 1912	Lincoln University	Lincoln University	Pennsylvania	Active	
13	**Xi**	December 14, 1912	Wilberforce University	Wilberforce	Ohio	Active	
14	**Omicron**	January 30, 1913	University of Pittsburgh and Carnegie Mellon University	Pittsburgh	Pennsylvania	Active	(Note: Chapter formed by absorbing Phi Lambda Mu (local), established in 1911.)
15	**Pi**	May 14, 1914	Case Western Reserve University	Cleveland	Ohio	Active	
16	Rho (See **Psi** and **Pi Rho**)	November 3, 1914 – xxxx ?	Philadelphia Citywide	Philadelphia	Pennsylvania	Merged	(Note: The collegiate members of this chapter merged with the Psi chapter, except for Temple University which formed the Pi Rho chapter. Rho became an alumni chapter with the same name.)
17	**Sigma**	November 28, 1915	Boston Citywide	Boston	Massachusetts	Active	(Note: This citywide chapter includes Boston University, Northeastern University, Bentley College, UMass Boston, and Boston College.)
18	**Tau**	March 23, 1917	University of Illinois Urbana-Champaign	Champaign and Urbana	Illinois	Active	(Note: Chapter formed by absorbing Beta Phi (local), established in 1915.)
19	**Upsilon**	December 21, 1917	University of Kansas	Lawrence	Kansas	Active	(Note: Chapter formed by absorbing Rho Omega (local).)
20	**Phi**	May 17, 1919 – 1922; 1950	Ohio University	Athens	Ohio	Active	
21	**Chi**	December 5, 1919	Meharry Medical College	Nashville	Tennessee	Active	
22	**Psi** (see Rho)	January 21, 1920	University of Pennsylvania, Drexel University, and Villanova University	Philadelphia	Pennsylvania	Active	(Note: Chapter originally included just the University of Pennsylvania but expanded when it merged with Rho.)
23	**Alpha Alpha**	December 20, 1920	University of Cincinnati	Cincinnati	Ohio	Active	
24	**Alpha Beta**	April 25, 1921	Talladega College	Talladega	Alabama	Active	
25	**Alpha Gamma**	February 2, 1921 – 1948; xxxx ?	Brown University and Johnson & Wales University	Providence	Rhode Island	Active	
26	**Alpha Delta**	February 2, 1921	University of Southern California	Los Angeles	California	Active	(Note: Chapter formed by absorbing the University Students Club (local).)
28	**Alpha Zeta**	December 23, 1921	West Virginia State University	Institute	West Virginia	Active	
27	**Alpha Epsilon**	January 17, 1922	University of California, Berkeley	Berkeley	California	Active	(Note: Chapter formed by absorbing the Aeropaghus Club (local), established in 1919.)
29	Alpha Eta First (see **Rho Nu**)	January 21, 1922–1942	Harvard University	Cambridge	Massachusetts	Inactive, Reestablished	(Note: Rho Nu chapter now includes Harvard University.)
30	**Alpha Theta**	March 11, 1922 – 1948; 19xx ?	University of Iowa	Iowa City	Iowa	Active	(Note: Chapter formed by absorbing the Pendennis Club (local).)
31 ?	Alpha Iota	1922–19xx ?	Denver Citywide	Denver	Colorado	Inactive	
32	**Alpha Kappa**	October 17, 1922 – 1949; xxxx ?	American International College, Amherst College, and University of Massachusetts Amherst	Springfield	Massachusetts	Active	
33	**Alpha Mu**	October 21, 1922	Northwestern University	Evanston	Illinois	Active	
34	Alpha Nu (see **Omicron Pi**)	1922–1949	Iowa State University	Ames	Iowa	Inactive, Reestablished	(Note: After going dormant, this chapter reformed as Omicron Pi.)
35	Alpha Xi First (see Nu Xi)	1923–1958	Marquette University	Milwaukee	Wisconsin	Inactive, Reestablished	(Note: After going dormant, this chapter reformed as Nu Xi.)
36	**Alpha Omicron**	May 4, 1923	Johnson C. Smith University	Charlotte	North Carolina	Active	
37	Alpha Pi First (see **Alpha Phi**)	1924–19xx ?	Clark Atlanta University	Atlanta	Georgia	Inactive	
38	**Alpha Rho**	January 5, 1924	Morehouse College	Atlanta	Georgia	Active	(Note: This chapter was created by undergraduate members of the mixed graduate and collegiate Eta Lambda.)
39	Alpha Sigma	April 6, 1925	Wiley College	Marshall	Texas	Active	
40	Alpha Tau	May 9, 1925 – xxxx ?	University of Akron	Akron	Ohio	Inactive	(Note: Chapter formed by absorbing the local group, Sphinx.)
41	**Alpha Upsilon**	March 27, 1926	Wayne State University	Detroit	Michigan	Active	(Note: Chapter formed by absorbing Rho Omega (local), established in 1924.)
45	**Beta Alpha**	December 22, 1926	Morgan State University	Baltimore	Maryland	Active	(Note: Chapter formed by absorbing the Strivers Club (local), established in 1926.)
47	**Beta Gamma**	December 22, 1926	Virginia State University	Ettrick	Virginia	Active	
42	**Alpha Phi**	January 28, 1927	Clark Atlanta University	Atlanta	Georgia	Active	(Note: Chapter formed by absorbing the Oasis Club (local), 1926.)
46	**Beta Beta**	May 7, 1927 – 1958; xxxx ?	University of Nebraska–Lincoln	Lincoln	Nebraska	Active	
43	**Alpha Chi**	December 4, 1927	Fisk University	Nashville	Tennessee	Active	
48	**Beta Delta**	March 23, 1929	South Carolina State University	Orangeburg	South Carolina	Active	
49	**Beta Epsilon**	March 28, 1929	North Carolina A&T State University	Greensboro	North Carolina	Active	
50	Beta Zeta First	May 4, 1929–1952	Samuel Huston College	Austin	Texas	Inactive	(Note: Chapter formed by absorbing Phi Sigma Lambda (local).)
44	**Alpha Psi**	May 24, 1930	Lincoln University	Jefferson City	Missouri	Active	
52	Beta Theta	March 5, 1932–xxxx ?	Bluefield State College	Bluefield	West Virginia	Inactive	(Note: Chapter formed by absorbing the West Hall Collegiate Club (local).)
54	**Beta Kappa**	March 12, 1932	Langston University	Langston	Oklahoma	Active	(Note: Chapter formed by absorbing the Ionian Club (local).)
56	**Beta Nu**	April 23, 1932	Florida A&M University	Tallahassee	Florida	Active	
55	**Beta Mu**	April 28, 1932	Kentucky State University	Frankfort	Kentucky	Active	
51	**Beta Eta**	April 12, 1934	Southern Illinois University Carbondale	Carbondale	Illinois	Active	(Note: Chapter was formed at Southern Illinois State Normal School, which is now Southern Illinois University at Carbondale.)
57	**Beta Xi**	April 28, 1934	LeMoyne–Owen College	Memphis	Tennessee	Active	
37	**Alpha Pi**	May 7, 1934	University of Louisville	Louisville	Kentucky	Active	(Note: Chapter formed at Louisville Municipal College, a Negro college affiliated with University of Louisville)
58	**Beta Omicron**	May 7, 1934	Tennessee State University	Nashville	Tennessee	Active	
53	Beta Iota	December 6, 1935–19xx ?	Kalamazoo, MI Citywide	Kalamazoo	Michigan	Inactive	
59	**Beta Pi**	February 21, 1936	Lane College	Jackson	Tennessee	Active	
63	**Beta Upsilon**	April 15, 1936	Alabama State University	Montgomery	Alabama	Active	
60	**Beta Rho**	December 31, 1936	Shaw University	Raleigh	North Carolina	Active	
61	**Beta Sigma**	1936	Southern University	Baton Rouge	Louisiana	Active	
62	**Beta Tau**	March 29, 1936 – 1955; 19xx ?	Xavier University	New Orleans	Louisiana	Active	
64	**Beta Phi**	November 11, 1938	Dillard University	New Orleans	Louisiana	Active	
65	**Beta Chi**	May 21, 1938	Philander Smith College	Little Rock	Arkansas	Active	
66	Beta Psi First	1938–1952	London, England (Citywide)	London	England	Active	
35	**Alpha Xi**	December 31, 1939	University of Washington	Seattle	Washington	Active	(Note: Originally operated as a citywide chapter.)
9	**Iota**	March 10, 1941–2002; 2023	Morris Brown College	Atlanta	Georgia	Active	
67	**Gamma Alpha**	December 7, 1941	Texas College	Tyler	Texas	Active	
68	**Gamma Beta**	May 23, 1941	North Carolina Central University	Durham	North Carolina	Active	
29	**Alpha Eta**	January 17, 1942	Saint Louis University	St. Louis	Missouri	Active	
69	**Gamma Gamma**	May 1, 1946	Allen University	Columbia	South Carolina	Active	
70	**Gamma Delta**	March 25, 1946	University of Arkansas at Pine Bluff	Pine Bluff	Arkansas	Active	
71	**Gamma Epsilon**	December 7, 1946	University of Wisconsin–Madison	Madison	Wisconsin	Active	
72	**Gamma Zeta**	November 11, 1946	Fort Valley State University	Fort Valley	Georgia	Active	
73	**Gamma Eta**	January 1, 1947	Indiana University Bloomington	Bloomington	Indiana	Active	
74	**Gamma Theta**	May 3, 1947	University of Dayton	Dayton	Ohio	Active	
75	**Gamma Iota**	February 9, 1947	Hampton University	Hampton	Virginia	Active	
76	**Gamma Kappa**	April 17, 1947	Miles College	Fairfield	Alabama	Active	
77	**Gamma Mu**	February 27, 1947	Livingstone College	Salisbury	North Carolina	Active	
78	**Gamma Nu**	April 10, 1947	Pennsylvania State University	University Park	Pennsylvania	Active	
79 ?	**Gamma Xi**	February 24, 1947 – 1959; 19xx ?	University of California, Los Angeles	Los Angeles	California	Active	
80	Gamma Omicron	March 14, 1947	Knoxville College	Knoxville	Tennessee	Inactive	
81	**Gamma Pi**	May 9, 1947	Benedict College	Columbia	South Carolina	Active	
82	**Gamma Rho**	April 24, 1948	Purdue University	West Lafayette	Indiana	Active	
83	**Gamma Sigma**	February 7, 1948	Delaware State University	Dover	Delaware	Active	
84	Gamma Tau (see **Zeta Delta**)	May 1, 1948–1993	Michigan State University	East Lansing	Michigan	Inactive, Reestablished	(Note: After going dormant, this chapter reformed as Zeta Delta in 1966.)
85	**Gamma Upsilon**	February 27, 1949	Tougaloo College	Jackson	Mississippi	Active	
86	**Gamma Phi**	April 15, 1948	Tuskegee University	Tuskegee	Alabama	Active	(Note: Chapter formed by absorbing the Sphinx Club (local), established in 1947.)
87	**Gamma Chi**	April 3, 1948 – 1953; 19xx ?	Pittsburg State University	Pittsburg	Kansas	Active	
88	**Gamma Psi**	March 15, 1948	St. Augustine's University	Raleigh	North Carolina	Active	
89	**Delta Alpha**	March 26, 1948	Clafin College	Orangeburg	South Carolina	Active	
90	**Delta Beta**	April 21, 1948	Bethune–Cookman University	Daytona Beach	Florida	Active	
91	**Delta Gamma**	April 13, 1948	Alabama A&M University	Normal	Alabama	Active	
92	**Delta Delta**	May 29, 1948	Albany State University	Albany	Georgia	Active	
93	**Delta Epsilon**	April 23, 1949	University at Buffalo	Buffalo	New York	Active	
94	**Delta Zeta** (see Iota)	April 28, 1949 – 1952; 19xx ?	Syracuse University	Syracuse	New York	Active	(Note: An earlier chapter at Syracuse University was called Iota.)
95	**Delta Eta**	April 28, 1948	Savannah State University	Savannah	Georgia	Active	
96	**Delta Theta**	May 7, 1949	Texas Southern University	Houston	Texas	Active	
97	**Delta Iota**	January 1, 1950 – 1960; 1975	Rutgers University–New Brunswick	New Brunswick	New Jersey	Active	
98	**Delta Kappa**	March 18, 1950	Alcorn State University	Lorman	Mississippi	Active	
99	**Delta Mu**	March 25, 1950 – 1961; 19xx ?	Wichita State University	Wichita	Kansas	Active	
100	**Delta Nu**	May 27, 1948	University of Maryland Eastern Shore	Princess Anne	Maryland	Active	
300	**Delta Xi**	January 8, 1951	Central State University	Wilberforce	Ohio	Active	
301 ?	Delta Omicron (see **Nu Sigma**)	1951–19xx ?	Stanford University	Stanford	California	Inactive, Reestablished	(Note: After going dormant, this chapter reformed as Nu Sigma.)
302	**Delta Pi**	April 6, 1951	Cheyney University of Pennsylvania	Cheyney	Pennsylvania	Active	
53	**Beta Iota**	December 6, 1951	Winston-Salem State University	Winston-Salem	North Carolina	Active	
303	**Delta Rho**	March 12, 1952	University of Missouri–Kansas City and Rockhurst University	Kansas City	Missouri	Active	
304	Delta Sigma	June 11, 1952	Grambling State University	Grambling	Louisiana	Active	
305	Delta Tau	November 22, 1952–xxxx ?	Saint Paul's College	Lawrenceville	Virginia	Inactive	
50	**Beta Zeta**	February 21, 1953	Elizabeth City State University	Elizabeth City	North Carolina	Active	
306	**Delta Upsilon**	March 9, 1953	Miami University	Oxford	Ohio	Active	
307	**Delta Phi**	March 3, 1953	Jackson State University	Jackson	Mississippi	Active	
308	**Delta Chi**	June 3, 1953	Brooklyn College, St. Francis College, and LIU Brooklyn	Brooklyn, New York City	New York	Active	
309	**Delta Psi**	January 1, 1954	Florida Memorial University	Miami Gardens	Florida	Active	
4	**Delta (Second)**	January 1, 1954	Huston–Tillotson University	Austin	Texas	Active	
66	**Beta Psi (Second)**	195x ?–1958, 2011	Richmond, The American International University in London and University of Westminster	London	England	Active	
310	**Epsilon Alpha**	May 15, 1954	University of Toledo	Toledo	Ohio	Active	
311	**Epsilon Beta**	September 1, 1956	California State University, Fresno	Fresno	California	Active	
312	Epsilon Gamma	1957–1988	Bishop College	Marshall	Texas	Inactive	
313	**Epsilon Delta**	January 22, 1958	Kent State University	Kent	Ohio	Active	
314	**Epsilon Epsilon**	April 25, 1958	Oklahoma State University–Stillwater	Stillwater	Oklahoma	Active	
315	**Epsilon Zeta**	November 3, 1958	Fayetteville State University	Fayetteville	North Carolina	Active	
316	**Epsilon Eta**	June 5, 1959	Eastern Michigan University	Ypsilanti	Michigan	Active	
317	**Epsilon Theta**	May 15, 1959	Bowling Green State University	Bowling Green	Ohio	Active	
318 ?	**Epsilon Iota**	March 5, 1960	University of Texas at Austin	Austin	Texas	Active	
319	Epsilon Kappa	December 16, 1961 – xxxx ?	Bradley University	Peoria	Illinois	Inactive	
320	**Epsilon Mu**	March 6, 1962	San Jose State University	San Jose	California	Active	
321	**Epsilon Nu**	November 10, 1962	Stillman College	Tuscaloosa	Alabama	Active	
322	**Epsilon Xi**	October 10, 1962	Western Michigan University	Kalamazoo	Michigan	Active	
323	Epsilon Omicron	1962–xxxx ?	Washburn University	Topeka	Kansas	Inactive	
324	**Epsilon Pi**	October 12, 1962	Norfolk State University	Norfolk	Virginia	Active	
325	**Epsilon Rho**	1963	Lamar University	Beaumont	Texas	Active	
326	**Epsilon Sigma**	January 18, 1964	University of Texas at San Antonio and St. Mary's University, Texas	San Antonio	Texas	Active	
327	**Epsilon Tau**	May 13, 1964	University of Wisconsin–Milwaukee	Milwaukee	Wisconsin	Active	
328	**Epsilon Upsilon**	May 22, 1964	Southern University at New Orleans	New Orleans	Louisiana	Active	
329	**Epsilon Phi**	May 4, 1964	Northern Illinois University	DeKalb	Illinois	Active	
330	Epsilon Chi	April 1, 1965	University of Kentucky	Lexington	Kentucky	Active	
331	**Epsilon Psi**	April 27, 1965	Missouri University of Science and Technology	Rolla	Missouri	Active	
332	**Zeta Alpha**	May 17, 1966	University of Missouri	Columbia	Missouri	Active	
333	**Zeta Beta**	1966	Ferris State University	Big Rapids	Michigan	Active	
334	**Zeta Gamma**	June 6, 1966	University of Central Missouri	Warrensburg	Missouri	Active	
335	**Zeta Delta** (see Gamma Tau)	1966	Michigan State University	East Lansing	Michigan	Active	(Note: Chapter was originally chartered as Gamma Tau.)
336	Zeta Epsilon	1967–xxxx ?	Barber–Scotia College	Concord	North Carolina	Inactive	
337	**Zeta Zeta**	1967	University of Oklahoma	Norman	Oklahoma	Active	
338	**Zeta Eta**	February 7, 1968	New York Institute of Technology; Baruch College; Pace University; Hunter College	New York City	New York	Active	(Note: Chapter originally formed at the New York Institute of Technology Manhattan and Baruch College.)
339 ?	Zeta Theta	1968–19xx ?	University of Arizona	Tucson	Arizona	Inactive	
340	**Zeta Iota**	April 14, 1968	University of Wisconsin–Whitewater	Whitewater	Wisconsin	Active	
341 ?	Zeta Kappa	1968–xxxx ?	University of Texas at El Paso	El Paso	Texas	Inactive	
342	**Zeta Mu**	August 8, 1968	Georgia State University	Atlanta	Georgia	Active	
343	**Zeta Nu**	January 10, 1969	Eastern Illinois University	Charleston	Illinois	Active	(Note: Chapter was chartered at Theta Nu but became Zeta Nu in 1973.)
344	**Zeta Xi**	May 5, 1968	University of Louisiana at Lafayette	Lafayette	Louisiana	Active	
345	**Zeta Omicron**	January 11, 1969	Murray State University	Murray	Kentucky	Active	
346	**Zeta Pi**	May 10, 1969	University of Georgia	Athens	Georgia	Active	
347	**Zeta Rho**	May 9, 1969	Indiana State University	Terre Haute	Indiana	Active	
348	**Zeta Sigma**	November 3, 1969	University of Central Oklahoma	Edmond	Oklahoma	Active	
349	Zeta Tau	February 27, 1970–xxxx ?	East Texas A&M University	Commerce	Texas	Inactive	(Note: Texas A&M University at Commerce changed its name to East Texas A&M University on 7 November 2024.)
350	Zeta Upsilon	1970–xxxx ?	Northeastern State University	Tahlequah	Oklahoma	Inactive	
351	**Zeta Phi**	December 12, 1969–xxxx ?	Mississippi Valley State University	Mississippi Valley State	Mississippi	Active	
352	**Zeta Chi**	December 22, 1969	University of Texas at Arlington	Arlington	Texas	Active	
353	**Zeta Psi**	December 19, 1969	West Chester University	West Chester	Pennsylvania	Active	
354	**Eta Alpha**	April 2, 1970	Paine College	Augusta	Georgia	Active	
355	Eta Beta	1970–xxxx ?	University of Wisconsin–Platteville	Platteville	Wisconsin	Inactive	
356	**Eta Gamma**	May 15, 1970	Prairie View A&M University	Prairie View	Texas	Active	
357	**Eta Delta**	April 17, 1970	University of Miami	Coral Gables	Florida	Active	
358 ?	**Eta Epsilon**	April 19, 1970	University of North Texas	Denton	Texas	Active	
359	**Eta Zeta**	May 13, 1970	Bowie State College	Prince George's County	Maryland	Active	
360	**Eta Eta**	August 31, 1970	Western Illinois University	Macomb	Illinois	Active	
361	Eta Theta	1971–xxxx ?	East Central University	Ada	Oklahoma	Inactive	
362	**Eta Iota**	January 29, 1971	Voorhees University	Denmark	South Carolina	Active	
363	**Eta Kappa**	April 23, 1971	Louisiana Tech University	Ruston	Louisiana	Active	
364	**Eta Mu**	April 17, 1971	University of Houston	Houston	Texas	Active	
365	Eta Nu	April 3, 1971 – xxxx ?	East Carolina University	Greenville	North Carolina	Inactive	
366	Eta Xi	February 20, 1971–xxxx ?	University of Detroit	Detroit	Michigan	Inactive	
367	**Eta Omicron**	April 7, 1971	North Carolina State University	Raleigh	North Carolina	Active	
368	**Eta Pi**	June 17, 1971	University of Wisconsin–Oshkosh	Oshkosh	Wisconsin	Active	
369	**Eta Rho**	March 25, 1972	Western Kentucky University	Bowling Green	Kentucky	Active	
370	**Eta Sigma**	January 1, 1972	San Diego State University	San Diego	California	Active	
371	**Eta Tau**	October 9, 1971	Illinois State University	Normal	Illinois	Active	
372 ?	**Eta Upsilon**	January 13, 1972	Texas Tech University	Lubbock	Texas	Active	
373 ?	**Eta Phi**	November 11, 1971	University of Tennessee at Chattanooga	Chattanooga	Tennessee	Active	
374	**Eta Chi**	November 15, 1971	University of Louisiana at Monroe	Monroe	Louisiana	Active	
375 ?	**Eta Psi**	November 15, 1972	Texas Christian University	Fort Worth	Texas	Active	
376 ?	**Theta Alpha**	1972	Jarvis Christian College	Wood County	Texas	Active	
377 ?	**Theta Beta**	1972	Columbus State University	Columbus	Georgia	Active	
378	**Theta Gamma**	March 4, 1972	University of South Florida	Tampa	Florida	Active	
379	**Theta Delta**	February 12, 1972	University of South Alabama	Mobile	Alabama	Active	
380	**Theta Epsilon**	May 5, 1972	St. John's University	Jamaica, Queens	New York	Active	(Note: Chapter originally included both Adelphi University and St. Johns University.)
381	**Theta Zeta**	1972	Dartmouth College	Hanover	New Hampshire	Active	
382 ?	Theta Eta	1972–xxxx ?	University of California, Davis	Davis	California	Inactive	
383	**Theta Theta**	1973	McNeese State University	Lake Charles	Louisiana	Active	
384	Theta Iota	1973–xxxx ?	Virginia Tech	Blacksburg	Virginia	Inactive	
385	**Theta Kappa**	1973	Henderson State University	Arkadelphia	Arkansas	Active	
386 ?	**Theta Mu**	April 14, 1973	Sam Houston State University	Huntsville	Texas	Active	
387	**Theta Nu**	1973	University of South Carolina	Columbia	South Carolina	Active	
388	**Theta Xi**	January 6, 1973	Ball State University	Muncie	Indiana	Active	
389	**Theta Omicron**	May 7, 1973	Millikin University	Decatur	Illinois	Active	
390	Theta Pi	1973–xxxx ?	Austin Peay State University	Clarksville	Tennessee	Inactive	
391	**Theta Rho**	1973	Virginia Commonwealth University	Richmond	Virginia	Active	
392	**Theta Sigma**	August 9, 1973	University of Florida	Gainesville	Florida	Active	
393	**Theta Tau**	1973	University of Michigan–Flint, Kettering University, Baker College, and Mott Community College	Flint	Michigan	Active	
394	**Theta Upsilon**	1973	Arkansas State University	Jonesboro	Arkansas	Active	
395 ?	**Theta Phi**	1973	University of New Orleans	New Orleans	Louisiana	Active	
396	**Theta Chi**	1973	Northwestern State University	Natchitoches	Louisiana	Active	
397	Theta Psi	1973–xxxx ?	University of Central Arkansas	Conway	Arkansas	Inactive	
398	**Iota Alpha**	1973	Washington and Lee University and George Mason University	Lexington and Fairfax	Virginia	Active	
399	**Iota Beta**	1973	University of Virginia	Charlottesville	Virginia	Active	
400	Iota Gamma	1973–xxxx ?	Rust College	Holly Springs	Mississippi	Inactive	
401	**Iota Delta**	1974	Florida State University	Tallahassee	Florida	Active	
402	**Iota Epsilon**	1974	Grand Valley State University	Allendale	Michigan	Active	
403	**Iota Zeta**	1974	University of Maryland, College Park	College Park	Maryland	Active	
404	**Iota Eta**	1974	Mercer University	Macon	Georgia	Active	
405	Iota Theta	1974–xxxx ?	Calumet College of St. Joseph	Whiting	Indiana	Inactive	
406	**Iota Iota**	1974	The College of New Jersey	Ewing Township	New Jersey	Active	
407 ?	**Iota Kappa**	1974	Paul Quinn College	Dallas	Texas	Active	
408 ?	**Iota Mu**	1974	Stephen F. Austin State University	Nacogdoches	Texas	Active	
409	Iota Nu	October 11, 1974 – xxxx ?	University of Alabama at Birmingham	Birmingham	Alabama	Inactive	
410	**Iota Xi**	1974	Truman State University	Kirksville	Missouri	Active	
411	Iota Omicron (see Upsilon Mu)	1974–2005	Southern Methodist University	Dallas	Texas	Inactive, Reestablished	(Note: Chapter was removed from campus in 2005 for a hazing incident that took place in 2003.)
412	Iota Pi	April 8, 1974 – xxxx ?	Southern Illinois University Edwardsville	Edwardsville	Illinois	Inactive	
413	**Iota Rho**	1974	New Jersey Institute of Technology, Bloomfield College, Montclair State University, Kean University, and Rutgers University–Newark	Newark	New Jersey	Active	(Note: Chapter formed at the Newark Institute of Technology, now the New Jersey Institute of Technology.)
414	**Iota Sigma**	1974	Millersville University of Pennsylvania	Millersville	Pennsylvania	Active	
415 ?	**Iota Tau**	1974	Washington State University	Pullman	Washington	Active	
416 ?	Iota Upsilon	1974–xxxx ?	Utah State University	Logan	Utah	Inactive	
417	Iota Phi	1974–xxxx ?	University of Mount Union	Alliance	Ohio	Inactive	
419 ?	Iota Chi	1974–xxxx ?	University of Redlands	Redlands	California	Inactive	
418	**Iota Psi**	August 5, 1974	California State Polytechnic University, Pomona	Pomona	California	Active	
420	**Kappa Alpha**	December 2, 1974	University of Alabama	Tuscaloosa	Alabama	Active	
421	**Kappa Beta**	December 4, 1974	Mississippi State University	Starkville	Mississippi	Active	
422	**Kappa Gamma**	January 17, 1975	University of North Alabama	Florence	Alabama	Active	
423	**Kappa Delta**	1975	University of Connecticut, Trinity College, and Eastern Connecticut State University	Storrs	Connecticut	Active	
424	**Kappa Epsilon**	1975	Cameron University	Lawton	Oklahoma	Active	
425	**Kappa Zeta**	February 17, 1975	Pace University	New York City	New York	Active	(Note: Chapter originally included both Utica College and Pace University.)
426	Kappa Eta	1975–xxxx ?	University of Memphis	Memphis	Tennessee	Inactive	
427	**Kappa Theta**	1975	Vanderbilt University	Nashville	Tennessee	Active	
428	**Kappa Iota**	April 15, 1975	Southern Arkansas University	Magnolia	Arkansas	Active	
429	**Kappa Kappa**	April 27, 1975	University of Arkansas	Fayetteville	Arkansas	Active	
430	**Kappa Mu**	March 22, 1975	Nicholls State University	Thibodaux	Louisiana	Active	
431 ?	**Kappa Nu**	March 22, 1975	Southeastern Louisiana University	Hammond	Louisiana	Active	
432	**Kappa Xi**	March 25, 1975	Middle Tennessee State University	Murfreesboro	Tennessee	Active	
433	**Kappa Omicron**	December 7, 1975	Duke University	Durham	North Carolina	Active	
434	**Kappa Pi**	May 31, 1975	College of William & Mary	Williamsburg	Virginia	Active	
435	**Kappa Rho**	September 5, 1975	LIU Post	Brookville, Long Island	New York	Active	
436 ?	Kappa Sigma (see **Rho Mu**)	1975–xxxx ?	West Texas A&M University	Canyon	Texas	Inactive, Reestablished	(Note: Chapter was later re-established as Rho Mu.)
437 ?	**Kappa Tau**	April 15, 1976	Kansas State University	Manhattan	Kansas	Active	
438 ?	Kappa Upsilon	1975–xxxx ?	Edward Waters University	Jacksonville	Florida	Inactive	
439 ?	Kappa Phi	1975–xxxx ?	University of Liberia	Monrovia	Liberia	Inactive	
440	**Kappa Chi**	December 20, 1975	Francis Marion University	Florence	South Carolina	Active	
441 ?	**Kappa Psi**	1976	University of Arkansas at Little Rock	Little Rock	Arkansas	Active	
442 ?	**Mu Alpha**	1976	Emory University	Atlanta	Georgia	Active	
443 ?	Mu Beta	1976–xxxx ?	University of Tennessee at Martin	Martin	Tennessee	Inactive	
444 ?	**Mu Gamma**	1976	Georgia College & State University	Milledgeville	Georgia	Active	
445 ?	**Mu Delta**	1976	Georgia Southwestern State University	Americus	Georgia	Active	
446 ?	Mu Epsilon	1976–xxxx ?	Carthage College	Kenosha	Wisconsin	Inactive	
447 ?	**Mu Zeta**	April 15, 1976	University of North Carolina at Chapel Hill	Chapel Hill	North Carolina	Active	
448 ?	**Mu Eta**	April 26, 1976	Arizona State University	Tempe	Arizona	Active	
449	Mu Theta	May 21, 1976	University of West Florida	Pensacola	Florida	Inactive	
450 ?	Mu Iota	1976–xxxx ?	University of Tennessee	Knoxville	Tennessee	Inactive	
451 ?	**Mu Kappa**	1976	University of California, Santa Barbara	Santa Barbara	California	Active	
34	Alpha Nu	1976–xxxx ?	Drake University	Des Moines	Iowa	Inactive	
452 ?	**Mu Mu**	August 20, 1976	Elmhurst College	Elmhurst	Illinois	Active	
453 ?	**Mu Nu**	April 24, 1976	Texas State University	San Marcos	Texas	Active	
454 ?	**Mu Xi**	November 15, 1976	University of Southern Mississippi	Hattiesburg	Mississippi	Active	
455 ?	**Mu Omicron**	May 31, 1976	Valdosta State University	Valdosta	Georgia	Active	
457	**Mu Rho**	December 10, 1976	Towson University	Towson	Maryland	Active	
456 ?	**Mu Pi**	1977	Charleston Southern University	North Charleston	South Carolina	Active	
458	**Mu Sigma**	January 22, 1977	University of Rochester and Rochester Institute of Technology	Rochester	New York	Active	
459	**Mu Tau**	February 5, 1977	University of North Carolina at Charlotte	Charlotte	North Carolina	Active	
460	**Mu Upsilon**	April 6, 1977	Frostburg State University	Frostburg	Maryland	Active	
461	**Mu Phi**	January 11, 1977	University of Bridgeport	Bridgeport	Connecticut	Active	
462 ?	**Mu Chi**	April 27, 1977	California State University, Long Beach	Long Beach	California	Active	
463 ?	**Mu Psi**	1977	Southern Connecticut State University	New Haven	Connecticut	Active	
464	**Nu Alpha**	March 23, 1977	Arkansas Tech University	Russellville	Arkansas	Active	
465	**Nu Beta**	May 27, 1977	George Washington University and American University	Washington	D.C.	Active	
466 ?	Nu Gamma	1977–xxxx ?	University of West Georgia	Carrollton	Georgia	Inactive	
467	**Nu Delta**	June 11, 1977	Chicago State University	Chicago	Illinois	Active	
468	**Nu Epsilon**	September 1, 1977	Lewis University	Romeoville	Illinois	Active	
469	**Nu Zeta**	May 7, 1977	Western Carolina University	Cullowhee	North Carolina	Active	
470	Nu Eta	September 15, 1977	Rhodes College	Memphis	Tennessee	Inactive	
471	**Nu Theta**	April 24, 1977	Old Dominion University	Norfolk	Virginia	Active	
472	**Nu Iota**	1977	Rowan University and Rutgers University–Camden	Glassboro	New Jersey	Active	
473	Nu Kappa	December 16, 1977	University of Maryland, Baltimore County	Baltimore County	Maryland	Active	
474	Nu Mu	April 2, 1977	Georgia Institute of Technology	Atlanta	Georgia	Active	
479	**Nu Rho**	December 22, 1977	DePaul University and Illinois Institute of Technology	Chicago	Illinois	Active	
475	**Nu Nu**	May 16, 1978	Marshall University	Huntington	West Virginia	Active	
476 ?	**Nu Xi** (see Alpha Xi)	197x ?	Marquette University	Milwaukee	Wisconsin	Active	(Note: The first chapter at Marquette was Alpha Xi.)
477 ?	Nu Omicron	197x ?–xxxx ?	Carroll College	Helena	Montana	Inactive	
478 ?	Nu Pi (see Rho Tau Second)	197x ?–20xx ?	University of Evansville	Evansville	Indiana	Consolidated	(Note: Chapter merged with Rho Tau chapter.)
480 ?	**Nu Sigma** (see Delta Omicron)	March 20, 1978	Stanford University	Stanford	California	Active	(Note: The first chapter at Stanford was Delta Omicron.)
481	**Nu Tau**	April 28, 1978	University of Montevallo	Montevallo	Alabama	Active	
482 ?	Nu Upsilon	1978–xxxx ?	University of Mississippi	Oxford	Mississippi	Inactive	
483	**Nu Phi**	1978	Coastal Carolina University	Conway	South Carolina	Active	
484 ?	Nu Chi	197x ?–xxxx ?	University of the Pacific	Stockton	California	Inactive	
485 ?	Nu Psi	May 22, 1978 – October 1, 2021	Louisiana State University	Baton Rouge	Louisiana	Inactive	(Note: Chapter was suspended for hazing for two years, through August 31, 2023.)
486 ?	**Xi Alpha**	1978	Morehead State University	Morehead	Kentucky	Active	
487 ?	**Xi Beta**	May 27, 1978	Troy University	Troy	Alabama	Active	
488	**Xi Gamma**	1979	Southeast Missouri State University	Cape Girardeau	Missouri	Active	
489	**Xi Delta**	1979	James Madison University	Harrisonburg	Virginia	Active	
490 ?	**Xi Epsilon**	1979	Morris College	Sumter	South Carolina	Active	
491	Xi Zeta (First)	September 17, 1979 – 19xx ?	Hampden–Sydney College	Keysville	Virginia	Reassigned	
492 ?	**Xi Eta**	May 4, 1974 – 19xx ?. 1990	Wake Forest University	Winston-Salem	North Carolina	Active	
493 ?	**Xi Iota**	June 16, 1979	University of Central Florida	Orlando	Florida	Active	
494 ?	Xi Kappa	19xx ?–19xx ?	Florida Institute of Technology	Melbourne	Florida	Inactive	
495 ?	Xi Mu (see **Rho Pi**)	19xx ?–19xx ?	Slippery Rock University	Slippery Rock	Pennsylvania	Merged	(Note: Chapter merged with Rho Pi.)
470 ?	**Nu Eta**	1980	Christian Brothers University	Memphis	Tennessee	Active	
	Xi Nu	1980–xxxx ?	Emporia State University	Emporia, Kansas	Kansas	Inactive	
	**Xi Xi**	June 15, 1980	Jacksonville State University	Jacksonville	Alabama	Active	
499	**Xi Omicron**	1980	University of Delaware	Newark	Delaware	Active	
	**Xi Pi**	May 8, 1980	California State University, East Bay	Hayward	California	Active	
	**Xi Rho**	May 14, 1980	San Francisco State University	San Francisco	California	Active	
703	**Xi Tau**	July 12, 1980	Georgia Southern University	Statesboro	Georgia	Active	
702	**Xi Sigma**	July 22, 1980	Indiana University of Pennsylvania	Indiana County	Pennsylvania	Active	
704 ?	Xi Upsilon	19xx ?–xxxx ?	California Polytechnic State University, San Luis Obispo	San Luis Obispo	California	Inactive	
705	**Xi Phi**	April 12, 1980	Winthrop University	Rock Hill	South Carolina	Active	
706 ?	Xi Chi First					Reassigned	
707	**Xi Psi**	August 6, 1980	Hofstra University	Nassau County	New York	Active	
708 ?	Omicron Alpha	1980–xxxx ?	Auburn University at Montgomery	Montgomery	Alabama	Inactive	
709	**Omicron Beta**	December 9, 1980	Barton College and North Carolina Wesleyan University	Wilson	North Carolina	Active	
710 ?	**Omicron Gamma**	1981	Millsaps College and Bellhaven University	Jackson	Mississippi	Active	
711 ?	Omicron Delta First (see **Tau Sigma**)	1980–xxxx ?	University of New Mexico	Albuquerque	New Mexico	Inactive, Reestablished	(Note: Chapter was reestablished as Tau Sigma in November 2003.)
712 ?	Omicron Epsilon	198x ?–202x ?	Youngstown State University	Youngstown	Ohio	Inactive	
713	**Omicron Zeta**	1980	Fairleigh Dickinson University	Madison	New Jersey	Active	
714 ?	Omicron Eta	19xx ?				Inactive	
715 ?	**Omicron Theta**	May 5, 1981	University of North Carolina Wilmington	Wilmington	North Carolina	Active	
716 ?	Omicron Iota	October 10, 1981 – 1998	DePaul University	Chicago	Illinois	Inactive	
717	**Omicron Kappa**	May 29, 1982	Auburn University	Auburn	Alabama	Active	
718 ?	Omicron Mu (see **Tau Kappa**)	March 19, 1982	Oakland University	Detroit	Michigan	Inactive, Reestablished	(Note: Chapter reformed as Tau Kappa.)
719	Omicron Nu	1982–xxxx ?	University of Tulsa	Tulsa	Oklahoma	Inactive	
720	**Omicron Xi**	February 27, 1982	Roosevelt University and Columbia College Chicago	Chicago	Illinois	Active	
722	**Omicron Pi** (see Alpha Nu)	May 2, 1982	Iowa State University	Ames, Iowa	Iowa	Active	(Note: This is the re-established Alpha Nu chapter.)
721	**Omicron Omicron**	May 15, 1982	University of the District of Columbia	Washington	D.C.	Active	
723 ?	Omicron Rho	1982–xxxx ?	Ohio Wesleyan University and Otterbein University	Delaware and Westerville	Ohio	Inactive	
724 ?	Omicron Sigma	1982–xxxx ?	Birmingham–Southern College	Birmingham	Alabama	Inactive	
725	**Omicron Tau**	October 23, 1982 – xxxx ?; 2003	Colorado State University, University of Northern Colorado, University of Colorado Boulder, Metropolitan State University of Denver, and University of Denver	Greeley	Colorado	Active	(Note: Chapter was chartered at Colorado State University and expanded to include other campuses.)
726	**Omicron Upsilon**	1982	Rensselaer Polytechnic Institute	Troy	New York	Active	
727	**Omicron Phi**	November 23, 1982	Tennessee Tech	Cookeville	Tennessee	Active	
728	Omicron Chi	February 12, 1982	Wofford College	Spartanburg	South Carolina	Active	
737	Pi Theta	March 27, 1982	Coppin State University	Baltimore	Maryland	Active	
729 ?	**Omicron Psi**	1983	Delta State University	Cleveland	Mississippi	Active	
	Omicron Omega					Unassigned	
730	**Pi Alpha**	February 23, 1983	Clemson University	Clemson	South Carolina	Active	
731	**Pi Beta**	September 10, 1983	Binghamton University	Binghamton	New York	Active	
732 ?	**Pi Gamma**	July 7, 1983	California State University, Sacramento	Sacramento	California	Active	
733 ?	**Pi Delta**	November 12, 1983	University of West Alabama	Livingston	Alabama	Active	
734 ?	Pi Epsilon	1983–xxxx ?	California State University, Chico	Chico	California	Inactive	
735 ?	**Pi Zeta**	October 7, 1984	University of North Carolina at Greensboro	Greensboro	North Carolina	Active	
736?	Pi Eta	198x ?–xxxx ?	New Mexico State University	Las Cruces	New Mexico	Inactive	
738 ?	Pi Iota	July 30, 1985 – 1991	Eureka College	Eureka	Illinois	Inactive	(Note: Chapter went inactive in 1991 due to lack of members. It was de-chartered in 1995.)
739 ?	**Pi Kappa**	1984	California State University, Northridge	Los Angeles	California	Active	
740 ?	**Pi Mu**	1985	West Virginia University	Morgantown	West Virginia	Active	
741 ?	**Pi Nu**	January 17, 1985	Appalachian State University	Boone	North Carolina	Active	
742	**Pi Xi**	1985	Stockton University	Galloway Township	New Jersey	Active	
743 ?	**Pi Omicron**	1985	Texas A&M University	College Station	Texas	Active	
744	**Pi Pi**	May 29, 1985	Union College	Schenectady	New York	Active	
745	**Pi Rho** (see Rho)	September 16, 1985	Temple University	Philadelphia	Pennsylvania	Active	(Note: Temple University was originally part of the citywide Rho chapter.)
746 ?	Pi Sigma	May 23, 1985 – xxxx ?	Aurora University	Aurora	Illinois	Inactive	
747 ?	Pi Tau	198x ?–xxxx ?	LaGrange College	LaGrange	Georgia	Inactive	
748 ?	**Pi Upsilon**	1986	University of Michigan–Dearborn, University of Detroit Mercy, and Marygrove College	Dearborn	Michigan	Active	
749 ?	**Pi Phi**	1985	Wright State University	Dayton	Ohio	Active	
750 ?	Pi Chi	198x ?–xxxx ?	Eastern New Mexico University	Portales	New Mexico	Inactive	
751 ?	**Pi Psi**	198x ?	University of Arkansas at Monticello	Monticello	Arkansas	Active	
491	**Xi Zeta**	April 5, 1986	Longwood University	Farmville	Virginia	Active	
752	**Rho Alpha**	September 1, 1987	SUNY Brockport	Brockport	New York	Active	
753	Rho Beta (First)	1987-2001	California State University, Bakersfield	Bakersfield	California	Inactive, Reassigned	
754 ?	**Rho Gamma**	1988	Northern Kentucky University	Highland Heights	Kentucky	Active	
755 ?	**Rho Delta**	1988	Central Michigan University, Northwood University, Saginaw Valley State University	Mount Pleasant	Michigan	Active	
756	**Rho Epsilon**	1988	Loyola University New Orleans	New Orleans	Louisiana	Active	
757 ?	Rho Zeta	198x ? – xxxx ?	Lander University	Greenwood	South Carolina	Inactive	
758	**Rho Eta**	1988	Eastern Kentucky University	Richmond	Kentucky	Active	
759 ?	**Rho Theta**	March 26, 1988	Northwest Missouri State University	Maryville	Missouri	Active	
760 ?	**Rho Iota**	1989	Tulane University	New Orleans	Louisiana	Active	
761	**Rho Kappa**	August 1, 1989	State University of New York at Old Westbury	Old Westbury	New York	Active	
762	**Rho Mu** (see Kappa Sigma)	1989	West Texas A&M University	Canyon	Texas	Active	(Note: The original chapter at Western Texas was Kappa Sigma.)
763	**Rho Nu** (see Alpha Eta)	1989	Massachusetts Institute of Technology and Harvard University	Cambridge	Massachusetts	Active	(Note: The original chapter at Harvard was Alpha Eta. Rho Nu was originally chartered as a citywide chapter that included Babson College, Harvard University, Massachusetts Institute of Technology, and Tufts University.)
764 ?	**Rho Xi**	November 11, 1989	Saint Leo University	St. Leo	Florida	Active	
	Sigma Beta	1989–xxxx ?	East Tennessee State University	Johnson City	Tennessee	Inactive	
765	**Rho Omicron**	August 7, 1990	United States Military Academy	West Point	New York	Active	
766	**Rho Pi** (see Xi Mu)	August 1990	PennWest Edinboro and Slippery Rock University	Edinboro	Pennsylvania	Active	(Note: Chapter formed at Edinboro University but is now a citywide chapter that includes the former Xi Mu chapter.)
767	**Rho Rho**	August 7, 1990	Stony Brook University	Stony Brook	New York	Active	
768	**Rho Sigma**	August 7, 1990	University at Albany, SUNY	Albany	New York	Active	
	Rho Tau First	August 7, 1990 – xxxx ?	Virginia Wesleyan University	Norfolk	Virginia	Inactive, Reassigned	
790	**Rho Upsilon**	1990	Denison University	Granville	Ohio	Active	
788	Rho Phi	199x ?–xxxx ?	Mississippi University for Women	Columbus	Mississippi	Inactive	
	**Rho Chi**	August 7, 1990	University of Alabama in Huntsville	Huntsville	Alabama	Active	
	**Rho Psi**	199x ?	Texas A&M University–Corpus Christi	Corpus Christi	Texas	Active	
792	Sigma Alpha	199x ?–xxxx ?	University of California, Santa Cruz	Santa Cruz	California	Inactive	
	Sigma Epsilon	1990–xxxx ?	Tarleton State University	Stephenville	Texas	Inactive	
	**Sigma Gamma**	1991	Xavier University	Cincinnati	Ohio	Active	
	**Sigma Delta**	September 29, 1991	Elon University	Elon	North Carolina	Active	
779	**Sigma Zeta**	1991	Wesleyan University	Middletown	Connecticut	Active	
780	**Sigma Eta**	October 12, 1991	State University of New York at New Paltz	New Paltz	New York	Active	
781 ?	**Sigma Theta**	1991	Missouri State University	Springfield	Missouri	Active	
782 ?	Sigma Iota (see Delta)	1991–xxxx ?	University of Toronto	Toronto	Ontario, Canada	Inactive	(Note: The first chapter at the University of Toronto was Delta.)
783 ?	**Sigma Kappa**	1991	Missouri Western State University	St. Joseph	Missouri	Active	
784	**Sigma Mu**	October 12, 1991	Adelphi University	Garden City	New York	Active	
785	**Sigma Nu**	1991	Ramapo College and William Paterson University	Mahwah	New Jersey	Active	
786 ?	Sigma Xi	1991–xxxx ?	Monmouth University	West Long Branch	New Jersey	Inactive	
787	**Sigma Omicron**	November 6, 1991	State University of New York at Oswego	Oswego	New York	Active	
789 ?	Sigma Rho	199x ?				Inactive	
790	**Sigma Sigma**	December 4, 1991	Johns Hopkins University	Baltimore	Maryland	Active	
788	**Sigma Pi**	1992	University of Lynchburg	Lynchburg	Virginia	Active	
793	**Sigma Phi**	April 12, 1992	Indiana University Indianapolis, Purdue University in Indianapolis, Butler University, Marian University, and University of Indianapolis	Indianapolis	Indiana	Active	
791	**Sigma Tau**	February 28, 1993	University of South Carolina Aiken	Aiken	South Carolina	Active	
792	**Sigma Upsilon**	August 27, 1993	University of North Florida	Jacksonville	Florida	Active	
794 ?	Sigma Chi	May 31, 1992	Newberry College	Newberry	South Carolina	Inactive	
795 ?	Sigma Psi	1993–xxxx ?	University of Nevada, Las Vegas	Paradise	Nevada	Inactive	
	Sigma Omega					Unassigned	
796	**Tau Alpha**	October 17, 1993	Baylor University	Waco	Texas	Active	
	**Tau Beta**	199x ?	Louisiana State University Shreveport	Shreveport	Louisiana	Active	
	Tau Gamma	1996–xxxx ?	Embry–Riddle Aeronautical University	Daytona Beach	Florida	Inactive	
	Xi Chi	1997–xxxx ?	Wittenberg University	Springfield	Ohio	Inactive	
799	**Tau Delta**	1998	Florida International University	Miami	Florida	Active	
901	**Tau Zeta**	199x ?-19xx ?; 2009	Kennesaw State University	Cobb County	Georgia	Active	(Note: Chapter was housed at Southern Polytechnic State University from November 17, 2001 until 2009.)
	**Tau Eta**	1999	College of Charleston	Charleston	South Carolina	Active	
	Tau Theta	1999–20xx ?	Stetson University	DeLand	Florida	Inactive	
	**Tau Iota**	August 5, 2000	Samford University	Homewood	Alabama	Active	
	**Tau Kappa** (see Omicron Mu)	August 19, 2000	Oakland University	Oakland County	Michigan	Active	(Note: The original chapter at Oakland University was Omicron Mu.)
	Tau Mu	20xx ?–20xx ?	University of Houston–Downtown	Houston	Texas	Inactive	
	**Tau Nu**	January 23, 2001	University of North Carolina at Pembroke	Pembroke	North Carolina	Active	
753	Rho Beta (Second)	April 21, 2001 – 2013	University of Alaska Anchorage	Anchorage	Alaska	Inactive, Reassigned	
	**Tau Epsilon**	April 23, 2002	Clayton State University	Morrow	Georgia	Active	(Note: Chapter was formed on January 23, 1999.)
	**Tau Pi**	November 1, 2003	University of Tampa	Tampa	Florida	Active	
	**Tau Xi**	2003	University of Texas at Dallas	Richardson	Texas	Active	
	**Tau Omicron**	November 1, 2003	Davidson College	Davidson	North Carolina	Active	
912 ?	**Tau Sigma** (see Omicron Delta)	November 22, 2003	University of New Mexico	Albuquerque	New Mexico	Active	
913 ?	Tau Tau	200x ?–20xx ?	Texas Lutheran University	Seguin	Texas	Inactive	
	Rho Tau Second (see Nu Pi)	March 9, 2004 – 200x ?	University of Evansville and University of Southern Indiana	Evansville	Indiana	Inactive, Reassigned	(Note: The Nu Pi chapter of the University of Evansville merged to form this chapter. The chapter was reseated at DePauw University in Greencastle in April 2005.)
911	**Tau Rho**	April 18, 2004	University of North Georgia	Dahlonega	Georgia	Active	
	**Rho Tau Third**	April 7, 2005 – 200x ?; March 9, 2017	DePauw University	Greencastle	Indiana	Active	
914	**Tau Upsilon**	April 9, 2005	Purdue University Northwest	Hammond	Indiana	Active	
915	**Tau Phi**	20xx ?	Austin Peay State University	Clarksville	Tennessee	Active	
916 ?	Tau Chi	2008–20xx ?	University of West Georgia	Carrollton	Georgia	Inactive	
917	**Tau Psi**	20xx ?	University of Tennessee at Martin	Martin	Tennessee	Active	
	Tau Omega					Unassigned	
918 ?	**Upsilon Alpha**	February 8, 2009	University of South Carolina Upstate	Valley Falls	South Carolina	Active	
919	**Upsilon Beta**	August 18, 2009	Christopher Newport University	Newport News	Virginia	Active	
920	**Upsilon Gamma**	2009	University of Richmond	Richmond	Virginia	Active	
921 ?	Upsilon Delta	2010–20xx ?	Rust College	Holly Springs	Mississippi	Inactive	
922 ?	**Upsilon Eta**	June 5, 2011	Auburn University at Montgomery	Montgomery	Alabama	Active	
923	**Upsilon Epsilon**	June 25, 2011	Salisbury University	Salisbury	Maryland	Active	
	**Upsilon Theta**	June 25, 2011	Florida Atlantic University	Boca Raton	Florida	Active	
927	**Upsilon Iota**	June 25, 2011	Chowan University	Murfreesboro	North Carolina	Active	
928	**Upsilon Kappa**	January 30, 2012	State University of New York at Plattsburgh	Plattsburgh	New York	Active	
	Upsilon Mu (see Iota Omicron)	April 15, 2012 – xxxx ?	Southern Methodist University	Dallas	Texas	Inactive, Reestablished	(Note: The prior chapter on this campus was called Iota Omicron.)
	Upsilon Nu	2013–xxxx ?	Lehigh University	Bethlehem	Pennsylvania	Inactive	
	**Upsilon Xi**	February 11, 2013	University of Illinois Springfield	Springfield, Illinois	Illinois	Active	
753	**Rho Beta (Third)**	February 16, 2013	Portland State University, Oregon State University, and University of Oregon	Portland	Oregon	Active	
935	**Upsilon Omicron**	June 10, 2014	Oglethorpe University	Brookhaven	Georgia	Active	
937	Upsilon Pi	June 10, 2014 – xxxx ?	Hobart and William Smith Colleges	Geneva	New York	Inactive	
938	**Upsilon Rho**	August 23, 2014	University of San Francisco	San Francisco	California	Active	
	**Upsilon Sigma**	August 5, 2015	Florida Gulf Coast University	Fort Myers	Florida	Active	
	**Upsilon Zeta**	February 28, 2016	University of Maryland, Baltimore County	Baltimore County	Maryland	Inactive	
	Upsilon Tau	2016–20xx ?	Belmont University	Nashville	Tennessee	Inactive	
942	**Upsilon Upsilon**	May 24, 2016	New York University	New York City	New York	Active	
	Upsilon Phi	July 22, 2016			Tennessee	Inactive	
945	**Upsilon Chi**	February 17, 2017	Pepperdine University	Malibu	California	Active	
946	**Upsilon Psi**	February 17, 2017	Middle Georgia College	Macon	Georgia	Active	
947	**Phi Alpha**	July 14, 2017	Virginia Wesleyan University	Virginia Beach	Virginia	Active	
	Phi Beta	July 14, 2017				Active	
949	**Phi Gamma**	July 14, 2017	Methodist University	Fayetteville	North Carolina	Active	
	**Phi Delta**	July 14, 2017	Johnson & Wales University Charlotte Campus	Charlotte	North Carolina	Active	
951	**Phi Epsilon**	October 2, 2017	University of Southern Indiana	Evansville Indiana	Indiana	Active	
953	**Phi Zeta**	October 2, 2018	Radford University	Radford	Virginia	Active	
954	**Phi Eta**	October 1, 2018	Seton Hall University	South Orange	New Jersey	Active	
955	**Phi Theta**	January 12, 2019	Stevens Institute of Technology	Hoboken	New Jersey	Active	
956	**Phi Iota**	May 15, 2019	McDaniel College	Westminster	Maryland	Active	
957	**Phi Kappa**	March 16, 2019	Iona University	New Rochelle	New York	Active	
964	**Phi Mu**	October 26, 2019	University of The Bahamas	Nassau	The Bahamas	Active	
	Phi Nu	20xx ?				Inactive ?	
966	**Phi Xi**	July 26, 2020	Georgia Gwinnett College	Lawrenceville	Georgia	Active	
979	**Phi Omicron**	July 17, 2021	Buffalo State University	Buffalo	New York	Active	

== Alumni chapters ==
Following is a list of Alpha Phi Alpha alumni chapters. Active chapters are indicated in bold; inactive chapters are in italics.

Key no.	Chapter	Charter date and range	City or county	State, territory, or country	Status	Ref.
	Alpha Alumni	November 19, 1912	New York City	New York	Inactive	
101	**Alpha Lambda**	April 11, 1911	Louisville	Kentucky	Active	
16	**Rho**	November 3, 1914	Philadelphia	Pennsylvania	Active	(Note: This chapter formeded as the Philadelphia Citywide chapter. However, the collegiate side of the chapter merged with other collegiate chapters, leaving Rho Alumni chapter.)
102	**Beta Lambda**	January 19, 1919	Kansas City	Missouri	Active	
103	**Gamma Lambda**	March 22, 1919	Detroit	Michigan	Active	
104	**Delta Lambda**	May 23, 1919	Baltimore	Maryland	Active	
105	**Epsilon Lambda**	December 3, 1919	St. Louis	Missouri	Active	
106	**Zeta Lambda**	April 3, 1920	Newport News	Virginia	Active	
107	**Eta Lambda**	May 20, 1920	Atlanta	Georgia	Active	(Note: This chapter was chartered as a mixed chapter, serving both graduate and undergraduates from Atlanta University and Morehouse College. In 1924, Alpha Rho was created for the undergraduates at Morehouse.)
108	**Theta Lambda**	December 23, 1921	Dayton	Ohio	Active	
109	**Iota Lambda**	April 17, 1922	Indianapolis	Indiana	Active	
110	**Kappa Lambda**	June 9, 1923	Greensboro	North Carolina	Active	
	Lambda Lambda				Unassigned	
111	**Mu Lambda**	October 1, 1923	Washington	D.C.	Active	
112	**Nu Lambda**	December 18, 1923	Petersburg	Virginia	Active	
113	**Xi Lambda**	May 15, 1924	Chicago	Illinois	Active	
114	**Omicron Lambda**	February 14, 1924	Birmingham	Alabama	Active	
115	**Pi Lambda**	May 3, 1926	Little Rock	Arkansas	Active	
116	**Rho Lambda**	March 28, 1925	Buffalo	New York	Active	
117	**Sigma Lambda**	December 5, 1925	New Orleans	Louisiana	Active	
118	**Tau Lambda**	May 30, 1925	Nashville	Tennessee	Active	
119	**Upsilon Lambda**	December 30, 1925	Jacksonville	Florida	Active	
120	**Phi Lambda**	December 19, 1926	Raleigh	North Carolina	Active	
121	**Chi Lambda**	May 23, 1926	Wilberforce	Ohio	Active	
122	**Psi Lambda**	May 15, 1926	Chattanooga	Tennessee	Active	
	Omega Lambda				Unassigned	
123	**Alpha Alpha Lambda**	October 13, 1926	Newark	New Jersey	Active	
124	**Alpha Beta Lambda**	June 9, 1928	Lexington	Kentucky	Active	
125	Alpha Gamma Lambda	December 23, 1926	Harlem	New York	Active	
	**Alpha Delta Lambda**	June 5, 1930	Memphis	Tennessee	Active	
129	**Alpha Epsilon Lambda**	June 10, 1927	Jackson	Mississippi	Active	
128	Alpha Zeta Lamba (First)	January 28, 1927 – 20xx ?	Bluefield	West Virginia	Moved	
	**Alpha Eta Lambda**	November 27, 1927	Houston	Texas	Active	(Note: Chapter was formed in Prairie View, with meetings rotating between Prairie View and Houston. After the establishment of Epsilon Tau Lambda chapter in 1952 in Hempstead, near Prairie View, Alpha Eta Lambda relocated to Houston.)
130	**Alpha Theta Lambda**	January 9, 1927	Atlantic City	New Jersey	Active	
131	**Alpha Iota Lambda**	January 9, 1928	Charleston	West Virginia	Active	
132	**Alpha Kappa Lambda**	January 9, 1928	Roanoke	Virginia	Active	
	Alpha Lambda Lambda				Unassigned	
133	**Alpha Mu Lambda**	May 4, 1930	Knoxville	Tennessee	Active	
134	**Alpha Nu Lambda**	November 3, 1928	Tuskegee	Alabama	Active	
135	**Alpha Xi Lambda**	November 3, 1928	Toledo	Ohio	Active	
247	**Alpha Omicron Lambda**	April 5, 1928	Pittsburgh	Pennsylvania	Active	
137	**Alpha Pi Lambda**	June 1, 1931	Winston-Salem	North Carolina	Active	
138	**Alpha Rho Lambda**	December 21, 1929 – 193x ?; October 1937	Columbus	Ohio	Active	
139 ?	**Alpha Sigma Lambda**	November 5, 1932	Dallas	Texas	Active	
140	**Alpha Tau Lambda**	March 17, 1934	Tulsa	Oklahoma	Active	
141	**Alpha Upsilon Lambda**	December 29, 1932	Montgomery	Alabama	Active	
142	**Alpha Phi Lambda**	May 7, 1935	Norfolk and Virginia Beach	Virginia	Active	
143	**Alpha Chi Lambda**	April 27, 1935	Augusta	Georgia	Active	
144	**Alpha Psi Lambda**	May 7, 1935	Columbia	South Carolina	Active	
	Alpha Omega Lamba				Unassigned	
145	Beta Alpha Lambda First (see **Sigma Chi Alpha**)	193x ?–xxxx ?	Jersey City	New Jersey	Inactive, Reassigned	(Note: Chapter was re-established as Sigma Alpha Lambda.)
145	**Beta Alpha Lambda**	June 27, 1999	Baltimore County	Maryland	Active	
146	**Beta Beta Lambda**	November 19, 1937	Greater Miami	Florida	Active	
147	**Beta Gamma Lambda**	May 4, 1935	Richmond	Virginia	Active	
148	**Beta Delta Lamba**	December 27, 1937	Daytona Beach	Florida	Active	
149	**Beta Epsilon Lambda**	December 23, 1937	Boley	Oklahoma	Active	
150	**Beta Zeta Lambda**	March 31, 1938	Jefferson City	Missouri	Active	
151	**Beta Eta Lambda**	January 1, 1938	Oklahoma City	Oklahoma	Active	
152	**Beta Theta Lambda**	May 7, 1938	Durham	North Carolina	Active	
153 ?	**Beta Iota Lambda**	193x ?	Baton Rouge	Louisiana	Active	
154	**Beta Kappa Lambda**	193x ?	Charleston	South Carolina	Active	
	Beta Lambda Lambda				Unassigned	
155	**Beta Mu Lambda**	August 21, 1931	Salisbury	North Carolina	Active	
156	**Beta Nu Lambda**	August 1, 1931	Charlotte	North Carolina	Active	
157	**Beta Xi Lambda**	193x ?	Omaha	Nebraska	Active	
158	**Beta Omicron Lambda**	July 29, 1939	Mobile	Alabama	Active	
159	**Beta Pi Lambda**	July 1, 1939	Albany	New York	Active	
160	Beta Rho Lambda	19xx ?–xxxx ?	Youngstown	Ohio	Inactive	
161	**Beta Sigma Lambda**	19xx ?	Hartford	Connecticut	Active	
152 ?	**Beta Tau Lambda**	19xx ?	Fort Worth	Texas	Active	
163	**Beta Upsilon Lambda**	1941	Jackson	Tennessee	Active	
164	**Beta Phi Lambda**	194x ?	Savannah	Georgia	Active	
165	**Beta Chi Lambda**	194x ?	Muskogee	Oklahoma	Active	
166 ?	**Beta Psi Lambda**	December 14, 1940	Los Angeles	California	Active	
	Beta Omega Lambda				Unassigned	
167	**Gamma Alpha Lambda**	194x ?	Charlottesville	Virginia	Active	
168	Gamma Beta Lambda	194x ?–xxxx ?	Frankfort	Kentucky	Inactive	
169	**Gamma Gamma Lambda**	August 24, 1941	Greenville	South Carolina	Active	
170	Gamma Delta Lambda	194x ?–19xx ?	Beckley	West Virginia	Inactive	
171	Gamma Epsilon Lambda	194x ?–xxxx ?	Hoplinsville	Kentucky	Inactive	
172	**Gamma Zeta Lambda**	March 21, 1945	Tampa	Florida	Active	
173 ?	**Gamma Eta Lambda**	September 14, 1945	Austin	Texas	Active	
174	**Gamma Theta Lambda**	August 1945	Wilmington	Delaware	Active	
175	**Gamma Iota Lambda**	May 5, 1945	Brooklyn	New York	Active	
176	**Gamma Kappa Lambda**	January 1, 1945	Wilmington	North Carolina	Active	
	Gamma Lambda Lambda				Unassigned	
177	**Gamma Mu Lambda**	1946	Tallahassee	Florida	Active	
178	**Gamma Nu Lambda**	194x ?	Lynchburg	Virginia	Active	
179	**Gamma Xi Lambda**	194x ?	Minneapolis	Minnesota	Active	
180	**Gamma Omicron Lambda**	1948	Albany	Georgia	Active	
181 ?	**Gamma Pi Lambda**	January 1947	Galveston	Texas	Active	
182	**Gamma Rho Lambda**	February 8, 1947	Gary	Indiana	Active	
183	**Gamma Sigma Lambda**	194x ?	Fort Valley	Georgia	Active	
184 ?	**Gamma Tau Lambda**	1947	Beaumont	Texas	Active	
185 ?	Gamma Upsilon Lambda	194x ?–xxxx ?			Inactive	
186 ?	**Gamma Phi Lambda**	April 12, 1947	Berkeley	California	Active	
187 ?	**Gamma Chi Lambda**	September 20, 1947	San Francisco	California	Active	
188	Gamma Psi Lambda	194x ?–xxxx ?	Asheville	North Carolina	Inactive	
	Gamma Omega Lambda				Unassigned	
189	**Delta Alpha Lambda**	November 15, 1947	Cleveland	Ohio	Active	
190	**Delta Beta Lambda**	1947	Hampton	Virginia	Active	
191	**Delta Gamma Lambda**	December 20, 1947	Cincinnati	Ohio	Active	
192	**Delta Delta Lambda**	January 1, 1947	West Palm Beach	Florida	Active	
193	**Delta Epsilon Lambda**	December 14, 1947	East St. Louis	Illinois	Active	
194	**Delta Zeta Lambda**	1948	Orangeburg	South Carolina	Active	
195	**Delta Eta Lambda**	April 6, 1948	Topeka	Kansas	Active	
196	**Delta Theta Lambda**	April 13, 1948	Huntsville	Alabama	Active	
197	**Delta Iota Lambda**	19xx ?	Columbus	Georgia	Active	
198	**Delta Kappa Lambda**	19xx ?	Florence	South Carolina	Active	
	Delta Lambda Lambda				Unassign ed	
199	**Delta Mu Lambda**	19xx ?	Paterson	New Jersey	Active	(Note: Chapter was originally seated in Montclair, New Jersey.)
200	**Delta Nu Lambda**	19xx ?	Danville	Virginia	Active	
202	**Delta Xi Lambda**	December 22, 1953	Orlando	Florida	Active	
203	Delta Omicron Lambda	19xx ?–xxxx ?	Princess Anne	Maryland	Inactive	
204	**Delta Pi Lambda**	September 12, 1948	Selma	Alabama	Active	
205	**Delta Rho Lambda**	September 3, 1949	San Antonio	Texas	Active	
206	**Delta Sigma Lambda**	194x ?	Pine Bluff	Arkansas	Active	
207	**Delta Tau Lambda**	December 3, 1949	Phoenix	Arizona	Active	
208	**Delta Upsilon Lambda**	194x ?	Shreveport	Louisiana	Active	
209	**Delta Phi Lambda**	February 15, 1949	Tuscaloosa	Alabama	Active	
210	**Delta Chi Lambda**	194x ?	Milwaukee	Wisconsin	Active	
211 ?	**Delta Psi Lambda**	May 21, 1949	Denver	Colorado	Active	
	Delta Omega Lambda				Unassigned	
500	**Omicron Lambda Alpha**	April 27, 1952	Washington	D.C.	Active	(Note: Chapter was chartered as an intermediate chapter for brothers who had graduated from college but were not ready to join an alumni chapter. It became a regular alumni chapter in 1975 when intermediate chapters were abolished.)
501	Omicron Lambda Beta	January 24, 1954 – 1964; 196x–197x; 1994–1999	Champaign	Illinois	Inactive	
212 ?	**Epsilon Alpha Lamba**	19xx ?	Conway	Arkansas	Active	
213	**Epsilon Beta Lamba**	19xx ?	Macon	Georgia	Active	
214	**Epsilon Gamma Lambda**	19xx ?	Boston	Massachusetts	Active	
215	**Epsilon Delta Lambda**	January 1, 1949	Calhoun County and Talladega County	Alabama	Active	
216 ?	**Epsilon Epsilon Lambda**	19xx ?	Waco	Texas	Active	
217 ?	**Epsilon Zeta Lambda**	19xx ?	Portland	Oregon	Active	
218	Epsilon Eta Lambda	19xx ?–xxxx ?	Charleston	Missouri	Inactive	
219	**Epsilon Theta Lambda**	19xx ?	Hamilton	Bermuda	Active	
220	**Epsilon Iota Lambda**	19xx ?	Suffolk	Virginia	Active	
221	**Epsilon Kappa Lambda**	19xx ?	Grambling	Louisiana	Active	
	Epsilon Lambda Lambda				Unassigned	
222	**Epsilon Mu Lambda**	19xx ?	Pensacola	Florida	Active	
223	**Epsilon Nu Lambda**	19xx ?	Portsmouth	Virginia	Active	
224 ?	**Epsilon Xi Lambda**	1951	Mound Bayou	Mississippi	Active	
225	**Epsilon Omicron Lambda**	195x ?	Lawrenceville	Virginia	Active	
226 ?	**Epsilon Pi Lambda**	March 30, 1952	Ocala	Florida	Active	
227 ?	**Epsilon Rho Lambda**	January 1, 1952	Fayetteville	North Carolina	Active	
228 ?	**Epsilon Sigma Lambda**	February 15, 1977	Rocky Mount	North Carolina	Active	
229 ?	**Epsilon Tau Lambda**	November 7, 1952	Prairie View	Texas	Active	(Note: Chapter originally was organized in Hempstead, Texas and later moved to Prairie View.)
230	**Epsilon Upsilon Lambda**	1953	Flint	Michigan	Active	
231 ?	**Epsilon Phi Lambda**	195x ?	Port Arthur	Texas	Active	
232 ?	**Epsilon Chi Lambda**	December 7, 1953	Elizabeth City	North Carolina	Active	
233	**Epsilon Psi Lambda**	January 1, 1954	Alexandria	Louisiana	Active	
	Epsilon Omega Lambda				Unassigned	
234	**Zeta Alpha Lambda**	1954	Fort Lauderdale	Florida	Active	
235 ?	**Zeta Beta Lambda**	195x ?	Sacramento	California	Active	
236	**Zeta Gamma Lambda**	195x ?	Langston	Oklahoma	Active	
237	**Zeta Delta Lambda**	195x ?	Springfield	Ohio	Active	
238	**Zeta Epsilon Lambda**	195x ?	Red Bank	New Jersey	Active	
240 ?	**Zeta Eta Lambda**	January 1, 1955	Greenville	North Carolina	Active	
239	**Zeta Zeta Lambda**	April 24, 1955	St. Albans, Queens	New York	Active	
241	**Zeta Theta Lambda**	195x ?	Harrisburg	Pennsylvania	Active	
242	**Zeta Iota Lambda**	195x ?	Trenton	New Jersey	Active	
243	**Zeta Kappa Lambda**	195x ?	Des Moines	Iowa	Active	
	Zeta Lambda Lambda				Unassigned	
244 ?	**Zeta Mu Lambda**	1956	Biloxi	Mississippi	Active	
245	**Zeta Nu Lambda**	195x ?	Plainfield	New Jersey	Active	
246	Zeta Xi Lambda First	January 18, 1954 – 19xx ?	Evanston	Illinois	Inactive, Reassigned	(Note: Chapter was re-chartered in Champaign, Illinois in 2004.)
246	**Zeta Xi Lambda**	September 1, 2004	Champaign	Illinois	Active	(Note: Zeta Xi Lambda was originally chartered in Evanston, Illinois but went inactive.)
247	**Zeta Omicron Lambda**	195x ?	Philadelphia	Pennsylvania	Active	
248 :	**Zeta Pi Lambda**	195x ?	Seattle	Washington	Active	
249	**Zeta Rho Lambda**	November 6, 1956	Dover	Delaware	Active	
250 ?	**Zeta Sigma Lambda**	January 22, 1957	San Diego	California	Active	
251 ?	Zeta Tau Lambda First	19xx ?–xxxx ?	Amarillo	Texas	Inactive, Reassigned	
251 ?	**Zeta Tau Lambda**	August 24, 2004	South Houston and Southeast Houston	Texas	Active	
252	**Zeta Upsilon Lambda**	December 12, 1975	Reston, Fairfax County, and Loudoun County	Virginia	Active	
253	**Zeta Phi Lambda**	April 21, 1957	Stamford	Connecticut	Active	
255 ?	Zeta Chi Lambda	195x ?–xxxx ?			Inactive	
254	**Zeta Psi Lambda**	October 4, 1957	Lake Charles	Louisiana	Active	
	Zeta Omega Lambda				Unassigned	
256	**Eta Alpha Lambda**	June 25, 1957	New Haven	Connecticut	Active	
257	**Eta Beta Lambda**	195x ?	Wichita	Kansas	Active	
258	Eta Gamma Lambda	195x ?–xxxx ?	Lafayette	Louisiana	Inactive	
259 ?	**Eta Delta Lambda**	195x ?	Monroe	Louisiana	Active	
262	**Eta Eta Lambda**	April 15, 1959	Annapolis	Maryland	Active	
261	**Eta Zeta Lambda**	November 2, 1958	Westchester County	New York	Active	
260	**Eta Epsilon Lambda**	October 6, 1958	Monrovia	Liberia	Active	
263	**Eta Theta Lambda**	June 13, 1959	Wyandanch	New York	Active	
264	**Eta Iota Lambda**	December 8, 1959	Athens	Georgia	Active	
265	**Eta Kappa Lambda**	March 24, 1960	Fort Pierce	Florida	Active	
	Eta Lambda Lambda				Unassigned	
266	**Eta Mu Lambda**	January 1, 1960	Gastonia	North Carolina	Active	
267	**Eta Nu Lambda**	March 25, 1960	Grand Rapids	Michigan	Active	
268	**Eta Xi Lambda**	196x ?	Lawton	Oklahoma	Active	
269	**Eta Omicron Lambda**	August 26, 1960	Rock Hill	South Carolina	Active	
270 ?	**Eta Pi Lambda**	April 16, 1960	Pasadena	California	Active	
271	**Eta Rho Lambda**	October 2, 1960	Rochester	New York	Active	
272 ?	**Eta Sigma Lambda**	July 8, 1960	San Jose	California	Active	(Note: This chapter was originally established in Palo Alto, California, but moved to San Jose in the mid-1980s.)
273	**Eta Tau Lambda**	August 23, 1960	Akron	Ohio	Active	
274 ?	Eta Upsilon Lambda First	196x ?–xxxx ?	Odessa	Texas	Inactive, Reassigned	(Note: Chapter name was reassigned to a group in Monticello, Arkansas in 2015.)
274 ?	**Eta Upsilon Lambda**	August 4, 2015	Monticello	Arkansas	Active	
275	**Eta Phi Lambda**	1961	Columbus	Mississippi	Active	
276	**Eta Chi Lambda**	October 17, 1961	Rockland County	New York	Active	
277 ?	**Eta Psi Lambda**	196x ?	Tucson	Arizona	Active	
279 ?	Eta Omega Lambda				Unassigned	
278	**Theta Alpha Lamba**	January 1, 1962	Gadsden	Alabama	Active	
280	Theta Gamma Lambda	196x ?–xxxx ?	Dothan	Alabama	Inactive	
281 ?	**Theta Delta Lambda**	196x ?	El Paso	Texas	Active	
282	**Theta Epsilon Lambda**	196x ?	Saint Thomas	U.S. Virgin Islands	Active	
283	**Theta Zeta Lambda**	January 23, 1962	Ann Arbor	Michigan	Active	
284	**Theta Eta Lambda**	December 31, 1962	St. Petersburg	Florida	Active	
285	**Theta Theta Lambda**	196x ?	Frankfurt	Germany	Active	
286	**Theta Iota Lambda**	196x ?	Springfield	Massachusetts	Active	
287 ?	Theta Kappa Lambda	196x ?–xxxx ?			Inactive	
	Theta Lambda Lambda				Unassigned	
288	Theta Mu Lambda First	December 12, 1963 – 196x ?	Calumet City	Illinois	Inactive, Reassigned	(Note: Chapter name was reassigned to University Park, Illinois in 1986.)
288	**Theta Mu Lambda**	December 2, 1986	Joliet	Illinois	Active	(Note: Chapter name was originally chartered in Calumet City, Illinois but went dormant in the 1960s.)
289	**Theta Nu Lambda**	196x ?	La Grange	Georgia	Active	
290	**Theta Xi Lambda**	1965–19xx ?, xxxx ?	South Bend	Indiana	Active	
291	**Theta Omicron Lambda**	January 1, 1964	Goldsboro	North Carolina	Active	
292 ?	**Theta Pi Lambda**	196x ?	Las Vegas	Nevada	Active	
293	**Theta Rho Lambda**	196x ?	Arlington County and Alexandria	Virginia	Active	
294	**Theta Sigma Lambda**	1965	Natchez	Mississippi	Active	
295 ?	**Theta Tau Lambda**	196x ?	Helena	Arkansas	Active	
296	**Theta Upsilon Lambda**	January 6, 1966	Fort Wayne	Indiana	Active	
297	**Theta Phi Lambda**	196x ?	Bennettsville	South Carolina	Active	
298	Theta Chi Lambda	196x ?–xxxx ?	Schenectady	New York	Inactive	
299	**Theta Psi Lambda**	196x ?	Somerset	New Jersey	Active	
	Theta Omega Lambda	196x ?–xxxx ?			Unassigned	
502	**Iota Alpha Lambda**	November 11, 1966	Aberdeen	Maryland	Active	
503	**Iota Beta Lambda**	1966	Cocoa	Florida	Active	
504	Iota Gamma Lambda	196x ?–xxxx ?			Inactive	
505	**Iota Delta Lambda**	May 1, 1968 – 197x ?; 1980	Chicago	Illinois	Active	
506	Iota Epsilon Lambda First	196x ?–xxxx ?	Saigon and Long Binh Post	South Vietnam	Inactive, Reassigned	
506	**Iota Epsilon Lambda**		Nassau	The Bahamas	Active	
	**Iota Zeta Lambda**	196x ?	Compton and Los Angeles	California	Active	
508	**Iota Eta Lambda**	196x ?	Denmark	South Carolina	Active	
509	**Iota Theta Lambda**	1968	Endicott	New York	Active	
510	**Iota Iota Lambda**	January 10, 1969	Ithaca	New York	Active	(Note: Chapter was originally chartered in Rome, New York but relocated to Ithaca.)
511	**Iota Kappa Lambda**	April 22, 1969	Syracuse	New York	Active	
	Iota Lambda Lambda				Unassigned	
	**Iota Mu Lambda**	19xx ?	Tacoma	Washington	Active	
	**Iota Nu Lambda**	September 1, 1970	Fresno	California	Active	
	**Iota Xi Lambda**	19xx ?	Opelousas	Louisiana	Active	
	**Iota Omicron Lambda**	19xx ?	Colorado Springs	Colorado	Active	
516	**Iota Pi Lambda**	December 22, 1969	Richmond Heights and Miami	Florida	Active	
517	**Iota Rho Lambda**	September 2, 1970	Pontiac	Michigan	Active	
518	**Iota Sigma Lambda**	197x ?	Saint Croix	U.S. Virgin Islands	Active	
519	Iota Tau Lambda	197x ?–xxxx ?	Charlotte Court House	Virginia	Inactive	
520	**Iota Upsilon Lambda**	197x ?	Silver Spring	Maryland	Active	
521	Iota Phi Lambda	197x ?–xxxx ?	Muskegon	Michigan	Inactive	
522	**Iota Chi Lambda**	1971	Saginaw	Michigan	Active	
	Iota Psi Lambda	197x ?–xxxx ?			Inactive	
	Iota Omega Lambda				Unassigned	
	**Kappa Alpha Lambda**	197x ?	Seaside	California	Active	
525	**Kappa Beta Lambda**	197x ?	Erie	Pennsylvania	Active	
	**Kappa Gamma Lambda**	197x ?	Texarkana	Arkansas	Active	
527	**Kappa Delta Lambda**	1972	Lansing	Michigan	Active	
528	**Kappa Epsilon Lambda**	October 1972	Landover	Maryland	Active	
529	**Kappa Zeta Lambda**	1973	Clarksville	Tennessee	Active	
	**Kappa Eta Lambda**	197x ?	Bakersfield	California	Active	
531	**Kappa Theta Lambda**	197x ?	Teaneck	New Jersey	Active	
532	**Kappa Iota Lambda**	197x ?	Willingboro Township	New Jersey	Active	
	Kappa Kappa Lambda	197x ?–xxxx ?			Inactive	
	Kappa Lambda Lambda				Unassigned	
534	Kappa Mu Lambda	197x ?–xxxx ?	Lorain	Ohio	Inactive	
535	**Kappa Nu Lambda**	July 1, 1974	Sheffield	Alabama	Active	(Note: Chapter was previously housed at Leighton, Alabama.)
536	**Kappa Xi Lambda**	August 22, 1974	New York City	New York	Active	
	**Kappa Omicron Lambda**	July 2, 1974	Vallejo	California	Active	
538	**Kappa Pi Lambda**	September 26, 1974	Peoria	Illinois	Active	
539	**Kappa Rho Lambda**	October 1, 1974	Evansville	Indiana	Active	
540 ?	**Kappa Sigma Lambda**	November 1, 1974	Killeen	Texas	Active	
541 ?	**Kappa Tau Lambda**	November 24, 1974	Valdosta	Georgia	Active	
542	**Kappa Upsilon Lambda**	December 3, 1975	Mid-Hudson Valley	New York	Active	
543	**Kappa Phi Lambda**	March 1, 1975	Columbia	Maryland	Active	
544	**Kappa Chi Lambda**	January 17, 1975	Waukegan	Illinois	Active	
545	**Kappa Psi Lamba**	1975	Kalamazoo	Michigan	Active	
546	**Mu Alpha Lambda**	February 7, 1975	DeKalb	Illinois	Active	
547 ?	**Mu Beta Lambda**	197x ?	Honolulu	Hawaii	Active	
548 ?	**Mu Gamma Lambda**	1975	Hattiesburg	Mississippi	Active	
549	**Mu Delta Lambda**	197x ?	Springfield	Illinois	Active	
550 ?	**Mu Epsilon Lambda**	197x ?	Conway	South Carolina	Active	
551 ?	**Mu Zeta Lambda**	October 7, 1975	Polk County and Lakeland	Florida	Active	
552 ?	**Mu Eta Lambda**	197x ?	Madison	Wisconsin	Active	
553	**Mu Theta Lambda**	197x ?	Providence	Rhode Island	Active	
554 ?	Mu Iota Lambda	197x ?–xxxx ?			Inactive	
555 ?	**Mu Kappa Lambda**	April 5, 1976	Carbondale	Illinois	Active	
	Mu Lambda Lambda				Unassigned	
556 ?	**Mu Mu Lambda**	August 14, 1976	Glen Ellyn	Illinois	Active	
557 ?	Mu Nu Lambda	197x ?–xxxx ?			Inactive	
558 ?	Mu Xi Lambda	197x ?–xxxx ?			Inactive	
559 ?	**Mu Omicron Lambda**	197x ?	Blytheville	Arkansas	Active	
560 ?	**Mu Pi Lambda**	1977	Brookhaven	Mississippi	Active	
561 ?	**Mu Rho Lambda**	197x ?	Longview	Texas	Active	
562 ?	**Mu Sigma Lambda**	197x ?	Culver City	California	Active	
563 ?	Mu Tau Lambda	197x ?–xxxx ?			Inactive	
564 ?	Mu Upsilon Lambda	197x ?–xxxx ?			Inactive	
565 ?	**Mu Phi Lambda**	197x ?	Seoul	South Korea	Active	
566 ?	**Mu Chi Lambda**	December 4, 1977	Rock Island	Illinois	Active	
567 ?	**Mu Psi Lambda**	March 20, 1978	Homewood	Alabama	Active	
	Mu Omega Lambda				Unassigned	
568 ?	**Nu Alpha Lambda**	197x ?	Marrero	Louisiana	Active	
569 ?	**Nu Beta Lambda**	197x ?	Stockton	California	Active	
570	**Nu Gamma Lambda**	197x ?	Glassboro	New Jersey	Active	
571	**Nu Delta Lambda**	197x ?	Chesapeake	Virginia	Active	
572 ?	**Nu Epsilon Lambda**	197x ?	Richland	Washington	Active	
573 ?	**Nu Zeta Lambda**	197x ?	Anchorage	Alaska	Active	
574 ?	**Nu Eta Lambda**	197x ?	Gainesville	Florida	Active	
575 ?	**Nu Theta Lambda**	197x ?	St. Martinville	Louisiana	Active	
576 ?	**Nu Iota Lambda**	December 5, 1979	Kinston	North Carolina	Active	
577 ?	Nu Kappa Lambda	19xx ?–xxxx ?			Inactive	
	Nu Lambda Lambda				Unassigned	
578 ?	**Nu Mu Lambda**	19xx ?	DeKalb County and Decatur	Georgia	Active	
579 ?	Nu Nu Lambda	19xx ?–xxxx ?			Inactive	
580 ?	Nu Xi Lambda	19xx ?–xxxx ?			Inactive	
581	**Nu Omicron Lambda**	19xx ?	Fort Lee	Virginia	Active	
582 ?	**Nu Pi Lambda**	March 27, 1981	Arlington	Texas	Active	
583 ?	Nu Rho Lambda	198x ?–xxxx ?			Inactive	
584 ?	Nu Sigma Lambda	198x ?–xxxx ?			Inactive	
585 ?	**Nu Tau Lambda**	198x ?	Santa Ana	California	Active	
586 ?	Nu Upsilon Lambda	198x ?–xxxx ?			Inactive	
587 ?	**Nu Phi Lambda**	198x ?–2020	Okinawa	Japan	Active	
588 ?	**Nu Chi Lambda**	198x ?	Iowa City	Iowa	Active	
589 ?	**Nu Psi Lambda**	May 15, 1981	Bloomington	Illinois	Active	
	Nu Omega Lambda	198x ?			Unassigned	
590	**Xi Alpha Lambda**	1981	Prince William County	Virginia	Active	
591 ?	**Xi Beta Lambda**	198x ?	Temple	Texas	Active	
592 ?	**Xi Gamma Lambda**	198x ?	Beaufort	South Carolina	Active	
593	**Xi Delta Lambda**	March 5, 1982	Henrico County	Virginia	Active	
594 ?	**Xi Epsilon Lambda**	198x ?	Columbia	Missouri	Active	
595 ?	**Xi Zeta Lambda**	1982	Moss Point	Mississippi	Active	
596 ?	**Xi Eta Lambda**	198x ?	North Harris County	Texas	Active	
597 ?	**Xi Theta Lambda**	198x ?	Spartanburg	South Carolina	Active	
598 ?	**Xi Iota Lambda**	198x ?	Camarillo	California	Active	
599 ?	**Xi Kappa Lambda**	198x ?	Missouri City	Texas	Active	
	Xi Lambda Lambda				Unassigned	
600 ?	Xi Mu Lambda	198x ?–xxxx ?			Inactive	
601 ?	**Xi Nu Lambda**	198x ?	Baton Rouge	Louisiana	Active	
602	**Xi Xi Lambda**	198x ?	Frederick	Maryland	Active	
603 ?	**Xi Omicron Lambda**	198x ?	Fort Myers	Florida	Active	
604 ?	Xi Pi Lambda	198x ?–xxxx ?			Inactive	
605 ?	Xi Rho Lambda	198x ?–xxxx ?			Inactive	
606 ?	Xi Sigma Lambda	198x ?–xxxx ?			Inactive	
607 ?	**Xi Tau Lambda**	March 3, 1984	North Dallas County	Texas	Active	
608 ?	Xi Upsilon Lambda	198x ?–xxxx ?			Inactive	
609 ?	**Xi Phi Lambda**	January 18, 1984	Summerville	South Carolina	Active	
610 ?	Xi Chi Lambda	198x ?–xxxx ?			Inactive	
611 ?	**Xi Psi Lambda**	November 17, 1984	Palmetto	Florida	Active	
	Xi Omega Lambda				Unassigned	
612	**Omicron Alpha Lambda**	198x ?	Fredericksburg	Virginia	Active	
613 ?	**Omicron Beta Lambda**	June 15, 1985	Clearwater	Florida	Active	
614 ?	Omicron Gamma Lambda	198x ?–xxxx ?			Inactive	
615	**Omicron Delta Lambda**	April 26, 1985	Philadelphia	Pennsylvania	Active	
616 ?	**Omicron Epsilon Lambda**	198x ?	Amarillo	Texas	Active	
617 ?	**Omicron Zeta Lambda**	198x ?	Fayetteville	Arkansas	Active	
618	**Omicron Eta Lambda**	September 1, 1985	Washington	D.C.	Active	
619 ?	**Omicron Theta Lambda**	August 31, 1985	Hayward	California	Active	
620 ?	**Omicron Iota Lambda**	198x ?	Columbia	South Carolina	Active	
621 ?	**Omicron Kappa Lambda**	198x ?	Sumter	South Carolina	Active	
622 ?	**Omicron Lambda Lambda**	198x ?	Washington	D.C.	Active	
623 ?	**Omicron Mu Lambda**	198x ?	Cobb County and Marietta	Georgia	Active	
623 ?	**Omicron Nu Lambda**	198x ?	Fort Knox	Kentucky	Active	
624 ?	**Omicron Xi Lambda**	198x ?	Grandview	Missouri	Active	
625 ?	Omicron Omicron Lambda	198x ?–xxxx ?			Inactive	
626 ?	Omicron Pi Lambda	198x ?–xxxx ?			Inactive	
627 ?	**Omicron Rho Lambda**	1987	Vicksburg	Mississippi	Active	
628 ?	**Omicron Sigma Lambda**	1987	Murfreesboro	Tennessee	Active	
629 ?	**Omicron Tau Lambda**	198x ?	Aiken	South Carolina	Active	
630 ?	**Omicron Upsilon Lambda**	198x ?	Delray Beach	Florida	Active	
631 ?	**Omicron Phi Lambda**	198x ?	East Point	Georgia	Active	(Note: Chapter formed in Liberty County, Georgia but went dormant due to military deployments and a lack of members. It was later reformed as Sigma Gamma Lambda chapter.)
632 ?	Omicron Chi Lambda	198x ?–xxxx ?			Inactive	
633	**Omicron Psi Lambda**	September 11, 2021	LaPlace	Louisiana	Active	
	Omicron Omega Lambda				Unassigned	
634 ?	**Pi Alpha Lambda**	May 1, 1988	College Station	Texas	Active	
635 ?	Pi Beta Lambda	19xx ?–xxxx ?			Inactive	
636 ?	**Pi Gamma Lambda**	19xx ?	Morrow	Georgia	Active	
637 ?	**Pi Delta Lambda**	19xx ?	Georgetown	South Carolina	Active	
638 ?	**Pi Epsilon Lambda**	January 24, 1990	Auburn and Opelika	Alabama	Active	
639 ?	**Pi Zeta Lambda**	199x ?	Reno	Nevada	Active	
640 ?	**Pi Eta Lambda**	199x ?	Dublin	Georgia	Active	
641 ?	**Pi Theta Lambda**	March 11, 1991	San Antonio	Texas	Active	
642 ?	**Pi Iota Lambda**	199x ?	Tifton	Georgia	Active	
643 ?	Pi Kappa Lambda	199x ?–xxxx ?			Inactive	
	Pi Lambda Lambda				Unassigned	
644 ?	Pi Mu Lambda	199x ?–xxxx ?			Inactive	
645 ?	**Pi Nu Lambda**	199x ?	Arkadelphia	Arkansas	Active	
646 ?	**Pi Xi Lambda**	199x ?	Salt Lake City	Utah	Active	
647 ?	**Pi Omicron Lambda**	199x ?	Fort Leavenworth	Kansas	Active	
648 ?	**Pi Pi Lambda**	199x ?	Slidell	Louisiana	Active	
649 ?	Pi Rho Lambda	199x ?–xxxx ?			Inactive	
650 ?	**Pi Sigma Lambda**	1992	Oxford	Mississippi	Active	
651	**Pi Tau Lambda**	199x ?	Burlington	Vermont	Active	
652	**Pi Upsilon Lambda**	August 1, 1993	Largo	Maryland	Active	
653 ?	Pi Phi Lambda	199x ?–xxxx ?			Inactive	
654 ?	Pi Chi Lambda	199x ?–xxxx ?			Inactive	
655 ?	**Pi Psi Lambda**	March 26, 1996	Quincy	Florida	Active	
	Pi Omega Lambda				Unassigned	
656 ?	**Rho Beta Lambda**	January 25, 1998	Henderson	North Carolina	Active	
657 ?	**Rho Alpha Lambda**	March 28, 1998	Jacksonville	North Carolina	Active	
658 ?	**Rho Gamma Lambda**	1998	Greenwood	Mississippi	Active	
659 ?	**Rho Delta Lambda**	199x ?	Anderson	South Carolina	Active	
660 ?	**Rho Epsilon Lambda**	1998	Natchez	Mississippi	Active	
661 ?	**Rho Zeta Lambda**	September 4, 1999 – 1999; October 21, 2006	Evanston	Illinois	Active	
662 ?	**Rho Eta Lambda**	January 1, 2000	Madison and Decatur	Alabama	Active	
663 ?	**Rho Theta Lambda**	June 4, 2000	Ahoskie	North Carolina	Active	
664	**Rho Iota Lambda**	200x ?	Chesterfield County	Virginia	Active	
665 ?	**Rho Kappa Lambda**	200x ?	Duluth	Georgia	Active	
	Rho Lambda Lamba				Unassigned	
666 ?	**Rho Mu Lambda**	200x ?	Waycross	Georgia	Active	
667 ?	**Rho Nu Lambda**	September 14, 2002	Carrollton	Texas	Active	
668 ?	**Rho XI Lambda**	2004	Canton	Mississippi	Active	
669 ?	**Rho Omicron Lambda**	200x ?	Fort Walton Beach	Florida	Active	
670 ?	**Rho Pi Lambda**	200x ?	Carrolton	Georgia	Active	
671 ?	Rho Rho Lambda	200x ?–20xx ?			Inactive	
	**Rho Sigma Lambda**	200x ?	McDonough	Georgia	Active	
672	**Rho Tau Lambda**	200x ?	Baltimore	Maryland	Active	
	**Rho Upsilon Lambda**	February 8, 2009	Dothan	Alabama	Active	
674	**Rho Phi Lambda**	20xx ?	Johannesburg	South Africa	Active	
675	**Rho Chi Lambda**	20xx ?	London	England	Active	
676	Rho Psi Lambda	June 24, 2010 – 20xx ?	The Bronx	New York	Inactive	
	Rho Omega Lambda				Unassigned	
677	**Sigma Alpha Lambda**	July 24, 2010	Charles County	Maryland	Active	
678 ?	**Sigma Beta Lambda**	201x ?	Freeport	The Bahamas	Active	
679	**Sigma Gamma Lambda** (see Omicron Phi Lambda)	January 30, 2012	Katy and Cypress	Texas	Active	
930	**Sigma Delta Lambda**	July 21, 2012	Southfield	Michigan	Active	
	**Sigma Epsilon Lambda**	February 11, 2013	Toronto	Ontario, Canada	Active	
934	**Sigma Zeta Lambda**	201x ?	Morris County	New Jersey	Active	
	**Sigma Eta Lambda**	June 29, 2013	Conyers, Covington, Rockdale County, and Walton County	Georgia	Active	
939	**Sigma Theta Lambda**	June 14, 2014	Hinesville, Bryan County, Liberty County, and Long County	Georgia	Active	
	**Sigma Iota Lambda**	2016	Southaven	Mississippi	Active	
128	**Alpha Zeta Lambda (Second)**	September 21, 2016	Morgantown	West Virginia	Active	
	**Sigma Kappa Lambda**	February 3, 2018	Bloomington	Indiana	Active	
	Sigma Lambda Lambda				Unassigned	
958	**Sigma Mu Lambda**	201x ?	Southeastern Pennsylvania	Pennsylvania	Active	
	Sigma Nu Lambda	201x–20xx ?			Inactive	
	**Sigma Xi Lambda**	July 27, 2019	Paducah	Kentucky	Active	
	**Sigma Omicron Lambda**	July 27, 2019	Fayetteville	Georgia	Active	
	**Sigma Pi Lambda**	July 27, 2019	Orange Park	Florida	Active	
	**Sigma Rho Lambda**	20xx ?	Bartlett	Tennessee	Active	
	**Sigma Sigma Lambda**	20xx ?	Clinton	Mississippi	Active	
968	**Sigma Tau Lambda**	July 26, 2020	Fort Mill	South Carolina	Active	
969	**Sigma Upsilon Lambda**	August 19, 2020	Brown County and Winnebago County	Wisconsin	Active	
	Sigma Phi Lambda	202x–20xx ?			Inactive	
971	**Sigma Chi Lambda** (see Beta Alpha Lambda First)	October 2020	Jersey City	New Jersey	Active	(Note: Beta Alpha Lambda First was an earlier chapter located in Jersey City.)
972	**Sigma Psi Lambda**	May 23, 2021	Abu Dhabi	United Arab Emirates	Active	
	Sigma Omega Lambda				Unassigned	
973	**Tau Alpha Lambda**	2021	Accra	Ghana	Active	
974	**Tau Beta Lambda**	June 30, 2021	Pétion-Ville	Haiti	Active	
975	**Tau Gamma Lambda**	July 17, 2021	Alpharetta and Sandy Springs	Georgia	Active	
976	**Tau Delta Lambda**	July 17, 2021	San Juan	Puerto Rico	Active	
	**Tau Epsilon Lambda**	202x ?	Columbia County	Georgia	Active	
	**Tau Zeta Lambda**	2021	Santo Domingo	Dominican Republic	Active	
	**Tau Eta Lambda**	202x ?	Saint Thomas	U.S. Virgin Islands	Active	
973	**Tau Sigma Lambda**	202x ?	Accra	Ghana	Active	
