= Joseph Endom Jones =

American journalist (1852–1922)

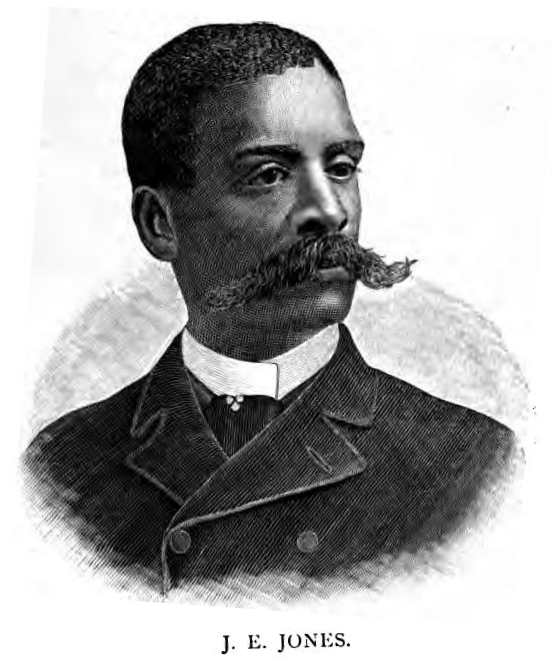
- Born: October 15, 1852; Lynchburg, Virginia, U.S.
- Died: October 14, 1922 (aged 69); Richmond, Virginia, U.S.
- Occupation(s): Professor, minister

Religious life
- Religion: Baptist

Joseph Endom Jones (October 15, 1852–October 14, 1922) was an American Baptist minister and professor at the Richmond Theological Seminary and Virginia Union University in Richmond, Virginia from 1876 to 1922. He was a major leader in the Baptist Church among blacks in Virginia. His son, Eugene Kinckle Jones, was a leader in the National Urban League.

== Early life ==
Joseph E. Jones was born a slave in Lynchburg, Virginia, on October 15, 1852. At the age of six he started to work at a tobacco factory. Jones' mother believed that the end of slavery was near and that her boy should learn to read and write. She convinced another slave owned by the same family as herself, Robert A. Perkins, to teach Jones, coming to their home several nights per week. About 1864, the arrangement changed and Jones went to Perkins' cabin for lessons on Sunday mornings. However, near the close of the American Civil War (1861-8165), the master learned that Perkins could read and write and sold him. Jones' mother then convinced a sick Confederate soldier to teach him, paying in food. These lessons ended when the war ended, but Perkins opened a private school and the boy enrolled. Jones has heretofore been a poor student, but thereafter he excelled. He also attended a private school taught by James Monroe Gregory, later a professor at Howard University. In the spring of 1868, he was baptized and made a member of the Court Street Baptist Church in Lynchburg.

== Career ==
In October 1868, he entered the Richmond Institute, which became known as the Richmond Theological Seminary, where he stayed for three years. In April 1871, he moved to Hamilton, New York where he started preparatory school for Madison University (now called Colgate University), which he finished in 1872 and began studies at Madison. He graduated from Madison University in June 1876. He was then appointed chair of Greek and Church History where he taught classes in language and philosophy at the Richmond Institute by the American Baptist Home Mission Society of New York City. He was ordained in 1877 and in 1879 he earned a Master of Arts from Madison. In November 1883, he was elected corresponding secretary of the Baptist Foreign Mission Convention of the United States, a position he held until September 1893. In 1885, he was made chair of Homiletics and Greek at Richmond Theological Seminary. At his death he was professor of Church Polity and Homiletics.

He contributed to numerous newspapers and edited the Baptist Companion, a Virginia journal and later the Virginia Baptist Reporter along with D. N. Vesser, J. D. Lewis, and W. T. Johnson. He was a member of the Educational Board of the Virginia Baptist State convention. He was granted the degree of Doctor of Divinity by Selma University. He was pastor of Bethesda Baptist church near Petersburg, Virginia and was a major leader in the Virginia Baptist Church. He was said to have installed more pastors in charges than any other black man in America.

== Personal life and death ==
On June 21, 1882 he married Rosa D. Kinckle of Lynchburg, who was a teacher in the public schools. Shortly later she was put in charge of music at Hartshorn Memorial College. They had two sons, one, Eugene Kinckle Jones was the executive secretary of the National Urban League.

Jones died on the morning of October 14, 1922. His funeral was held at First Baptist Church in Richmond, Virginia.
