= Rosa Kinckle Jones =

American music teacher (1858–1932)

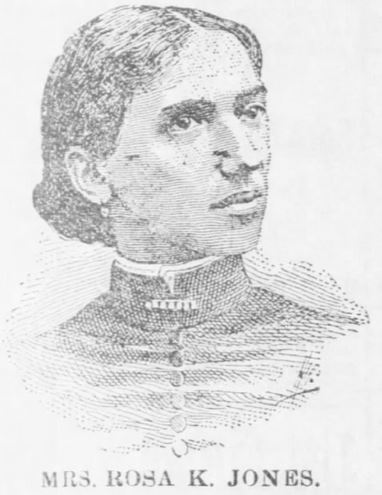
Rosa Kinckle Jones, 1901

Rosa Kinckle Jones (née Rosa Daniel Kinckle; 1858–1932) was an African American music teacher from the U.S. state of Virginia. She was one of the first 10 women who graduated from the Normal School of Howard University, and she headed Hartshorn Memorial College's music department for 40 years, being one of only two African American faculty members.

== Early years and education ==
Rosa Daniel Kinckle was born in Lynchburg, Virginia, in 1858, to free black parents. Jones attended the public school of that city until 1877, when she left for Howard University, from which she graduated with honor in 1880.

== Career ==
She devoted the first years of her public services to teaching, having taught with great success in the State of Virginia and city of Lynchburg for two years. Along with her sister, Alice Walker Kinckle, she was one of the first African-American teachers in Lynchburg Public Schools.

Jones was well-read and cultured, having "a voice of unusual compass", and was an excellent teacher of vocal music; but it is as a pianist that she was especially distinguished. Jones was possessed of natural ability in the musical line, but in addition to this, she had excellent instruction from competent teachers from early childhood, continuing the study in the city of Washington, D.C., finally taking a course in harmony at the New England Conservatory of Music. She was considered one of its most prominent, if not the most prominent and successful teacher of music in the Richmond area. For almost 40 years, she was a highly accomplished teacher at the Hartshorn Memorial College as well as a private instructor. She retired in 1928.

== Community activism ==
Outside of her work at Hartshorn, Jones was the president of the Maggie Walker's Woman's Union Beneficial Department which was committed to "financial protection and opportunities for women and their families."

== Personal life ==
In 1882, she married Rev. Dr. Joseph Endom Jones, of the Richmond Theological Seminary in a double wedding, the other couple being her sister Alice Walker Kinckle and Jones's best friend and fellow professor, David Nathaniel Vassar. The Joneses had two sons, Henry Endom Jones and Eugene Kinckle Jones, who provided a home for his mother in Queens after her retirement. She remained active however, accompanying her son and daughter-in-law on a trip to Europe in 1928. She died in 1932.
