= National Urban League =

American civil rights organization

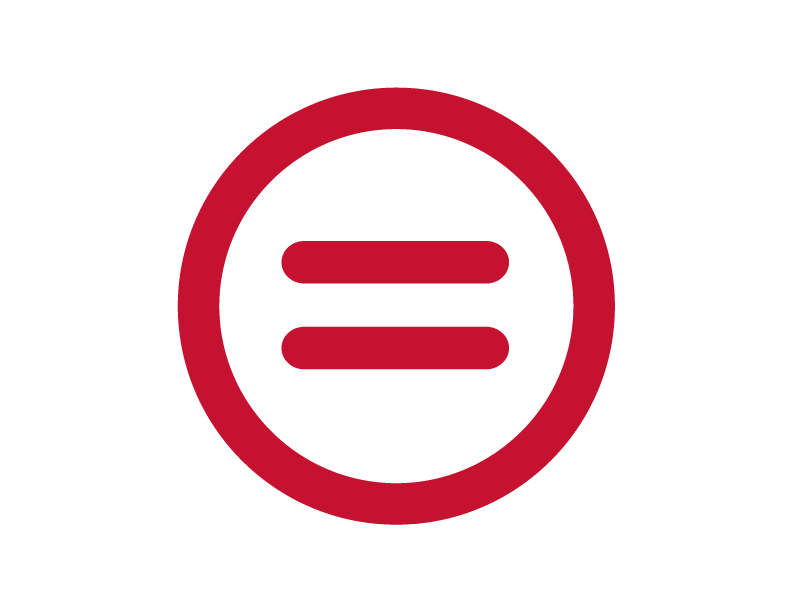
- Formation: September 29, 1910; 116 years ago
- Founder: Ruth Standish Baldwin; George Edmund Haynes
- Founded at: New York City
- President: Marc Morial
- Website: nul.org

The National Urban League (NUL), formerly known as the National League on Urban Conditions Among Negroes, is a nonpartisan historic civil rights organization based in New York City that advocates on behalf of economic and social justice for African Americans and against racial discrimination in the United States. It is the oldest and largest community-based organization of its kind in the nation. Its current president is Marc Morial.

== History ==
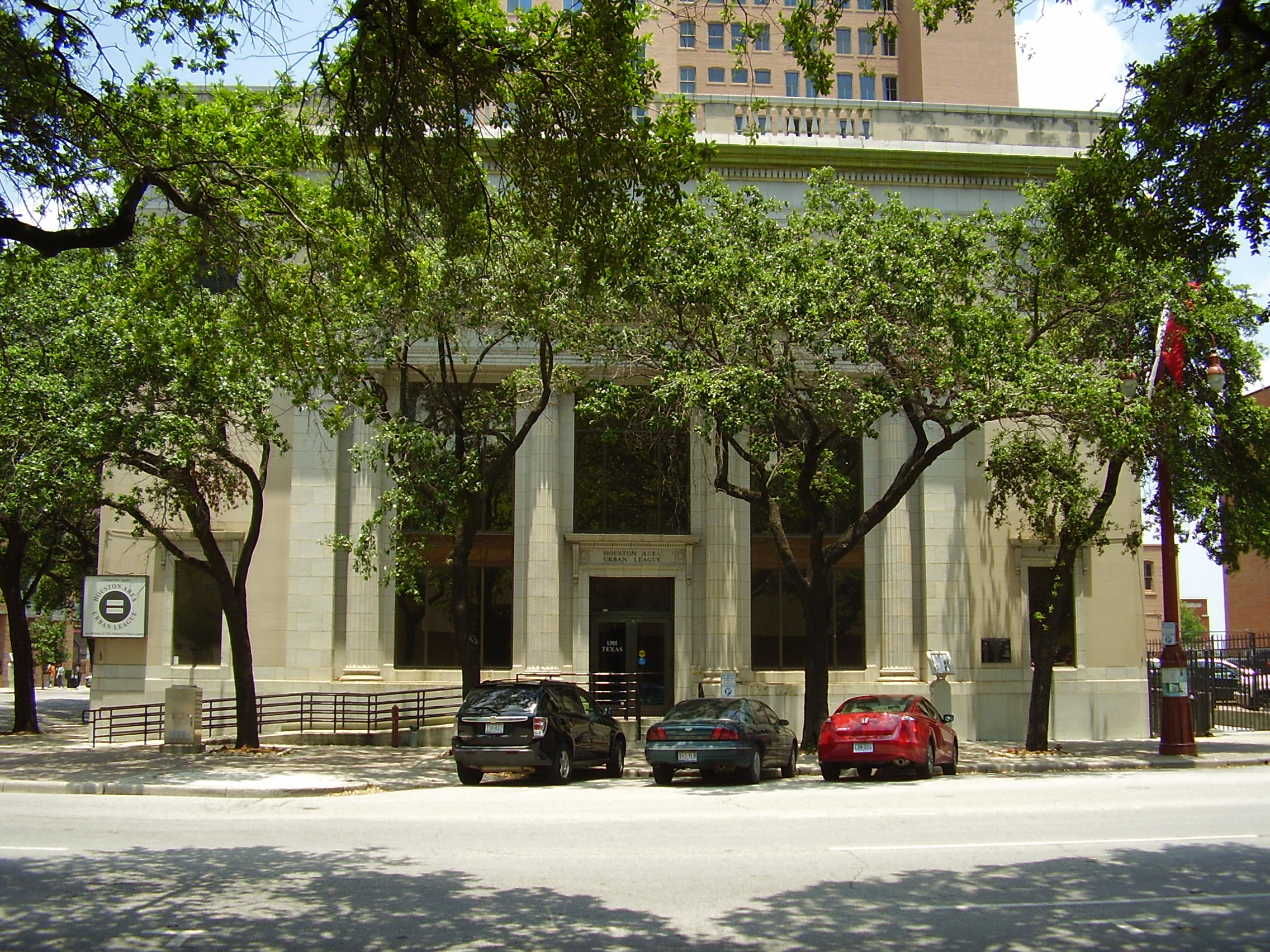
Houston Area Urban League building in Downtown Houston

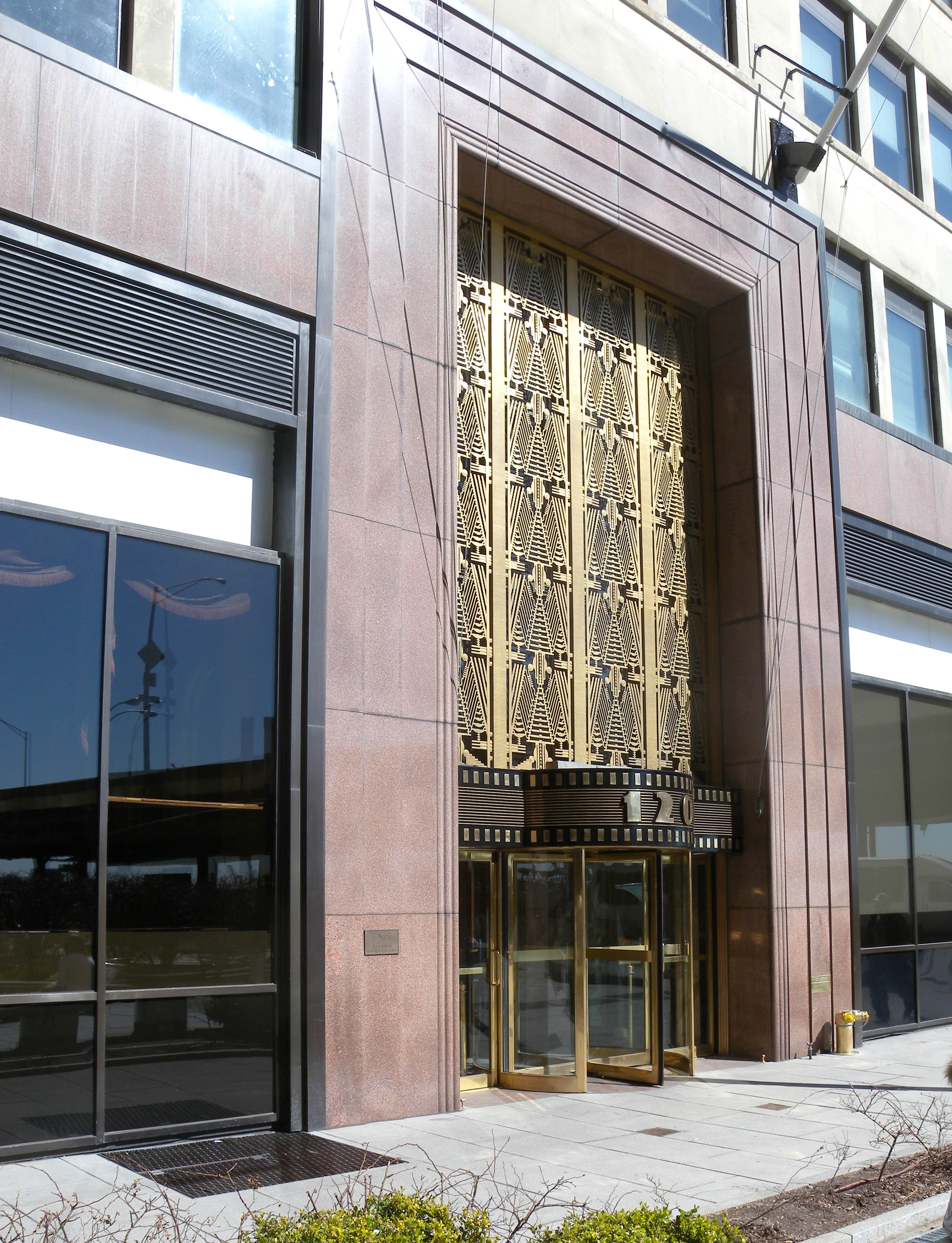
Wall Street, New York

The Committee on Urban Conditions Among Negroes was founded in New York City on September 29, 1910, by Ruth Standish Baldwin and Dr. George Edmund Haynes, among others. It merged with the Committee for the Improvement of Industrial Conditions Among Negroes in New York (founded in New York in 1906) and the National League for the Protection of Colored Women (founded in 1905), and was renamed the National League on Urban Conditions Among Negroes. Haynes served as the organization's first Executive Director.

In 1918, Eugene K. Jones took the leadership of the organization. Under his direction, the League significantly expanded its multifaceted campaign to crack the barriers to black employment, spurred first by the boom years of the 1920s, and then by the desperate years of the Great Depression.

In 1920, the organization took its present name, the National Urban League. The mission of the Urban League movement, as stated by the National Urban League, is "to enable African Americans to secure economic self-reliance, parity, power and civil rights." When the organization expanded its facilities to conduct more research in 1920, the new Department of Research came under the charge of Lillian Anderson Turner Alexander, a rising civil rights activist recruited by Jones.

Jones played a significant role in President Franklin D. Roosevelt's administration, taking leave from the League to head the Department of Commerce unit for the study of "Negro problems", and serving as part of a group of African-American advisors known as the "Black Cabinet".

In 1941, Lester Granger was appointed Executive Secretary and led the NUL's effort to support the March on Washington proposed by A. Philip Randolph, Bayard Rustin and A. J. Muste to protest racial discrimination in defense work and the military. A week before the March was scheduled to take place, President Roosevelt issued an executive order creating the Fair Employment Practices Committee.

In the wake of World War II, Black veterans who fought racial hatred overseas returned to the United States determined to fight it at home, giving new energy to the Civil Rights Movement. As hundreds of thousands of new jobs opened up, shifting the economy from industrial manufacturing to a white-collar, service-oriented economy, the National Urban League turned its attention to placing HBCU graduates in professional positions. The NUL helped push for fair hiring practices and giving Black workers the opportunity to find secure industry jobs. It helped act as a connector to local everyday workers and the federal government policies.

In 1961, Whitney Young became executive director amidst the expansion of activism in the civil rights movement, which provoked a change for the League. Young substantially expanded the League's fund-raising ability and made the League a full partner in the civil rights movement. In 1963, the League hosted the planning meetings of A. Philip Randolph, Martin Luther King Jr. and other civil rights leaders for the August March on Washington for Jobs and Freedom. During Young's ten-year tenure at the League, he initiated programs such as "Street Academy", an alternative education system to prepare high school dropouts for college; and "New Thrust", an effort to help local black leaders identify and solve community problems. Young also pushed for federal aid to cities.

Clarence M. Pendleton, Jr., was, from 1975 to 1981, the head of the Urban League in San Diego, California. In 1981, U.S. President Ronald W. Reagan tapped Pendleton as the chairman of the United States Commission on Civil Rights, a position which he held until his sudden death in 1988. Pendleton sought to steer the commission in the conservative direction in line with Reagan's views on social and civil rights policies.

In 1994, Hugh Price was appointed as president of the Urban League.

=== 21st century ===
In 2003, Marc Morial, former mayor of New Orleans, Louisiana, was appointed the league's eighth President and Chief Executive Officer. He worked to reenergize the movement's diverse constituencies by building on the legacy of the organization and increasing the profile of the organization.

The National Urban League is an organizational member of the Coalition to Stop Gun Violence, which advocates gun control. In 1989, it was the beneficiary of all proceeds from the Stop the Violence Movement and their hip hop single, "Self Destruction".

In May 2017, the National Urban League produced the State of Black America TV Town Hall, which aired on TV One in 2017 and 2018. The TV Town Hall elevated social issues related to African Americans through an interview style format with celebrity guests. The show was executive produced by Rhonda Spears Bell.

In February 2018, the National Urban League launched a weekly podcast, For the Movement, which discusses persistent policy, social and civil rights issues affecting communities of color.

As of 2022, the National Urban League has 92 affiliates serving 300 communities, in 36 states and the District of Columbia. The National Urban League provides direct services in the areas of education, health care, housing, jobs, and justice—providing services to more than 3 million people nationwide. The organization also has a Washington Bureau that serves as its research, policy and advocacy arm on issues relating to Congress and the Administration.

=== Lawsuit with the Trump Administration ===
On February 19, 2025, the National Urban League joined civil rights organizations National Fair Housing Alliance and the AIDS Foundation of Chicago in a lawsuit against the executive orders 14151, 14168, and 14173 of the Trump administration, on the grounds that these infringe upon civilians' rights to free speech and due process.

== State of Black America ==
The State of Black America is an annual report published by the league.

== Presidents ==
The presidents (or executive directors) of the National Urban League have been:

Presidents	From	To	Background
George Edmund Haynes	1910	1918	social worker
Eugene Kinckle Jones	1918	1940	civil rights activist
Lester Blackwell Granger	1941	1961	civic leader
Whitney Moore Young, Jr.	1961	1971	civil rights activist
Vernon Eulion Jordan, Jr.	1971	1981	attorney
John Edward Jacob	1982	1994	civil rights activist
Hugh Bernard Price	1994	2002	attorney foundation executive
Marc Haydel Morial	2003	Current	attorney

== See also ==
- Affiliates:
  - Chicago Urban League
  - Urban League of Central Carolinas
  - Urban League of Portland
  - Indianapolis Urban League
