= Lester Granger =

American civil rights leader (1896–1976)

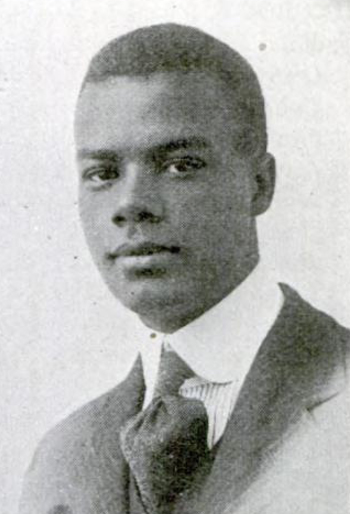

Executive Director of the National Urban League
- In office 1941–1961
- Preceded by: Eugene Kinckle Jones
- Succeeded by: Whitney Young

Personal details
- Born: September 16, 1896 Newport News, Virginia, U.S.
- Died: January 9, 1976 (aged 79) Alexandria, Louisiana, U.S.
- Education: Dartmouth College
- Occupation: Civic leader, social worker

Lester Blackwell Granger (September 16, 1896 – January 9, 1976) was an African American social worker, and civic leader who headed the National Urban League (NUL) from 1941 to 1961.

== Early life ==
Granger was born on September 16, 1896, in Newport News, Virginia. His father, William “Ran” Randolph Granger was born in Barbados where he worked as a merchant ship's cabin boy. At the age of 16 Ran deserted ship when they were docked in a U.S. port and found his way to Philadelphia, Pennsylvania. Ran would then attend Bucknell University and then followed by Howard University. After graduating, he would then attend the University of Vermont where he earned a medical degree.

While completing his undergrad, Ran took a trip during the summer to go to Richmond, Virginia. It is on this trip that he would meet his wife, Mary Louise Turpin. Initially planning to become a minister, Ran, with the guidance of Mary Lou, decided to go to medical school at the University of Vermont while she would stay in Virginia as a teacher until he graduated in the winter of 1889. In 1890 he would return to Richmond, and the two would get married in February of the same year.

The newly married couple would make their way to Little Rock, Arkansas, where Ran would begin his first medical practice. On December 22, 1890, they welcomed their first child, William Richard Randolph. Due to the racial climate, the Grangers would leave Arkansas within a year and move to Guthrie, Oklahoma, a rapidly growing African American community. In 1892 the Grangers welcomed a second child, Augustus Turpin, and in 1894 a third child, Leo Yearwood.

In 1895 the Grangers packed up again due to Jim Crow laws in Oklahoma, and moved back east to Newport News, Virginia; it was here where Ran would become one of the leading Black physicians in the city. The Grangers would have three more children while in Newport News: Lester Blackwell in 1896, Lloyd Maceo in 1898, and Carl Victor in 1902. Mary Lou began by homeschooling all of the children, but eventually each one of them would be enrolled in private school.

Once again unsatisfied with the treatment of African Americans in the area, the Grangers would be on the move, this time to Newark, New Jersey; this is where Lester would spend the majority of his childhood. Similar to his five brothers, Lester attended Barringer High School, where he excelled academically and athletically running track. Following graduation in 1914, Lester then enrolled at Dartmouth College; all of the Granger children enrolled at Dartmouth except for Augustus who graduated from Penn Dental School. A member of the Alpha Phi Alpha fraternity, Lester graduated from Dartmouth in 1918 with a degree in economics. After graduating, Granger served in the Army in France during World War I in the 92nd Infantry Division as a second lieutenant.

== Career ==
Upon returning from the war, Granger joined the National Urban League as the Newark chapter's industrial relations officer. In 1922, Granger was an extension worker with the Bordentown School, New Jersey's state vocational school for African American youth, in Bordentown. He would keep this job until 1934 when he left to work again with the National Urban League, this time in New York City. Between 1934 and 1938 Granger would use his position in the NUL to fight for unionization amongst African American workers and their right to collectively bargain. In 1940, Granger became the NUL's assistant executive secretary in charge of industrial relations and continued to work to integrate racist trade unions.

In 1941, illness made the executive secretary of the NUL, Eugene Kinckle Jones, no longer able to carry out duties, and Granger was appointed as Jones' successor. During his first year as the leader of the NUL, Granger led its effort to support the March on Washington proposed by A. Philip Randolph, Bayard Rustin and A. J. Muste to protest racial discrimination in defense work and the armed forces. After much protest, President Franklin D. Roosevelt signed Executive Order 8802 into law in 1941. The order banned race based discrimination in firms with federal contracts. The passing of 8802 saw an increase in African Americans working in the manufacturing industry.

In 1945, he began working with the Department of Defense to desegregate the military, seeing first success with the Navy in February 1946. For his efforts in fighting discrimination in the military, President Harry S. Truman presented Granger with both the Medal for Distinguished Civilian Service, and the Medal for Merit. During the Civil Rights Movement of the 1960s, he insisted that the NUL continue its strategy of "education and persuasion," which the NUL continued to support.

Following World War II, the NUL shifted their focus to fund raising, and providing economic opportunities for African Americans to go to Historically Black Colleges and Universities (HBCU).

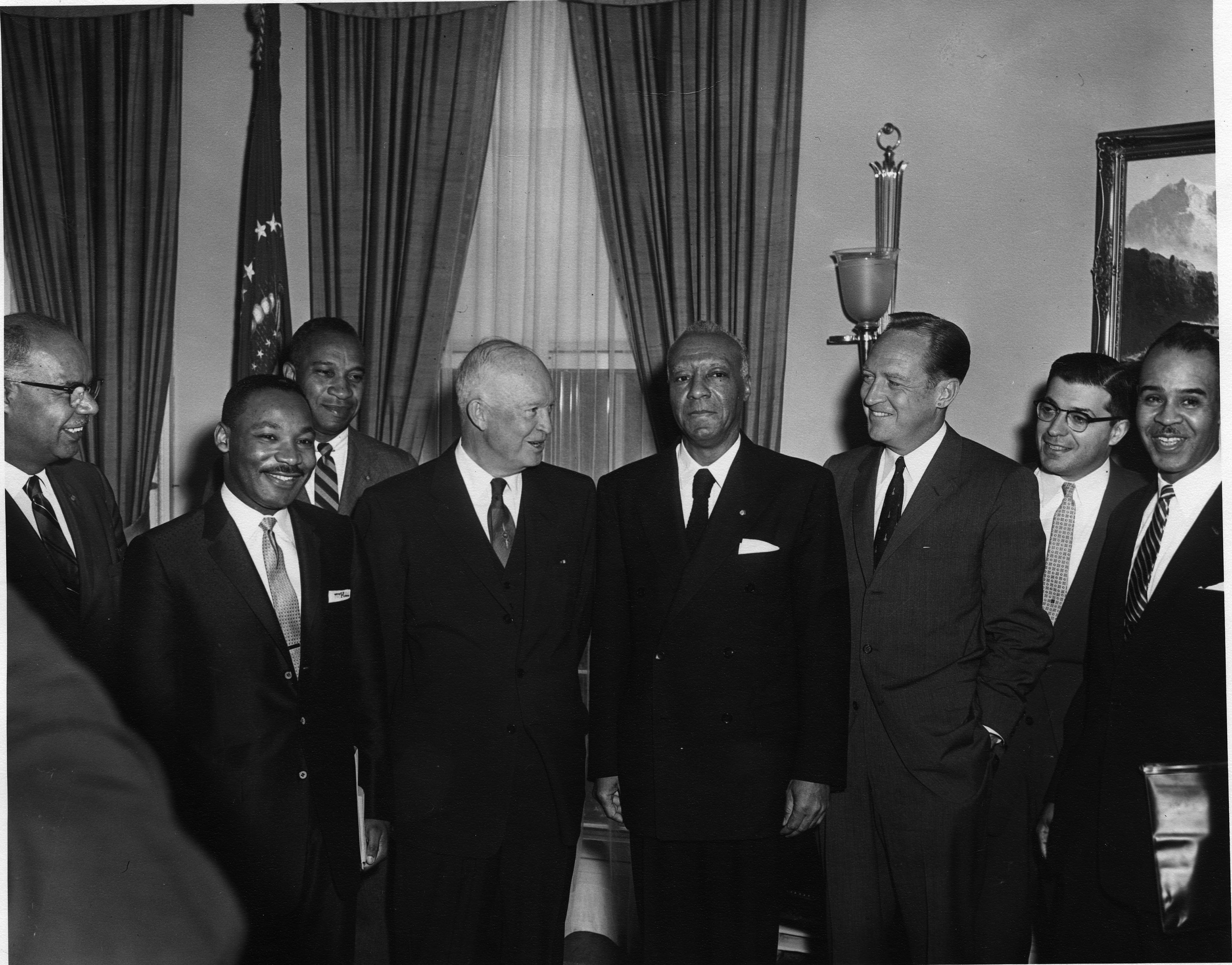
Granger (far left) and other civil rights leaders meet with President Dwight D. Eisenhower in the Oval Office, June 23, 1958

As movements such as the Southern Christian Leadership Conference (SCLC) took off, the need for the NUL began to die down. SCLC leader, Martin Luther King Jr., was fond of Granger and his work and aimed to find ways to work with the NUL. In 1958 the NUL joined A. Philip Randolph and the Brotherhood of Sleeping Car Porters, MLK, and Roy Wilkins in discussing civil rights with President Dwight D. Eisenhower. In 1961, Eisenhower would describe Granger as "...a man of the highest character and integrity."

Granger retired from the NUL in 1961 and joined the faculty of Dillard University, in New Orleans. As a professor, Granger highlighted the importance of social work in complementing the civil rights movement. Granger frequently described African American goals as "the right to work, the right to vote, the right to physical safety and the right to dignity and self-respect."

Under Grangers 20-year tenure, the NUL saw its number of affiliates grow from 41 to 63, the full-time staff increase from 216 to 456, and the annual budget grow from $600,000 to $4.5 million.

Among many other activities, he remained a leading figure in social work over the years, serving as president of the National Conference of Social Work in 1952. He was the first American citizen to serve in this capacity.

== Death and legacy ==
Granger died on January 9, 1976, in Alexandria, Louisiana.

The Tucker Foundation annually presents The Lester Granger 18 Award to a Dartmouth College graduate whose commitment to public service, social activism or nonprofit professions has been exemplary.
