= Revella Hughes =

American singer

Revella Eudosia Hughes (July 27, 1895 – October 24, 1987) was an American singer, musician, and recording artist. She was one of the best-known and most successful African-American sopranos of the first half of the 20th century.

== Early life ==
Hughes was born in Huntington, West Virginia, United States. Her parents were George and Anna B. Page Hughes. At five, her musical education began with piano and singing lessons. She earned a diploma from Hartshorn Memorial College in 1909 and later learned the violin while attending Douglass High School, from where she graduated in 1915. She received a Bachelor of Music degree from Howard University in 1917.

== Career ==
Hughes began her professional career in New York City in 1920, appearing in several Broadway shows featuring Paul Robeson, Marian Anderson, and Roland Hayes. In 1923, she was made choral director for the Broadway revue Shuffle Along. During the 1920s, she appeared on radio and stage, working on the B.F. Keith circuit in her hometown of Huntington and at the Regal Theater in Chicago.

After a substantial career as a soprano, Hughes began composing and arranging on the Hammond organ, creating a live-performance compilation titled "An Informal Hour of Music." In 1953, she toured Europe and the Middle East doing U.S.O. shows, where she played the organ and was musical arranger for Gypsy Markoff.

After retiring in 1955, Hughes was brought back to the spotlight for a round of performances connected with the Universal Jazz Coalition festival in 1980.

== Personal life ==
The artist was a member of Alpha Kappa Alpha sorority. While at Howard, she met Layton Wheaton, son of lawyer John Francis Wheaton, who became a dentist. They were married in 1920 and divorced in 1923. In 1932, Hughes returned to Huntington to care for her widowed mother. She stopped singing for a while after her mother's demise, which brought about her extensive work with the Hammond organ.

Hughes died in New York in 1987 at the age of 91.
