= Eugene Kinckle Jones =

American civil rights leader and fraternity founder (1885–1954)

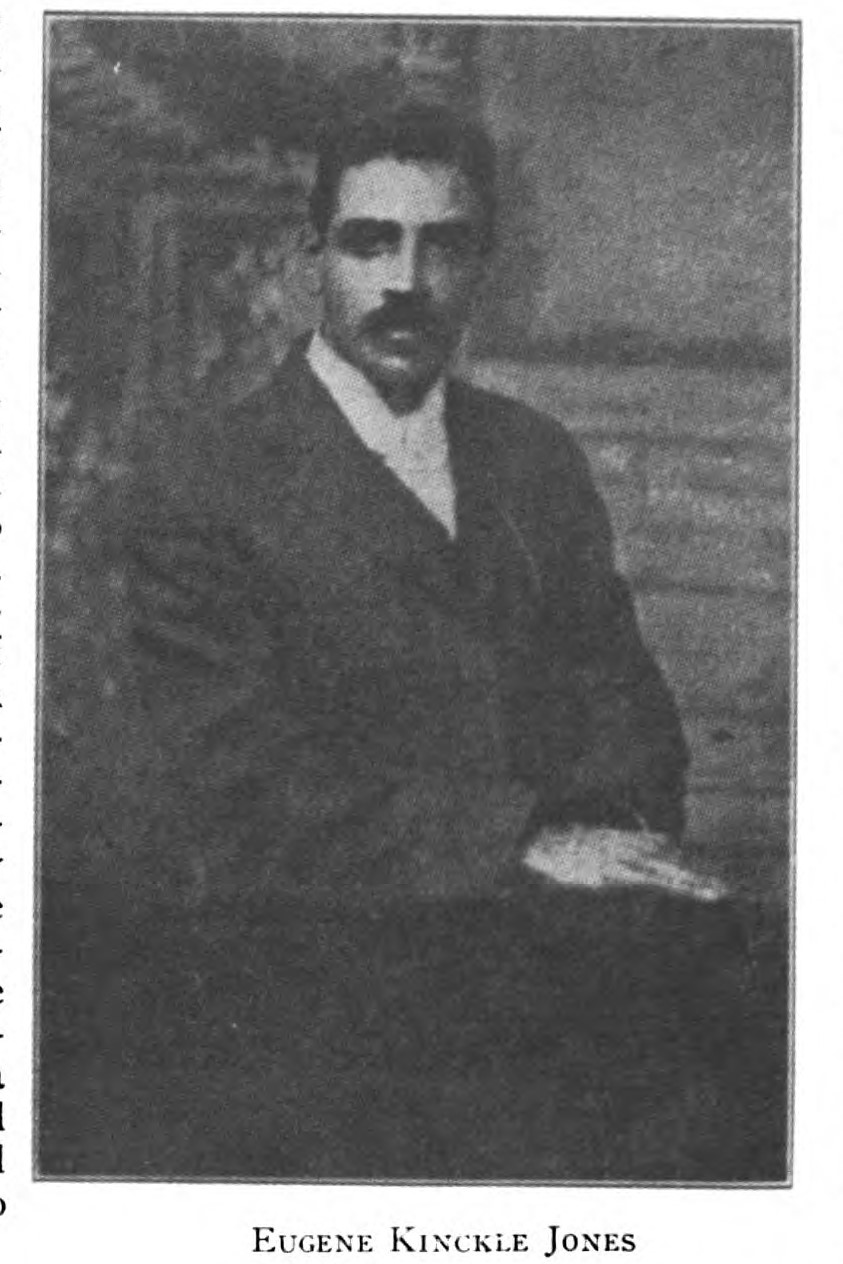
- Born: July 30, 1885; Richmond, Virginia, U.S.
- Died: January 11, 1954 (aged 68); Flushing, Queens, New York, U.S.
- Education: Cornell University
- Known for: Co-founder of Alpha Phi Alpha fraternity at Cornell University

Eugene Kinckle Jones (July 30, 1885 – January 11, 1954) was a leader of the National Urban League and one of the seven founders (commonly referred to as Seven Jewels) of Alpha Phi Alpha fraternity at Cornell University in 1906. Jones became Alpha chapter's second President.

== Early life ==
Jones was born in Richmond, Virginia to Joseph Endom Jones and Rosa Daniel Kinckle. He graduated from Richmond's Virginia Union University in 1905 and Cornell University with a master's degree in 1908. In 1909, he married Blanche Ruby Watson, and they had six children. After graduation, he taught high school in Baton Rouge, Louisiana until 1911.

== Alpha Phi Alpha ==
Jones organized the first three Fraternity chapters that branched out from Cornell: Beta at Howard University, Gamma at Virginia Union University and the original Delta chapter at the University of Toronto in Canada (now designated at Huston–Tillotson University).

Jones was a member of the first Committees on Constitution and Organization and helped write the Fraternity ritual. Jones also has the distinction of being one of the first initiates as well as an original founder. Jones' status as a founder was not finally established until 1952.

== National Urban League and labor work ==
Jones, an organizer for the National Urban League (NUL) founded the Boston Urban League in 1917 and worked for racial equality in employment, housing, and health in Massachusetts. In 1918, Jones became the first Executive Secretary of the NUL. The League, under his direction, significantly expanded its multifaceted campaign to crack the barriers to black employment, spurred first by the boom years of the 1920s, and then, by the desperate years of the Great Depression. He implemented boycotts against firms that refused to employ blacks, pressured schools to expand vocational opportunities for young people, constantly prodded Washington officials to include blacks in New Deal recovery programs, and a drive to get blacks into previously segregated labor unions. When he became Executive Secretary, he recruited rising activist Lillian A. Turner Alexander as his own secretary.

Together with Charles S. Johnson in 1923, he helped launch Opportunity a journal which addressed problems faced by blacks. In 1925, the National Conference of Social Work elected Jones treasurer, and he served the organization until 1933, rising to the position of Vice President. He was the first African American on its executive board. In 1933, Jones took a position with the Department of Commerce in Washington, D.C. as an advisor on Negro Affairs. In this role, Jones was a member of President Franklin D. Roosevelt’s Black Cabinet, an informal group of African American public policy advisors to the President.

== Legacy ==
Jones retired from the NUL in 1940 and was succeeded by Lester Granger. Jones’ correspondence with Marian Anderson in the Marian Anderson Papers, folder 2927, is held at the University of Pennsylvania, Rare Book and Manuscript Library.
