= Hartshorn Memorial College =

Former American private college in Richmond, Virginia, United States (1883-1932)

Hartshorn Memorial College was a private college for African-American women in Richmond, Virginia, active from 1883 until 1932. When it closed, it was merged into Virginia Union University.

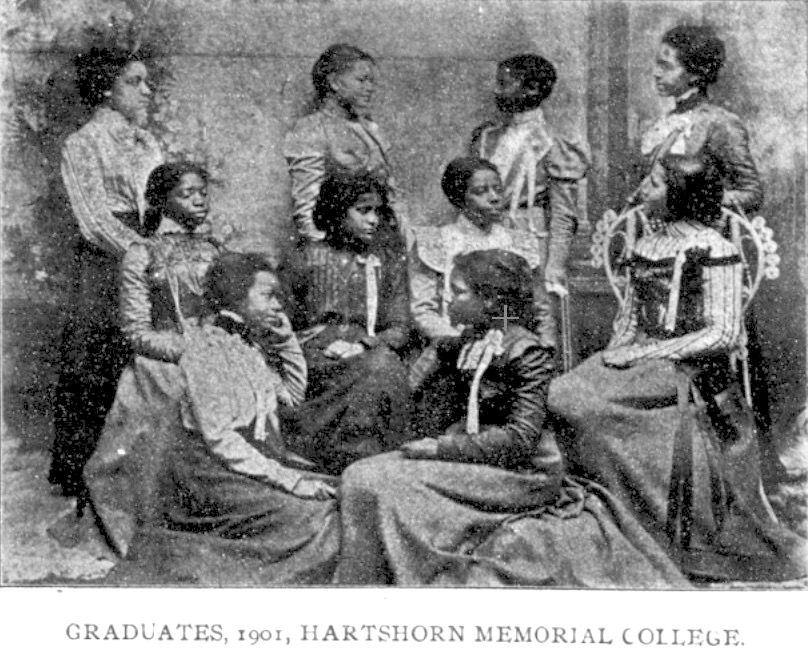
1901 photo of Hartshorn Memorial College graduates. Image found in the Richmond Planet newspaper - Volume 18, Number 24, 1 June 1901.

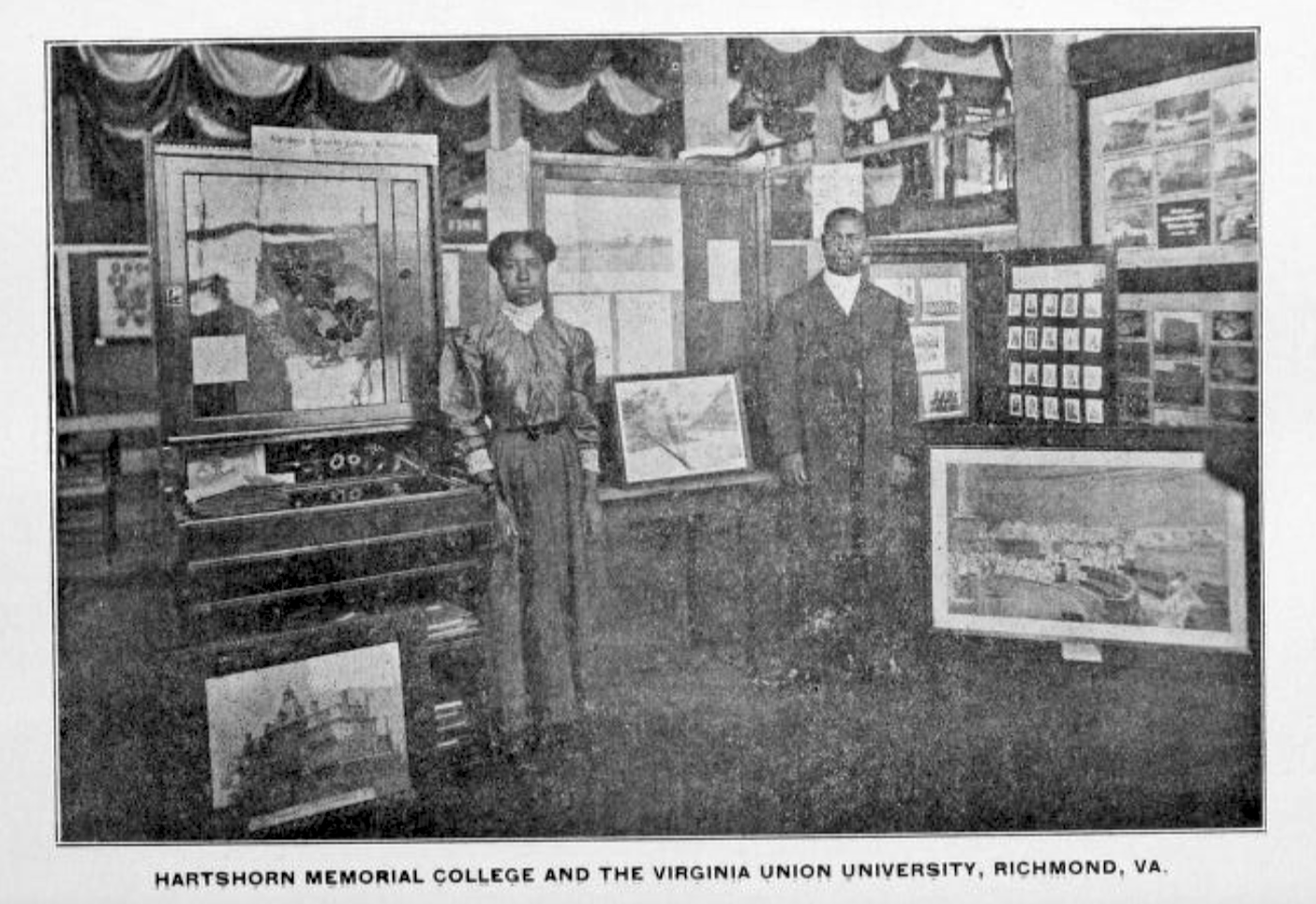
Hartshorn Memorial College and Virginia Union University at the Negro Building at the 1907 Jamestown Exposition

== History ==
Hartshorn Memorial College was created in Richmond, Virginia, in 1883 as a college for the education of African-American women. The college's namesake, Joseph C. Hartshorn donated the funds for the school in honour of his wife Rachel Hartshorn. The school was co-founded by Dr. Lyman Beecher Tefft and Carrie Victoria Dyer.

Tefft became the first president while Dyer became the principal. Classes started in the basement of the Leigh Street Ebenezer Baptist Church before moving to the corner of Lombardy and Leigh Street, the former Bowe plantation, in 1884. The site is now occupied by the Maggie L. Walker Governor's School. Hartshorn was considered a sister school to the neighbouring Virginia Union University.

In 1892 the school conferred three baccalaureate degrees, a first for an African-American women's college in the country. Geoffrey W. Rigler replaced Tefft as president in 1912 while Dyer became dean for two years before resigning. Hartshorn merged into Virginia Union University in 1932. The seal of the school was a map of Africa and Madagascar in front of a rising sun with the Latin inscription, "Sigillum colegii" (college seal).

== Curriculum ==
While Hartshorn provided homemaking classes and technical training its focus was on academics. Hartshorn was known for its teacher education including a "model classroom" program similar to today's student-teaching approach to help future students gain experience in the classroom.

Health and fitness was also a large part of the curriculum. The faculty was mostly women, including Dr. Lyman Beecher Tefft's daughter Mary who worked for free given the school's small budget. Only one African-American faculty member served at the school, Rosa Kinckle Jones, a graduate of Howard University and wife of Virginia Union University professor Joseph Endom Jones. She started at Hartshorn in 1888 and was a music instructor for almost 40 years.

== Campus life ==
The students at Hartshorn were closely supervised and it had a reputation for being a strict environment. Chapel attendance was required and any sweets were banned. The students had to follow a strict dress code, were not allowed to use the streetcars, or go on dates on the weekends. The young women participated in events with the men of Virginia Union University as well as events on their own campus such as "Industrial Teams" competitions. They were encouraged to support temperance and abstain from wearing corsets.

== Legacy ==
Shortly after merging with Virginia Union University, Hartshorn's buildings were demolished. The only physical reminder of the school is a memorial plaque on the campus of the Maggie L. Walker Governor's School. The last known alumna of the school died in 2003. The records of the Hartshorn Memorial College are held at the L. Douglas Wilder Library and Learning Resource Center at Virginia Union University and include catalogs and reunion materials.

== Notable people ==
- Bessye J. Bearden, journalist, civic activist, and mother of artist Romare Bearden
- Eva Roberta Coles Boone, educator and missionary to the Congo
- Lucy Coles, missionary
- Revella Hughes, soprano and early recording artist
- Rosa Kinckle Jones, head of the Music Department for 40 years
