= Court Street Baptist Church =

Historic church in Virginia, US

- U.S. National Register of Historic Places
- Virginia Landmarks Register
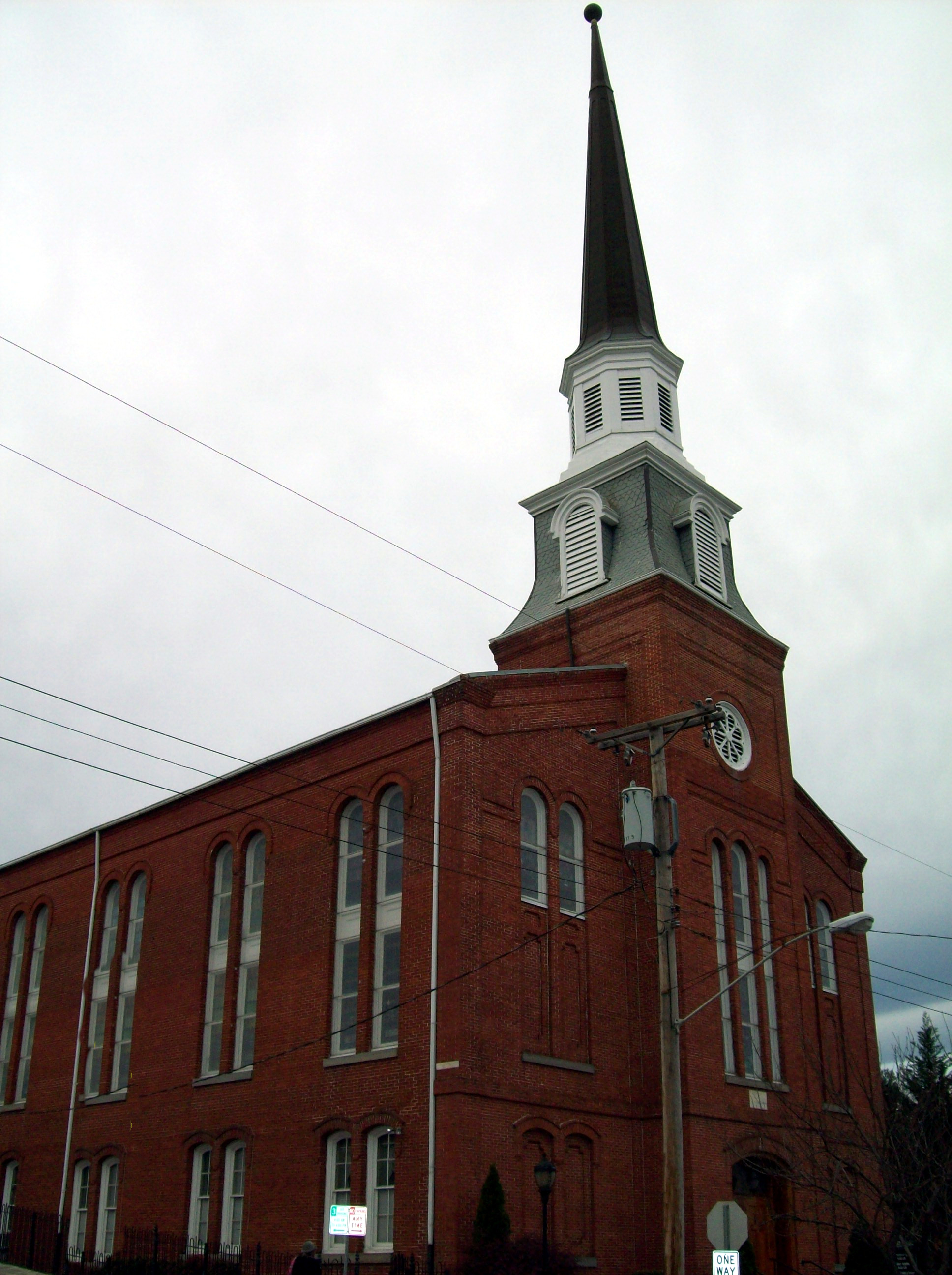
- Court Street Baptist Church, Lynchburg VA, November 2008

- Location within Virginia Location within the United States
- Location: 6th and Court Sts., Lynchburg, Virginia
- Coordinates: 37°24′58″N 79°8′50″W
- Area: 0.1 acres (0.040 ha)
- Built: 1879
- Architect: Burkholder, Robert Calhoun
- NRHP reference No.: 82004569
- VLR No.: 118-0156

Significant dates
- Added to NRHP: July 8, 1982
- Designated VLR: June 16, 1981

The tallest object on the downtown skyline of Lynchburg, Virginia, Court Street Baptist Church serves the black Baptist population of Lynchburg. Organized in 1843, the congregation—originally known as the African Baptist Church of Lynchburg—was the first of its kind in the city. The church was designed by R.C. Burkholder, and completed in 1880.
