= William McAlpine =

William McAlpine may refer to:

- William J. McAlpine (1812–1890), American civil engineer
- Sir William McAlpine, 6th Baronet (1936–2018), British businessman
- William McAlpine (tenor) (1922–2004), Scottish tenor
- William H. McAlpine (1847-1905) American minister and educator

== See also ==
- McAlpine Locks and Dam, named for William McAlpine, district engineer for the Corps of Louisville, Kentucky
