= Timothy Dodge =

American academic

- Born: February 22, 1829; Fairlee, Vermont, US
- Died: June 10, 1883 (aged 54)
- Occupation: University President
- Employer: Benedict College
- Successor: Lewis Colby

Timothy S. Dodge (1829-1883) (also known as T. S. Dodge) was a Baptist minister who served as the first president of Benedict College in South Carolina from 1871 to 1876.

== Early life in New England ==
Timothy S. Dodge was born on February 22, 1829, in Fairlee, Vermont to Phineas and Rebecca Dodge. In 1850 Dodge was living with the Richard Everett family in Fairlee while continuing his studies. He attended college in the North before eventually moving outside of New England. By 1854 he was in Boston working as a clerk at the Boston and Providence Railroad. By 1857 Dodge was also serving as clerk of Tremont Temple Baptist Church in Boston, Massachusetts when he participated in the ecclesiastical trial of Rev. Isaac Smith Kalloch. Dodge also served on Boston's YMCA committee In 1863 he was working as a bookkeeper and married Elizabeth Jane Whitney, a native of Standish, Maine with Rev. Daniel C. Eddy officiating their wedding in Boston. By 1870 he was working as a salesman in Boston.

== Founding and Presidency of Benedict College ==
On December 1, 1870, he and his wife arrived in Columbia, South Carolina where he was studying for Baptist ordination when he became the first president (principal) of Benedict College (then called Benedict Institute), which was co-founded by Bathsheba A. Benedict of Pawtucket, Rhode Island who provided the funds to purchase a former plantation as the site for the school. Dodge's first student was a sixty-six year old African American preacher who was a former slave. In addition to the academic and religious curriculum, Dodge helped to institute an industrial training program and helped facilitate financial support for the school from friends in Boston. While in South Carolina, Dodge's daughter Phoebe Benedect Dodge (Dolloff) was born in 1875.

== Later life as a pastor and death ==
In 1879 Dodge moved to Illinois and became pastor at the Calvary Baptist Church in Mattoon, Illinois. He then served as pastor of the Grant Park Baptist Church, where he was serving at the time of his death. Timothy Dodge died at age fifty-four on June 10, 1883, in Grant Park, Illinois and was buried in Union Corners Cemetery.
