= Harrison N. Bouey =

American minister

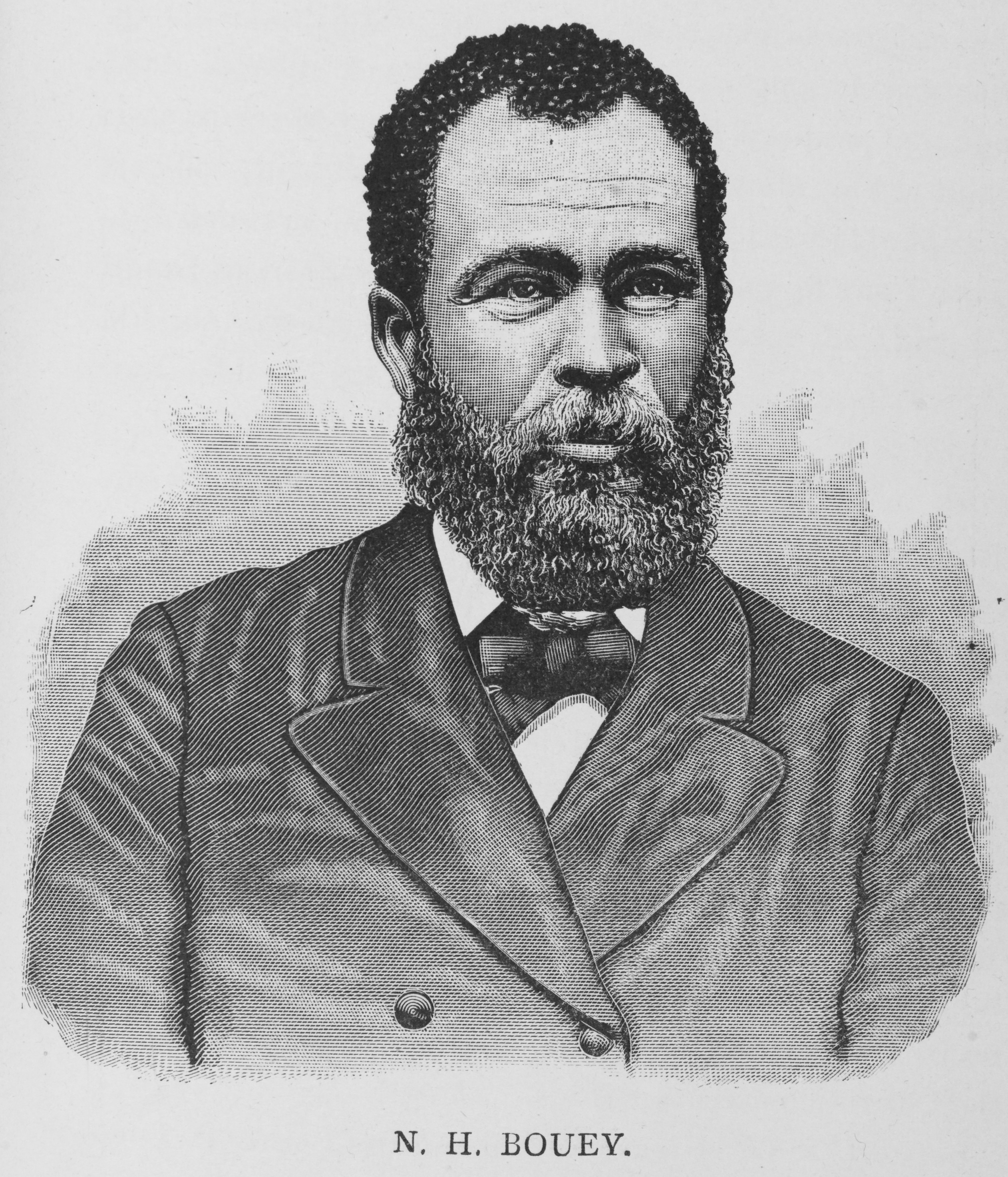
- Bouey in 1887
- Born: August 4, 1849; Columbia County, Georgia
- Died: December 15, 1909 (aged 60); Cape Mount, Liberia
- Education: Morehouse College
- Occupations: Educator, minister (Christianity), missionary, journalist
- Political party: Republican

Religious life
- Religion: Baptist

Harrison N. Bouey (August 4, 1849 – December 15, 1909) was a minister in South Carolina, Alabama, and Missouri and a missionary in Liberia. He was noted as a leader in efforts to help Africans emigrate to Africa at the end of reconstruction in the 1870s. He was also involved in education in the south, and was an early leader of Selma University in Selma, Alabama, and co-founder of Western College Preparatory School in Macon, Missouri.

== Early life ==
Harrison N. Bouey was born in Columbia County, Georgia, on August 4, 1849. As a child he moved to Augusta, Georgia, and as a young man he worked for two years as a painter's apprentice while he attended night school to get a basic education.

In the mid-1860s he passed an examination for a teacher's certificate and taught two years in the Augusta public schools. In April 1870 he was Baptized and became a member of the Springfield Baptist Church. He also entered the Baptist Theological School in Augusta, later called the Atlanta Baptist Seminary, and now Morehouse College. He graduated in the spring of 1873 and moved to Ridge Spring, South Carolina, to become principal of a school there. In 1875, he was elected probate judge of Edgefield County, South Carolina, by the Republican Party which was in control of local politics there. In the fall of 1876 he was elected county sheriff, but was not granted the position. In 1877, reconstruction ended in that portion of South Carolina and Bouey and fellow black appointee, circuit court clerk Jesse Jones were pushed out of their positions. Bouey accused Matthew Butler of threatening to kill him, Paris Simpkins and Lawrence Cain in a speech during Butler's successful United States Senate campaign.

Leaving politics, he then was ordained by the Macedonia Baptist Church in Edgefield Court House, South Carolina. Shortly after he became general missionary of South Carolina, holding the position for just over a year.

== Emigration to Liberia ==
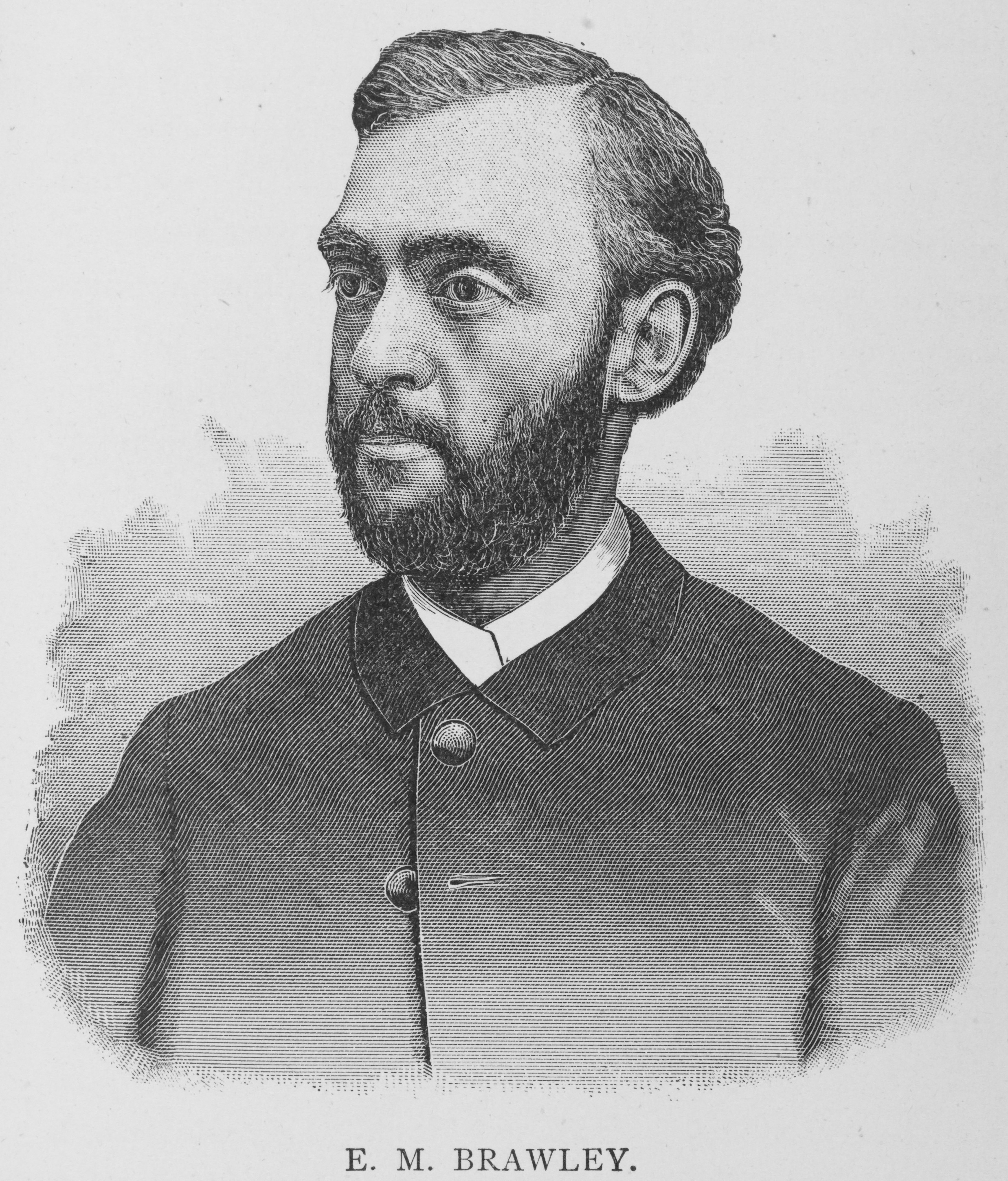
Edward M. Brawley assisted Bouey in his 1877 missionary trip to Liberia

He next responded to a call by a group of South Carolina Baptists led by Edward M. Brawley to start missionary work in Africa. Bouey, George Curtis, Benjamin F. Porter, Samuel Gaillard, Martin Delany, and others formed a Joint Stock Steamship Company of the Liberia Exodus Association to recruit as many as 300 people, equally divided men and women, to emigrate to Africa. Among those involved was William Coppinger, who sent Bouey literature to aid his cause, and John Mardenborough, who had left Edgefield County for Beaufort, South Carolina after receiving threats on his life. In South Carolina, Bouey and Mardenborough advocated for emigration of freedmen from South Carolina to Africa for both economic and religious reasons. This effort was opposed by local whites, who were afraid of losing an important labor source. He sailed from New York for Monrovia, Liberia via Liverpool on April 11, 1879 aboard the Azore with over 200 South Carolina emigrants. In Liberia, Bouey worked among the Gola people, and helped construct a road outside Royesville which came to be called the "Bouey Road". In Liberia he organized a number of churches, two Baptist associations, and a National Baptist Convention, for which he was corresponding secretary and financial agent. He then returned to America as general agent of the Liberian convention set to enlist help for the mission from American Baptists. South Carolina's support for the Liberian Mission was initially strong, but declined when Bouey resigned from this role in 1882.

== Later career ==
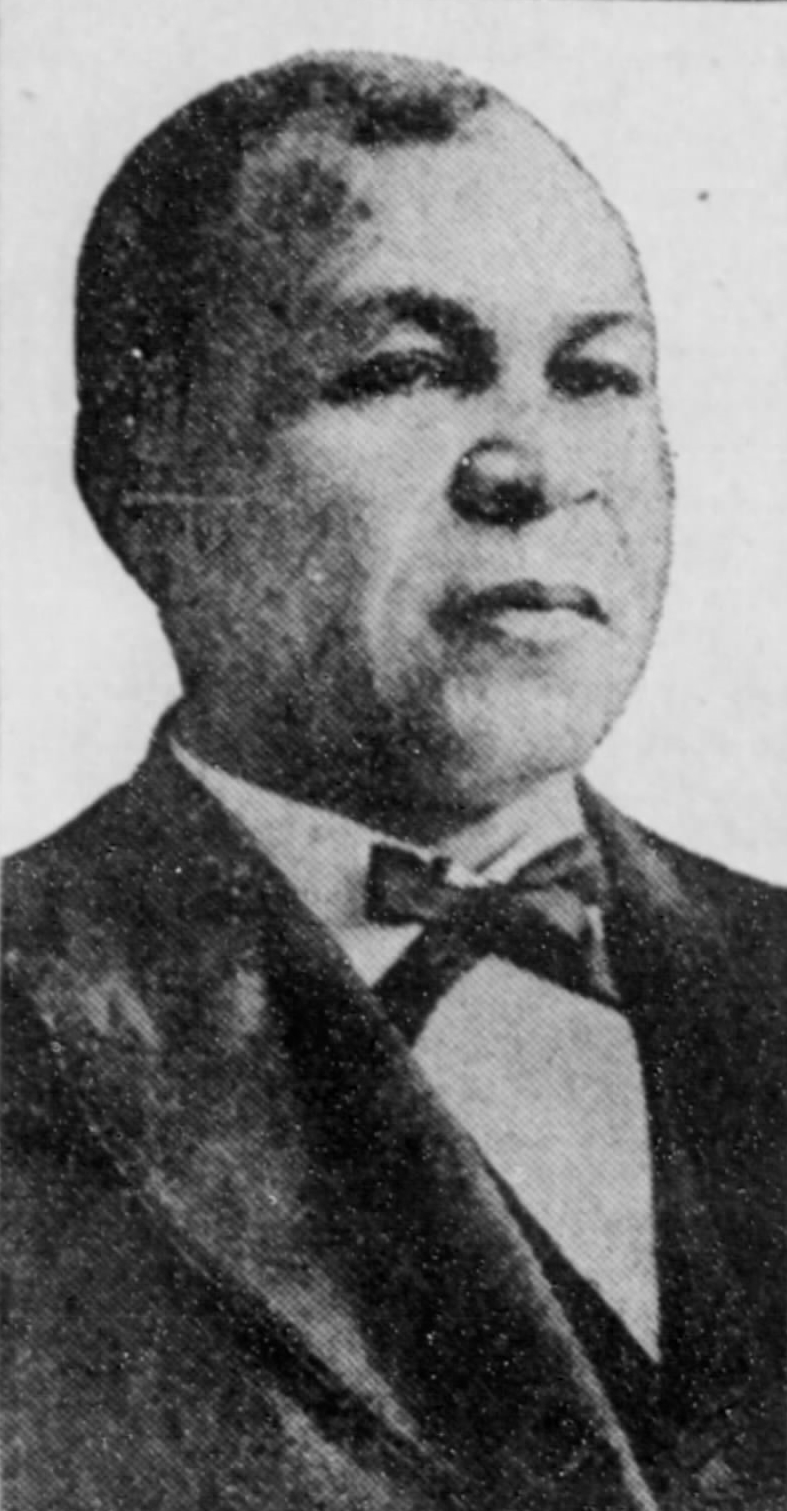
Image of Bouey from 1910 obituary

In March 1882 he became Sunday School Missionary for Alabama, and he held the position for four years. During that period he became financial agent for Selma University and was elected corresponding secretary of the State Mission Board of Alabama. In January 1886 he resigned from these positions to restore his health. At nearly the same time he was chosen associate editor and business manager for the journal, the Baptist Pioneer, a position he held for one year. At that time, he was also a member of the Board of Trustees of Selma University, a member of the State Mission Board in Alabama, and the secretary of the Foreign Mission Convention of the United States for the Third District.

He later served as pastor and superintendent of missions for Missouri Baptists and helped found Western College Preparatory School in Macon, Missouri. He again sailed to Africa in January 1902 returning to America in 1905. On December 11, 1906, Bouey and three of his four sons returned to Africa, his fourth son to join them later.

== Personal life ==
In April 1882 he married Laura P. Logan of Charleston, South Carolina. Laura died in 1897.

Bouey died on December 15, 1909, at Cape Mount and was buried on the banks of Lake Peause near the graves of Hattie J. Pressley and, allegedly, Henderson McKinney (McKinney's grave has not been found). At his death, he requested his sons be returned to the United States for their education, and L. G. Jordan and William R. Pettiford worked to help the boys.
