= Ira David Pinson =

Early 20th century American academic

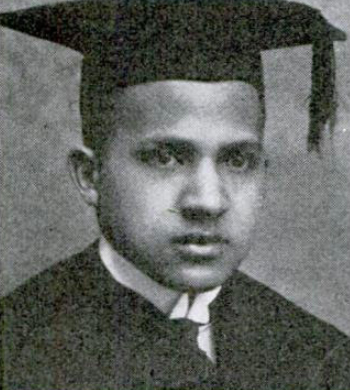
- I.D. Pinson in 1918
- Born: October 3, 1892; Pendleton, South Carolina, U.S.
- Died: July 21, 1939 (aged 46); South Hill, Virginia, U.S.
- Known for: 3rd President of Morris College

Academic background
- Education: Benedict College; Colgate University; Yale University, Divinity School

Academic work
- Discipline: Languages and philosophy
- Institutions: Morris College

Ira David Pinson (October 3, 1892 – July 21, 1939) was an American academic who became a professor of languages and philosophy, completing a Bachelor of Divinity at Yale University in 1920. From 1915 he was a member of the teaching faculty of Morris College, becoming its third president in 1930 as it struggled to survive the Great Depression. Within two years, he strengthened and steered the college to expansion. Pinson died in a car accident in 1939, at the age of 46.

== Early life and education ==
Pinson was one of two sons of Bessie Anna (Cash) and Reverend James A.S. Pinson. James Pinson graduated from Benedict College, Yale University, and Colgate Divinity School, establishing the Shiloh Baptist Church. His older brother, Sylvester, graduated from Benedict College and Meharry Medical College, practicing medicine in Pennsylvania.

Pinson earned a Bachelor of Arts (BA) degree from Benedict College in 1912, and a Master of Arts in 1913. He then gained another BA, from Colgate University in 1918, and a Bachelor of Divinity from Yale University in 1920.

== Career ==
"Humanity needs a faith that love is at the heart of life, that love is superior to hate, that men must become brotherly or they will perish, that a law of service and sacrifice underlies life, that the law of sowing and reaping is in the structure of things, that happiness is an accompaniment or consequence of the good life and never an end, and that the only permanent award of life is Creative Living."

— Ira David Pinson, 1939

Pinson was a professor at Morris College in Sumter, teaching Latin, German, Greek, and philosophy from 1915 to 1930, as well as coaching the baseball team.

The small college struggled after the 1929 stock market crash, and a loss of financial aid. Its second president, John J. Starks, left to become president of Benedict College in 1930. Morris and Benedict College merged high schools at Morris, and Morris became a junior college, only offering the first two years of college. That further reduced support financial support for Morris College, leaving it with only a year's worth of funds.

Pinson was appointed the third president of Morris College in 1930, a position he held until his death in 1939 at age 46. Within two years, he had restored the senior college and expanded the scope of the college.

Pinson was a member of Omega Psi Phi and the Mt Zion Baptist Church in Sumter, and a powerful orator.

== Family and death ==
Pinson married Bessie Alma Buckner on May 22, 1921. They had four sons, Sylvester Wesley Pinson, Eugene Pinson (a professor of music), James Pinson (an artist), and David Pinson. Pinson and one of his sons, Sylvester, died in a car accident near South Hill, Virginia in 1939. He had been driving the family to New York, and his wife and other sons all survived their injuries.

Bessie Pinson, a longtime teacher at Morris College, died in 1970.

== Honors ==
African-American businesses in Sumter closed in Pinson's honor on the day of his funeral.

The administration building at Morris College is named in Pinson's memory.
