= Vera Chandler Foster =

American social worker (1915–2001)

- Vera Chandler Foster, from a 1936 publication
- Born: Vera Adrienne Chandler; August 9, 1915; Indianola, Mississippi
- Died: February 1, 2001 (aged 85); Alexandria, Virginia
- Spouse: Luther H. Foster Jr.

Vera Chandler Foster (August 9, 1915 – February 1, 2001) was an American social worker. She worked for the United States Veterans Administration in Tuskegee, Alabama, and served on the national boards of the YWCA, Planned Parenthood, and Common Cause.

== Early life ==
Vera Adrienne Chandler was born in Indianola, Mississippi, the daughter of William Chandler and Mariah Chandler. She grew up in Omaha, Nebraska. She graduated from Omaha's Central High School in 1931, and from Fisk University in 1936. She earned a master's degree in social work at University of Chicago, and a PhD from the University of Nebraska in 1940, with a dissertation titled "A study of 100 adolescent Negro children in Omaha with especial reference to the family". In 1941 she was a Rosenwald Fellow at the University of Minnesota. She was a member of Delta Sigma Theta.

== Career ==
Foster was Dean of Women and taught sociology courses at Langston University in Oklahoma. She worked as a psychiatric social worker for the United States Veterans Administration in Tuskegee, Alabama. Her husband was the president of Tuskegee Institute, so she also had social duties as the university president's wife.

During World War II, Foster was active in the Tuskegee USO, providing hospitality and recreation to the Tuskegee Army Flying School. While her children were young, she spent summers as head counselor at Camp Indian Brook in Vermont. She served on the national boards of the YWCA, Planned Parenthood, and Common Cause. In 1963, she represented the United States at the YWCA's World Council in Denmark. She was active in the Women's International League for Peace and Freedom (WILPF), and represented the League at a conference in Moscow. She founded Alabama chapters of the WILPF, AAUW, and AARP. She was a member of the NAACP, the National Association of Social Workers, and the National Organization for Women. In 1947, she was associate editor of the Negro Year Book.

In 1981, she joined the White House Conference on Aging and the Virginia Advisory Commission on Aging.

== Publications ==
- Negro year book: A review of events affecting Negro life, 19411946 (1947, co-edited with William Hardin Hughes)
- "The Negro Press" (1947, with Jessie P. Guzman)
- "'Boswellianism': A technique in the Restriction of Negro Voting" (1949)

== Personal life ==
Vera Chandler married academic administrator Luther H. Foster Jr. in 1941. They had two children, Adrienne and Hilton. Luther Foster died in 1994. Vera Chandler Foster died in 2001, aged 85 years, in Alexandria, Virginia. Her grave is in the Tuskegee University Cemetery.
