= Benedict College =

Historically black college in Columbia, South Carolina, US

Coordinates: 34.012947°N 81.020345°W

- Former names: Benedict Institute (1870–1894)
- Motto: A Power for Good in Society
- Type: Private historically black college
- Established: December 12, 1870; 155 years ago
- Religious affiliation: American Baptist Churches USA
- Endowment: $21.7 million (2024)
- President: Roslyn Clark Artis
- Students: 1,731 (fall 2023)
- Location: Columbia, South Carolina, United States
- Campus: 110-acre (45 ha)
- Colors: Purple and gold
- Nickname: Tigers
- Sporting affiliations: NCAA Division II - SIAC
- Website: benedict.edu
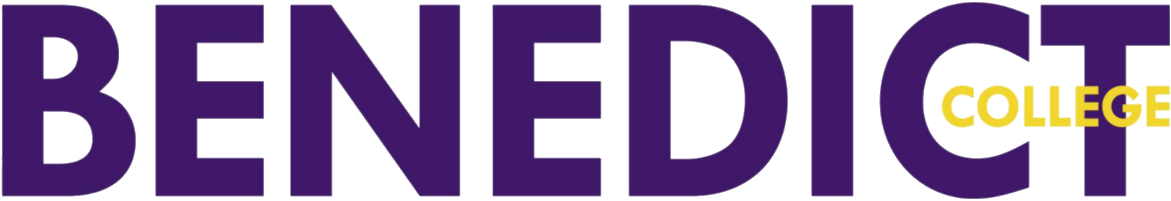
- Benedict College Historic District
- U.S. National Register of Historic Places
- U.S. Historic district
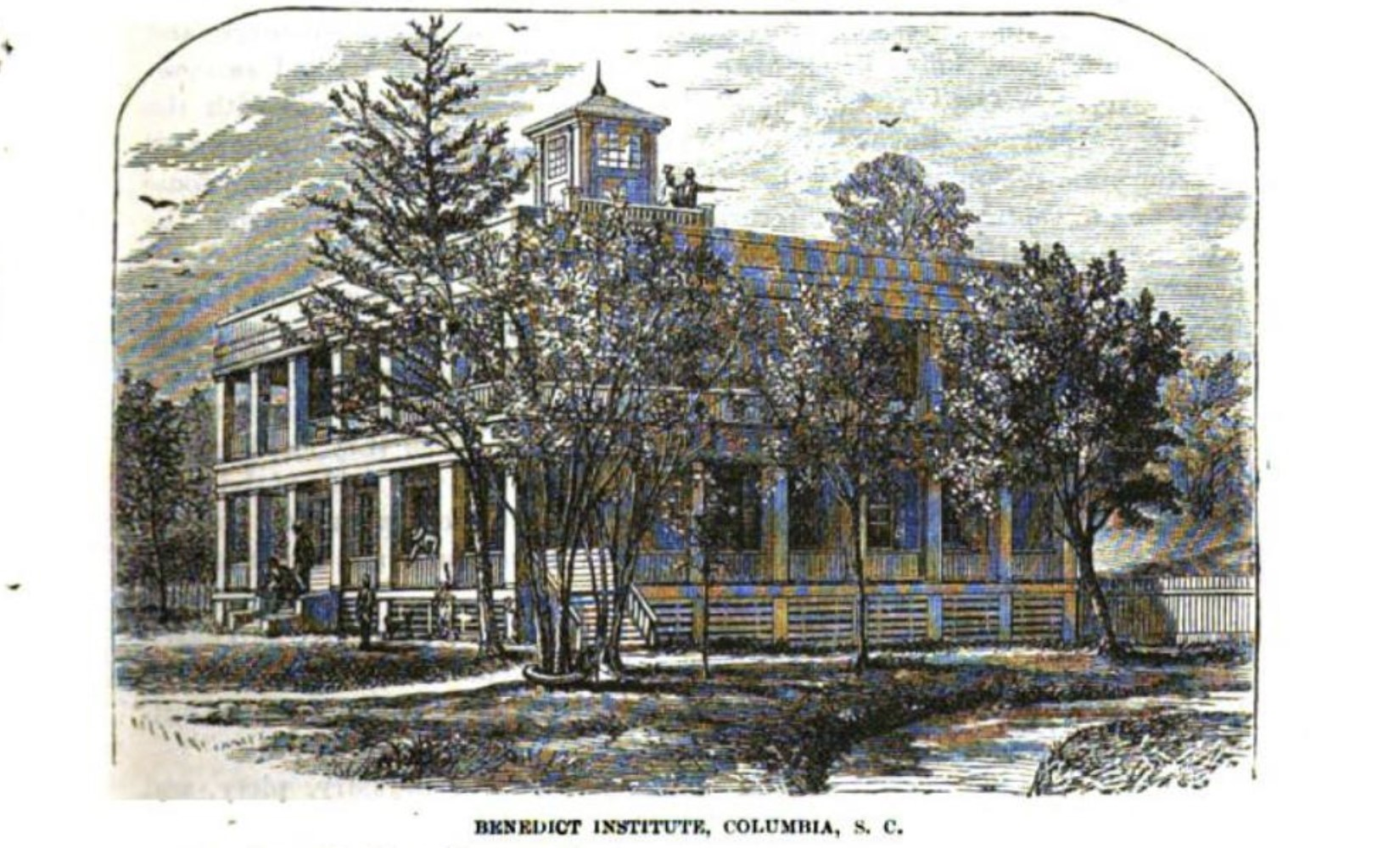
- original Benedict College building as seen in 1875

- Location within South Carolina Location within the United States
- Location: Roughly bounded by Laurel, Oak, Taylor and Harden Sts. on Benedict College campus, Columbia, South Carolina
- Area: 3.9 acres (1.6 ha)
- Architect: Urquhart, James B.
- Architectural style: Classical Revival
- NRHP reference No.: 87000809
- Added to NRHP: April 20, 1987

Benedict College is a private historically black college in Columbia, South Carolina, United States. Founded in 1870 by northern Baptists, it was originally a teachers' college. It has since expanded to offer majors in many disciplines across the liberal arts. The campus includes buildings in the Benedict College Historic District, a historic area listed on the National Register of Historic Places.

Benedict College was founded in 1870 on the land of a former 110-acre (45 ha) plantation in Columbia, South Carolina. Representing the American Baptist Home Mission Society, Bathsheba A. Benedict of Pawtucket, Rhode Island had provided $13,000 to purchase the property. This was one of the numerous educational institutions founded in the South for formerly enslaved people by northern religious mission societies, as education was seen as key to the future for African Americans.

== History ==
Benedict Institute opened on December 12, 1870.

Benedict's first class consisted of ten freedmen; the teacher was the Reverend Timothy Dodge. He was a college-educated preacher from the North, who was also appointed as president of the institute. Classes were first held in the "Big House" of the plantation, which had been built in 1839 and deteriorated during the war. The institute's mission was to prepare men and women to be "powers for good in society." Because enslaved people had been prohibited from learning to read or write, initially classes were held at the grammar school level in reading, writing, and math; other subjects included Bible and theology. Eventually, other subjects were added to the curriculum to address the original objective of the school: to train teachers and preachers.

On November 2, 1894, the institution was chartered as a four-year liberal arts college by the South Carolina legislature and its name was changed to Benedict College. In addition to funding from Baptist donors, the school received grants from the Slater Fund.

From 1870 to 1930, Benedict College was led by a succession of seven northern white Baptist ministers, all college-educated. On April 10, 1930, the Reverend John J. Starks, who earned his bachelor's degree from the college in 1891, became the first African-American president of the college. Five African-American presidents have succeeded him.

=== Late 20th century to present ===
In 1994, with a strategic planning process in place, Benedict College set an enrollment goal of "2000 by the year 2000". The goal was achieved in 1996 with an enrollment of 2,138 students. The fall 2002 enrollment was 3,000. Benedict College is engaged in an ongoing strategic planning process, which will guide the college in the 21st century.

The college is implementing a $50 million campus improvement plan, which includes land acquisition and the completion of a comprehensive athletics complex. Campus facilities improvements over the past nine years have included upgrade of residence halls by installation of air-conditioning, fire sprinkler systems, and security systems; completion of an activities field and community park; renovation of historic Antisdel Chapel, and Bacoats and Alumni halls, and restoration of historic Morgan, Pratt, and Starks halls, including the Student Leadership Development Center.

During this period, new construction has included three residence halls, a parking garage, a campus center/dining hall, an Administration Building, and a Business Development Center. Additionally, buildings were acquired to house a fitness center, and the Division of Community Development/Center for Excellence. Three apartment complexes have been purchased for student housing. As a part of the college's community development goal, it has renovated more than 50 rundown properties in the adjacent community in Columbia.

== Benedict College Historic District ==
The Benedict College Historic District was added to the National Register of Historic Places in 1987. It encompasses five buildings constructed between 1895 and 1937: Morgan Hall (1895), Pratt Hall (1902), Duckett Hall (1925), Antisdel Chapel (1932), and Starks Center (1937).

== Academics ==
Benedict offers 29 degrees from 12 departments.

In addition to offering traditional education, the college also offers continuing education for those "non-traditional students".

=== Accreditation ===
Benedict College is accredited by the Commission on Colleges of the Southern Association of Colleges and Schools to award baccalaureate degrees.

The Teacher Education Program is fully approved by the South Carolina Department of Education and the Program in Social Work is accredited by the Council on Social Work Education. The Environmental Health Science Program is fully accredited by the National Environmental Health Science and Protection Accreditation Council (EHAC).

=== Marching Tigers "Band of Distinction" ===
Benedict College Band dates back to the 1960s when the band was under the direction of student director and music major, Freddie Gallman. After Gallman the band was under the direction of Charles Alston until the mid 60's and then Roy McCullough. Under McCullough's direction the band was known as the "Tiger Band" and their most notable performance was in the 1968 Mardi Gras Parade in New Orleans. The marching band program went on a brief hiatus along with the college's football program, and the band only performed during basketball season.

In the early 1990s the band was under the direction of brother's Dr. Cecil Adderley and Dr. Cedric Adderley. In 1995 the college reinstated their football program and with a new look and high spirits the band was ready to take the field once again. The band continued to excel and in August 1998 the "Tiger Band" transformed into the "Marching Tiger Band of Distinction" under the direction of Dr. Sean E. Daniels. The band changed its marching style, drill and music that year with around 30 plus members who laid the foundation of the band's continued existence. The band under Dr. Daniels direction performed at several high schools and community events in the state of South Carolina, Georgia, Florida, North Carolina and Ohio. The band also participated in the Universal Studio Florida Holiday Parade featuring Macy's in 2006 and they were voted the favorite band in the SIAC division that year.

The program has continued to evolve and after Dr. Daniels the band was led by Herman Jones Jr., who has been credited with the band's unique sound. Before preparing to go on a sabbatical leave to study for his doctorate degree at Temple University, Jones recommended H. Wade Johnson for the position. In 2022, the band marched in the Macy's Thanksgiving Day Parade. The band is now currently under the direction of Dr. Brendan L. Johnson.

=== Benedict College Concert Choir ===
The Benedict College choir hosts spirituals, festivals and an annual Christmas concert. Linda Kersaw, one of five Richland One alumni inducted into the district's Hall of Fame, led the choir for over 20 years.

== Athletics ==
Benedict athletic teams are the Tigers. The college is a member of the Division II level of the National Collegiate Athletic Association (NCAA), primarily competing in the Southern Intercollegiate Athletic Conference (SIAC) since the 1932–33 academic year. The Tigers previously competed in the Eastern Intercollegiate Athletic Conference (EIAC) of the National Association of Intercollegiate Athletics (NAIA) from 1988–89 to 2001–02 (hence it held dual membership with both the NAIA and the NCAA).

Benedict competes in 14 intercollegiate varsity sports: Men's sports include baseball, basketball, cross country, football, tennis, track & field and volleyball; while women's sports include basketball, cheerleading, cross country, softball, tennis, track & field and volleyball.

=== Facilities ===
The college has built the Charlie W. Johnson Stadium for its football games on-campus, which opened in 2006. Basketball games are played at HRC Arena.

=== Accomplishments ===
The Benedict Tigers tennis team won the SIAC conference championship in 2015.

In 2022, the Tigers football team put together their best season in school history, winning the SIAC championship and qualifying for the NCAA Division II playoffs for the first time. In addition, Benedict also claimed the black college national championship for schools competing below the NCAA Division I level.

== Benedict College Presidents ==
- Timothy Dodge
- Lewis Colby
- E. J. Goodspeed
- Charles E. Becker
- Abraham C. Osborn
- Byron W. Valentine
- Clarence B. Antisdel
- John J. Starks
- John A. Bacoats
- Benjamin F. Payton
- Henry Ponder
- Marshall C. Grigsby
- David Swinton
- Roslyn Artis

== Notable alumni ==
Name	Class year	Notability	Reference(s)
Chino Smith		Negro league baseball player who held a career batting average of .428 in six seasons.	
Modjeska Monteith Simkins	1921	leader of African American public health reform, social reform and the civil rights movement in South Carolina	
Harold A. Stevens	1930	lawyer and former judge who served on the New York Court of General Sessions and New York Court of Appeals	
Jack B. Johnson	1970	former County Executive for Prince George's County, Maryland	
LeRoy T. Walker		former U.S. Olympic Committee Chairman	
Waliyy Dixon		Professional streetball player	
Kris Bruton		Basketball player who currently plays with the Harlem Globetrotters	
Paul Benjamin		Television and film actor	
Bennie Lewis	2009	Professional basketball player	
Annie Greene Nelson		First African American woman to publish a novel in South Carolina	
James Maxie Ponder		First African American physician in St. Petersburg, Florida	
Charles L. Purce	1879	President of Selma University and Simmons College of Kentucky	
Mary Rice Phelps	1885	Teacher and writer	
Sanco Rembert	1945	Anglican bishop and first black bishop in the Reformed Episcopal Church	
Walt Simon	1961	Pro Basketball player, Senior VP Kentucky Fried Chicken.	

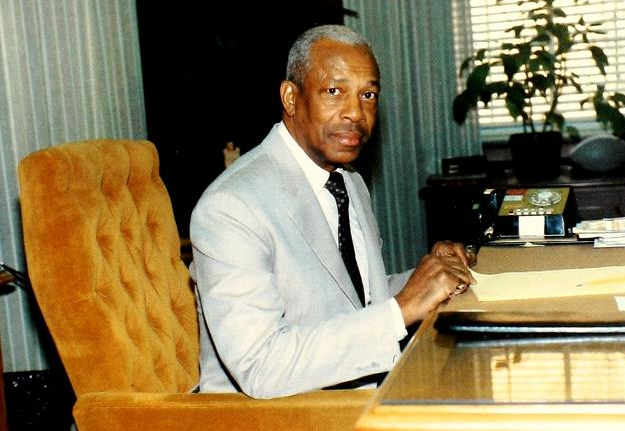
LeRoy T. Walker

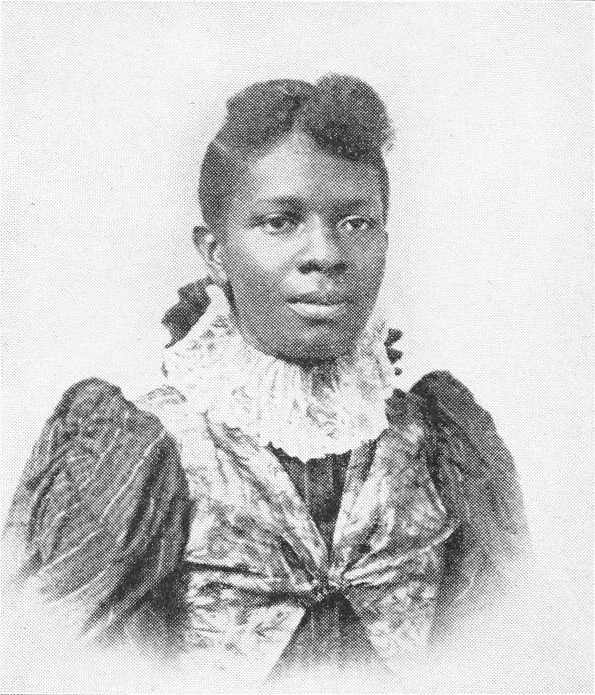
Mary Rice Phelps

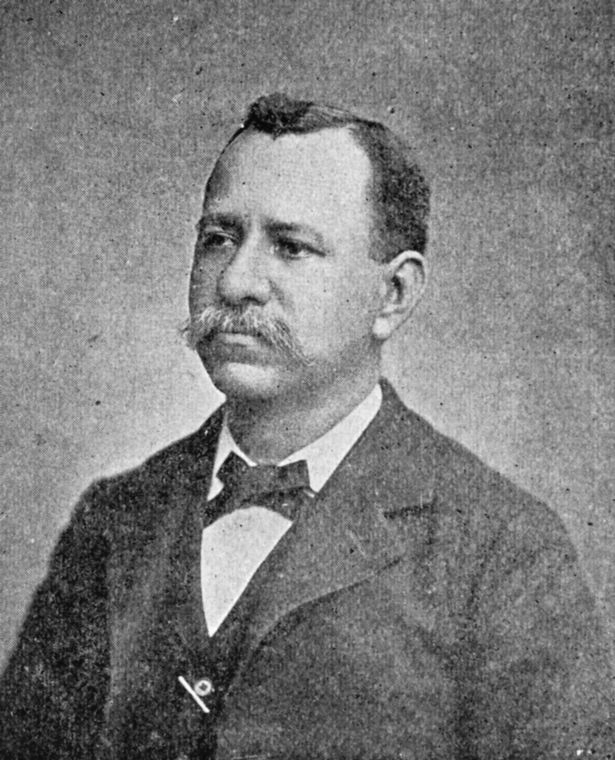
Charles L. Purce
