= Luther H. Foster Jr. =

President of Tuskegee University
- In office 1953–1981
- Preceded by: Frederick D. Patterson
- Succeeded by: Benjamin F. Payton

Personal details
- Born: March 21, 1913 Lawrenceville, Virginia, U.S.
- Died: November 27, 1994 (aged 81) East Point, Georgia, U.S.
- Spouse: Vera Chandler Foster (m. 1941)
- Children: 2
- Education: Virginia State University; Hampton University; Harvard Business School; University of Chicago

Luther Hilton Foster Jr. (March 21, 1913 - November 27, 1994) was an African-American academic administrator. He served as the fourth president of the Tuskegee Institute, a private, historically black university in Tuskegee, Alabama now known as Tuskegee University, from 1953 to 1981.

== Early life ==
Foster was born on March 21, 1913, in Lawrenceville, Virginia. His father worked for Saint Paul's College, a historically black college. He grew up between Lawrenceville and Petersburg.

Foster graduated from Virginia State University, where he earned a bachelor's degree in 1932, followed by a second bachelor's degree from Hampton University in 1934. He earned an MBA from the Harvard Business School in 1936, followed by a master's degree and a PhD from the University of Chicago in 1941 and 1951 respectively.

== Career ==
Foster began his career at Howard University, where he worked as a budget officer from 1937 to 1941. Foster joined the Tuskegee Institute, now known as Tuskegee University, in 1941, where he worked as a business manager until 1953. He served as its fourth president from 1953 to 1981, which included the Civil Rights era. Under his leadership, enrollment grew from 2,000 to 3,500.

Foster served as the president of the United Negro College Fund and the Academy for Educational Development. He also served on the board of the Joint Center for Political and Economic Studies and Sears.

Foster was inducted into the Alabama Academy of Honor. In 1958, he was awarded the Star of Africa from Liberia.

== Personal life and death ==
Foster married social worker Vera Chandler in 1941. They had two children. He resided in Alexandria, Virginia.

Foster died of a heart attack on November 27, 1994, in East Point, Georgia, at 81.
