= Edward M. Brawley =

Educator

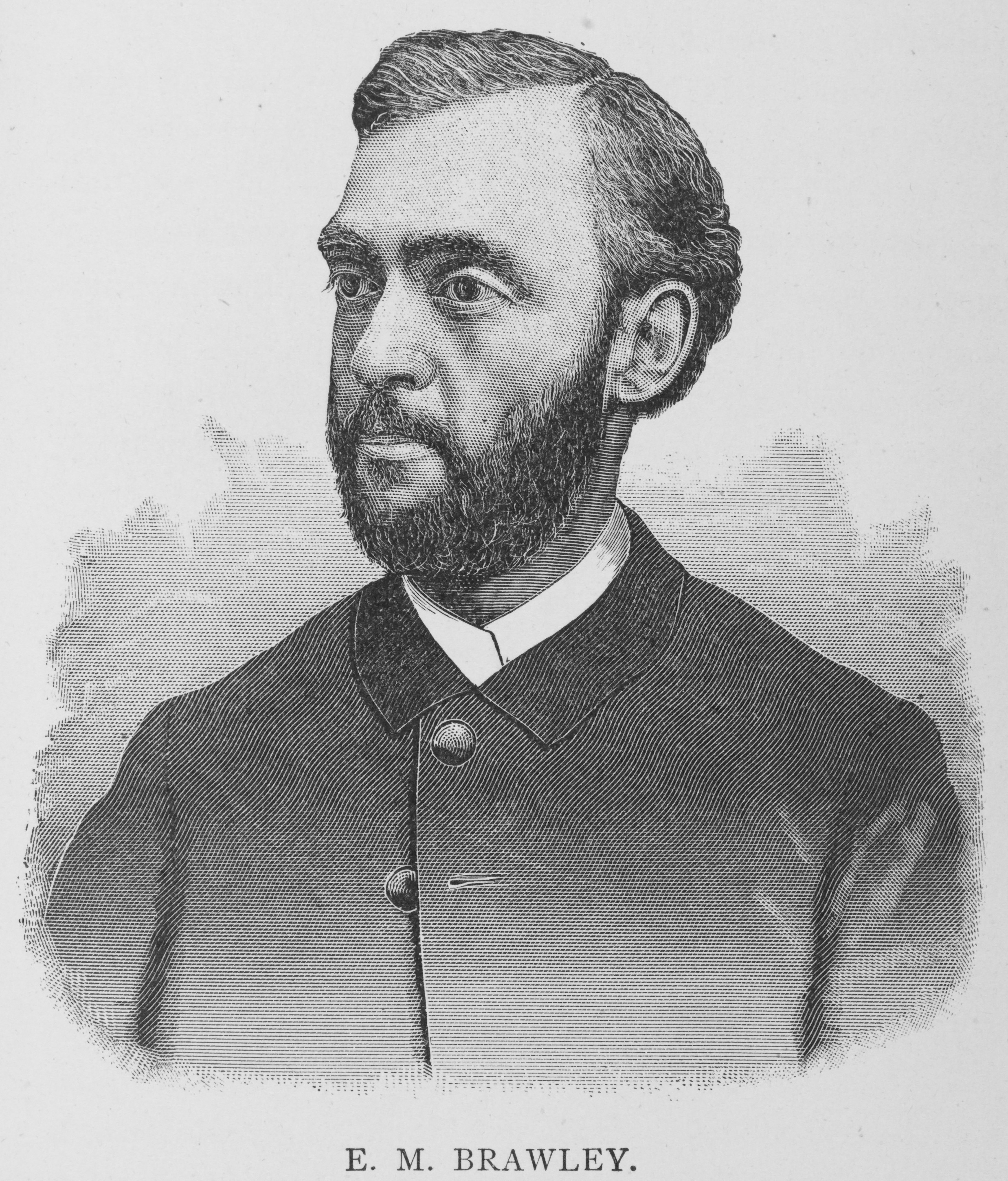
- Brawley in 1887
- Born: March 18, 1851; Charleston, South Carolina, U.S.
- Died: January 13, 1923 (aged 71); Raleigh, North Carolina, U.S.
- Education: Bucknell University
- Occupations: Minister, educator, journalist

Religious life
- Religion: Baptist

Edward McKnight Brawley (March 18, 1851 – January 13, 1923) was an American educator and minister in North Carolina and South Carolina. He was the first African American to attend Bucknell University. He was an important figure in the development of the African-American church in South Carolina and the American southeast and helped found numerous churches and schools, including the Benedict Institute and Morris College. He served as president at Morris and, earlier, at Selma University. Later in his career he was a professor at Shaw University. He was also a prominent pastor at numerous churches and an important figure in civil rights and religious affairs.

== Early life ==
Edward MacKnight Brawley was born a freeman on March 18, 1851, in Charleston, South Carolina. His parents were James M. and Ann L. Vaughn. He began his education about the age of four when a private tutor taught him to read and prepared him for school. He attended school until 1859 or 1860, when his school for black children closed in response to John Brown's raid. In 1861, Brawley's parents sent him to Philadelphia to attend school. He first attended a grammar school, and after three years entered the Institute for Colored Youth led by Ebenezer D. Bassett, where he attended until 1866. In April 1865 he was baptized into the Baptist church and became involved in Sunday Schools and made plans for the ministry. He then returned to Charleston and apprenticed to be a shoemaker in 1869, but in fall 1870 he enrolled at Howard University as the schools first regularly enrolled theology student. After three months he left Howard and in January 1871 he enrolled in the preparatory department of Bucknell University in Lewisburg, Pennsylvania, the schools first African-American student. This move was at the advice of Rev. B. Griffith and Brawley received a scholarship from his wife. He also funded his education through teaching vocal music and preaching during the summers. In the fall he finished his preparation and enrolled in the University, graduating June 30, 1875. He was granted an A. M. from Bucknell in 1878, and an honorary D. D. from Simmons College of Kentucky in May 1885.

== Early religious career ==
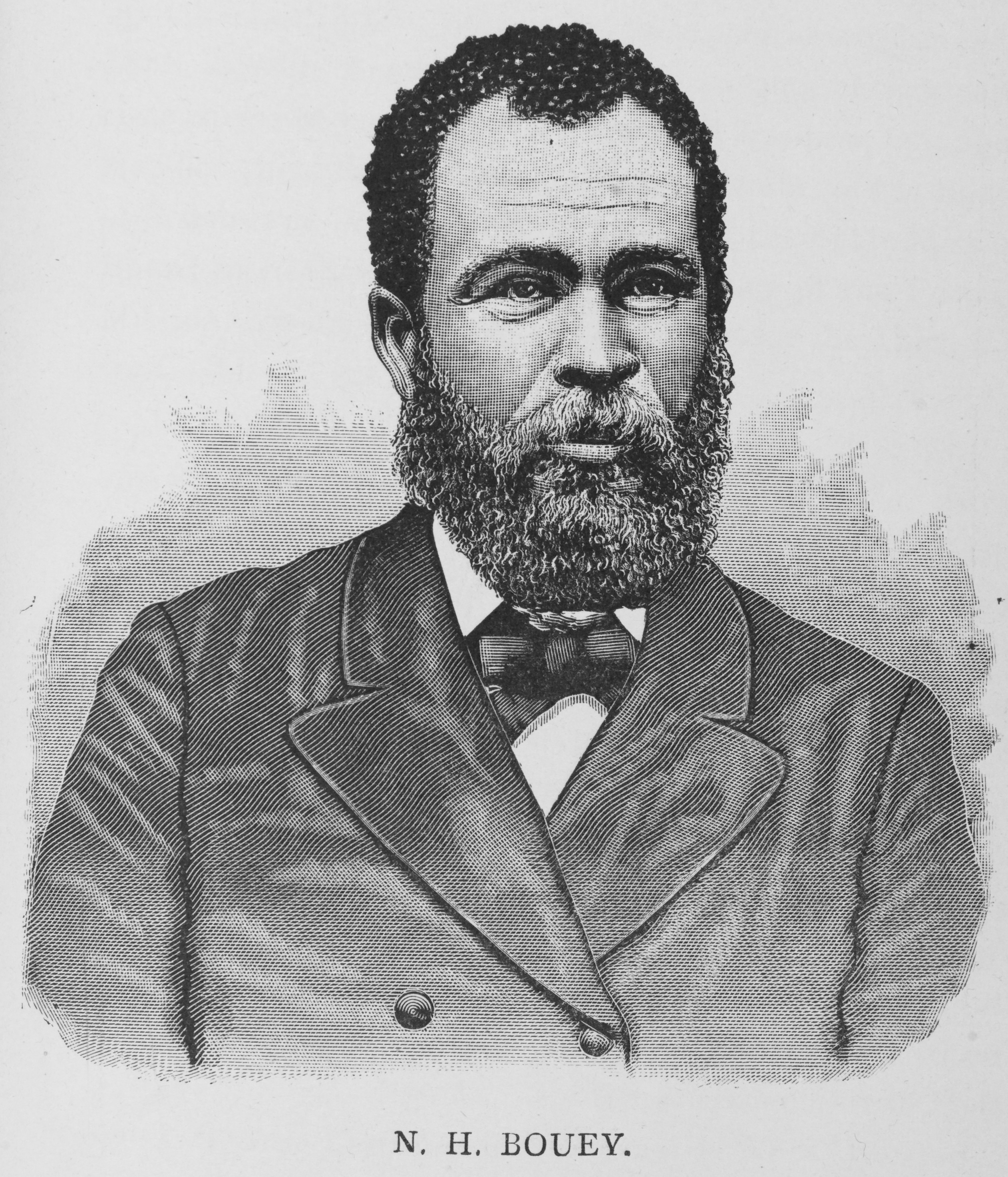
Brawley helped Harrison N. Bouey (pictured) organize missionary work and emigration to Africa in 1877.

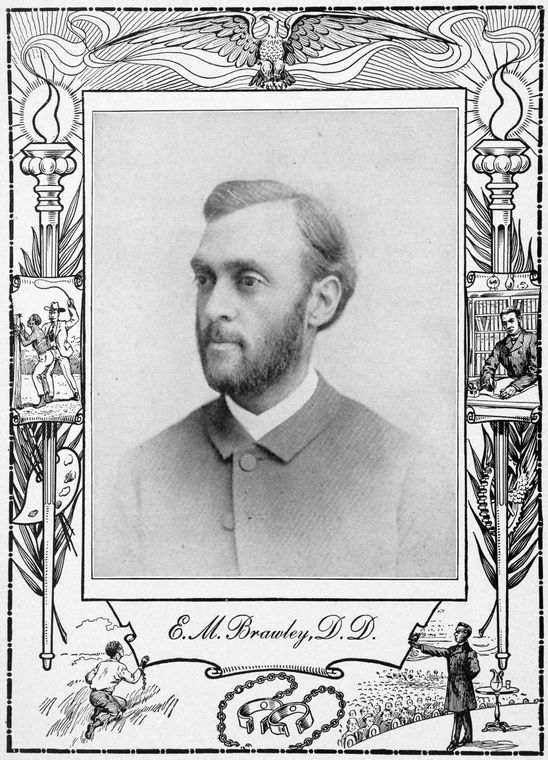
Alternative image of Brawley

In 1873 he was licensed to preach by the white Baptist church in Lewisburg and on July 1, 1875, he was ordained in this church and commissioned by the American Baptist Publication Society as missionary for South Carolina. Finding a lack of Sunday schools in the area, he organized Sunday school organizations and in May 1877, formed these bodies into a state Sunday School Convention, of which he became corresponding secretary and financial agent, working closely with Isaac P. Brockenton. Among his success was securing funding for the Benedict Institute and working to open missions in Africa, which resulted in the notable missionary work of Harrison N. Bouey. During this period and later he was frequently an invited and well-received speaker at the annual national convention of the American Baptist Publication Societies. After eight years, he resigned in ill health and took six months of vacation. During those eight years he helped found 550 Baptist churches in South Carolina with 350 preachers and nearly 100,000 members. In 1882, Brawley clashed with Benedict Institute president Charles E. Becker. Brawley pushed Becker and the institute to hire more black teachers and institute a local board of trustees, challenging Becker's authority.

== Marriage and children ==
In January 1877 he married Mary W. Warrick of Virginia. During that year the couple had a child, but by December both mother and child died. In December 1879 he married Margaret Sophronia Dickerson of Columbia, South Carolina, and the couple had nine children, including Benjamin Griffith Brawley, Mrs. A. R. Stewart, J. Loomis Browley, F. Fustin Brawley, Edgar L. Brawley, and Mrs. L. S. Gaillard.

== Early academic career ==
In October 1883, he succeeded William H. McAlpine in the position of president of Alabama Baptist Normal and Theological School, whose name was changed to Selma University. He was well loved as a president and gave half of his salary to aide poor students. He also founded the Alabama Baptist Women's Convention to provide monetary support to the school. After three years, his second wife's health began to fail and he resigned from Selma and returned to South Carolina. He was succeeded by Charles L. Purce.

== Later religious career ==
In January 1887, he began to publish the weekly paper, the Baptist Tribune and was district secretary for the south for the American Baptist Publication Society, a position he resigned in 1890 to become pastor of the First Baptist Church in Petersburg, Virginia. In 1890 he published a collection of works titled, The Negro Baptist Pulpit: A Collection of Sermons and Papers by Colored Baptist Ministers. The work included 28 essays, including by Mary Virginia Cook Parrish, Richard DeBaptiste, Shortly after he resigned his pastorate to resume work for the Society. In 1899, Bramley was a pastor of a church in Darien, Georgia when the city was hit by a race riot. Bramley was outspoken in calls for peace and in the innocence of the black people imprisoned in the event's aftermath. By 1902, he was Editorial Secretary of the National Baptist Publishing Board.

During his career, he was pastor of many churches, including Tabernacle Baptist Church in Selma, Alabama, Springfield Baptist Church in Greenville, South Carolina, Harrison Street Baptist Church in Palatka, Florida, First Baptist Church in Fernandina, Florida, and White Rock Baptist Church in Durham, North Carolina. He also held aforementioned pastorates in Darien, Georgia and Petersburg, Virginia. His position at White Rock in Durham was from 1912 to 1920. Other than The Negro Baptist Pulpit, he wrote many books, pamphlets and tracts.

== Later academic career ==
In 1908, with the help of Brawley, Morris College was founded in Sumter, South Carolina, and in April 1911, the school was incorporated. Brawley was hired to serve as the school's first president. He was later professor of Evangelism and Old Testament Literature at Shaw University in Raleigh, North Carolina.

== Death and legacy ==
Brawley died on January 13, 1923, in Raleigh, North Carolina, and was buried in Durham, North Carolina. At the time of his death he was a professor at Shaw.

The Brawley-Starks Academic Success Center on the Morris College campus, built in 1932, is named for Brawley and his successor, John J. Starks.

Bucknell currently offers a scholarship named for Brawley.
