= John J. Starks =

American academic administrator

John Jacob Starks
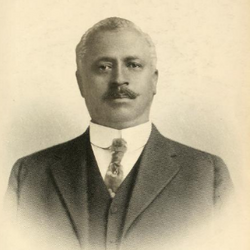

President of Benedict College
- In office 1930–1944
- Preceded by: Clarence B. Antisdel
- Succeeded by: John A. Bacoats

President of Morris College
- In office 1912–1930
- Preceded by: Edward M. Brawley
- Succeeded by: Ira David Pinson

President of Seneca Institute - Seneca Junior College
- In office 1899–1912

Personal details
- Born: April 15, 1872 Ware Shoals, South Carolina, U.S.
- Died: January 4, 1944 (aged 71)
- Occupation: Academic administrator; pastor

John Jacob Starks (April 15, 1872 – January 4, 1944) was the 8th president of Benedict College and the first African-American to hold the position.

== Early life and education ==
Starks was born to enslaved parents in Ware Shoals, South Carolina, in Greenwood County. At age 14, he left home to attend Brewer Normal Institute in Greenwood, making the seventeen mile trip on foot each week, with the support of family friends. Starks enrolled at Benedict College, supporting his education with odd jobs. He decided to pursue a degree in theology, and attended Atlanta Baptist Seminary, now Morehouse College, paying his way by picking cotton.

== Career ==
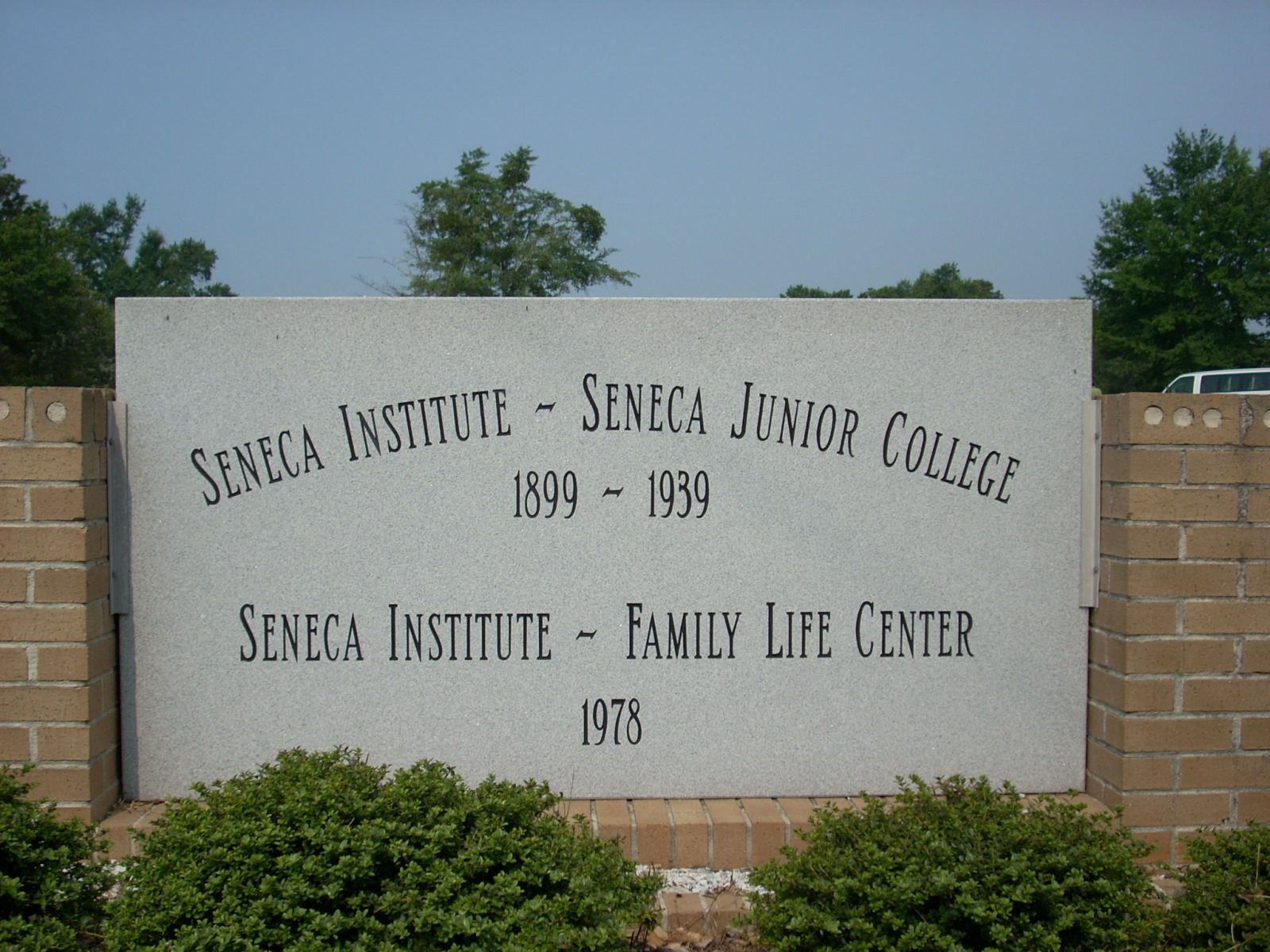
Seneca Institute sign

In 1899, Starks became the first president of Seneca Institute in Seneca, South Carolina.

In 1912, Starks went to Sumter, South Carolina to become the second president of Morris College. He expanded the institution from two buildings to six, and its campus to forty acres, increased enrollment and enhanced its grammar and college programs.

In 1930, Starks returned to Benedict College as its first African-American president. The J.J. Starks School of Theology at Benedict College produced many well-known graduates, including Stewart Cleveland Cureton and Rev. Roscoe C. Wilson, Sr., grandfather of A'ja Wilson.

== Written works ==
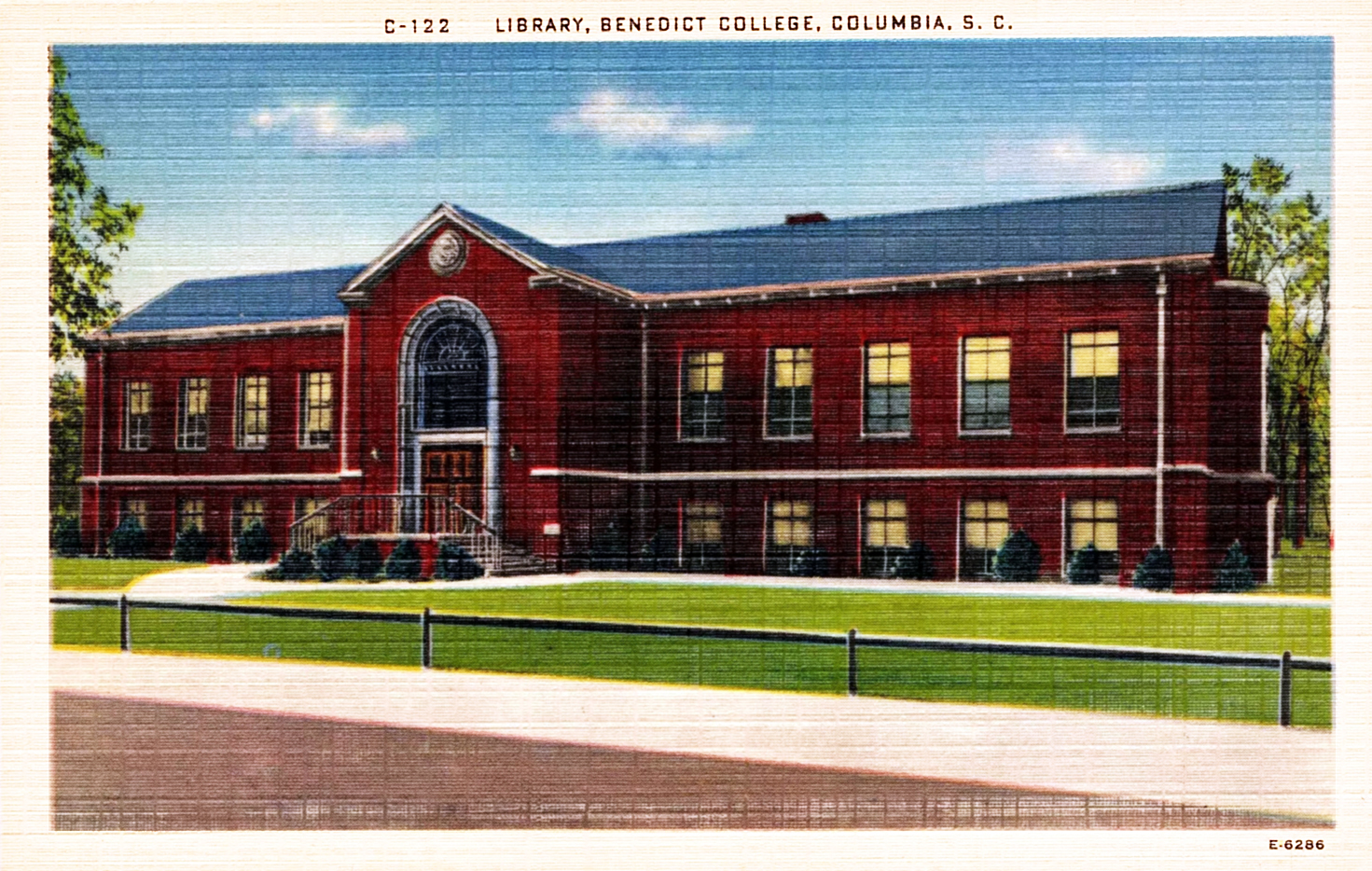
A postcard of Starks Library, Benedict College

In 1941, Starks published "Lo These Many Years: an Autobiographical Sketch".

== Personal life and death ==
Starks married Julia Sherard in 1897. He died at Good Samaritan Waverly Hospital in Columbia, South Carolina on January 4, 1944.

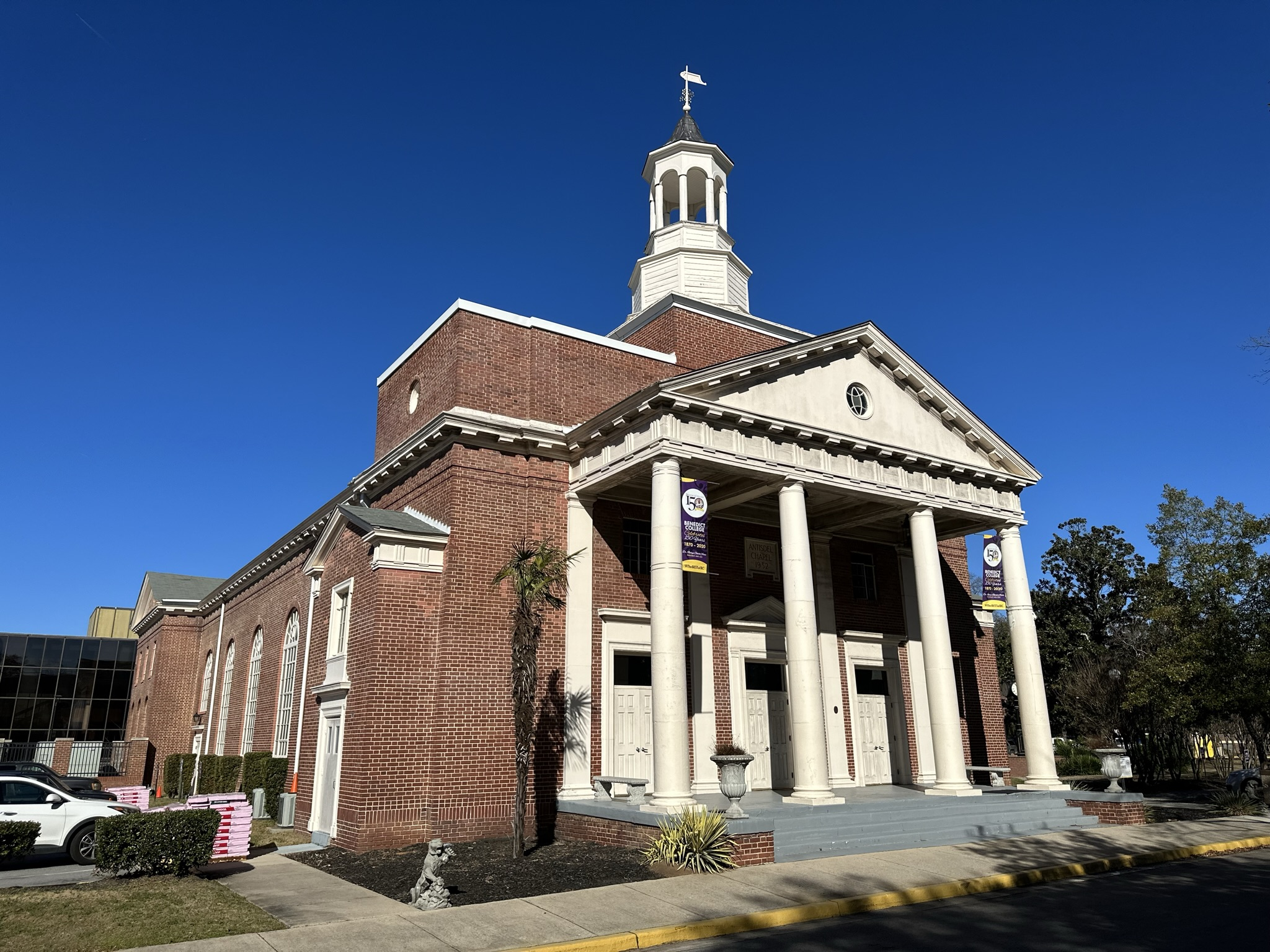
Antisdel Chapel, constructed by Starks during his term as president of Benedict College

== Awards and recognitions ==
- The Brawley-Starks Academic Success Center on the Morris College campus, built in 1932, is named for Starks and his predecessor, Edward M. Brawley.
- In 2020, the Starks Library, one of the original buildings making up the Benedict College Historic District, received federal funding for preservation as the Starks Center.
- Other buildings in the Benedict District include Antisdel Chapel, which Starks had built, Starks Hall, and Duckett Hall.
- During his time as president of Benedict he and his wife lived in what would become the Visanska-Starks House in Columbia. The site was named for him when it received a historical marker.
