= Morris College =

Historically black private college in Sumter, South Carolina, US

- Motto: "Intrare Libris, Dispartire Servire"
- Motto in English: "Enter to Learn, Depart to Serve"
- Type: Private historically black college
- Established: 1908
- Religious affiliation: Baptist Educational and Missionary Convention of South Carolina
- Students: 421
- Location: Sumter, South Carolina, U.S. 33.9383°N 80.3457°W
- Campus: 33 acres (13.4 ha), 24 buildings
- Colors: Blue & Gold
- Nickname: MoCo
- Sporting affiliations: NAIA – Continental
- Mascot: Hornets
- Website: www.morris.edu

Morris College (MC) is a private, Baptist historically black college in Sumter, South Carolina. It was founded and is operated by the Baptist Educational and Missionary Convention of South Carolina.

== History ==
Morris College was founded in 1908 by Jacob J. Durham, initially as grade school, high school, and college. The college is named after Frank Morris, a leader of the African American community of South Carolina. The college's first president was Edward M. Brawley (1908–1912). Morris College awarded its first bachelor's degree in 1915 under the administration of the college's second president John J. Starks. The college's third president was Ira David Pinson, who steered the college to expansion during the Great Depression. The college's fourth president was James P. Garrick, who served from 1930 until 1946. During his tenure, the Department of Religion developed a series of courses called the "Standard Leadership Curriculum". From 1946 until 1948, Henry H. Butler was the college's fifth president; he held the presidency of the Baptist Convention at the same time. While he was president, the library project was finished and he helped accumulate over $90,00.00 to the college's credit. The sixth president (acting), Jeff W. Boykin who served in 1948 when the School of Religion became a separate entity from the college. At the age of thirty, Odell Richardson Reuben became the seventh president of Morris College. Reuben was the first African American to earn a Doctor of Religion from Duke University. In 1960-1961, the total enrollment increased to 898. The college's eighth president, Henry E. Hardin, served in 1972 and 1973.

The college's ninth president, Luns C. Richardson, who served from 1974 to July 2017, was the college's longest serving president. Under his leadership, $450,000.00 deficit was eliminated in three years. During his tenure the college was also accredited and enrollment increased.

Richardson was succeeded by Leroy Staggers who became the college's tenth president and served from July 2017 to July 2024.

In 2023, Morris College received funding from the National Trust for Historic Preservation's African American Cultural Heritage Action Fund to create plans for preserving the school's historic buildings, some of which date back to 1924.

== Academics ==
Morris College offers bachelor's degrees in 20 areas of study. The college is accredited by the Southern Association of Colleges and Schools to award four different types of bachelor's degrees: Bachelor of Arts, Bachelor of Fine Arts, Bachelor of Science, and Bachelor of Science in Education. These academic programs are organized into five academic divisions.

== Greek letter organizations ==
Morris College currently has chapters for eight of the nine National Pan-Hellenic Council organizations.

== Athletics ==
The Morris athletics teams are called the Hornets. The college is a member of the National Association of Intercollegiate Athletics (NAIA), primarily competing as an independent within the Continental Athletic Conference since the 2005–06 academic year. The Hornets previously competed in the defunct Eastern Intercollegiate Athletic Conference (EIAC) from 1983–84 to 2004–05 (when the conference dissolved).

Morris competes in six intercollegiate varsity sports: Men's sports include baseball, basketball and track & field; while women's sports include basketball, softball and volleyball.

== Notable alumni ==
- Laura Hall (graduated 1965) - politician; member of the Alabama House of Representatives
- Arthenia J. Bates Millican (graduated 1941) - educator and author
- J. David Weeks (graduated 1975) - politician; member of the South Carolina House of Representatives

== See also ==
- List of historically black colleges of the United States
