= Benjamin F. Payton =

African-American academic administrator

President of Tuskegee University
- In office 1981–2010
- Preceded by: Luther H. Foster Jr.
- Succeeded by: Charlotte P. Morris

President of Benedict College
- In office 1967–1972
- Preceded by: John A. Bacoats
- Succeeded by: Henry Ponder

Personal details
- Born: December 27, 1932 Orangeburg, South Carolina, U.S.
- Died: September 28, 2016 (aged 83) Estero, Florida, U.S.
- Education: South Carolina State University; Harvard University; Columbia University; Yale University

Benjamin F. Payton (December 27, 1932 - September 28, 2016) was an African-American academic administrator. He served as the president of two historically black universities: Benedict College in Columbia, South Carolina from 1967 to 1972 and Tuskegee University in Tuskegee, Alabama from 1981 to 2010.

== Early life ==
Payton was born on December 27, 1932, in Orangeburg, South Carolina. He had a brother Dr. Cecil W. Payton who later worked as executive assistant to the president of Morgan State University.

Payton graduated from South Carolina State University, where he earned a bachelor's degree, followed by another bachelor's degree from Harvard University, a master's degree from Columbia University and a PhD from Yale University.

== Career ==
Payton served as the president of Benedict College from 1967 to 1972. He worked for the Ford Foundation for the next nine years.

Payton served as the president of Tuskegee University from 1981 to 2010. During his tenure, he raised $240 million. His other accomplishments included "creating five colleges, launching the school's first doctoral programs, a continuing education program and centers for aerospace science and health education." It was also thanks to his leadership that President Bill Clinton issued an apology to the university for the Tuskegee syphilis experiment in 1997.

Payton served on the boards of directors of AmSouth Bancorporation ITT Inc., the Liberty Corporation, Praxair, and Ruby Tuesday.

Payton was a charter member of the Epsilon Nu Boulé chapter of Sigma Pi Phi in Naples, Florida.
