= Jacob J. Durham =

African American minister (1849–1920)

Jacob Javan Durham
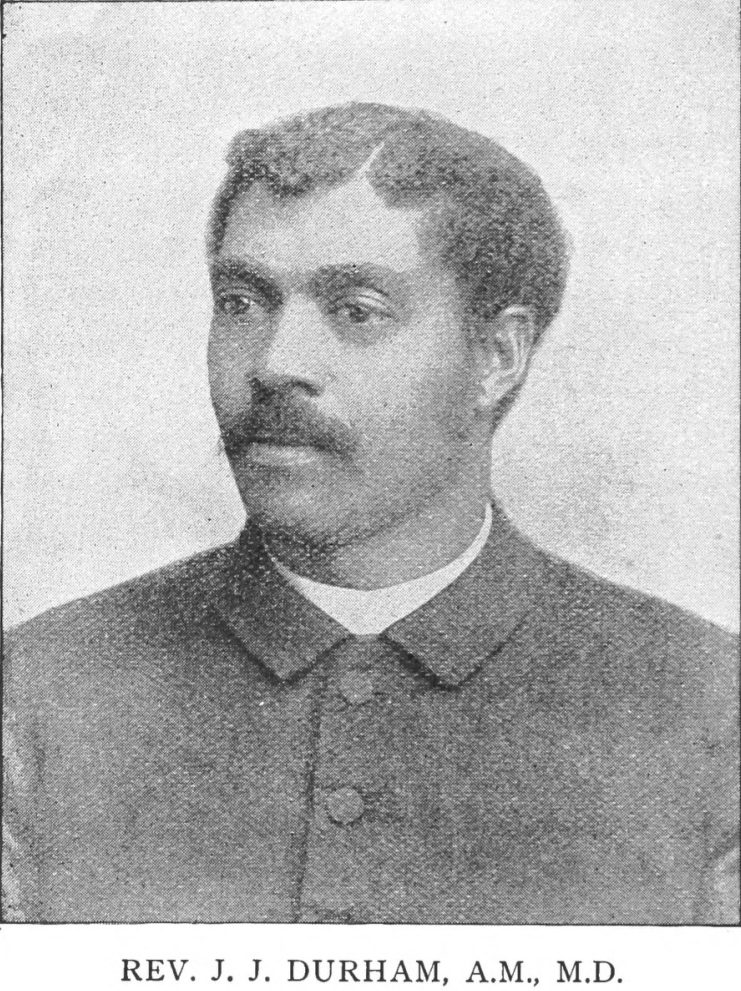
- Durham in 1892
- Born: April 13, 1849; Woodruff, South Carolina, U.S.
- Died: December 11, 1920 (aged 71); Columbia, South Carolina, U.S.
- Education: Fisk University, Meharry Medical College
- Occupations: Minister, educator, debater, orator
- Political party: Republican

Jacob Javan Durham (April 14, 1849 – December 11, 1920) was an American minister, educator, debater and orator, and the founder of a college. He was a Baptist minister in South Carolina, and the founder of Morris College in 1908. He was a member of the board at Morehouse College and an officer in state and national Baptist conventions.

== Early life and education ==
Jacob Javan Durham was born to James W. Durham and Dorcas Durham on April 13, 1849, near Woodruff, South Carolina in Spartanburg County. He and his mother were slaves of his father. At about the age of ten, they moved to a farm near Cashville, South Carolina where he worked until he was aged fifteen. At that point he was apprenticed to the blacksmith's trade which lasted until 1870. In July, 1867 he converted to the Baptist denomination and joined the Pilgrim Baptist Church in Greenville County and later that year was licensed to preach. In June 1868 he was ordained and made pastor of Foster Chapel in Spartanburg County fifteen miles from his home. He held the pastorate for eighteen months when he resigned and attended a school in Greenville Court House, continuing to work on Saturday's and during the summers. During the summer of 1873 he took courses in Latin and Algebra and entered the senior preparatory class for South Carolina College, failing to gain entrance to the Freshman class of the school. He took a job teaching the next summer and in October 1874 he entered the freshman class with a scholarship and some financial support from his father. When the State government became democratic, funding to the school was dropped, and in the spring of 1877, South Carolina College closed. In October 1877 he entered the Junior class of Atlanta University in Atlanta, Georgia. In May 1879 he left Atlanta University and in March 1880 he enrolled at Fisk University where he graduated with an A. B. in May.

After graduation he took the pastorate at a small church in Columbia, South Carolina. Recognizing a need, he enrolled at Meharry Medical College in Nashville, Tennessee in October 1880, graduating valedictorian with a M.D. in March 1882. In May 1885 he received an A. M. from Fisk.

== Career ==
He returned to Columbia, but a short time later he transferred to Bethseda Church at Society Hill, South Carolina, one of the largest churches in the state. He also opened a large and successful medical practice. In October 1883, Durham was appointed by the American Baptist Publication Society to lead the groups efforts in South Carolina. He was also elected corresponding secretary and financial agent of the Baptist Education Missionary and Sunday School Convention in South Carolina. The increase in responsibility forced him to resign his pastorate and medical practice. He held the position of financial agent for eight years, at which point he moved to Savannah, Georgia to take the pastorate at the Second Baptist Church there. In September 1900 he was chair of the National Baptist Convention and was elected vice-president. From 1905-1920, he was elected president the state Baptist Convention.

=== University administration ===
In 1901, Durham became a member of the Board at Morehouse College. In 1907, Durham pioneered the project to create a Baptist college in South Carolina. Durham was made chairman of the Board of Trustees and did substantial work to fundraiser for the creation of Morris College in Sumter, South Carolina, which opened in 1908. By 1909 he had moved to a position as pastor of Friendship Baptist Church in Aiken, South Carolina.

=== Orator ===
Durham was a powerful speaker and spoke strongly for the cause of civil rights for African Americans and against lynchings. During World War I, Durham supported allowing African Americans to serve in the Army at all service levels. After a speech given in the spring of 1901, in front of President William McKinley in Savannah, McKinley told Durham, "That was one of the most beautiful and eloquent addresses I ever heard". A pamphlet of sermons and speeches by Durham titled, "The Hand of God in the Affairs of Nations" was published in 1909.

== Death ==
Durham died in Columbus, South Carolina on December 11, 1920 of heart disease.
