= Arthenia J. Bates Millican =

American writer and educator (1920–2012)

- Born: Arthenia Jackson; June 1, 1920; Sumter, South Carolina, U.S.
- Died: December 13, 2012 (aged 92); Sumter, South Carolina, U.S.
- Education: Morris College (BA); Clark Atlanta University (MA); Louisiana State University (PhD)
- Occupations: Poet, short-story writer, essayist, educator
- Writing career
- Notable work: Seeds Beneath the Snow (1969)
- Website: millicanarts.org/home

Arthenia J. Bates Millican (June 1, 1920 – December 13, 2012) was an American poet, short-story writer, essayist, and educator whose published writings include the books Seeds Beneath the Snow (1969), The Deity Nodded (1973), and Such Things from the Valley (1977).

== Biography ==
=== Early years and education ===
She was born as Arthenia Jackson in Sumter, South Carolina, to Baptist minister Calvin S. Jackson and his second wife, Susan Emma David Jackson.

Encouraged by her father to write, Arthenia published her first poem, "Christmastide", in The Sumter Daily Item when she was 16 years old, while she was attending Lincoln High School (1934–37). She went on to earn a BA degree in English from Morris College (1941) and a master's degree in 1948 from Clark Atlanta University, where she studied under Langston Hughes, participating in a creative writing workshop that he led and becoming his protégée. In 1972, she became only the second Black woman to earn a PhD in English from Louisiana State University, with a thesis on James Weldon Johnson entitled "In Quest of an Afro-Centric Tradition for Black American Literature."

=== Career and later life ===
She began teaching in South Carolina's public school system in the early 1940s, first at Westside High in Kershaw (1942–45), then at Butler High School in Hartsville (1945–46). From 1947 to 1949 she was chair of the English Department at her alma mater, Morris College in Sumter.

Moving to Halifax, Virginia, she married her first husband, Noah Bates (they subsequently divorced), and taught English from 1949 to 1955 at Mary Bethune High School. For a year, she had a post as an English instructor at Mississippi Valley State, then from 1956 to 1974 worked in the English Department at Southern University in Baton Rouge, rising to the position of professor. During this time, she married her second husband, Wilbur Millican, and received critical acclaim for her writing, which appeared in such publications as National Poetry Anthology, Negro American Literature Forum, Scriptiana, The Negro Digest, The Last Cookie, and Obsidian, as well as in three books – two collections of short stories and a novel.

In 1976, she received a National Endowment of the Arts fellowship for her short story "Where You Belong".

After retiring from teaching in 1980, Millican continued to write and undertake public speaking.

She died on December 13, 2012, aged 92.

== Critical reception ==
The South Carolina Academy of Authors has noted: "By the time of the publication of her premier short-story collection, SEEDS BENEATH THE SNOW (1969), her work was being compared to that of Paul Laurence Dunbar, Zora Neale Hurston, and Thomas Hardy. In her convincing local-color narratives—by turns disturbing, touching, humorous--of the daily lives and strivings of rural and small-town African-Americans in the South, Millican was hailed as following in the tradition of Hurston, Richard Wright, Ernest J. Gaines, and Alice Walker."

She was described by poet Nikky Finney as "a brilliant scholar of African American Literature ... utterly incredibly brilliant."

== Personal life ==
Millican had four brothers, Calvin Jackson, Edward G. Jackson, Graydon Jackson and Leon Jackson, and three sisters, Catherine Alia, Victoria Jackson Barr Brunson, and Susan E. Jones.

== Legacy ==
Her family established the AJBM Literary Foundation in 2008, with her nephew Rick Jones as executive director, to recognize and preserve the contributions and legacy of Arthenia Jackson Bates Millican, with goals that include building "literary, and arts and culture appreciation across generations". In 2025, it was announced that the AJBM Literary Foundation was rebranding as the Millican Arts Foundation.

Millican's 1912 home was designated a South Carolina Literary Landmark on June 1, 2019.

A permanent collection of her papers is housed at the University of South Carolina's South Caroliniana Library.

Millican was posthumously inducted into the South Carolina Academy of Authors in April 2017. Her 1993 essay "The Autobiography of an Idea" is included in the 2019 anthology New Daughters of Africa, edited by Margaret Busby.

== Selected bibliography ==
=== Books ===
- Seeds Beneath the Snow (short stories), New York: Greenwich, 1969; 1975
- The Deity Nodded (novel), Detroit: Harlo, 1973
- Such Things from the Valley (short stories), Norfolk, VA: Millican, 1977
- The Bottoms and Hills: Virginia Tales (short stories), Warrenton, VA: Propertius Press, 2019

=== Thesis ===
- "The Autobiography of an Idea". African American Review. 27 (1): 25ff. Spring 1993. Archived from the original on 2015-10-12 – via Questia.

=== Short stories ===
- "A Note from Cell Thirty-three", in New Orleans Review, Vol. 15, No. 1, Spring 1988, pp. 48–52.
