= John A. Bacoats =

American academic administrator

John Alvin Bacoats
- John A. Bacoats, as a Virginia Union graduate, in a 1919 edition of The Crisis magazine

President of Benedict College
- In office 1944–1965
- Preceded by: John J. Starks
- Succeeded by: Benjamin F. Payton

Personal details
- Born: October 10, 1891 Louisiana, US
- Died: September 25, 1965 (aged 73)
- Occupation: Academic administrator; pastor

John Alvin Bacoats (October 10, 1891 - September 25, 1965) was the 9th president of Benedict College.

== Early, education and career ==
Bacoats graduated from Oberlin College in 1929. He graduated from Virginia Union University with a DD degree and from Bishop College with an LLD.

In 1920 Bacoats became principal of Fredericksburg Normal and Industrial Institute in Fredericksburg, Virginia and minister of Fredericks Hall.

Bacoats became president of Leland College in Baton Rouge, Louisiana in 1929. In 1942 he resigned to become vice-president at Benedict College, becoming president upon the death of John J. Starks in 1944.

Benedict expanded in physical size, enrollment and annual budget during these years, and was admitted to the Southern Association of Colleges and Schools in 1961.

Bacoats' sentiments were among those published by the Negro History Bulletin when Charles R. Drew died in 1950.

Bacoats memberships included First Calvary Baptist Church, the Mayor's Committee on Human Relations and the South Carolina Council on Human Relations. He was an executive board member of the National Baptist Convention, the United Negro College Fund, the Southern Regional Council and the Baptist Educational and Missionary Convention of South Carolina.

== Written works ==
Bacoats' life was the subject of a biography entitled, "Echoes from a Well-spent Life: A Biography of John Alvin Bacoats and Eight Addresses".

== Personal life and death ==
Bacoats married Inez Combs in 1923. He died in September 1965.
