= James T. Haley =

American writer, editor, and publisher

James T. Haley was an American writer, editor, and publisher. His Afro-American Encyclopaedia is an encyclopedia for and about African Americans in the late 19th and early 20th centuries and was among the first works documenting African American history in encyclopedic form.

== Afro-American Encyclopaedia ==
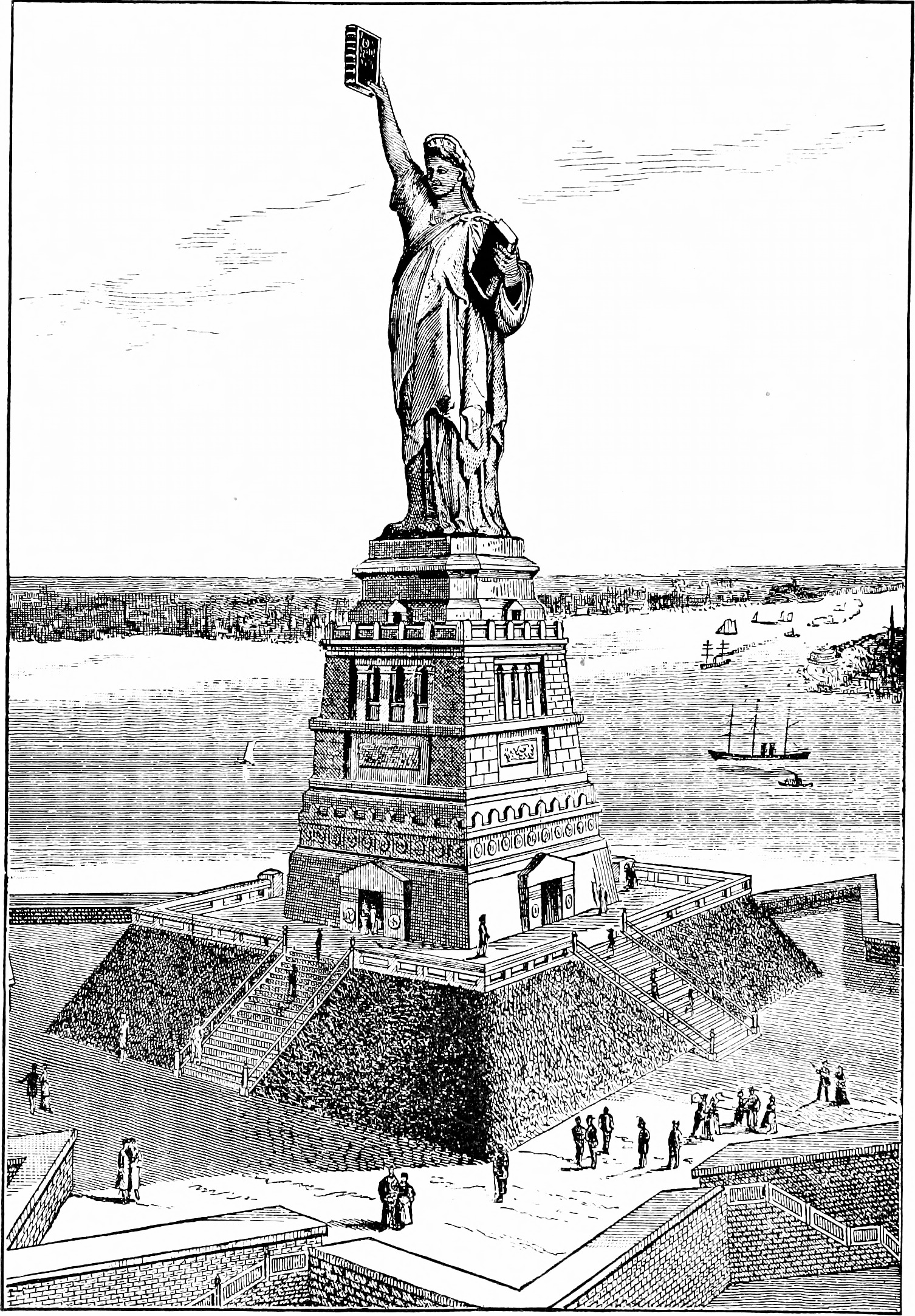
Title page to the Afro-American Encyclopaedia

Haley's Afro-American Encyclopaedia is now regarded as a "classic historical encyclopedia". Illustrated throughout, the encyclopedia was first published in Nashville, Tennessee by Haley & Florida. The encyclopedia included images of Sissieretta Jones, Mary Rice Phelps, and Clarissa Thompson, as well as buildings such as Dr. Robert Fulton Boyd's residence in Nashville and Preston Taylor's residence. Booker T. Washington and Rev. George Washington Dupree, a preacher, also appear in the encyclopedia.

== Other works ==
His other works include Sparkling Gems of Race Knowledge Worth Reading, a compendium of talks and essays. The book "emphasize[d] a sense of community through point-counterpoints on language used by the African American community and editorials describing successful African Americans."

Haley later set up his own publishing company, J. T. Haley Publishing Co., and self-published his work thereafter. The publication of Sparkling Gems may have been arranged to coincide with the Tennessee Centennial and International Exposition.

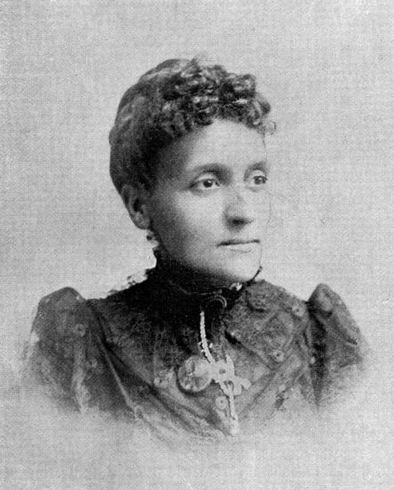
Image of Mary A. McCurdy from Sparkling Gems

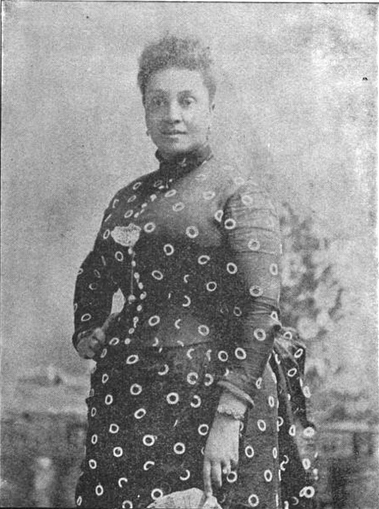
Georgia Gordon Taylor

Mary A. McCurdy contributed an introduction and essays to Haley's works. Sparkling Gems includes an image of restaurateur and hotelier Georgia Gordon Taylor. Haley published William Councill's illustrated cultural history book Lamp of Wisdom; or Race History Illustrated in 1898.

== Bibliography ==
- Afro-American Encyclopaedia, or, The thoughts, doings, and sayings of the race, embracing addresses, lectures, biographical sketches, sermons, poems, names of universities, colleges, seminaries, newspapers, books, and a history of the denominations, giving the numerical strength of each. Nashville, Tennessee: Haley & Florida (1895). With introduction by Mary A. McCurdy. (Access to online version via Documenting the American South)
- Sparkling Gems of Race Knowledge Worth Reading: A Compendium of Valuable Information and Wise Suggestions that Will Inspire Noble Effort at the Hands of Every Race-loving Man, Woman, and Child (1897). With introduction by Mary A. McCurdy.
- From darkness into light, or, Bible mysteries unfolded, Nashville, J. T. Haley Publishing Co. (1911).
