= Charles L. Purce =

American educator and academic administrator

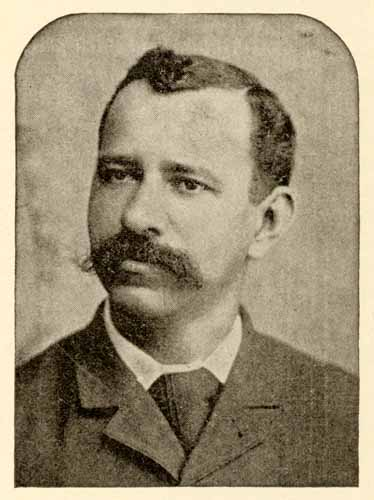

President of Selma University
- In office 1886–1893
- Preceded by: Edward M. Brawley
- Succeeded by: William T. Amiger

President of State University at Louisville
- In office 1894–1905
- Preceded by: William J. Simmons

Personal details
- Born: July 4, 1856 Charleston, South Carolina, U.S.
- Died: August 7, 1905 (aged 49) Louisville, Kentucky, U.S.
- Education: Benedict College, Richmond Theological Institute, Shaw University, Simmons College of Kentucky
- Occupation: Educator, academic administrator

Charles L. Purce (July 4, 1856 – August 7, 1905) was an American educator and academic administrator, active in Louisville, Kentucky, and Selma, Alabama. He was a leader in the Baptist church, and served as president of Selma University and Simmons College of Kentucky, both Baptist institutions.

== Early life ==
Charles L. Purce was born on July 4, 1856, to Ellen and William Purce in Charleston, South Carolina. He was educated at public and private schools and attended high school in Charleston. He converted to the Baptist religion in 1875 and attended the Benedict Institute in Columbia, South Carolina, in 1878 and 1879 and graduated from the Richmond Seminary in 1883. He next became pastor of a church at Society Hill, South Carolina. He was married in Philadelphia on January 7, 1885, and had at least one child. He received an A. B. from Shaw University and a D. D. from the State University at Louisville.

== Academic career ==
In November 1886, he left his position as pastor to take the chair of Greek and Latin at Selma University at Selma, Alabama. The same year he succeeded Edward M. Brawley as president at Selma University upon the unanimous vote of the university board and unanimous endorsement of the General Convention of Baptists of the state of Alabama. He served as president until 1893. He also was the general missionary of the American Baptist Home Mission Society of New York for Alabama. During this time he supported the role of white dominated Baptist leadership against a push for separate white and black societies. Among his important services to Selma was the paying off of a debt of $8,000 the university owed. In 1894, he accepted the presidency of Simmons College of Kentucky, then known as the State University at Louisville, succeeding William J. Simmons. In 1901 he was nominated again to the presidency of Selma University, a move which was opposed by the American Baptist a journal in Louisville, and Purce remained in Louisville.

== Death ==
Purce died August 7, 1905, after three days of illness.
