= Mary Rice Phelps =

American teacher and writer

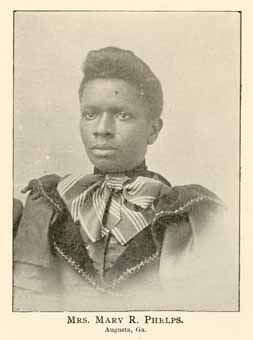
- Born: Mary Rice; May 1, 1867; Union County, SC
- Died: October 9, 1931; Keysville, GA
- Education: Scotia Seminary, 1885
- Occupations: teacher and writer
- Spouse: John L. Phelps

Mary Rice Phelps (born May 1, 1867) was an African-American teacher and writer. She began her teaching career at thirteen years old.

== Biography ==
Mary Rice was born on May 1, 1867, in Union County, South Carolina, to Adeline and Hilliard Rice. She learned to read by the time she was four years old, and she began school at five.

At thirteen, Rice was asked to take charge of a large school in Spartanburg County, South Carolina. With her parents' permission, she took the teachers examination and received her teaching certificate. After one year of running the school, Rice's parents sent her to the Benedict Institute in Columbia, South Carolina, to continue her own education. She entered Scotia Seminary in Concord, North Carolina, in 1881 and graduated in 1885.

Rice then served as principal of public schools in Glenn Springs, South Carolina, for three years. In 1890, she was elected to be assistant principal of the Eddy School in Milledgeville, Georgia.

On October 25, 1891, Rice married John L. Phelps in Helena, South Carolina. In 1893, Mary Rice Phelps was elected assistant principal of Cleveland Academy in Helena, but she left within a year to accept a position at the Haines Industrial School in Augusta, Georgia. In addition to teaching during school terms, Phelps used her vacations to teach rural children.

Phelps was also known as an accomplished writer, and James T. Haley included her essay "The Responsibility of Women as Teachers" in his Afro-American Encyclopaedia (1895). In the essay, Phelps encouraged mothers to think of themselves as their children's first teachers and thus to teach their children morality from an early age.

Phelps died on October 9, 1931, at 64 years of age in Keysville, Burke County, Georgia. She and her husband, John Phelps, are buried at Cedar Grove Cemetery in Augusta, Georgia.
