= William H. McAlpine =

American minister and educator (1847–1905)

- Born: June , 1847; Buckingham County, Virginia, U.S.
- Died: November 3, 1905 (aged 58); Selma, Alabama, United States
- Occupations: Minister, educator

Religious life
- Religion: Baptist

William H. McAlpine (June 1847 - November 3, 1905) was a Baptist minister and educator in Alabama. He was a founder and the second president of Selma University. He was a leader in the Baptist church and a founder and president of the Baptist Foreign Mission Convention. Later in his life he was Dean of the Theological Department at Selma.

== Early life ==
William H. McAlpine was born into slavery in Buckingham County, Virginia near Farmersville in June 1847. About the age of three he, his mother, and his younger brother was sold to Robert McAlpine in Coosa County, Alabama. He never knew his father. In 1855, Robert McAlpine died and his property dispersed, with William separated from his mother and moved to Talladega County, Alabama. He would not again see his mother until 1874. His new owner, Augustus McAlpine, was a doctor, and William remained with the family until the end of the American Civil War in 1865. As a child, William worked for his owner as a nurse and thus stayed close to the house. Here he was able to receive a basic education in the company with white children who were taught at home, and learned to read and write.

== Career ==
In 1864 he converted to the Baptist religion and joined a white church in Talladega. In 1866, finally as a free man, he took work as a carpenter and entered Talladega College, working evenings and weekends. His career forced him to leave the school in 1874, six months before he would have graduated. In 1868 he attended his first convention of the Colored Baptist Missionary Society of Alabama, which he continued to attend in the future. In 1869 he was licensed to preach and in 1871 he became pastor of a black church in Talladega and he helped the church erect its first building. He then took a pastorship at a church in Jacksonville, Alabama, and he also taught public schools there. Further, he helped organize several Baptist associations in North Alabama.

In November 1873, the State Colored Baptist Missionary convention met in Tuscaloosa, Alabama, where McAlpine presented a resolution to establish a University, which would become Selma University. A concurrent white convention recommended the black Baptists give the money they had raised for the university to their care and not to undertake the project alone, but McAlpine convinced the convention that it should not follow the advice of the white group and to establish the institution themselves. McAlpine was selected at the 1874 convention in Mobile, Alabama, to travel throughout the state to raise money for the school, and again at the 1875 convention. At the 1874 convention, a board of trustees was elected for the body consisting of McAlpine, Holland Thompson, Henry J. Europe, Charles Octavia Boothe, and Alexander Butler. In 1877 he took charge of the Marion Baptist church and he again canvassed the state to raise money. His years of fundraising were a great success. In the fall of that, year the State convention was in Eufaula, where a decision was made to purchase the old Fair Grounds of Selma, Alabama, as the schools location. In 1881, McAlpine was elected to be president of the University, later called Selma University, which he held for two years, after which he resigned so that a more scholarly leader could be selected, and he returned to Marion Baptist church. He was succeeded as president by Rev. Edward M. Brawley.

In 1878 he was chosen as editor of the Baptist Pioneer, a position he held until 1882. In this position, he was also succeeded by Brawley. In 1880 he helped organize and was elected president of the first Baptist Foreign Mission Convention organized in Montgomery, Alabama, serving two sessions. In about 1882 he was selected a member of the Board of Trustees of Lincoln Normal University at Marion, Alabama, where he was the only black member of the board. As a member of the Baptist Foreign Mission Convention in 1895, McAlpine was a member of a committee put forward by Albert W. Pegues to try to unify the group with the American National Baptist Convention and the Baptist National Educational Convention along with Pegues, Andrew J. Stokes, Joseph Endom Jones, Wesley G. Parks, J. H. Frank, A. Hubbs, A. S. Jackson, and Jacob R. Bennett, all from southern states.

== Later life and family ==
McAlpine was widely respected and was a close friend of Tuskegee founder, Booker T. Washington. In 1899, McAlpine became pastor of the Dexter Avenue Baptist Church in Montgomery. He also served as Dean of the Theological Department of Selma University later in his life. In 1905 he attended the National Baptist Convention in Chicago. Shortly after returning, he died on November 3, 1905, of malaria.

One daughter of McAlpine was Ethel, who worked as a high school principal and an instructor at Selma University. Ethel married Nathaniel D. Walker, a prominent physician. One daughter of Ethel and Nathaniel Walker was Eunice Walker, an executive at Johnson Publishing Company and founder of Ebony and Jet magazines.

Another prominent McAlpine, R. B. McAlpine, was born a slave on January 25, 1848, in Coosa County and served many years at the Tuskegee Institute.
