= Jessie P. Guzman =

African-American archivist, historian, and author

- Born: Jessie Parkhurst Guzman; December 1, 1898; Savannah, Georgia
- Died: October 25, 1996 (aged 97); Jacksonville, Florida
- Occupations: Writer, archivist, historian, educator and college administrator

Jessie Parkhurst Guzman (December 1, 1898 – October 25, 1996) was a writer, archivist, historian, educator, and college administrator, primarily at the Tuskegee Institute in Tuskegee, Alabama. In her work at the Tuskegee Institute, particularly in the Department of Research and Records, she documented the lives of African Americans and maintained the Institute's lynching records.

== Personal life and education ==
Guzman was born to David C. and Ella Roberts Parkhurst in Savannah, Georgia. She lived with her godparents, the Wragg family. Reverend Doctor John Percy Wragg was a clergyman who led the American Bible Society's Agency Among the Colored People of the South. After completing her high school education at Atlanta's Clark University in 1915, Guzman attended Howard University where she graduated with an A.B. degree in 1919. She received her M.A. from Columbia University in 1924 and continued her studies at the University of Chicago and American University. In 1940, she married Ignacio L. Guzman, a member of the Tuskegee Institute's faculty.

While in college, she was a member of the sorority group, Alpha Kappa Alpha, in their South Eastern Region. She was part of the Beta Xi Omega Chapter.

She died in Jacksonville, Florida on October 25, 1996.

== Career ==
After working as John Wragg's private secretary, Guzman taught history at New Orleans College from 1922-1923. When she was 24 years old, she began her work at the Tuskegee Institute where she worked for a total of over forty years. From 1923-1929 she worked as a research assistant at the Tuskegee Institute under Monroe Work. She briefly taught at Alabama State Teacher's College during the 1929-1930 academic year and then returned to the Tuskegee Institute where she worked until her retirement in 1965. Working first under Monroe Work and later as director of the Department of Research and Records, Guzman contributed to various research projects and publications. One of her many duties under Work at Tuskegee was to compile lists of lynching victims.

From 1938–1944 Ms. Guzman was the Dean of Women at the Institute, and then in 1946 became the Director of the Department of Records and Research — a successor in her own right to Monroe Work’s legacy. In 1950, she was named the Tuskegee Woman of the Year. She compiled and edited two subsequent volumes of the Negro Year Book in 1947 and 1952.

After 1953, the Race Relations Report replaced the account of lynchings. In an interview, Guzman responded that in those years, “We don’t have any sense of how much lynchings were under-reported.”

== Publications ==
- Negro Year Book (editor, 1947, 1952)
- "The Role of the Black Mammy in the Plantation Household" (Journal of Negro History, 1938)
- "Some Recent Literature By and About Negroes" (Service Magazine, 1947)
- "Lynching⎯Crime" (Negro Year Book: A Review of Events Affecting Negro Life, 1944-1946, 1947)
- "The Social Contributions of the Negro Woman Since 1940" (1948, Negro History Bulletin)
- "Contributions to Negro Life: Establishing and Directing the Department of Records and Research at Tuskegee Institute" (Journal of Negro History, 1949)
- Some Achievements of the Negro Through Education. (Tuskegee, Ala.; Department of Records and Research, Tuskegee Institute, 1951)
- George Washington Carver; a Classified Bibliography. (Tuskegee, Ala.; Department of Records and Research, Tuskegee Institute, 1954)
- "The Social Contributions of the Negro Woman Since 1940"
- Crusade for Civic Democracy: The Story of the Tuskegee Civic Association, 1941-1970 (1983)
