= Bathsheba A. Benedict =

American baptist and philanthropist

Bathsheba Adams Benedict (née Barber; 1809 – 1897) was an American philanthropist and Baptist from Pawtucket, Rhode Island. She was a co-founder, benefactor, and namesake of Benedict College, an historically black college, in South Carolina.

Bathsheba Adams Barber was born in Bellingham, Massachusetts in 1809. In 1830, she married Stephen Benedict, a banker, mill owner, Baptist church deacon, and early abolitionist from Pawtucket. Her husband died in a fire in 1868. Using proceeds from her husband's insurance policy and estate and with a donation from her brother-in-law, Bathsheba Benedict coordinated a donation of several thousand dollars to the American Baptist Home Mission Society to start a Baptist school for freed slaves in the South.

By 1870, Benedict represented the Home Mission Society, and provided the $13,000.00 (~$283,694 in 2024) to purchase a former plantation property in Columbia, South Carolina to use for the school campus, which was named in her honor.

Mrs. Benedict died in 1897 and was buried in the Swan Point Cemetery in Providence, Rhode Island.
