= Mary A. McCurdy =

African-American temperance advocate and suffragist

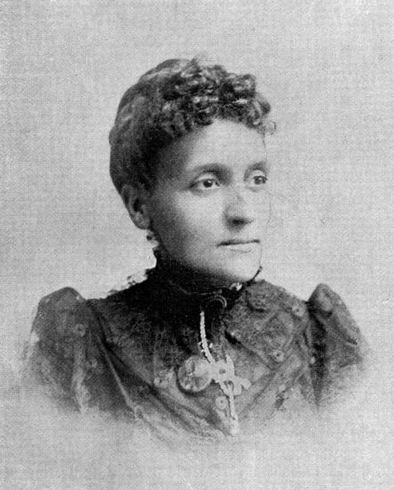
- Martha "Mary" Harris Mason McCurdy, 1897
- Born: Martha A. Harris; August 10, 1852; Carthage, Indiana, U.S.
- Died: June 25, 1934 (aged 81); Indiana, U.S.
- Occupation: Journalist
- Notable work: Duty of the State to the Negro
- Spouses: J.A. Mason; Calvin McCurdy

Martha "Mary" A. Harris Mason McCurdy (August 10, 1852 – June 25, 1934) was an African-American temperance advocate and suffragist. She had a career in journalism that included editing the newspaper "Women's World".

== Biography ==
McCurdy née Harris was born on August 10, 1852, in Carthage, Indiana. In 1875 she married J.A. Mason with whom she had four children. The couple settled in Richmond, Indiana, and, after eight years of marriage, J.A. Mason died. In 1886 McCurdy moved to Atlanta, Georgia in the American south. In 1890 she married Calvin McCurdy, a Presbyterian minister, and the couple moved to Rome, Georgia. The Reverend McCurdy died in 1905, and by 1910 Mary returned to her family in Indiana. She died in June 1934, in Indiana.

== Career ==
McCurdy held a variety of positions in Rome, Georgia including Corresponding Secretary for the Woman's Christian Temperance Union (WCTU) of Georgia, the Superintendent of the Juvenile Work of the Knox Presbytery of the Presbyterian Church, and she was active in the "Rome Branch of the Needle Work Guild of America," which provided clothing for the indigent. McCurdy was the editor of the newspaper "Woman's World." The paper's intended audience was the African-American community and it contained "intellectual, moral and spiritual" material. The paper allowed McCurdy to advance her causes of suffrage and temperance. McCurdy worked with her contemporaries Janie Porter Barrett, and Adella Hunt Logan to advance the cause of suffrage and in particular involve African-American women in the movement.

When McCurdy returned to Indiana she continued her activism in temperance, suffrage, and politics. In 1913 she attended the National Woman's Christian Temperance Union convention, representing Indiana. McCurdy also represented Indiana in the Women's Division of the National Republican Committee.

== Selected works ==
McCurdy's essay on the "Duty of the State to the Negro" appeared in James T. Haley's 1995 anthology Afro-American Encyclopaedia. Her essay on "Intemperance" appeared in Haley's 1897 anthology Sparkling Gems of Race Knowledge Worth Reading: A Compendium of Valuable Information and Wise Suggestions that Will Inspire Noble Effort at the Hands of Every Race-loving Man, Woman, and Child.
