= Selma University =

University in Alabama, US

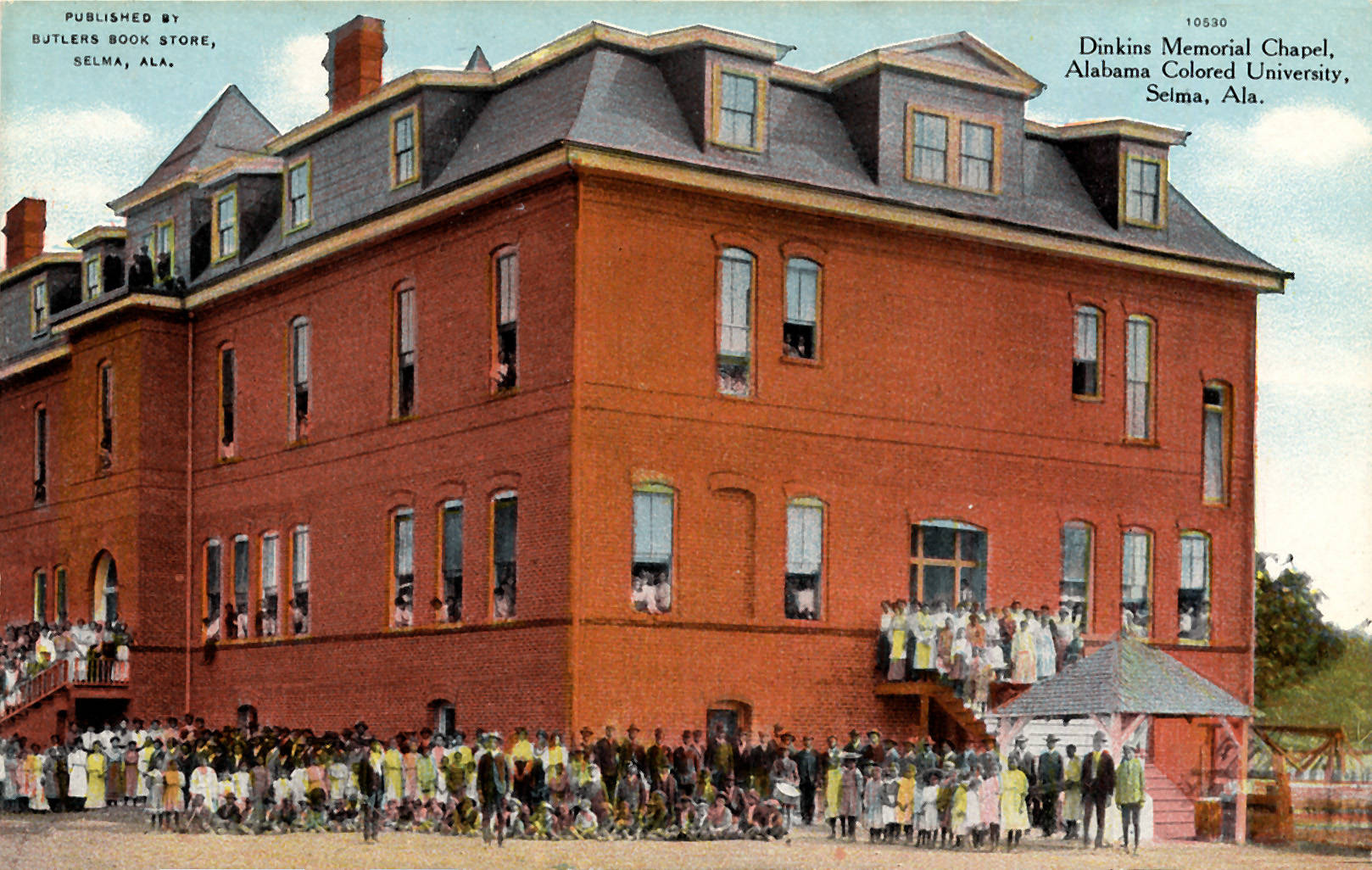
- Former names: Alabama Baptist Normal and Theological School (1878–1908)
- Type: Private, HBCU, Bible college
- Established: 1878; 148 years ago
- Accreditation: ABHE
- Religious affiliation: Alabama State Missionary Baptist Convention
- President: Stanford E. Angion
- Students: 50
- Undergraduates: 31
- Postgraduates: 19
- Location: Selma, Alabama, United States; 32°25′12″N 87°01′55″W
- Colors: Blue and White
- Sporting affiliations: NCCAA
- Website: https://www.selmau.edu/
- Selma University Historic District
- U.S. National Register of Historic Places
- Alabama Register of Landmarks and Heritage
- NRHP reference No.: 100009126

Significant dates
- Added to NRHP: July 14, 2023
- Designated ARLH: June 19, 1997

Selma University is a private historically black Baptist Bible college in Selma, Alabama, U.S.. It is affiliated with the Alabama State Missionary Baptist Convention.

== History ==
The institution was founded in 1878 as the Alabama Baptist Normal and Theological School to train African Americans as ministers and teachers. The school purchased the former Selma Fair Grounds later that same year, moving into the fair's old exposition buildings. Noted ministers such as William H. McAlpine, James A. Foster and R. Murrell were among the founders. At a meeting in Mobile, Alabama in 1874, the first trustees were elected: C. O. Booth, Alexander Butler, William H. McAlpine, Holland Thompson and H. J. Europe. The convention voted to locate the school in Selma in 1877. The school opened four years later in the Saint Phillips Street Baptist Church of Selma (which later became the First Baptist Church).

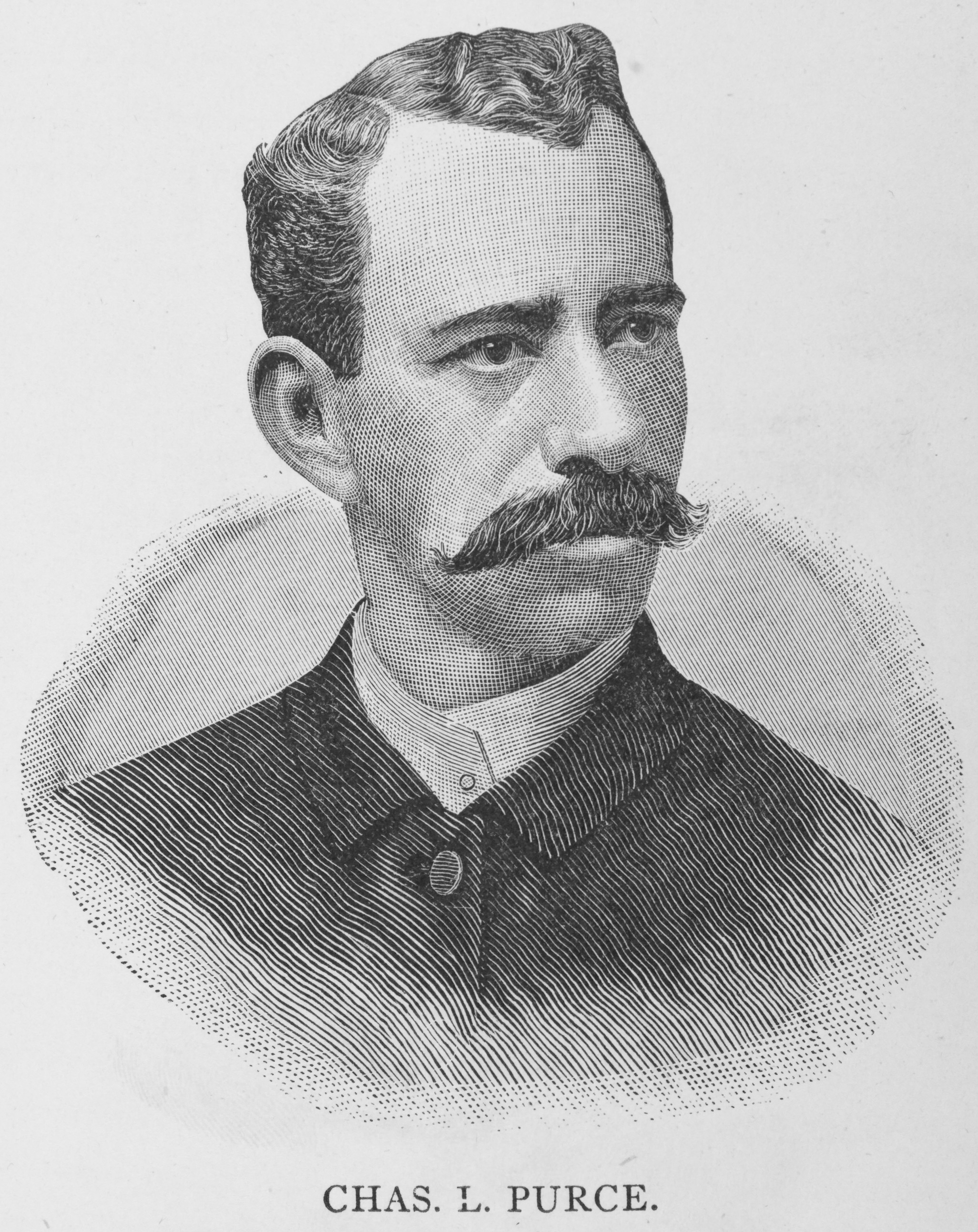
Charles L. Purce was the president of Selma University from 1886 to 1894

In 1881, the school was incorporated by an act of the legislature under the name of Alabama Baptist Normal and Theological School of Selma. In 1886, Charles L. Purce succeeded Edward M. Brawley as president at Selma. Purce was successful as president, and helped the university pay off a debt of $8,000. In 1894, he accepted the presidency of Simmons College of Kentucky, then known as the State University at Louisville

On May 14, 1908, the name was officially changed to Selma University.

In the late 1980s, Selma University developed from a four-year bachelor program in religion and two-year liberal arts program to a four-year institution. However, in the autumn of 2000, Selma University began its transformation from a Christian liberal arts college to a Bible college. In February 2001, Selma University received applicant status, and in February 2005 the school received candidate status with the Commission on Accreditation of the Association for Biblical Higher Education in Orlando, Florida. On February 20, 2009, Selma University received Initial Accreditation from the Commission on Accreditation of the Association for Biblical Higher Education in Canada and the United States.

After receiving full accreditation in 2014, Selma University lost Title IV funding in 2019. The university failed financial responsibility audits in 2016, 2017 and 2018 receiving low composite Title IV financial responsibility scores each year. The university also failed to repay a debt of over $730,000 after defaulting on three payment arrangements agreed on between then university president Dr. Alvin A. Cleveland, vice-president of fiscal affairs Robin Thomas and the department of Education. The Department of Education also cited four IRS tax liens and two State of Alabama tax liens against Selma University as evidence that Selma University was unable to meet its financial responsibility therefore lacking the requisite financial responsibility to administer Title IV and HEA programs.

Selma was also cited for failed administrative capability after allowing their student information system contract to expire without replacement leaving the university unable to adequately record and document student records and financial transactions.

The debt was initially incurred when the university was cited for providing inadequate records on enrolled students and continued to fail to meet the standards required by the department of education in regards to maintaining those records through the 2018–19 school year.

Selma University was notified on February 21, 2020, that it was in violation of six of the Association for Biblical Higher Education's (ABHE) Institutional Accreditation Standards. The school did not request a review or appeal and was placed on probation by the ABHE's Commission on Accreditation, effective March 3, 2020.

Alvin A. Cleveland served as president for more than twenty years, until replaced by Eddie Hill in June 2020. Hill was recruited from outside the university to deal with its financial difficulties. He had been retired for more than four years, and is the first president who was not also a minister.

Eddie Hill after 8 months as president resigned from the post in February 2021. Dr. Stanford Angion was appointed as interim president.

Notable alumni include William Hicks (pastor).

== Buildings and improvements ==
The Women's Baptist State Convention was organized in 1886 and built a girls' dormitory in 1889. This dormitory was named Stone Hall in honor of Miss Susie Stone, Secretary of the Women's Convention.

The Dinkins Memorial Chapel was completed in 1904. It was named in honor of the Reverend C. S. Dinkins, one of the presidents of the school. This building was rebuilt in 1921 after having been destroyed by fire. It was renovated in 1980.

Foster Hall was built in 1910, and named in honor of Susie C. Foster, president of the Women's Convention at the time of its construction.

Cleveland Hall was built in 1948 and was named in honor of M. C. Cleveland Sr. The building contained materials that were taken from the Vickers Home and the Old Arcade Hotel in Selma.

Gibbs Dining Hall was constructed in 1953 and named after Henrietta M. Gibbs.

The Stone-Robinson Library was erected in 1960 and named for Susie Stone, Secretary of the Women's Convention and Reverend U. J. Robinson, President of the Alabama State Missionary Baptist Convention.

The Jemison-Owens Auditorium/Gymnasium was completed in 1966. This building was named in honor of the Reverend D. V. Jemison, who was president of the convention, and James H. Owens, president of the school at the time of its construction.

The Hood-Ware Dormitory for men and the Jackson-Wilson Dormitory for women were completed in 1970.

The A. W. Wilson Science and Computer Hall was completed in 1979.

In 1988, the science complex was expanded with the addition of an annex that houses an auditorium, several instructional laboratories, and two computer facilities, with offices for faculty. The computer-equipped writing laboratory in Dinkins Hall, the mathematics laboratory in the Science addition (completed in 1989), and the expanded library facility which houses a center for audiovisual instruction and computer-aided self-study (completed in 1990) are among the more significant improvements to the campus.

Portions of the campus were listed on the National Register of Historic Places in 2023.

== See also ==
- List of historically black colleges of the United States
