= George Kelley =

George Kelley may refer to:

- George V. Kelley (1843–1905), American officer in Civil War Union Army
- George Davy Kelley (1848–1911), English trades unionist
- George Kelley (American football) (before 1880–after 1901), American college coach
- George Biddle Kelley (1884–1962), American founder of Alpha Phi Alpha fraternity at Cornell University

== See also ==
- George Kelley Paperback and Pulp Fiction Collection, collection at State University of New York at Buffalo
- Kelley (name)
- George Kelly (disambiguation)
