= World Policy Council =

American nonpoartisan think tank

- Formation: 1996
- Type: Think tank
- Headquarters: Washington, D.C., US
- Location: Howard University
- Chairman: Horace Dawson
- Key people: Henry Ponder, vice chairman
- Main organ: Board of Directors
- Parent organization: Alpha Phi Alpha
- Website: https://apa1906.net/special-initiatives/world-policy-council/

The World Policy Council of Alpha Phi Alpha fraternity is a nonprofit and nonpartisan think tank established in 1996 at Howard University to expand the fraternity's involvement in politics and social and current policy to encompass important global and world issues. Its mission is to "address issues of concern to our brotherhood, our communities, our Nation, and the world." Since its founding the council has offered an informed opinion on topics such as the AIDS crisis, global warming, Middle East conflict, Nigerian politics and Martin Luther King Jr.'s vision of a World House.

== Historical context ==
Alpha Phi Alpha is an American intercollegiate organization that was established by African Americans. Founded on December 4, 1906, on the campus of Cornell University in Ithaca, New York, the fraternity utilizes motifs and artifacts from Ancient Egypt to represent the organization and preserves its archives at the Moorland-Spingarn Research Center.

The leadership of Alpha Phi Alpha recognized early on the need to correct the educational, economic, political, and social injustices faced by African-Americans and the world community and began its continuing commitment to providing scholarships for needy students and initiating various other charitable and service projects.

Alpha Phi Alpha has provided leadership and service during the Great Depression, World Wars, Civil Rights Movements, and addresses social issues such as apartheid, AIDS, urban housing, and other economic, cultural, and political issues affecting people of color. The Martin Luther King Jr. Memorial is a program of Alpha Phi Alpha and the fraternity jointly leads philanthropic programming initiatives with March of Dimes, Head Start, Boy Scouts of America and Big Brothers Big Sisters of America.

Alpha men such as W. E. B. Du Bois, Jesse Owens, Duke Ellington, Thurgood Marshall, Andrew Young, and Martin Luther King Jr. are among the litany of fraternity members who have dedicated their lives to the fraternity's principles of "scholarship, manly deeds, and love for all mankind."

== Leadership expansion ==
The leadership by the fraternity was about to expand when, at its 1995 General Convention, Senator Edward Brooke spoke on the need for Alpha Phi Alpha to broaden its view to encompass international concerns. Brooke said, "Our intellectual power is so great that it ought to be shared ... that we should be giving our thoughts and our opinions on domestic and international issues. General President Milton C. Davis established the World Policy Council (WPC) in 1996 as the analytical body of the fraternity to reflect, engage in dialogue and project what ought to happen in actions that are in-line with the values of Alpha Phi Alpha. The mission of The Alpha Phi Alpha World Policy Council as stated on the fraternity's website:

is to address issues of concern to our brotherhood, our communities, our nation, and the world. The Council has been charged with applying sustained and profound intellectual energy to understanding and alternative means of bringing about the resolution of problems at the community, national, and international levels; expanding fraternal and public knowledge of such problems; and engaging public discussion about them. The Council, in fulfilling its mission, is non-partisan, gives consideration to domestic and international issues, seeks the counsel of experts in relevant fields, provides perspectives on specific problems, and, where practicable, recommends possible solutions that may impact favorably African Americans, the community, the nation, and the world.

The council was created with seven board members to research and outline the fraternity's position on issues and policies deemed to be of national or international importance. Milton appointed Brooke as the council's first chairman. The council's membership increased to nine when General President Harry E. Johnson's appointed Congressman Ron Dellums and Cornel West. Johnson also extended the World Policy Council's role to include a lecture series on tolerance and a focus on the issue of HIV infections and AIDS.

Organizing a World Policy Council, Alpha Phi Alpha fraternity suddenly made global headlines when the group asked Nigeria to release political prisoners.

— Simeon Booker, Jet

The World Policy Council has studied and issued white papers on the Politics of Nigeria, war on terrorism, and global warming. The Council garnered international attention in 1999 when it issued a clarion call to Nigeria to release political prisoners and become a force for good on the African continent. The fifth paper was published in 2006 to coincide with the Centenary of Alpha Phi Alpha and among its five topics examined the impact of Black Greek letter organizations in American culture and Hurricane Katrina, the costliest and one of the five deadliest hurricanes in the history of the United States.

The Council distributes the white papers to the White House, Congress, key national leaders, fraternity chapters, and those whose decisions shape the future. A letter is sent to the office of the President of the United States providing an informed opinion of individuals and constituents on how the President should act to resolve an issue or policy.

== Position papers ==
The WPC presented its first position paper to the fraternity's general membership at the 1996 Alpha Scholarship Forum in New Orleans, Louisiana, as part of its inaugural Charles H. Wesley Memorial Scholarship Lecture. The fourth and fifth reports were issued in 2002 and 2006, respectively. The fifth report by the Council addresses five issues, such as the Millennium Challenge Account, Extraordinary rendition, and The World House as envisioned by Martin Luther King Jr.

== Notable members ==
Edward Brooke, a former United States Senator and Attorney General of the Commonwealth of Massachusetts, served as the first chairman of the World Policy Council. Other notable members include Bobby William Austin, Ron Dellums., Kenton Keith, Henry Ponder, Charles B. Rangel, and Cornel West.
