= Kelly George =

Kelly George may refer to:

- Kelly George (news anchor)
- Kelly George (actor)

== See also ==
- George Kelly (disambiguation)
