= List of Alpha Phi Alpha national conventions =

Alpha Phi Alpha is an intercollegiate historically African American fraternity. It was formed at Cornell University on December 4, 1906. The general conventions and other national conventions of Alpha Phi Alpha are as follows.

Convention number	Dates	Location	Host chapter	Anniversary	Refs
1st	December 28, 1908	Howard University; Washington, D. C.	Beta		
2nd	December 27, 1909 – December 29, 1909	Virginia Union University; Richmond, Virginia	Gamma		(Note: Crisis indicates this conference was held in New York City, New York.)
3rd	December 29, 1910 – December 31, 1910	Philadelphia, Pennsylvania			
4th	December 27, 1911 – December 30, 1911	University of Michigan; Ann Arbor, Michigan	Epsilon		
5th	December 26, 1912 – December 28, 1912	Ohio State University; Columbus, Ohio	Kappa		
6th	December 29, 1913 – December 31, 1913	Howard University; Washington, D. C.	Beta		(Note: The conception of the Sphinx came out of this convention.)
7th	December 29, 1914	Chicago, Illinois	Theta		
8th	December 27, 1915 – December 29, 1915	University of Pittsburgh; Pittsburgh, Pennsylvania	Omicron		
9th	December 27, 1916 – December 30, 1916	Virginia Union University; Richmond, Virginia	Gamma		
10th	December 26, 1917 – December 29, 1917	Philadelphia, Pennsylvania	Rho and Nu		
11th	December 27, 1918 – December 31, 1918	Cleveland, Ohio	Pi		
12th	1919	Chicago, Illinois	Theta		
13th	1920	Kansas City, Missouri	Beta Lambda		
14th	December 17, 1921 – December 20, 1921	Baltimore, Maryland	Delta Lambda		(Note: Convention was followed by travel to Washington, D.C. on December 28, 1921 to Initiate of Frederick Douglass into the Omega chapter.)
15th	December 27, 1922 – December 31, 1922	St. Louis, Missouri	Epsilon Lambda		
16th	December 27, 1923 – December 31, 1923	Columbus, Ohio	Kappa		(Note: The Delta Sigma Theta convention held simultaneously.)
17th	December 27, 1924	New York City, New York	Eta		
18th	December 1925	Detroit, Michigan	Gamma Lambda		
19th	December 27, 1926 – December 31, 1926	Virginia Union University; Richmond, Virginia	Gamma		
20th	1927	Cleveland, Ohio	Pi		
21st	1928	Philadelphia, Pennsylvania	Rho and Psi		
22nd	December 28, 1929 – December 31, 1929	Atlanta, Georgia	Alpha Phi, Alpha Rho, and Eta Lambda		
23rd	1931	Cincinnati, Ohio	Alpha Alpha	25th	
24th	1933	St. Louis, Missouri	Eta Lambda	27th	
	August 19, 1934 – August 22, 1934	Chicago, Illinois	Theta and Xi Lambda		(Note: This was a special conferencedevoted to ending Jim Crow practices in public education.)
25th	December 28, 1935 – December 31, 1935	Nashville, Tennessee	Chi, Alpha Chi, Beta Omicron, and Tau Lambda	29th	(Note: This conference was hosted at Tennessee State University campus.)
	1936	Los Angeles, California	Alpha Delta		
26th	1937	New Orleans, Louisiana	Beta Tau and Sigma Lambda	31st	
27th	August 28, 1939	New York City, New York	Eta and Alpha Gamma Lambda		(Note: Began use of General Convention with this year.)
28th	December 30, 1940	Kansas City, Missouri	Beta Lambda		(Note: This was a Tri-Convention with Alpha Kappa Alpha and Kappa Alpha Psi.) (Note: Membership requirement to be a Negro was removed at the conference)
29th	1941	Louisville, Kentucky	Alpha Lambda	35th	
30th	1944	Atlantic City, New Jersey	Alpha Theta Lambda	38th	
31st	1945	Chicago, Illinois	Theta and Xi Lambda	39th	
32nd	1946	Columbus, Ohio	Kappa and Alpha Rho Lambda	40th	
33rd	December 28, 1947	Tulsa, Oklahoma	Alpha Tau Lambda	41st	(Note: Former Vice President Henry A. Wallace gave a speech at the convention.)
34th	1948	Atlantic City, New Jersey	Alpha Theta Lambda	42nd	
35th	1949	Atlanta, Georgia	Eta Lambda, Alpha Rho-Alpha Phi, and Iota	43rd	(Note: The theme of this convention was Segregation Must Go.)
36th	1950	Kansas City, Missouri	Beta Lambda	44th	
37th	December 27, 1951 – December 30, 1951	Berkeley, California	Alpha Epsilon	45th	(Note: Jet magazine (January 17, 1951) has Los Angeles/Santa Monica as the location.)
38th	December 26, 1952 – December 30, 1952	Cleveland, Ohio	Pi and Delta-Alpha Lambda	46th	(Note: This was a joint convention with Alpha Kappa Alpha, Delta Sigma Theta. Kappa Alpha Psi, Sigma Gamma Rho, and Zeta Phi Beta.) (Note: The constitution was changed to allow admission "regardless of race, color or creed" at this convention.)
39th	December 27, 1953 – December 31, 1953	Detroit, Michigan	Gamma Lambda and Alpha Psi	47th	(Note: The convention's theme was "First of All Servants of All". Its speakers included Thurgood Marshall and Archibald Carey Jr.)
40th	December 27, 1954 – December 30, 1954	Miami, Florida	Beta Beta Lambda	48th	
41st	December 27, 1955 – December 30, 1955	Morrison Hotel; Chicago, Illinois	Theta and Xi Lambda	49th	(Note: The convention's theme was "Desegregation the Mode; Total Integration the Goal") (Note: During the convention the National Headquarters in Chicago was dedicated.)
42nd	August 7, 1956 – August 11, 1956	Buffalo, New York	Rho Lambda and the General Organization	50th	(Note: The convention's theme was "Building on the Past--To Face the Challenges of the Future." Its speakers were New York Governor W. Averell Harriman, Kentucky Senator John Sherman Cooper, and Martin Luther King Jr.)
43rd	1957	Los Angeles, California	Alpha Delta, Gamma Xi, and Beta Phi Lambda	51st	
44th	1958	Philadelphia, Pennsylvania	Rho, Zeta Omicron Lambda, and Psi	52nd	
45th	December 26, 1959 – December 30, 1959	Cincinnati, Ohio	Alpha Alpha and Delta Gamma Lambda	53rd	(Note: This was a joint convention with Alpha Kappa Alpha.)
46th	August 19, 1960 – August 23, 1960	Washington, D. C.	Beta, Mu Lambda and Omicron Lambda Alpha	54th	
47th	December 1961	Louisville, Kentucky	Alpha Lambda, Alpha Beta Lambda, Gamma Beta Lambda, and Psi Lambda	55th	
48th	December 1962	Columbus, Ohio	Kappa and Alpha Rho Lambda	56th	(Note: This was the last wintertime convention.)
49th	August 16, 1963 – August 22, 1963	Boston, Massachusetts	Sigma and Epsilon Lambda	57th	
50th	August 14, 1964 – August 20, 1964	New York City, New York	Eta, Alpha Gamma Lambda, Eta Zeta Lambda, Delta Chi, Gamma Iota Lambda, Delta Chi, Zeta Zeta Lambda, Eta Chi Lambda, and Eta Theta Lambda	58th	(Note: This convention's theme was Communication - Excellence: Key to Equality.)
51st	August 1965	Chicago, Illinois	Theta and Xi Lambda	59th	(Note: The convention's speakers were Vice President Hubert H. Humphrey and Chicago Mayor Richard J. Daley.)
52nd	1966	St. Louis, Missouri	Delta Eta, Alpha Epsilon Lambda, and Epsilon Lambda	60th	
53rd	1967	Los Angeles, California	Beta Psi Lambda, Gamma Xi, and Alpha Delta	61st	
54th	August 1968	Detroit, Michigan	Alpha Psi and Gamma Lambda	62nd	
55th	August 1969	Shamrock Hotel; Houston, Texas	Delta Theta, Eta Mu, Alpha Eta Lambda, Xi Kappa Lambda, Zeta Tau Lambda, and Xi Eta Lambda	63rd	
56th	1970	Philadelphia, Pennsylvania	Psi, Rho, and Zeta Omicron Lambda	64th	
57th	1971	Milwaukee, Wisconsin	Delta Chi Lambda and Epsilon Tau	65th	
58th	1972	Denver, Colorado	Delta Psi Lambda and Iota Omicron Lambda	66th	
59th	August 1973	Roosevelt-Fairmont Hotel, New Orleans, Louisiana	Sigma Lambda, Beta Phi, and Epsilon Chi	67th	
60th	1974	Bay Area	Bay Area Chapters	68th	
61st	August 1, 1975 – August 7, 1975	Fontainebleau Hotel; Miami Beach, Florida	Beta Beta Lambda and Miami Area chapters	69th	(Note: The convention's theme was Alpha's Outreach to Business.)
62nd, Phase 1	July 30, 1976 – August 3, 1976	New York City, New York	Greater New York, New Jersey, and Connecticut chapters	70th	
62nd, Phase 2	August 3, 1976 – August 9, 1976	Monrovia, Liberia, West Africa	Eta Epsilon Lambda	70th	
63rd	August 5, 1977 – August 10, 1977	Hilton Atlanta; Atlanta, Georgia	Iota and Epsilon Lambda	71st	
64th	July 28, 1978 – August 3, 1978	Minneapolis, Minnesota	Mu and Gamma Xi Lambda	72nd	
65th	August 3, 1979 – August 9, 1979	Washington, D. C.	Beta and Mu Lambda	73rd	(Note: The convention's theme was Alphas in Government: Planning for the Future of Our Children. The speaker was UN Ambassador Andrew Young.)
66th	August 1, 1980 –	Chicago, Illinois	Xi Lambda	74th	
67th	July 31, 1981 – August 6, 1981	Dallas, Texas	Alpha Sigma Lambda	75th	(Note: The convention's theme was Saluting the Past – Securing the Future (The Agenda for the '80s). Its speakers were Christopher Edley Jr., Vernon Jordan, Maynard Jackson, and Ernest Morial.)
68th	August 1982	Los Angeles, California	Gamma Xi and Beta Psi Lambda	76th	(Note: The convention's peakers included Jesse Jackson and John E. Jacob.)
69th	1983	New Orleans, Louisiana	Sigma Lambda	77th	
70th	August 3, 1984 – August 7, 1984	Stouffer's Inn on the Square; Cleveland, Ohio	Pi and Delta Alpha Lambda	78th	
71st	August 1985	Atlanta, Georgia	Eta Lambda	79th	
72nd	July 31, 1986 – August 6, 1986	Washington Hilton; Washington, D. C.	Mu Lambda	80th	
73rd	July 23, 1987 – July 29, 1987	San Francisco Hilton; San Francisco, California	Gamma Chi Lambda	81st	
74th	1988	Kansas City, Missouri	Beta Lambda	82nd	
75th	July 27, 1989 – August 2, 1989	Marriott Rivercenter and Riverwalk hotels San Antonio, Texas	Mu Nu and Delta Rho Lambda	83rd	
76th	August 2, 1990February 8, 1990	Fontainebleau Miama Hotel; Miami Beach, Florida	Beta Beta Lambda	84th	
77th	August 1991	Omni Radisson; Baltimore, Maryland	Beta Alpha and Delta Lambda	85th	
78th	August 1992	Anaheim, California	Nu Tau Lambda	86th	
79th	July 29, 1993–August 4, 1993	New Orleans, Louisiana	Sigma Lambda	87th	(Note: The convention's speakers included Senator Edward Brooke.)
80th	August 1994	Chicago Hilton Hotel and Towers; Chicago, Illinois	Xi Lambda	88th	(Note: The convention's speakers were Lee Brown, Cardiss Collins, Alexis M. Herman, Dennis Archer, John H. Johnson, Marian Wright Edelman, Horace Dawson, and Bobby William Austin.)
81st	August 1995	Orlando, Florida	Delta Xi Lambda	89th	(Note: The speakers were John Hope Franklin, Delano Lewis, Hugh B. Price, and Marc Morial.)
	August 1996	New Orleans, Louisiana	Sigma Lambda	90th	(Note: This was the National Alpha Scholarship Forum with speakers Edward Brooke and Horace Dawson.)
82nd	July 31, 1997 – August 4, 1997	Washington, D. C.	Mu Lambda	91st	(Note: The speaker for this convention was James A. Joseph.)
	August 2, 1998	Nassau Marriott Resort and Crystal Palace Hotels; Nassau, Bahamas	Iiota Epsilon Lambda	92nd	(Note: This included an Economics Empowerment Seminar.)
83rd	July 29, 1999 – August 3, 1999	Wyndham Anatole; Dallas, Texas	Alpha Sigma Lambda and Xi Tau Lambda	93rd	
	August 3, 2000 – August 8, 2000	Hyatt Regency; Atlanta, Georgia	Alpha Rho and Eta Lambda	94th	
84th	August 2, 2001 – August 7, 2001	Marriott Hotel; New Orleans, Louisiana	Rho Iota and Sigma Lambda	95th	
	August 1, 2002 – August 4, 2002	Bally's Las Vegas; Las Vegas, Nevada	Mu and Gamma Xi Lambda	96th	(Note: This was an Economic Development Conference.)
85th	July 31, 2003 – August 5, 2003	Renaissance Center; Detroit, Michigan	Pi Psi and Gamma Lambda	97th	
	August 5, 2004 – August 8, 2004	Philadelphia Marriott; Philadelphia, Pennsylvania	Psi and Rho	98th	(Note: This was a Constitutional Convention.)
86th	August 4, 2005 – August 8, 2005	Hilton Americas Hotel; Houston, Texas	Delta Theta and Alpha Eta Lambda	99th	
	July 25, 2006 – July 30, 2006	Marriott Wardman Park; Washington, D. C.	Beta and Mu Lambda	100th	(Note: This was the Centennial Convention. Its speakers were Hugh B. Price, Andrew Young, Lou Gossett Jr., and Bill Pinkney.)
87th	August 9, 2007 – August 13, 2007	Rosen Shingle Creek; Orlando, Florida	Delta Xi Lambda	101st	
88th	July 17, 2008 – July 21, 2008	Bartle Hall Convention Center; Kansas City, Missouri		102nd	
89th	July 15, 2009 – July 19, 2009	Hilton New Orleans Riverside; New Orleans, Louisiana		103rd	
90th	July 21, 2010 – July 25, 2010	Bally's Las Vegas; Las Vegas, Nevada		104th	
91st	June 22, 2011 – June 26, 2011	Hilton Chicago; Chicago, Illinois		105th	(Note: The convention's theme was A Global Vision for Brotherhood: Gateway to the Dream.)
92nd	June 26, 2013 – June 30, 2013	Hilton Austin Hotel; Austin, Texas	Gamma Eta Lambda	107th	(Note: The convention's theme was Few in Number, Mighty in Power, Influence in Service.)
93rd	August 5, 2015 – August 9, 2015	Charlotte Convention Center; Charlotte, North Carolina	Beta Nu Lambda, Alpha Omicron, Mu Tau, and Tau Omicron	109th	(Note: the convention's theme was Focused on the Future: Investing in our Community, Health, Wealth and Self.)
94th	July 12, 2017 – July 16, 2017	Baltimore Convention Center; Baltimore, Maryland		111th	(Note: The convention's theme was The Urgency of Now.)
95th	July 24, 2019 – July 28, 2019	Bally's Las Vegas; Las Vegas, Nevada		113th	(Note: The convention's theme was Alpha Advocacy in Action: Silence Is Not An Option.)
96th	July 14, 2021 – July 18, 2021	JW Marriott Indianapolis; Indianapolis, Indiana	Iota Lambda, Gamma Rho, and Theta Xi	115th	(Note: The convention's theme was Elevating the Alpha Spirit: Men of Distinction Impacting Our Communities.)
97th	July 26, 2023 – July 30, 2023	Hilton Anatole; Dallas, Texas	Alpha Sigma Lambda, Beta Tau Lambda, Nu Pi Lambda, Xi Tau Lambda, Rho Nu Lambda, and Eta Pi Lambda	117th	(Note: The convention's theme was Theme: Strengthening the Brotherhood and Standing for Social Justice.)
