= Alpha Phi Alpha =

Historically African American fraternity

- ΑΦΑ
- Founded: December 4, 1906; 119 years ago Cornell University
- Type: Social
- Affiliation: NPHC; NIC
- Status: Active
- Emphasis: African American
- Scope: International
- Motto: "First of All, Servants of All, We Shall Transcend All"
- Pillars: Manly Deeds, Scholarship, and Love For All Mankind
- Colors: Old Gold and Black
- Symbol: Sphinx
- Flower: Yellow rose
- Publication: The Sphinx
- Chapters: 900+
- Members: 290,000+ lifetime
- Nicknames: Alphas, Ice Cold Brothas, The Oldest & The Coldest, Men of Distinction
- Headquarters: 2313 Saint Paul Street; Baltimore, Maryland 21218; United States
- Website: apa1906.net

Alpha Phi Alpha Fraternity, Inc. (ΑΦΑ) is the oldest intercollegiate historically African American fraternity. It was initially a literary and social studies club organized in the 1905–1906 school year at Cornell University but later evolved into a fraternity with a founding date of December 4, 1906. It employs an icon from Ancient Egypt, the Great Sphinx of Giza, as its symbol. Its aims or pillars are "Manly Deeds, Scholarship, and Love For All Mankind," and its motto is "First of All, Servants of All, We Shall Transcend All." Its archives are preserved at the Moorland-Spingarn Research Center.

Chapters were chartered at Howard University and Virginia Union University in 1907. The fraternity has over 290,000 members and has been open to men of all races since 1945. Currently, there are more than 730 active chapters in the Americas, Africa, Europe, the Caribbean, and Asia. It is the largest predominantly African-American intercollegiate fraternity and one of the ten largest intercollegiate fraternities in the United States.

Alpha Phi Alpha is a social organization with a service organization mission and provided leadership and service during the Great Depression, World Wars, and Civil Rights Movement. The fraternity addresses social issues such as apartheid, AIDS, urban housing, and other economic, cultural, and political issues of interest to people of color. National programs and initiatives of the fraternity include A Voteless People Is a Hopeless People, My Brother's Keeper, Go To High School, Go To College, Project Alpha, and the World Policy Council. It also conducts philanthropic programming initiatives with the March of Dimes, Head Start, the Boy Scouts of America, and Big Brothers Big Sisters of America.

Members of this fraternity include many historical civil rights leaders such as Martin Luther King Jr., NAACP founder W. E. B. Du Bois, John Mack, Rev. Joseph E. Lowery, Rev. C.T. Vivian, and Dick Gregory. Other members include political activist Cornel West, musicians Duke Ellington, Donny Hathaway, and Lionel Richie, NBA player Walt Frazier, NFL player Charles Haley, Jamaican Prime Minister Norman Manley, Olympic gold medalist Jesse Owens, Justice Thurgood Marshall, businessman Robert F. Smith, United Nations Ambassador Andrew Young, and film director Barry Jenkins.

Alpha Phi Alpha was directly responsible for the conception, funding, and construction of the Martin Luther King Jr. Memorial next to the National Mall in Washington, D.C.

== History ==
=== Founding ===
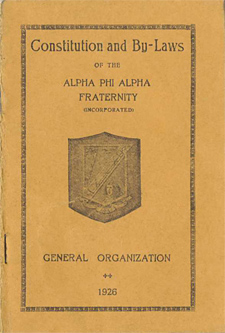
The 1907 ΑΦΑ Constitution and Bylaws

At the start of the 20th century, African-American students at American universities were often excluded from fraternal organizations enjoyed by the predominantly white student population at non-black colleges. Charles Cardoza Poindexter organized a group of students for literary discussion and social functions at Cornell University. The group initially consisted of 15 students and included women. The initial study group consisted of 14 students. These students included four from Washington, D.C. – Robert Ogle, Fred Morgan Phillip, Fannie Holland, and Flaxie Holcosbe. There were also four men and a woman from New York State: George Kelley, Henry A. Callis, James Thomas, Gordon Jones, and Paul Ray. From West Virginia came Eugene Kinckle Jones and Mary Vassar. Vertner Tandy came from Kentucky, and C.H. Chapman was from Florida.

The group met every two weeks at 421 North Albany Street, where Poindexter roomed. Poindexter was stated to have a relationship with the other students of the group that was more faculty-to-student than peer-to-peer, given that he was the secretary of a professor at Cornell. In December 1905, Poindexter organized a meeting of students which included Murray, Ogle, Phillips, Chapman, Kelley, Callis, Tandy, and George Tompkins.

Robert Ogle had seen an article in the Chicago Defender magazine about a Negro fraternity at Ohio State University called Pi Gamma Omicron, which the university did not know. Pi Gamma Omicron inspired Ogle to try to transform the literary society into a fraternity. There was disagreement about the group's purpose: some wanted a social and literary club where everyone could participate; others wanted a traditional fraternal organization. Poindexter felt the group should serve the cultural and social needs of the black community and not be an elite secret society. The society decided to work to provide a literary, study, social, and support group for all minority students who encountered social and academic racial prejudice. On October 23, 1906, George Kelley proposed that the organization be officially known by the Greek letters Alpha Phi Alpha, and Robert Ogle proposed the colors black and old gold. Poindexter became the first President of Alpha Phi Alpha; under his leadership, the first banquet, initiation procedures, and policies were introduced.

The divisive issue of whether the terms "club" or "fraternity" should be used was still debated. A vote again confirmed the name Alpha Phi Alpha with the colors of old gold and black. The initiation of new members Eugene Kinckle Jones, Lemuel Graves, and Gordon Jones took place on October 30, 1906, at a Masonic Hall including James Morton was considered and selected, but at the time he was not registered at the university. Two founding members learned about fraternity rituals from other fraternal organizations: Henry A. Callis worked in the Sigma Alpha Epsilon fraternity House, and Kelly worked at Beta Theta Pi fraternity house. Coincidentally, an article about a Negro fraternity Pi Gamma Omicron's ambitions to become a national fraternity was noted by a Beta Theta Pi correspondent at Ohio State University. Callis said that these fraternities, SAE and BTP, were the source of the fraternity rituals. The other members of the group felt that Poindexter, as a graduate student, dominated the meetings of Alpha Phi Alpha. In his absence in the meeting in November 1906, the fraternity idea was pushed for a vote by Murray and was seconded by Robert H Ogle. In December 1906, George Tompkins' resignation was accepted. Seven of the original 12 men from the initial meeting in December 1905 would continue as members of the fraternity.

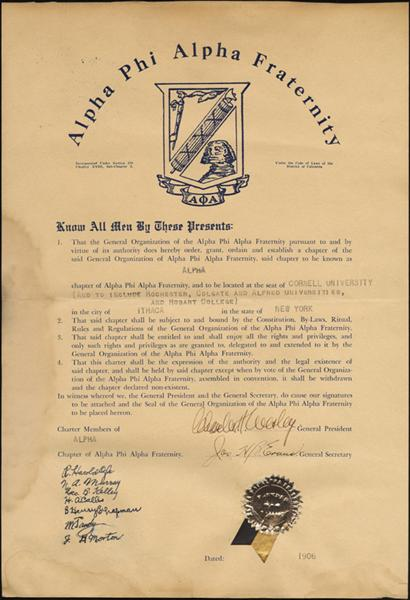
The 1906 charter for Alpha chapter at Cornell University

By December 4, 1906, the decision on a name was made: "fraternity". The earlier terms "club", "organization", and "society" were permanently removed. Before the December 4, 1906, meeting, Poindexter had submitted his letter of resignation from the Alpha Phi Alpha club/society, as he took a new job in Hampton University in Virginia. Eleven members were present during the date of the founding of the fraternity on December 4, 1906. Despite Poindexter's role in the formation of Alpha Phi Alpha, it was agreed that his name would not be linked to the early formation of the fraternity by its founders. Murray was emphatic in his belief that Poindexter should not be considered to be a founder despite his role. As Charles Wesley stated in the fraternity's history book, "C.C. Poindexter deserves special mention. Without his serious and eager leadership, the fraternal organization would probably have advanced more slowly. He was the moving spirit in the literary organization, which served as the predecessor of the fraternity. He acted as president of the group and continued in office during the formation of the early policies and also through the first initiation in Alpha Phi Alpha society." According to his wife, Poindexter did not oppose the idea of a fraternity.

The original fraternal founding members are now stated to be Henry Arthur Callis, Charles Henry Chapman, Eugene Kinckle Jones (who replaced James Morton), George Biddle Kelley, Nathaniel Allison Murray, Robert Harold Ogle, and Vertner Woodson Tandy. Eugene Kinkle Jones who joined the group in October 1906 was given the title of a founder in 1952, while James Morton was removed because of his lack of enrollment at Cornell. The founders are collectively known as the Seven Jewels.

Mrs. Annie C Singleton played a pivotal part in helping the organization in its early years. She became the Mother of the fraternity as a result.

=== Consolidation and expansion ===
The fraternity's constitution was adopted on December 4, 1906, limiting membership to "Negro male" students and providing that the General Convention of the Fraternity would be created following the establishment of the fourth chapter of Alpha Phi Alpha. The preamble states the purpose of Alpha Phi Alpha:

To promote a perfect union among college men; to aid in and insist upon the personal progress of its members; to further brotherly love and a fraternal spirit within the organization; to discountenance evil; to destroy all prejudices; to preserve the sanctity of the home, the personification of virtue and the chastity of woman.

Chapters of Alpha Phi Alpha are given Greek-letter names in order of installation into the fraternity. No chapter is designated Omega, the last letter of the Greek alphabet and traditionally used for "the end". Deceased brothers are considered by brothers to have joined Omega chapter.

Founders Eugene Kinckle Jones and Nathaniel Allison Murray chartered the second, third, and fourth chapters at Howard University, Virginia Union University, and the University of Toronto, respectively, in December 1907 and January 1908. The charter at Howard made it the site of the organization of the first black Greek letter organization for men among historically black colleges. The first black Greek letter organization among historically black colleges was Alpha Kappa Alpha, as it was established early in November 1907.

The purpose and objective of the fraternity within the articles of incorporation were declared "educational and for the mutual uplift of its members." The fraternity has established the Alpha Phi Alpha Archives at Howard University's Moorland-Spingarn Research Center to preserve the history of the organization.

The fraternity chartered its first international chapter at the University of Toronto in 1908. Chapters have been chartered in London, Frankfurt, Monrovia, the Caribbean, South Africa, and South Korea.

The first General Convention at Howard University in 1908

The first general convention was assembled in December 1908 at Howard University in Washington, D.C., producing the first ritual and the election of the first General President of Alpha Phi Alpha, Moses A. Morrison. Each newly elected General President is automatically considered one of the "100 most influential Black Americans".

The fraternity established its first alumni chapter, Alpha Lambda, in 1911 in Louisville, Kentucky. It was again incorporated as a national organization on April 3, 1912, under the laws of Congress within the District of Columbia, under the name and title of The Alpha Phi Alpha Fraternity.

For more than 100 years, Alpha Phi Alpha and its members have had a voice and influence on politics and current affairs. The Crisis, the magazine of the National Association for the Advancement of Colored People (NAACP), was started by fraternity member W. E. B. Du Bois in 1910. In 1914, The Sphinx, named after the Egyptian landmark, began publication as the fraternity's journal. The Crisis and The Sphinx are respectively the first and second oldest continuously published black journals in the United States. The National Urban League's (NUL) Opportunity: Journal of Negro Life was first published in 1923 under the leadership of Alpha founder Eugene K. Jones and Charles Johnson as its executive editor.

Alpha Phi Alpha Fourth Annual Convention 1912, Elected President Charles H. Garvin on bottom right

In 1912, Charles H. Garvin was elected as the fourth annual president of Alpha Phi Alpha at the fourth annual convention in Ann Arbor, Michigan, and was the first individual to serve two terms as president. He served two terms as president, between 1912 and 1914. While in office he helped secure a chapter house, appointed a special committee to consult with the president of Howard, and asked members to 'use every means possible to raise the moral and scholastic tone of the Fraternity". Garvin saw that it was vital that the Fraternity establish a mindful image and perception for future generations. One of the most notable contributions made by Garvin was the national incorporation of the fraternity under the laws of Congress. As president, Garvin wrote the fraternity's Esprit De Fraternite. In it, he dictated:

An Alpha Phi Alpha man's attitude should not be 'how much can I derive from the Fraternity' but 'how much can I do for the Fraternity?' In proportion to what he does for his Chapter and Alpha Phi Alpha, will a member receive lasting benefits from the Fraternity himself in the way of self-development by duty well done and the respect of the Brothers served?
A member's duties should be:
1. Prompt payment of all financial obligations, the prime requisite for a successful fraternal life
2. The doing of good scholastic work in his chosen vocation, thereby accomplishing the real end of a college course
3. The reasonable endeavor to participate in general college activities and social service and to excel therein
4. The proper consideration of all things with appropriate attention to the high moral standard of Alpha Phi Alpha.

The Training Camp at Fort Des Moines during World War I was the result of the fraternity's advocacy in lobbying the government to create an Officers' training camp for black troops. Thirty-two Alpha men were granted commissions (four were made captains and many were first lieutenants). First Lieutenant Victor Daly was decorated with the Croix de Guerre for his service in France. Today, the fort is a museum and education center which honors the U.S. Army's first officer candidate class for African-American men in 1917.

While continuing to stress academic excellence among its members, Alpha's leaders recognized the need to correct the educational, economic, political, and social injustices faced by African Americans and the world community. Alpha Phi Alpha has a long history of providing scholarships for needy students and initiating various other charitable and service projects. It evolved from a social fraternity to a primarily community service organization.

=== History: 1919–1949 ===
The fraternity's national programs date back to 1919, with its "Go-To-High School, Go-to-College" campaign to promote academic achievement within the African-American community as its first initiative.

The 1920s witnessed the birth of the Harlem Renaissance–a flowering of African-American art, literature, music, and culture which began to be absorbed into the mainstream American culture. Alpha Phi Alpha fraternity brothers Charles Johnson, W. E. B. Du Bois, Noble Sissle, Countee Cullen, and other members were entrepreneurs and participants in this creative upsurge led primarily by the African-American community based in Harlem, New York City. By the end of the 1920s, the fraternity had chartered 85 chapters throughout the United States and initiated over 3,000 members.

During the Great Depression, Alpha Phi Alpha and its members continued to implement programs to support the black community. The Committee on Public Policy, the Alpha Phi Alpha Education Foundation, and "The Foundation Publishers" were established at the 1933 general convention. The Committee on Public Policy took positions on numerous issues important to the black community. It investigated the performance of Franklin D. Roosevelt's New Deal agencies to assess the status of the black population, both in the treatment of agencies' employees and in the quality of services rendered to American blacks. Alpha men Rayford Logan and Eugene K. Jones were members of Roosevelt's unofficial Black Cabinet, an informal group of African-American public policy advisors to the President.

The Education Foundation was created in recognition of the educational, economic, and social needs of African Americans in the United States. The foundation, led by Rayford Logan, was structured to provide scholarships and grants to African-American students. The Foundation Publishers would provide financial support and fellowship for writers addressing African-American issues. Historian and fraternity brother John Hope Franklin was an early beneficiary of the publishing company and was the 2006 Kluge Prize recipient for lifetime achievement in the study of humanity.

In 1933 fraternity brother Belford Lawson Jr. founded the New Negro Alliance (NNA) in Washington D.C. to combat white-run businesses in black neighborhoods that would not hire black employees. The NNA instituted a then-radical "Don't Buy Where You Can't Work" campaign and organized or threatened boycotts against white-owned businesses. In response, some businesses arranged for an injunction to stop the picketing. NNA lawyers, including Lawson and Thurgood Marshall, fought back – to the Supreme Court of the United States in New Negro Alliance v. Sanitary Grocery Co. This ruling in favor of the NAACP became a landmark case in the struggle by African Americans against discriminatory hiring practices. "Don't Buy Where You Can't Work" groups multiplied throughout the nation.^{[a]} The fraternity sponsors an annual Belford V. Lawson Oratorical Contest in which collegiate members demonstrate their oratorical skills first at the chapter level, with the winner competing at the District, Regional and General Convention.

The fraternity began to participate in voting rights issues, coining the well-known phrase "A Voteless People is a Hopeless People" as part of its effort to register black voters. This term was coined by the Alpha Omicron Chapter located at Johnson C. Smith University in 1936. The Institute for Philosophy and Public Policy said, "Alpha Phi Alpha...developed citizenship schools in the urban South and with its slogan "A Voteless People is a Hopeless People" registered hundreds of blacks during the 1930s, decades before the Southern Christian Leadership Conference (SCLC) and the Student Nonviolent Coordinating Committee (SNCC) launched their citizenship schools in the 1960s." The slogan is still used in Alpha Phi Alpha's continuing voter registration campaign. Alpha Phi Alpha member and former Washington, D.C., mayor Marion Barry was the first chairman of the SNCC.

Alphamen led the way in achieving competitive glory for the nation as well as racial pride for black America.

— Harold Rudolph Sims

Seven Alpha men represented the United States at the politically charged 1936 Summer Olympics: Jesse Owens, Ralph Metcalfe, Fritz Pollard Jr., Cornelius Johnson, Archie Williams, Dave Albritton, and John Woodruff. In 1938, Alpha Phi Alpha continued to expand and became an international organization when a chapter was chartered in London, England.

Alpha Phi Alpha supported legal battles against segregation. Some of its members who were trial lawyers argued many of the nation's major court cases involving civil rights and civil liberties. The case styled Murray v. Pearson (1935) was initiated by the fraternity and successfully argued by Alpha men Thurgood Marshall and Charles Houston to challenge biases at the university, which had no laws requiring segregation in its colleges. The fraternity assisted in a similar case that involved fraternity brother Lloyd Gaines. In Gaines v. Canada, the most important segregation case since Plessy v. Ferguson, Gaines was denied admission to the Law School at the University of Missouri because he was black. Alpha men Houston and Sidney Redmon successfully argued that "States that provide only one educational institution must allow blacks and whites to attend if there is no separate school for blacks."

In 1940, true to its form as the "first of first", Alpha Phi Alpha sought to end racial discrimination within its membership. The use of the word "Negro" in the membership clause of the constitution, which referred to "any Negro male student," would be changed to read "any male student." The unanimous decision to change the constitution happened in 1945 and was the first official action by a BGLO to allow the admission of all colors and races. Bernard Levin became the first non-black member in 1946, and Roger Youmans became the first non-black member to address the fraternity at the 1954 general convention.

After the attack on Pearl Harbor in 1941 and the nation's entry into World War II, the fraternity fought to secure rights for its members within the ranks of officers in the armed forces. The types of warfare encountered evidenced the nexus between education and war, with illiteracy decreasing a soldier's usefulness to the Army that could only be addressed with the inclusion of a large number of college-educated men among the ranks of officers. Alpha men served in almost every branch of the military and civilian defense programs during World War II. The leadership of the fraternity encouraged Alpha men to buy war bonds, and the membership responded with their purchases. The fraternity's long tradition of military service has remained strong. Alpha's military leaders Samuel Gravely and Benjamin Hacker were followed by other fraternity members who lead and serve in the armed forces.

In 1946, fraternity brother Paul Robeson, in a letter to the editor published in The New York Times, referring to apartheid and South Africa's impending request to annex South-West Africa, a League of Nations mandate, appealed:

to my fellow Americans to make known their protest against such conditions to the South African Ministry in Washington; to send to the Council on African Affairs an expression of support for these grievously oppressed workers in South Africa; to keep the South African situation in mind against the time when General Smuts will come to the United Nations Assembly to demand the annexation of South West Africa, which means more Africans for him to exploit.

In 1947, Alpha Phi Alpha awarded Robeson the Alpha Medallion for his "outstanding role as a champion of freedom."^{[b]}

=== History: 1950–1969 ===
The general convention in 1952 was the venue for a significant historical action taken regarding the Seventh Jewel Founder. The decision "of placing Brother [Eugene] Jones in his true historical setting resulting from the leading role which he had played in the origin and development of the early years of the fraternity history" was made by a special committee consisting of Jewels Callis, Kelley and Murray, and fraternity historian Charles H. Wesley. James Morton was removed as a founder, yet continues to be listed as one of the first initiates. This convention created the Alpha Award of Merit and the Alpha Award of Honor for appreciation of the tireless efforts on behalf of African Americans, and was awarded to Thurgood Marshall and Eugene K. Jones.

In 1956, the fraternity made a "pilgrimage"^{[c]} to Cornell in celebration of its Golden Jubilee, which drew about 1,000 members who traveled by chartered train from Buffalo, New York, to Ithaca. Fraternity brother Martin Luther King Jr. delivered the keynote speech at the 50th-anniversary banquet, in which he spoke on the "Injustices of Segregation". There were three living Jewels present for the occasion: Kelley, Callis, and Murray.

Alpha men were at the forefront of the Civil Rights Movement during the 1950s. In Montgomery, Martin Luther King Jr. led the people in the Montgomery bus boycott as a minister and later as head of the SCLC. Birmingham saw Arthur Shores organize for civil rights in Lucy v. Adams. Thurgood Marshall managed the landmark US Supreme Court case Brown v. Board of Education, in which the Court decided against segregation in public schools. Marshall employed mentor and fraternity brother Charles Houston's plan to use the de facto inequality of "separate but equal" education in the United States to attack and defeat the Jim Crow laws. The actions by Alpha activists provoked death threats to them and their families and exposed their homes as targets for firebombing.

In 1961, Whitney Young became the executive director of the National Urban League. In 1963, the NUL hosted the planning meetings of civil rights leaders for the March on Washington for Jobs and Freedom. The Alpha Phi Alpha delegation was one of the largest to participate in the March on Washington.

In 1968, after the assassination of Martin Luther King Jr., Alpha Phi Alpha proposed erecting a permanent memorial to King in Washington, D.C. The efforts of the fraternity gained momentum in 1986 after King's birthday was designated a national holiday. They collected $100 million for construction.

=== History: 1970–2000 ===
Beginning in the 1970s, new goals were being introduced to address the current environment. The older social programs and policies were still supported; however, under the direction of General President Ernest Morial, the fraternity turned its attention to new social needs. This included the campaign to eliminate the ghetto-goal on numerous fronts with housing development and entrepreneurship initiatives.

In 1963, the Federal Housing Administration requested non-profit organizations to get involved with providing housing for low-income families, individuals, and senior citizens. Alpha Phi Alpha was poised to take advantage of this program with the government in improving urban housing living conditions. The Eta Tau Lambda chapter created Alpha Phi Alpha Homes Inc. with James R. Williams as the chairman to address these needs in Akron, Ohio. In 1971, Alpha Homes received an $11.5 million grant from HUD to begin groundbreaking on Channelwood Village with the Henry Arthur Callis Tower as its centerpiece. Channelwood contains additional structures named after General Presidents James R. Williams and Charles Wesley and streets named for fraternity founders Tandy and Ogle. The Alpha Towers in Chicago and three other urban housing developments in St. Louis, Missouri — the Alpha Gardens, Alpha Towne, and Alpha Village saw completion through Alpha Phi Alpha leadership.

In 1976, the fraternity celebrated its 70th anniversary with dual convention locations: New York City and Monrovia. The fraternity launched the Million Dollar Fund Drive with three prime beneficiaries — the United Negro College Fund, the National Urban League, and the NAACP. The executive director of the NAACP stated, "Alpha Phi Alpha provided the largest single gift ever received by the civil rights group."

In 1981, the fraternity celebrated its Diamond Jubilee in Dallas, Texas, featuring a presentation of the New Thrust Program consisting of the Million Dollar Fund Drive, the Leadership Development and Citizenship Institutes, and the quest to obtain a national holiday for fraternity brother Martin Luther King Jr.

We will go to great lengths to lend our voices, our time, our expertise, and our money to solve the problems that humankind must solve as we move into the 21st century.

— Henry Ponder, 28th General President ΑΦΑ

As the 21st century approached, Alpha Phi Alpha's long-term commitment to the social and economic improvement of humanity remained at the top of its agenda. The fraternity's 28th General President, Henry Ponder, said, "We would like the public to perceive Alpha Phi Alpha as a group of college-trained, professional men who are very much concerned and sensitive to the needs of humankind. We will go to great lengths to lend our voices, our time, our expertise, and our money to solve the problems that humankind must solve as we move into the 21st century."

In 1996, the World Policy Council (WPC) was created as a think tank to expand the fraternity's involvement in politics and social and current policy to encompass important global and world issues. The United States Congress authorized the Secretary of the Interior to permit Alpha Phi Alpha to establish a memorial to Dr. Martin Luther King on Department of Interior lands in the District of Columbia.

=== Twenty-first century ===
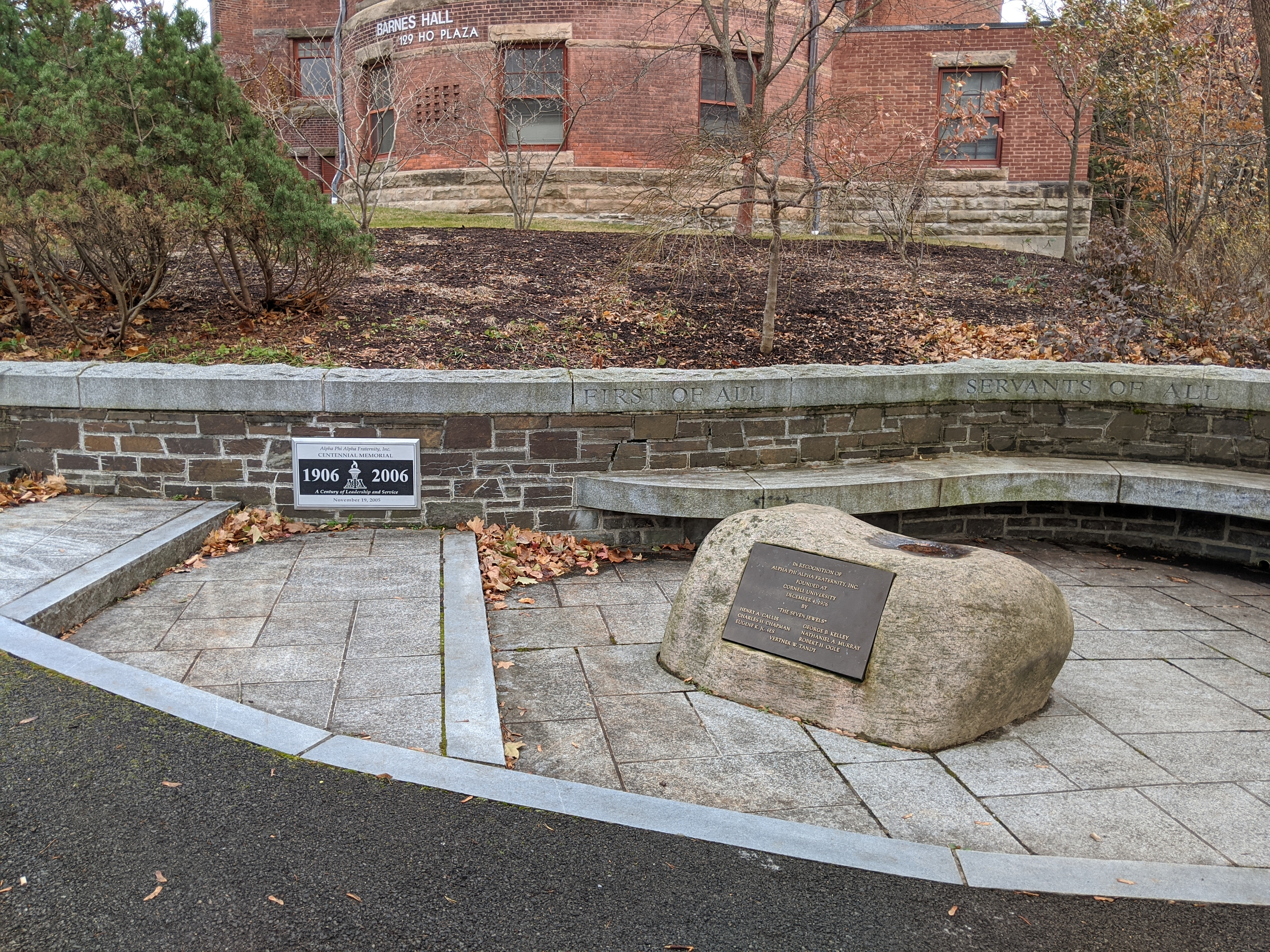
Alpha Phi Alpha and Cornell University dedicated a centennial memorial on Ho Plaza in 2006

In 2006, more than 10,000 Alpha Phi Alpha members gathered in Washington, D.C., to participate in the fraternity's centennial convention to lay the groundwork for another 100 years of service. The fraternity developed a national strategic plan that outlines the processes that Alpha Phi Alpha will utilize in its continuing efforts to develop tomorrow's leaders and promote brotherhood and academic excellence. The Centenary Report of the World Policy Council was published in connection with the centenary of Alpha Phi Alpha.

In 2007, General President Darryl Matthews addressed demonstrators at a protest rally touted as the new civil rights struggle of the 21st century. The rally for six black teenagers, the "Jena 6", was a poignant reminder of incidents that punctuated the civil rights struggles begun in the 1950s.

On the eve of the Inauguration of Barack Obama, the fraternity under the new leadership of 33rd General President Herman "Skip" Mason hosted a Martin Luther King Holiday program at the National Press Club "to honor yesterday's 'firsts'—those in history who paved the way for the nation to be able to celebrate the first African-American president." Alpha Congressman Chaka Fattah said "The life and legacy of Dr. King [was] a predicate for the election of Barack Obama," "The two are inextricably linked." Alpha Phi Alpha responded to President Obama's clarion call to Americans to remake America by implementing a public policy program to focus on saving America's black boys. General President Mason on behalf of the fraternity appealed to President Obama to create a "White House Council on Men and Boys" and partner with Alpha Phi Alpha to specifically address the needs of this group on a national level.

Alpha Phi Alpha responded to the 2010 Haiti earthquake by sending a humanitarian delegation of Alpha men led by President Mason to Haiti on a fact-finding mission to assess the situation and develop a long-term support plan for the Haitian people. The organization views its plan to 'adopt' a school in Haiti as "a great opportunity for the first black intercollegiate fraternity to stand in solidarity with the first independent black Republic."

The fraternity protested the passage of Arizona Senate Bill 1070, which it believes may lead to racial profiling by relocating its 2010 national convention from Phoenix, Arizona, to Las Vegas, Nevada. The bill makes it a misdemeanor state crime for an alien to be in Arizona without carrying legal documents, steps up state and local law enforcement of federal immigration laws, and cracks down on those sheltering, hiring and transporting illegal immigrants. The bill has been called the broadest and strictest anti-illegal immigration measure in decades.

With global expansion as a platform, the fraternity chartered new chapters in the eastern hemisphere at the 2010 National Convention in Las Vegas, NV. The two new chapters are in London, England, and Johannesburg, South Africa, further expanding the fraternity's global footprint.

In 2012, Herman "Skip" Mason was suspended from the fraternity amid allegations of financial improprieties and was summarily removed as General President. Mason filed a lawsuit that contended the board of directors violated the fraternity's constitution and by-laws when it suspended him. The lawsuit requested a temporary restraining order that would have, in effect, reinstated him as general president. This was denied.

== National programs ==
Alpha Phi Alpha asserts that through its community outreach initiatives, the fraternity supplies voice and vision to the struggle of African Americans, the African diaspora, and the countless special problems that affect Black men.

ΑΦΑ National Programs
Mentoring	Project Alpha
Education	Go To High School, Go To College
Leadership Training	Leadership Development Institute
Service	Brother's Keeper

The fraternity provides for charitable endeavors through its Education and Building Foundations, providing academic scholarships and shelter to underprivileged families these projects are managed by fraternity brothers; Broderick McKinney, Kenneth Burnside, and Gregory Anderson. The fraternity combines its efforts in conjunction with other philanthropic organizations such as Head Start, Boy Scouts of America, Big Brothers Big Sisters of America, Project Alpha with the March of Dimes, NAACP, Habitat for Humanity, and Fortune 500 companies.

Alpha's "Designated Charity" benefits from the approximately $10,000, one-time contribution to fund-raising efforts at the fraternity's annual general convention. The fraternity also has made commitments to train leaders with national mentoring programs.

The Washington, D.C. Martin Luther King Jr. National Memorial Project Foundation is a project of Alpha Phi Alpha to construct the Martin Luther King Jr. Memorial on the National Mall in Washington D.C.

=== Go-To-High School, Go-To-College ===
Established in 1922, the Go-To-High School program is intended to afford Alpha men the opportunity to provide young participants with role models. The program concentrates on the importance of completing secondary and collegiate education as a path to advancement and provides information and strategies to facilitate success. Much of the fundraising for the program is done by the graduate and undergraduate chapters at the local level via fraternity specific philanthropic events or collaborations like "The Official Four Way: World Tour" with other fraternal Greek-lettered organizations like Lambda Upsilon Lambda, Iota Nu Delta, and Pi Delta Psi.

=== A Voteless People is a Hopeless People ===
The Fraternity's voter education/registration program was initiated as a National Program of Alpha during the 1930s by the Alpha Omicron chapter (Johnson C. Smith University) when many African Americans had the right to vote but were prevented from voting because of poll taxes, threats of reprisal, and lack of education about the voting process. Voter education and registration have since remained a dominant focus in the fraternity's planning. In the 1990s, the focus shifted to the promotion of political awareness and empowerment, delivered most often through the use of town meetings and candidate forums. Members are required to be registered voters and to participate in the national voter registration program.

The fraternity's Nu Mu Lambda, chapter of Decatur, Georgia, held a voter registration drive in DeKalb County, Georgia in 2004, from which Georgia Secretary of State Cathy Cox rejected all 63 voter registration applications on the basis that the fraternity did not follow correct procedures, including obtaining specific pre-clearance from the state to conduct their drive.

Nu Mu Lambda filed Charles H. Wesley Education Foundation v. Cathy Cox on the basis that the Georgia Secretary of State's long-standing policy and practice of rejecting mail-in voter registration applications that were submitted in bundles and/or by persons other than registrars, deputy registrars, or the individual applicants, violated the requirements of the National Voter Registration Act of 1993 (NVRA) by undermining voter registration drives. A Senior U.S. District Judge upheld earlier federal court decisions in the case, which also found private entities have a right under the NVRA to engage in organized voter registration activity in Georgia at times and locations of their choosing, without the presence or permission of state or local election officials.

=== Project Alpha ===
Alpha Phi Alpha, Iota Delta Lambda Chapter (Chicago), and the March of Dimes began a collaborative program called Project Alpha in 1980. The project consists of a series of workshops and informational sessions conducted by Alpha Phi Alpha fraternity brothers to provide young men with current and accurate information about teen pregnancy prevention. Alpha Phi Alpha also participated in the March of Dimes' WalkAmerica and raised over $181,000 in 2006.

== Special Initiatives ==
=== Martin Luther King Jr. Memorial ===
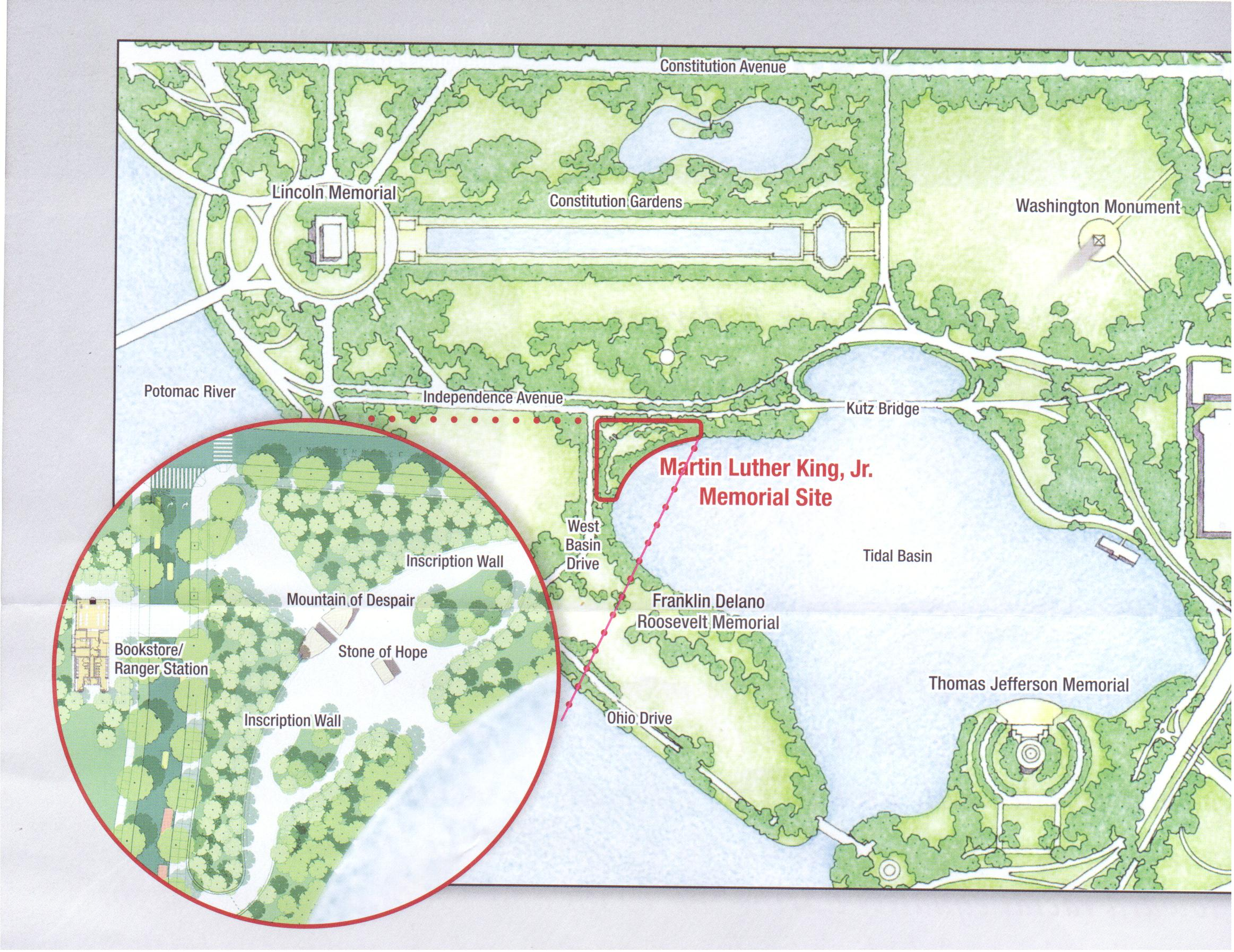
Memorial site, shown in relation to areas including the National Mall, West Potomac Park, and the Tidal Basin

The Martin Luther King Jr. Memorial is a Fraternity special project that was a result of an early effort of Alpha Phi Alpha fraternity to erect a monument to Dr. King. King was initiated into the organization via Sigma Chapter on June 22, 1952, while he was attending Boston University. King remained involved with the fraternity after the completion of his studies, including delivering the keynote speech at the fraternity's 50th-anniversary banquet in 1956. In 1968, after King's assassination, Alpha Phi Alpha proposed erecting a permanent memorial to King in Washington, D.C. The fraternity's efforts gained momentum in 1986 after King's birthday was designated a national holiday.

In 1996, the United States Congress authorized the Secretary of the Interior to permit Alpha Phi Alpha to establish a memorial on Department of Interior lands in the District of Columbia, giving the fraternity until November 2003 to raise $100 million and break ground. In 1998, Congress authorized the fraternity to establish a foundation—the Washington, D.C. Martin Luther King Jr. National Memorial Project Foundation—to manage the memorial's fundraising and design, and approved the building of the memorial on the National Mall. In 1999, the United States Commission of Fine Arts (CFA) and the National Capital Planning Commission (NCPC) approved the site location for the memorial.

The memorial's design, by ROMA Design Group, a San Francisco-based architecture firm, was selected out of 900 candidates from 52 countries. On December 4, 2000, a marble and bronze plaque was laid by Alpha Phi Alpha to dedicate the site where the memorial was to be built. Soon thereafter, a full-time fundraising team began the fundraising and promotional campaign for the memorial. A ceremonial groundbreaking for the memorial was held on November 13, 2006, in West Potomac Park.

In August 2008, the foundation's leaders estimated the memorial would take 20 months to complete with a total cost of US$120 million. As of December 2008, the foundation had raised approximately $108 million, including substantial contributions from such donors as the Bill and Melinda Gates Foundation, The Walt Disney Company Foundation, the National Association of Realtors, and filmmaker George Lucas. The figure also includes $10 million in matching funds provided by the United States Congress. The memorial opened to the public on August 22, 2011, after more than two decades of planning, fund-raising, and construction.

=== World Policy Council ===
General President Milton C. Davis established the World Policy Council in 1996 as a nonprofit and nonpartisan think tank with a mission as stated in its centenary report "to address issues of concern to our brotherhood, our communities, our Nation, and the world."

The council is headed by Ambassador Horace Dawson and communicates its position through white papers which is disseminated to policymakers, politicians, scholars, journalists, and chapters of the fraternity. Since its founding the council has issued five reports on topics such as the AIDS crisis, Middle East conflict, and Nigerian politics. The fifth report was published in 2006 and examines the Millennium Challenge, Hurricane Katrina and extraordinary rendition.

== Chapters ==
As of 2023, Alpha Phi Alpha has chartered 979 alumni and college chapters; 686 chapters are active in the United States, the Bahamas, Bermuda, Canada, Germany, Liberia, Korea, South Africa, and the Virgin Islands.

== Membership ==
Alpha Phi Alpha's membership is predominantly African-American in composition with brothers in over 680 college and graduate chapters in the United States, the District of Columbia, the Caribbean, Bermuda, Europe, Asia, and Africa. Since its founding in 1906, more than 290,000 men have joined the membership of Alpha Phi Alpha, and a large percentage of leadership within the African-American community in the 20th century originated from the ranks of the fraternity.

John A. Williams wrote in his book The King that God Did Not Save, which was a commentary on the life of Alpha Phi Alpha member Martin Luther King Jr., "a man clawing out his status does not stop at education. There are attendant titles he must earn. A fraternity is one of them." The mystique of belonging to a Greek letter group still attracts college students in large numbers despite lawsuits that have threatened the very existence of some fraternities and sororities.

=== Initial Membership Development Process (IMDP) ===
The period in which a candidate for membership in the fraternity enes before applying and being initiated as a member. This period is the time the candidate learns the organization's history, objectives, aims, and the tenacity of brotherhood.

As of June 2013, the fraternity only inducts members through the Initial Membership Development Process (IMDP), and all membership development activities for the fraternity are overseen by the National Membership Services Director and conducted by regionally appointed Chief Deans. The fraternity has abolished pledging and pledge "lines" as a means of obtaining membership in Alpha Phi Alpha. Aspirants must not submit themselves, or agree to submit themselves, to any membership activities that are prohibited by the fraternity. Individuals involved in hazing face severe disciplinary action by the fraternity and are referred to the local legal authorities.

There are periods in the history of the fraternity where hazing was involved in certain pledge lines. The fraternity has never condoned hazing but has been aware of problems with "rushing" and "initiations" dated as far back as the 1934 General Convention when the fraternity founders communicated their concern with physical violence during initiation ceremonies. At the 1940 General Convention, a pledge manual was discussed that would contain a brief general history, the list of chapters and locations, the achievements of Alpha men, outstanding Alpha men, and pledge procedures.

In 2001 and 2007, the chapters at Ohio State University and Oklahoma State University–Stillwater were suspended for two and five years, respectively, for hazing and incidents involving prospective members injured seriously enough to require medical care. In 2010, the fraternity suspended new membership intake indefinitely in response to hazing activities in 2009 that again caused pledges to be hospitalized. In 2012, the University of Florida chapter of Alpha Phi Alpha was also accused of hazing. The allegations claimed that members of the Alpha Phi Alpha fraternity repeatedly struck and paddled pledges hard enough to cause bruises, and one pledge was paddled so hard that he was unable to sleep on his back for several nights.

In the selection of candidates for membership, certain chapters had not escaped challenges of racial stereotyping and allegations of colorism. In a biography of Justice Thurgood Marshall, the authors recounted how certain chapters of the fraternity used a "brown paper bag test" and would not consider students whose skin color was darker than the bag. General President Belford Lawson Jr. lamented this attitude and condemned initiation practices of snobbery and exclusivity, and said "Jesus Christ could not make Alpha Phi Alpha Fraternity today; they would blackball Him because He was not hot enough."

The fraternity once provided classifications for honorary and exalted honorary membership. Honorary members include Vice President Hubert Humphrey (who is Caucasian), jazz musician Duke Ellington, and activist W. E. B. Du Bois. Frederick Douglass is distinguished as the only member initiated posthumously when he became an exalted honorary member of the fraternity's Omega chapter in 1921. The Fraternity no longer has honorary membership, a practice that stopped in the 1960s.

== Notable members ==
First African American accomplishments by Alpha Phi Alpha men
Dennis Archer	President – American Bar Association
Richard Arrington	Mayor – Birmingham, Alabama
Edward Brooke	State Attorney General, U.S. Senator since Reconstruction
Willie Brown	Mayor – San Francisco, California
Emanuel Cleaver	Mayor – Kansas City, Missouri
E. Franklin Frazier	President – American Sociological Association
Malvin Goode	Reporter – American Broadcasting Company
Samuel Gravely	Commandant of a U.S. Fleet
Charles Hamilton Houston	Editor – Harvard Law Review
David Dinkins	Mayor – New York, N.Y.
Maynard Jackson	Mayor – Atlanta, Georgia
Ted Berry	Mayor – Cincinnati, Ohio
John Johnson	Forbes 400
Ernest Morial	Mayor – New Orleans, Louisiana
Thurgood Marshall	Justice – U.S. Supreme Court
Samuel Pierce	Board member of Fortune 500 company
Fritz Pollard	Head coach – National Football League
Chuck Stone	President – National Association of Black Journalists
Otha E. Thornton Jr.	President – National Parent Teacher Association

The fraternity's membership roster includes activist Dick Gregory, Princeton Professor Cornel West, Congressman Charles B. Rangel, Department of Housing and Urban Development Secretary Samuel Pierce, celebrity physician Corey Hébert, entrepreneur John Johnson, athlete Mike Powell, musician Donny Hathaway, United Nations Ambassador Andrew Young, the first Premier of Bermuda Sir Edward T. Richards, and Atlanta Mayor Maynard Jackson.

Roland Burris became the only black member of the 2009 U.S. Senate when he assumed the seat vacated by President Barack Obama.

Alpha men were instrumental in the founding and leadership of the NAACP (Du Bois), People's National Party (PNP) Norman Manley, Association for the Study of African American Life and History (ASALH) (Jesse E. Moorland), UNCF (Frederick D. Patterson), and the SCLC (King, Walker and Jemison). The National Urban League has had eight leaders in its more than 100 years of existence; six of its leaders are Alpha men: George Haynes, Eugene K. Jones, Lester Granger, Whitney Young, Hugh Price and Marc Morial.

From the ranks of the fraternity have come several pioneers in various fields. Honorary member Kelly Miller was the first African American to be admitted to Johns Hopkins University. Todd Duncan was the first actor to play "Porgy" in Porgy and Bess. During the Washington run of Porgy and Bess in 1936, the cast — as led by Todd Duncan — protested the audience's segregation. Duncan stated that he "would never play in a theater that barred him from purchasing tickets to certain seats because of his race." Eventually, management would give in to the demands and allow for the first integrated performance at the National Theatre.

Charles Hamilton Houston, a Harvard Law School graduate and a law professor at Howard University, first began a campaign in the 1930s to challenge racial discrimination in the federal courts. Houston's campaign to fight Jim Crow Laws began with Plessy v. Ferguson and culminated in a unanimous Supreme Court decision in Brown v. Board of Education.

Norris B. Herndon, Charles Hamilton Houston's fellow 1921 initiate at Alpha Phi Alpha's Sigma Chapter, became the second President of the historic Atlanta Life Insurance Company. Herndon's father, honorary Alpha Alonzo Herndon, founded Atlanta Life in 1905, becoming Atlanta, Georgia's first African-American millionaire. Atlanta Life is notable for both its financial support of the Civil Rights Movement and owning the first insurance policy for Dr. Martin Luther King Jr.

Ron Dellums's campaign to end the racist, apartheid policies of South Africa succeeded when the House of Representatives passed Dellums's anti-apartheid Comprehensive Anti-Apartheid Act calling for a trade embargo against South Africa and immediate divestment by American corporations.^{[d]}

Martin Luther King Jr. was a Nobel Peace Prize laureate, awarded "to the person who shall have done the most or the best work for fraternity between the nations, for the abolition or reduction of standing armies and the holding and promotion of peace congresses." The Presidential Medal of Freedom, designed to recognize individuals who have made "an especially meritorious contribution to the security or national interests of the United States, world peace, cultural or other significant public or private endeavors", has been awarded to many members including Edward Brooke and William Coleman. The Congressional Gold Medal, the highest civilian award of the United States Congress, was awarded to Jesse Owens and Vice President Hubert Humphrey. The Spingarn Medal, awarded annually by the NAACP for outstanding achievement by a Black American, has been awarded to brothers John Hope Franklin, Rayford Logan, and numerous fraternity members.

Premier Norman Manley was a Rhodes Scholar (1914), awarded annually by the Oxford-based Rhodes Trust based on academic achievement and character. Randal Pinkett, Andrew Zawacki, and Westley Moore are other Rhodes Scholar recipients.

Several buildings and monuments have been named after Alpha men, such as the Eddie Robinson Stadium, Ernest N. Morial Convention Center, Hartsfield-Jackson Atlanta International Airport, Baltimore-Washington International Thurgood Marshall Airport, Whitney Young Memorial Bridge, and the W. E. B. Du Bois Library at the University of Massachusetts Amherst. The United States Postal Service has honored fraternity members W. E. B. Du Bois, Duke Ellington, Martin Luther King Jr., Thurgood Marshall, Paul Robeson, and Whitney Young with a commemorative stamp in their Black Heritage Stamp series.

=== General presidents ===
- Moses A. Morrison, 1908–1909
- Roscoe C. Giles, 1910
- Frederick H. Miller, 1911
- Charles H. Garvin, 1912–1914
- Henry L. Dickason, 1914–1915
- Henry A. Callis, 1915
- Howard H. Long, 1916–1917
- William A. Pollard, 1917–1918
- Daniel D. Fowler, 1919
- Lucius L. McGee, 1920
- Simeon S. Booker, 1921–1923
- Raymond W. Cannon, 1924–1927
- Bert A. Rose, 1928–1931
- Charles H. Wesley, 1932–1940
- Rayford W. Logan, 1941–1945
- Belford V. Lawson Jr., 1946–1951
- Antonio M. Smith, 1952–1954
- Frank L. Stanley, 1955–1957
- Myles A. Paige, 1957–1960
- William H. Hale, 1961–1962
- T. Winston Cole Sr., 1963–1964
- Lionel H. Newsom, 1965–1968
- Ernest N. Morial, 1968–1972
- Walter Washington, 1973–1976
- James R. Williams, 1977–1980
- Ozell Sutton, 1981–1984
- Charles C. Teamer, 1985–1988
- Henry Ponder, 1989–1992
- Milton C. Davis, 1993–1996
- Adrian L. Wallace, 1997–2000
- Harry E. Johnson, 2001–2004
- Darryl R. Matthews Sr. 2005–2008
- Herman "Skip" Mason Jr., 2009 – April 2012
- Aaron Crutison Sr. (acting), April 2012 – December 2012
- Mark S. Tillman, 2013–2016
- Everett B. Ward, 2017–2020
- Willis L. Lonzer, III, 2021–2024
- Lucien J. Metellus, Jr., 2025–present

== Regions ==
Alpha Phi Alpha divides its chapters into regions across the United States and internationally. There are five major regions currently: Eastern, Midwestern, Southern, Southwestern, and Western. Every U.S. state in a region is further designated as a "district" of that region. Each region comprises both collegiate and alumni chapters, with the latter designated by the Greek letter Lambda. Since its inception, Alpha Phi Alpha has chartered 414 college chapters and 369 alumni chapters.

== Egyptian symbolism ==
Alpha Phi Alpha utilizes motifs from Ancient Egypt and uses images and songs depicting the Her-em-akhet (Great Sphinx of Giza), pharaohs, and other Egyptian artifacts to represent the organization. The Great Sphinx of Giza was made out of one unified body of stone which represents the fraternity and its members. This is in contrast to other fraternities that traditionally echo themes from the golden age of Ancient Greece. Alpha's constant reference to Ethiopia in hymns and poems are further examples of Alpha's mission to imbue itself with an African cultural heritage. Fraternity brother Charles H. Wesley wrote, "To the Alpha Phi Alpha brotherhood, African history and civilization, the Sphinx, and Ethiopian tradition bring new meanings, and these are interpreted with new significance to others." The Great Pyramids of Giza, symbols of foundation, sacred geometry, and more, are other African images chosen by Alpha Phi Alpha as fraternity icons.

The fraternity's 21st General President, Thomas W. Cole said, "Alpha Phi Alpha must go back to her ultimate roots; only then can she be nurtured to full bloom." Fraternity members make pilgrimages to its spiritual birthplaces of Egypt to walk across the sands of the Giza Plateau to the Great Sphinx of Giza and the Great Pyramids of Giza, and Ethiopia.

== Centennial celebration ==
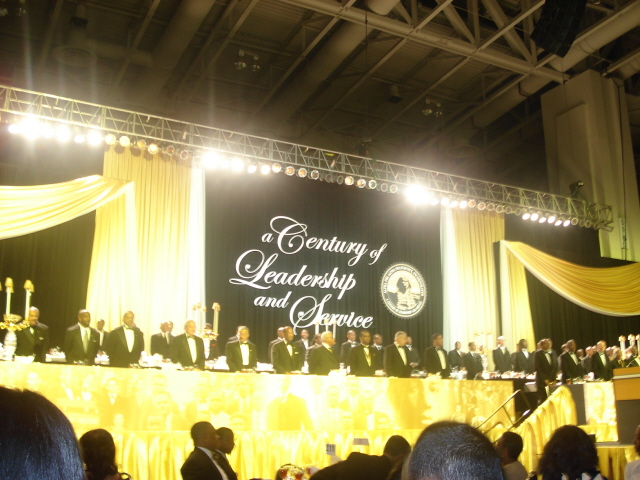
Alpha Phi Alpha board members at the centennial banquet, July 2006 in Washington, D.C.

Alpha Phi Alpha declared 2006 the beginning of its "Centennial Era" as it readied for its Centenary, framed by the slogan "First of All, Servants of All, We Shall Transcend All". These preparations consisted of nationwide activities and events, including the commissioning of intellectual and scholarly works, presentation of exhibits, lectures, artwork, and musical expositions, the production of film and video presentations, and a Centennial Convention July 25–30, 2006, in Washington, D.C.

The 2006 Centennial Celebration Kickoff launched with a "pilgrimage" to Cornell University on November 19, 2005. That event brought over 700 fraternity members who gathered for a day-long program. Members journeyed across campus and unveiled a new centennial memorial to Alpha Phi Alpha. The memorial—a wall in the form of a "J" in recognition of the Jewels — features a bench and a plaque and is situated in front of the university's Barnes Hall.

Alpha Phi Alpha Men: A Century of Leadership is a historical documentary on Alpha Phi Alpha's century of leadership and service. The film premiered in February 2006 on PBS as part of the 2006 Black History Month theme, "Celebrating Community: A Tribute to Black Fraternal, Social and Civic Institutions." In 2009, the fraternity donated its repository of interviews with prominent Alpha members that were collected for the documentary to Cornell University Library.

The centennial convention began on Capitol Hill with Congressman and fraternity member David Scott stating to the House of Representatives, "This week men from every discipline and geographic location convene to chart and plan for the fraternity's future, celebrate its 100th anniversary, and reinvigorate its founding principles of scholarship, fellowship, good character, and the uplifting of humanity." The House of Representatives passed House Concurrent Resolution 384, approved 422–0, which recognized and honored Alpha Phi Alpha as the first intercollegiate Greek-letter fraternity established for African Americans, its accomplishments and its historic milestone.

The resolution was co-sponsored by the eight members of the House of Representatives who are members of Alpha Phi Alpha, which included Emanuel Cleaver, Robert Scott and Chaka Fattah. While in Washington, fraternity members such as National Urban League head Marc Morial and Congressman Gregory Meeks witnessed the renewal of the Voting Rights Act of 1965 by President George W. Bush in a signing ceremony at the White House. A tribute to Martin Luther King Jr. with an hour-long reflection at the site of the King Memorial was witnessed by Alpha's General President(s) and a host of the fraternity members assembled for the convention. Grammy Award winning singer Lionel Richie gave a performance for his fraternity at the John F. Kennedy Center.

The House of Alpha, the Centennial Exhibit of Alpha Phi Alpha, opened its doors at the convention. Herman "Skip" Mason served as curator of the exhibit, which has been described as a "fraternal masterpiece." The featured materials are part of the records of Alpha Phi Alpha, local chapters, and the personal collections of fraternity members. Mason was inaugurated as the fraternity's 33rd General President in January 2009.

== Black college Greek movement ==
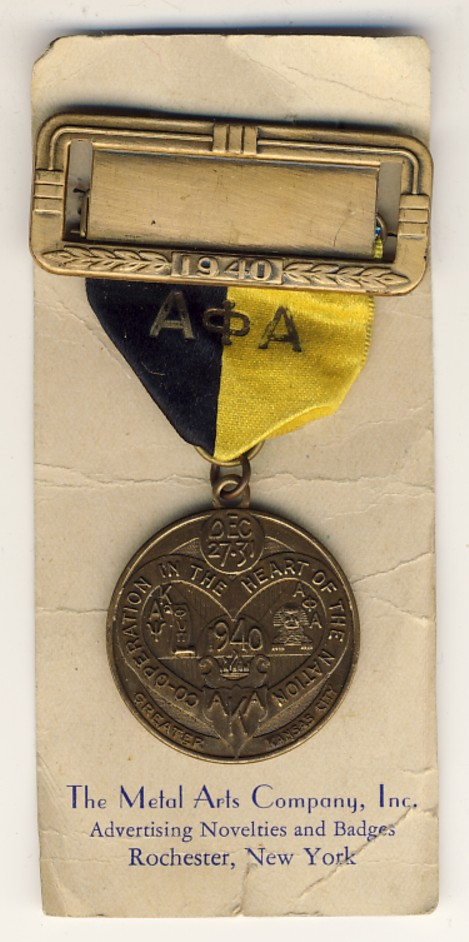
Alpha Phi Alpha delegate's pin from the 1940 Pan-Hellenic convention of ΑΚΑ, ΑΦΑ and ΚΑΨ

Members of black fraternities and sororities call themselves Greek because "Greece was a culturally diverse pluralistic society of various ethnic and racial groups—much like the United States of today. However, the citizens were mostly dark-skinned black and brown people" according to journalists and Alpha Phi Alpha brother Tony Brown.

Alpha Phi Alpha is the first intercollegiate Greek-lettered fraternity in the United States established for people of African descent, and the paragon for the Black Greek Letter Organizations (BGLOs) that followed. Alpha Kappa Alpha was founded in 1908 at Howard University as both the first African-American sorority and the first BGLO founded at a black college. Four other BGLOs were in quick succession founded at Howard: Omega Psi Phi (1911), Delta Sigma Theta (1913), Phi Beta Sigma (1914) and Zeta Phi Beta (1920). Kappa Alpha Psi was founded at Indiana University in 1911. Sigma Gamma Rho (1922) and Iota Phi Theta (1963) were founded at Butler University and Morgan State University, respectively.

In 1940, Alpha Phi Alpha, Alpha Kappa Alpha, and Kappa Alpha Psi hosted conventions in the Municipal Auditorium of Kansas City, Missori and held a historic joint BGLO session.

== Embezzlement and hazing controversies ==
=== Embezzlement ===
In 2012, the 33rd General President of the fraternity, Reverend Herman "Skip" Mason, admitted to misappropriating fraternity funds, resulting in his immediate removal by the board of the fraternity. He admitted using unsanctioned fraternity funds to cover personal expenses, including paying for his children's private school tuition. Mason sued the board of the fraternity for violating organization by-laws and harming his reputation. Mason's lawsuit was denied.

In 2012, fraternity member Curtiss Stanford was arrested and charged with three counts of embezzlement. He illegally wrote 10 checks totaling about $1,200 from the Appalachian State University chapter's bank account.

In 2020, Guy Bell, fraternity member and treasurer of the Baltimore City-Wide graduate chapter, was sentenced for stealing $56,678.93 from the chapter between 2013 and 2016 to help cover personal debts. The chapter was behind on rent payments and other important financial obligations. Bell was sentenced to six months of home detention, five years of probation, and must pay back $51,834 in restitution.

=== Hazing ===
In 1989, Joel Harris, an eighteen-year-old Alpha Phi Alpha aspirant and student at Morehouse College, died following suspected hazing. The Cobb County medical examiner's report "didn't declare the hazing to be a 'direct cause' of Joel's death, but it stated that he was 'under an intensive amount of anxiety and stress' that night. It was reported that Harris had been punched in the chest and slapped in the face multiple times as part of a so-called "thunder and lightning" ritual hours before his death.

In 1992, Gregory R. Batipps, age 20, a student at the University of Virginia, died in a car accident after falling asleep at the wheel. Hazing was investigated as a factor in his death, as he was pledging Alpha Phi Alpha.

In 1995, a pledge seeking to join the fraternity's founding chapter, the Alpha chapter at Cornell University, developed a "life-threatening infection in his buttocks" after being paddled repeatedly. He sued the fraternity for $2 million, and the fraternity was banned from campus for several years for violating the school's code of conduct.

In 2003, a 21-year-old pledge at Southern Methodist University (SMU) went into a coma after being coerced to drink large amounts of water in an Alpha Phi Alpha initiation ritual. The chapter was temporarily expelled from campus, and eight Alpha Phi Alpha members were indicted on felony aggravated assault charges. In 2006, the first trial in the case, of Raymond Lee (SMU fraternity member), resulted in a conviction and a sentence to 180 days in jail, ten years of probation, and a $10,000 fine.

In 2008, Mcandy Douarin, age 26, a student at the University of Central Florida (UCF), died from "heart-related failure less than 12 hours after a punch to his chest". Douarin shared with his family that he was frequently punched in the chest by members of Alpha Phi Alpha as part of the pledging process, and his family released photos of bruises on his chest to validate that was the reason why he died. UCF students released photos and statements substantiating that Douarin was pledging to the fraternity, but the university refused to launch an investigation into any allegations against them after the fraternity stated Douarin had not officially applied for membership. The family hired an attorney to help hold the fraternity accountable for his death.

In 2009, a fraternity member at Fort Valley State University was arrested and charged with felony aggravated battery for hospitalizing a pledge with acute renal failure.

In 2010, the fraternity was banned from the campus of Mercer University for three years for hazing. Pledges were sleep-deprived, paddled, and forced into a strict diet.

In 2010, Alpha Phi Alpha suspended membership intake "after decades of hazing-related controversies plaguing Black Greek Letter Organizations despite their anti-hazing/anti-pledging policies."

In 2011, Emory University suspended the fraternity for four years due to several hazing violations.

In 2013, 15 Alpha Phi Alpha members pleaded guilty to reckless endangerment charges arising from off-campus hazing at Jacksonville State University in 2011, in which pledges were beaten, humiliated, hospitalized, and forced to drink toxic drinks until they vomited. The members involved were all sentenced to 365 days in jail. One of the pledges filed a civil suit against the fraternity.

In 2013, four Alpha Phi Alpha members were arrested and pleaded guilty to severely beating pledges (a misdemeanor charge) and violating Virginia State University's code of conduct.

In 2014, a $3 million lawsuit was filed against the fraternity by a former pledge who was subject to humiliation and abuse. While pledging at Bowie State University, it was reported that he endured verbal assaults, punches, slaps, paddling, and body slams consistently.

In 2014, six Alpha Phi Alpha men at the University of Akron were arrested and charged with assault for severely beating pledges. One known pledge was hospitalized due to excessive bleeding.

In 2014, the University of Tennessee at Knoxville suspended the fraternity for paddling and pouring hot sauce on the genitals of pledges. The fraternity was placed on suspension until August 2016.

Bradley Doyley, a senior and basketball player at Buffalo State College, was pronounced dead allegedly from a hazing-related pledging ritual on January 29, 2016. Family and friends reported that Doyley was asked to drink an unidentified toxic cocktail off campus by members of Alpha Phi Alpha, which caused him to suddenly vomit blood. Doyley was taken to a local hospital for emergency surgery, and he later died. The college suspended the chapter connected with the death of Doyley. A report published, citing a preliminary autopsy and unnamed police sources, stated that "there is no evidence of hazing in the death last week of a student at Buffalo State College in New York." The family's attorney dismissed the claim hazing was not involved in Doyley's death.

In 2016, Virginia Tech banned the fraternity until 2026 for misconduct and severely abusing pledges. One known pledge was hospitalized due to beatings he endured, although this decision was later reversed, and the fraternity was allowed to return to campus in 2021.

In 2018, Tyler Hillard, a student at the University of California at Riverside, died while pledging the fraternity. Tyler went with other pledges and members of the fraternity to Mount Rubidoux, where the ambulance was called to pick him up and take him to the hospital before his death. Authorities found convincing evidence that hazing was the reason for his death. Charges were expected to be filed against several members of the fraternity following an investigation.

In 2018, the chapter at the University of Mississippi was suspended for three years due to university-wide investigations into Greek hazing.

In 2021, the chapter at Southern University - Baton Rouge was placed on suspension after two students were hospitalized due to hazing.

== Publications ==
The history, leadership, membership, activities, and continued progress of Alpha Phi Alpha Fraternity, Incorporated has been documented in several publications.

Publication year	Title	Author
1925,1997	Henry Arthur Callis: Life & Legacy	Wesley, Charles H.
1929, 2008	The History of Alpha Phi Alpha: A Development in College Life (History Book, Volume I)	Wesley, Charles H.
1997	The Talented Tenth: Biographical Sketches of the Seven "Jewels" of Alpha Phi Alpha Fraternity, Inc	Mason, Herman
1999	The Talented Tenth: The Founders and Presidents of Alpha	Mason, Herman
2006	Centennial Book of Essays and Letters: Excerpts from the Brotherhood of Alpha Phi Alpha Fraternity, Inc	Alpha Phi Alpha Fraternity
2006	Jewels: The Story of the Founding of Alpha Phi Alpha Fraternity	Gourdine, Darrius J.
2012	Alpha Phi Alpha: A Legacy of Greatness, The Demands of Transcendence	Parks, Gregory and Stefan M. Bradley
2014	Eugene Kinckle Jones: The National Urban League and Black Social Work, 1910-1940	Armfield, Felix L.
2014	The History of Alpha Phi Alpha: A Tradition of Leadership and Service (History Book, Volume II)	Harris, Robert L.
2016	Jewels: Town Hall Meeting	Gourdine, Darrius
2017	The History of Alpha Phi Alpha: Origins of the Eastern Region	Brown, Paul E., Dr. Matthews Jr., Lopez D., Nickens IV, Frederick, and Mills, R. Anthony
2019	The History of Alpha Phi Alpha Delta Lambda Chapter: A Century of Leadership	Matthews Jr., Lopez D., Mills, R. Anthony, and Durham, Joseph T.

== Documentary films ==
- Alpha Phi Alpha Men: A Century of Leadership, 2006, producer/directors: Alamerica Bank/Rubicon Productions

== See also ==
- College fraternities and sororities
- Hancock House (Bluefield, West Virginia)
- List of African-American Greek and fraternal organizations
- List of Alpha Phi Alpha national conventions
- List of social fraternities
- List of hazing deaths
- Sphinx

== Notes ==
- a. The NNA estimated that by 1940, the group had secured 5,106 jobs for blacks because businesses could not afford to lose sales during the Depression.
- b. South Africa formally excluded Walvis Bay from the mandate and annexed it as a South African enclave. It took until after the date for the first fully democratic elections in South Africa in 1994 had been set before sovereignty over Walvis Bay was formally transferred to Namibia at midnight on February 28, 1994.
- c. Darryl R. Matthews Sr., 32nd General President of the fraternity, defined a pilgrimage as "a personal, spiritual, historic and significant journey, which one takes to a place and for a purpose that has profound meaning to that individual."
- d. President Ronald Reagan vetoed The Comprehensive Anti-Apartheid Act of 1986; however, Congress' override of his veto was the first presidential foreign policy veto in the 20th century.
