= George Kelly =

George Kelly may refer to:

== Entertainment ==
- George Kelly (musician) (1915–1998), American jazz tenor saxophonist, vocalist, arranger and bandleader
- George Kelly (playwright) (1887–1974), American dramatist
- Fowokan (George Kelly, born 1943), Jamaica-born British visual artist
- George M. Kelly (born 1952), New York sculptor who created a George Washington bronze for the Millennium Gate museum in Atlanta

== Sports ==
- George A. Kelly (1883–1969), American football coach in the United States
- George Kelly (baseball) (1895–1984), American first baseman; played 1915–1932
- George Kelly (boxer), Irish boxer who competed at the 1928 Summer Olympics in Amsterdam
- George Kelly (footballer) (1933–1998), footballer who played for Cardiff City, Stockport County and Stoke City

== Other ==
- George Kelly (Jacobite) (c.1680–1762), Irish agent of Charles Edward Stuart
- George Kelly (psychologist) (1905–1967), American personality theorist and professor at Ohio State University
- George B. Kelly (1900–1971), Democratic member of the United States House of Representatives from New York
- George Kelly (British Army officer) (1880–1938)
- George E. M. Kelly (1878–1911), American Army 2nd lieutenant; namesake of San Antonio's Kelly Field Annex
- Mike Kelly (Pennsylvania politician) (George Joseph Kelly Jr., born 1948), member of the U.S. House of Representatives
- George Armstrong Kelly (1932–1987, political theorist, professor and scholar on the works of Hegel

== See also ==
- George Kelley (disambiguation)
- George Kelly Scott (born 1966), Liberia-born Swedish boxer
- George Kelly Barnes (1895–1954), American gangster, bootlegger and kidnapper
