= Charles Henry Chapman (academic) =

American academic and fraternity founder

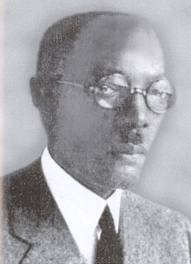
- Born: June 20, 1876; Cayuga County, New York, U.S.
- Died: November 17, 1934 (aged 64); Tallahassee, Florida, U.S.
- Known for: Founder of Alpha Phi Alpha fraternity

Academic background
- Education: Howard University Cornell University; Hampton University Ohio State University

Academic work
- Discipline: Agriculture
- Sub-discipline: Animal husbandry
- Institutions: Jackson State College Alabama A&M University Florida A&M University

Charles Henry Chapman (June 20, 1876 – November 17, 1934) was an American academic and one of the founders of Alpha Phi Alpha, the first Greek letter fraternity for African American men. He is known for advancing agricultural education and fraternal organizations.

== Early life ==
Chapman was born On June 20, 1876, in Cayuga County, New York. By 1880, he lived in Ontario, New York with his maternal grandfather, George Thompson,

He attended Howard University around 1900. He enrolled at Cornell University in 1905 and studied agriculture. While attending Cornell, he owned a cafe and a small brickyard. Chapman also attended Hampton Institute and, later, attended Ohio State University.

== Alpha Phi Alpha ==
While attending Cornell, Chapman was one of the seven founders of the Alpha Phi Alpha fraternity on December 4, 1906. The founders are commonly referred to as Jewels. During the formation of what became the Alpha chapter, he was the first chairman of the Committees on Initiation and Organization.

Chapman gave the Founders Address at the fraternity's 22nd General Convention in December 1929. He said, "There never was a more beautiful episode in my life than the small part I played in the organization of the fraternity in 1906." He helped start the fraternity's Beta Nu chapter in 1932 while he was teaching at Florida A&M University.

When he died. Chapman became the first Jewel to enter the Omega chapter—a memorial chapter that contains the names of deceased fraternity members.

== Career ==
Chapman entered a career in higher education as a professor of agriculture at Jackson State College and Alabama A&M University. He began teaching at what is now Florida A&M University (FAMU) in 1923, becoming chair of the agriculture department in 1924. He expanded the FAMU curriculum to include animal husbandry. He also developed herds of prize dairy cows. He remained at FAMU until his death.

== Honors ==
- In 1952, Governor Fuller Warren dedicated a new dairy facility at Florida A&M University in Chapman's honor.
- The Beta Phi Lambda chapter of Alpha Phi Alpha established the Charles Henry Chapman Memorial Garden, a community garden, in his honor.

== Personal life ==
Chapman married Esther, a dietician with the Cleveland Public School District in Ohio. The couple lived in Cleveland, Ohio. When he secured teaching positions in the South, Esther remained in Cleveland where Chapman would visit her.

In 1934 following two weeks of illness, Chapman died in the Florida A&M hospital from nephritis at the age of 64. He was buried near Florida A&M. On November 22, funeral services were held in the university's auditorium with noticeable a Alpha Phi Alpha presence. He was buried in Oakland Cemetery in Tallahassee, Florida.
