= Milton C. Davis =

American lawyer

- Born: Milton Carver Davis
- Education: Tuskegee University; University of Iowa College of Law
- Occupation: Lawyer
- Title: Assistant Attorney General for Alabama

Milton Carver Davis is an American lawyer who researched and advocated for the pardon of Clarence Norris, the last surviving Scottsboro Boy.

Davis graduated from Tuskegee University in 1971 and received his J.D. degree in 1974 from the University of Iowa College of Law. He was an American Political Science Foundation Graduate Fellow, a Ford Foundation Graduate Fellow and a Herbert Lehman Foundation International Scholar.

He gained international acclaim when as the Assistant Attorney General for Alabama he partnered with Donald Watkins to research and advocate for a full pardon of Clarence Norris, the last known surviving Scottsboro Boy on the basis on innocence. Governor George Wallace granted the parole in 1976 as the first time in the state's history that a pardon had been granted based upon innocence.

Davis was the 29th General President of Alpha Phi Alpha, the first intercollegiate organization established for blacks. Davis was chairman of the Fraternity's 2006 Centennial celebration and observance. Davis created the fraternity's World Policy Council in 1996 as a think tank to expand the organization's involvement in politics and social and current policy to encompass important global and world issues. The World Policy Council has published white papers on the Politics of Nigeria, war on terrorism, Hurricane Katrina, Millennium Challenge Account, and Extraordinary Rendition.

== Personal life ==
Davis is a devout Catholic.

Preceded by Henry Ponder	General President of Alpha Phi Alpha; 1993–1996	Succeeded by Adrian L. Wallace
