= Charles Herbert Garvin =

African American physician (1890–1968)

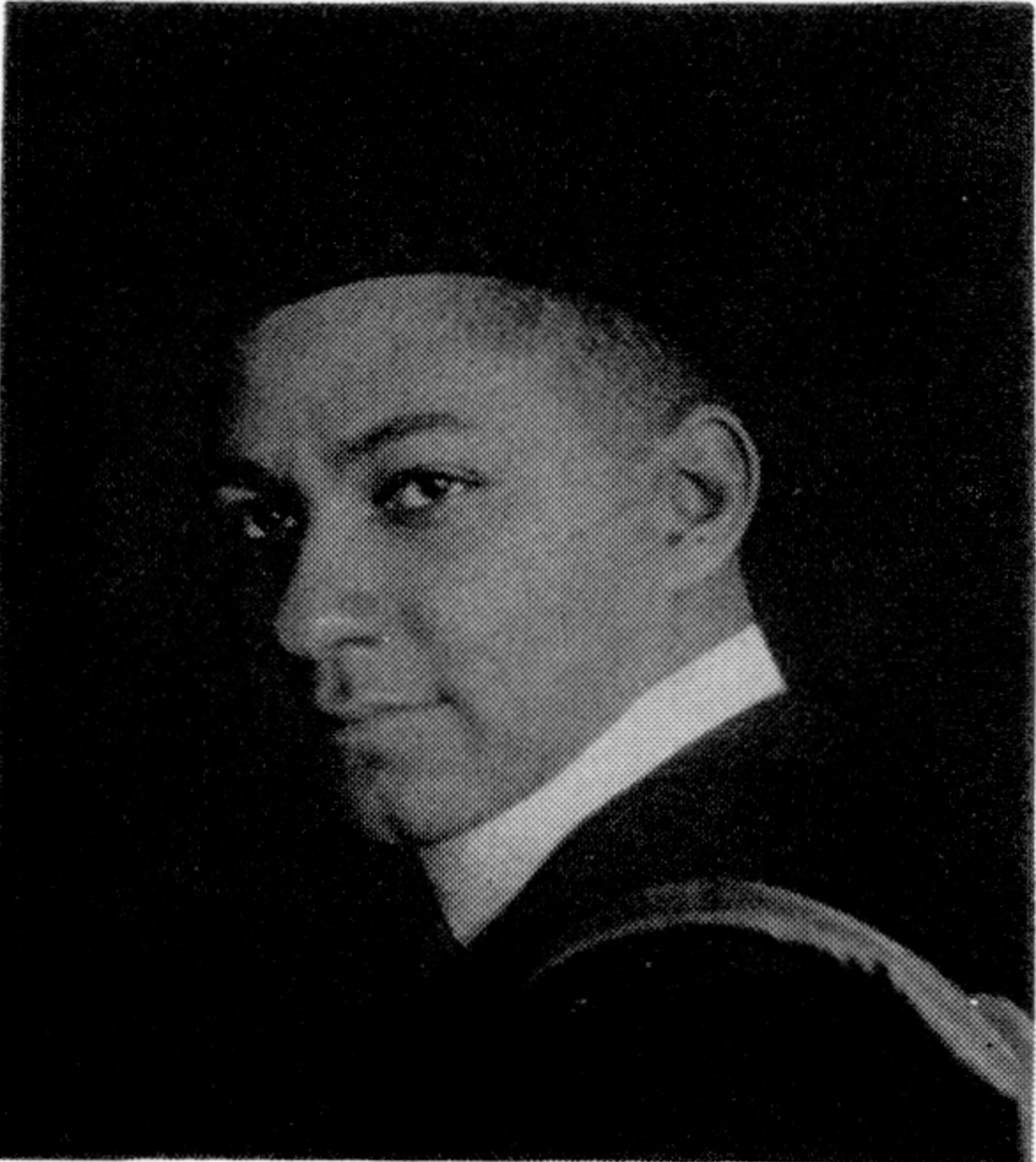
- Medical school graduation, 1915]
- Born: October 27, 1890; Jacksonville, Florida
- Died: July 17, 1968 (aged 77); Cleveland, Ohio
- Education: Atlanta University Academy (1904–1908); Howard University (1908–1911); Howard University College of Medicine (1911–1915)
- Occupations: Physician (urologist); Writer; Professor
- Employer(s): Freedmen's Hospital; Howard University; Lakeside Hospital; Western Reserve University (1930–1937)
- Title: Captain; First Lieutenant

Signature
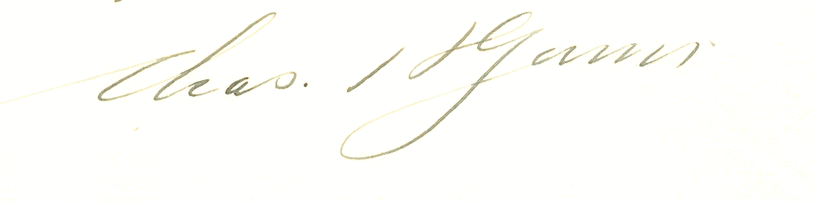

Charles Herbert Garvin, M.D. (October 27, 1890 – July 17, 1968) was a prominent African-American physician, writer, and educator in Cleveland, Ohio. He published 26 papers for the Journal of the National Medical Association on subjects ranging from tuberculosis in African-American populations to the history of the black movement.

Garvin served in World War I as a part of the Medical Reserve Corps in the 92nd Division, a section designated for African-Americans due to segregation laws. He served in France with the rank of captain and as battalion surgeon of the 367th Infantry.

Garvin served in a large number of positions, including chief instructor in Western Reserve University, Board Officer of Howard University, and editor of the journal of the National Medical Association. Eventually, he became the president in the Cleveland branch of the National Negro Medical Association.

Garvin was a close friend of W.E.B. Du Bois; seventeen letters written between them from 1927–1948 have survived.

== Early life and education ==
Charles Garvin was born in Jacksonville, Florida, to Charles Edward Garvin and Theresa De Corcey. His father had been a letter carrier. Not much is known about Garvin's early life except for school records. He attended a wide array of Jacksonville public schools before his parents sent him to Atlanta University Academy from 1904 to 1908.

In 1908, Garvin began his undergraduate studies at Howard University in Washington, D.C. Feeling at home with the vibrant African-American community at school, he decided to remain in the area and attend Howard University College of Medicine in 1911. His completion of medical school was hailed in the local paper in 1915.

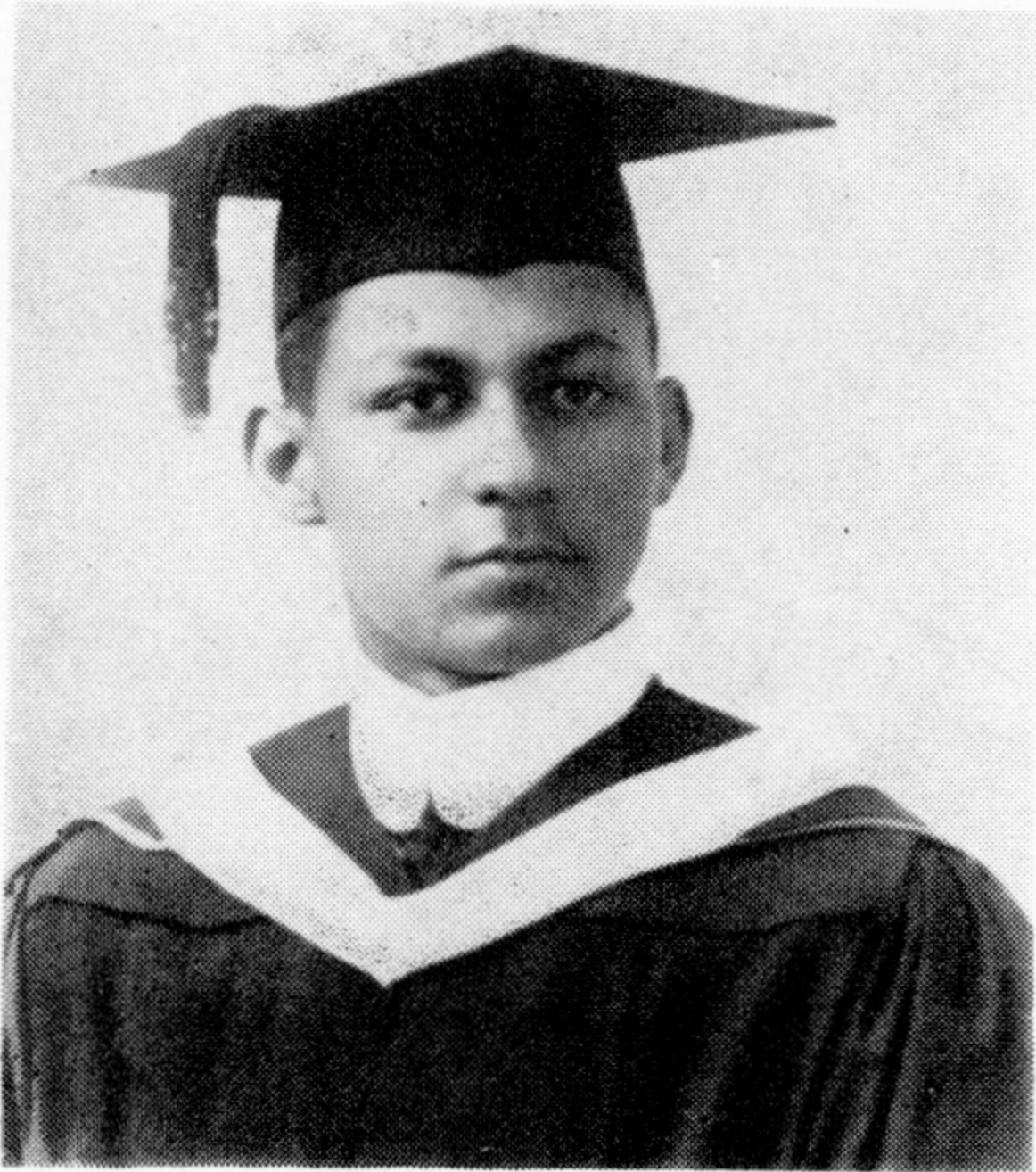
College graduation, 1911

Garvin's years at Howard reveal his civic commitment. He became an active member of the Alpha Phi Alpha fraternity. Alpha Phi Alpha was founded in 1906 and has produced a line of highly successful and innovative graduates, such as Martin Luther King Jr., Jesse Owens, W.E.B. Du Bois, and United Nations Ambassador Andrew Young. From 1911 to 1912, Garvin served as the General Secretary and Executive Director of Alpha Phi Alpha. In 1912, Garvin attended and was elected as the fourth president of Alpha Phi Alpha at the fourth annual convention in Ann Arbor, Michigan. He served two terms as president, between 1912 and 1914.

As president, Garvin wrote the fraternity's "Esprit De Fraternite".Garvin was the first president to serve two terms. While in office, he helped secure a chapter house, appointed a special committee to consult with the president of Howard, and asked members to use every means possible to raise the moral and scholastic tone of the fraternity. Garvin saw that it was vital that the fraternity establish a mindful image and perception for future generations. He did complain of the members' lack of effort in submitting dues, saying, "It is indeed to be regretted that an organization with a membership nearing three hundred cannot get forty dollars worth of printing done four months after a convention." One of Garvin's most notable contributions was the national incorporation of the fraternity under the laws of Congress.

Alpha Phi Alpha convention 1912. with Garvin at the bottom right corner

In his second term, Garvin developed a close collaboration with the NAACP, even publishing an article in the organization's magazine, The Crisis, titled "The Alpha Phi Alpha Fraternity". In the article, he states that the fraternity's founding was done for the purpose "of bringing together the best type of men". He put forth that the "Negro Greek-letter fraternity is no longer an experiment; it is a dominant factor for good and binds Negro college men as no other organization can."

At the 1913 convention at Howard University, the fraternity decided to begin its publication called The Sphinx. Henry L. Dickason succeeded Garvin. However, his time at the fraternity did not cease in medical school. Howard H. Long, who served as president from 1916 to 1917, appointed Garvin as the fraternity's first historian. This dedication to scripting the educational and cultural history of African Americans would continue throughout Garvin's career. He remained active in Alpha until he died in 1968.

After finishing medical school, Garvin began an internship in Freedmen's Hospital.

== Military service ==
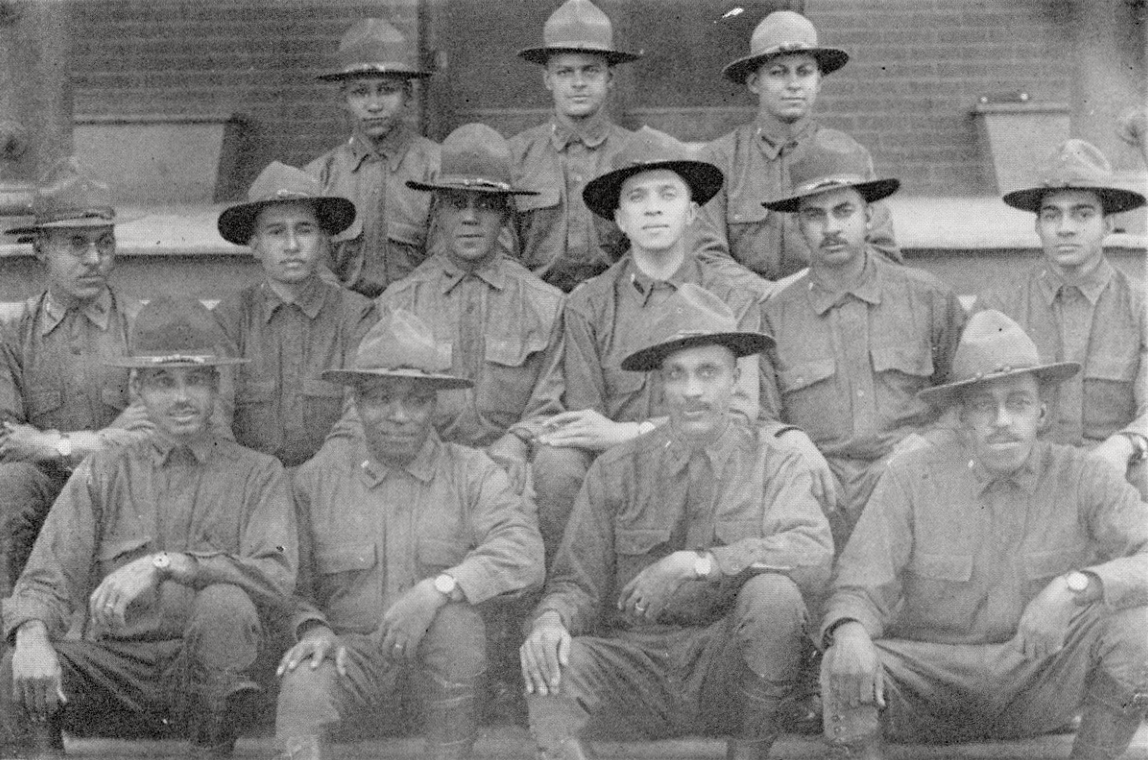
Garvin at Des Moines, Iowa 1917

In 1917, the United States joined World War I, and the nation was abuzz to join the effort. After the declaration of war with Germany, many African Americans were turned away from local recruiting stations. Unprepared for a large-scale conflict, the United States Army had only four black regiments, and many commanders would not allow the mixing of blacks and whites in their units. Also, the black regiments themselves were not trusted to be sent to Europe, as many of the higher-ups lacked confidence in black soldiers as fighters. Fort Des Moines Provisional Army Officer Training School had been opened for training African-American men as there had been a huge influx of African-American volunteers and the students of Howard University had made a petition. However, there was still some discontent at the facility as many soldiers found that they had been unfairly assessed for merely being black.

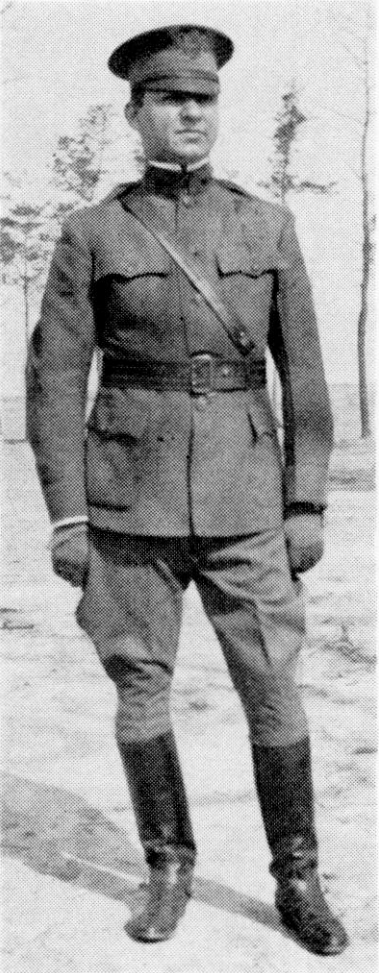
Captain Charles H. Garvin, 1918

When Garvin answered the military's call for physicians, he was immediately given the rank of first lieutenant in the Army Medical Reserve Corps. Like all the African-American recruits, Lt. Garvin was sent to Fort Des Moines for medical training at the Medical Officers Training Camp. After completing his training, he was assigned as battalion surgeon in 1st Battalion, 367th Infantry. In September 1918, Garvin was promoted to commanding officer of the 368th Ambulance Company. Along with his responsibilities as a surgeon, he was also in charge of making sure that the company had all the essential materials — such as the wagon, animals, waste disposal supplies, and medics — and was coordinated to evacuate efficiently.

Before leaving for France, Garvin was ranked Captain. In France, Garvin found a large amount of work on his plate. The 92nd Division had been assigned to the trenches to assist the French troops there who had been facing aggressive assaults from the Germans for months. Garvin spent a lot of his time treating soldiers for illnesses, such as influenza, and gas inhalation. Most African-American soldiers had been assigned to noncombatant engineer units that performed the dangerous and hard jobs of digging trenches and forming roads and fortifications against the Germans. Garvin attended to those heavily injured from the building, as the Germans were becoming more aggressive in late 1918. One tactic the Germans used in the trenches was throwing constant gas shells at the Allied troops, causing the hospitals to be filled with me suffering from lung and breathing problems.

Garvin had a low tolerance for any slacking in his department; there were several instances where he demoted soldiers who did not display adequate performance. He disagreed with the statements issued by General Pershing on how badly the black soldiers were performing in the war. He wanted to have his soldiers prove Pershing wrong and was frequently published in African American newspapers on the matter.

Upon the 92nd Division's entry onto French soil, it was moved to the St. Dre Sector to relieve the 5th Regular U.S. Army Division (composed of white soldiers). Only a few days later, the 5th Regular Division captured the village of Frapelle. Immediately, these fresh African-American recruits were submerged into the harsh terrain of the trenches where the Germans had been sending aggressive assaults, such as frequent releases of gassing shells. In mid-September, Frapelle faced a heavy German bombardment as an airplane duel came into the mix. With aerial and artillery fire coming from many sides, Cpt. Garvin was on full deck. At some point during the attack, the Germans learned that the opposing force that faced them, the 92nd Division, was composed entirely of African Americans. The Germans changed tactics and went into the trenches. The U.S. troops believed that the Germans were sending another surge of gas shells, but when nothing came out of the shells, they went to investigate. Within the shells was propaganda printed in English. It was titled "To the Colored Soldiers of the American Army" and stated:

Hello, boys, what are you doing over here? Fighting the Germans? Why? Have they ever done you any harm? Of course, some white folks and the lying English-American papers told you that the Germans ought to be wiped out for the sake of Humanity and Democracy. What is Democracy? Personal freedom, all citizens enjoying the same rights socially and before the law. Do you enjoy the same rights as the white people do in America, the land of Freedom and Democracy, or are you rather not treated over there as second-class citizens? Can you go into a restaurant where white people dine? Can you get a seat in the theater where white people sit? Can you get a seat or a berth in the railroad car, or can you even ride, in the South, in the same street car with white people? And how about the law? Is lynching and the most horrible crimes connected therewith a lawful proceeding in a democratic country? Now, this is all different in Germany, where they do like colored people, where they treat them as gentlemen and as white people, and quite a number of colored people have fine positions in business in Berlin and other German cities. Why, then, fight the Germans only for the benefit of the Wall Street robbers and to protect the millions they have loaned to the British, French, and Italians? You have been made the tool of the egotistic and rapacious rich in England and in America, and there is nothing in the whole game for you but broken bones, horrible wounds, spoiled health, or death. No satisfaction whatever will you get out of this unjust war. You have never seen Germany. So you are fools if you allow people to make you hate us. Come over and see for yourself. Let those do the fighting who make the profit out of this war. Don't allow them to use you as cannon fodder. To carry a gun in this war is not an honor, but a shame. Throw it away and come over into the German lines. You will find friends who will help you along.

Garvin and his fellow soldiers did not fall for the bait and continued fighting, to their "honor and credit", according to Emmett J. Scott. The fighting continued, with more aerial fire coming from the Germans. However, the French anti-aircraft guns got rid of the assault, and the division moved from St. Die Sector to Ste. Menehold. The 92nd Division became a reserve corps for the Meuse-Argonne campaign in October. In November, Cpt. Garvin and his unit faced another aggressive assault from the Germans in Metz.

At the war's conclusion, Garvin was honorably discharged in 1919. His experience in the war stayed with him for the rest of his life. He published several works on the African-American effort during World War I, including "The Negro in the Special Services of the U. S. Army: Medical Corps, Dental Corps, and Nurses Corps" (1943), in The Journal of Negro Education.

== Career ==
After the war, Garvin returned to Cleveland and started a practice. He co-founded and was the first president of the Former Interns and Residents of Freedmen's Hospital. In 1920, he was offered a teaching position in Western Reserve University, which he accepted, and remained there until 1937. Western Reserve University had a teaching affiliation with Lakeside Hospital, where he was working. He was named assistant surgeon of genito-urinary diseases. With this appointment he became the first African-American to be appointed to a Cleveland hospital. His appointment was significant, for when a survey was conducted in 1920 by the Cleveland Hospital Council on physician employment opportunities and discrimination, it found that only 19 physicians in Cleveland were offered the chance to apply to hospital staff. Only Garvin was given an appointment. However, he still faced discrimination in his workplace, as his responsibilities were limited to outpatient care and his narrow privileges did not allow him to admit patients on his own.

Garvin urged his colleagues to research and study illnesses found disproportionately among African-American populations, such as tuberculosis and pellagra. He disagreed that attachment to the diseases was due to racial and biological inferiority, and wanted research to be conducted to disprove the idea. "We seriously question," Garvin wrote, "if under similar environment—long hours of hard labor; limited often faulty diet, restriction in proper hospital and medical care, and faulty sanitation—any race would have shown such a marked improvement in its tuberculosis rate." He insisted that black physicians carry out this focus because, "herefore in literature, as in medicine, the Negro has been written about, exploited, and experimented upon sometimes not to his physical betterment or to the advancement of science, but the advancement of the Nordic investigator." He further remarked that "in the past, men of other races have for the large part interpreted our diseases, often tinctured with inborn prejudices."

In the early years, Garvin attended the clinics of Dr. George W. Criles. On one occasion, Criles was performing a right rectus abdominal incision when he found a tumor mass. Not having dealt with tumors before, Criles asked his assistants what the mass was. When none answered, Garvin volunteered to answer, saying, "That's a desmoid tumor." The incident was reported in the media and it built Garvin's reputation that he was offered a position in Lakeside Hospital.

Wanting his family to acquire the same benefits as the white community, Garvin moved into a white neighborhood and built his home at 11114 Wade Park Avenue. Much protest was generated at his desire to move in. Crowds came to the house and spread graffiti all over the property; one morning the family awoke to find "KKK" written on the windows. As a result, a guard was posted around the home by the police. On January 31, 1926, at 10 p.m. the house was firebombed, but little damage was done. The incident reached national headlines, and the Garvin family was granted permission to utilize the police force as further protection. The NAACP released a press statement to urge the Cleveland community to offer assistance to the Garvin family in their predicament. Three weeks later another bomb was thrown, but it had not exploded when it crashed through the window. Garvin threw it out the window again, leaving no one harmed. Undeterred by the threat, Garvin renovated the house and moved in with his family a few months later. Garvin's sister made a statement to the press on the incident, saying, "he has made a home for himself and will stay there, all he wants is to be let alone."

The Garvins became huge proponents of African-American independence and were branded as civic leaders of the community. Garvin was one of the many African-American leaders who tried to go over the fractioning occurring among black leaders and emphasized a need for a unified black society. He pushed for racial pride and black solidarity. He was an active member of the NAACP and the National Urban League, and he assisted in many cases of housing discrimination.

Garvin founded the Dunbar Life Insurance Company and Quincy Savings and Loan. He was also a trustee of the Karamu House in Cleveland. In 1925, Garvin helped found the Cleveland Medical Reading Club for African-American doctors to be well informed on current medical advances and programs, as many of the white hospitals still adhered to the Jim Crow laws. His interest in medicine extended beyond his practice to research and writing. He took a special interest in tracing the history of Africans and African-Americans in medicine and completed an unpublished manuscript on the topic which can be found in the Western Reserve Historical Society.

Garvin was part of a large movement to form an all-black hospital in Cleveland. The effort was started in the early 1920s but collapsed due to lack of funding and local government intervention. Between 1926 and 1927, the black physicians in Cleveland came together again to produce a campaign. The movement was much more successful due to a larger degree of organizing among all the physicians. In 1926 the Cleveland Hospital Association funded the black hospital proposition and was renamed the Mercy Hospital Association. Garvin was one of the association's leading officers along with various philanthropists.

There is much debate on whether Garvin would be categorized as an integrationist or a separatist. He rigorously led and advocated in groups that proposed integration, fought for the right to live and own property in a white neighborhood, and was the only black physician in an all-white hospital. However, Garvin, much like his friend Dr. DuBois, was a huge supporter of generating all-black institutions. He was one of the leading proponents of the movement to form an all-black hospital in Cleveland. Although Garvin appreciated the benefits that integration provided, he believed that it was only necessary due to the unequal distribution of resources between the white and black communities. In a speech at Mt. Zion Temple Congregational Church, Garvin shared his uncomfortable experiences dealing with white patients in Lakeside and acknowledged that though integration gave him access to valuable opportunities, there was still the emotional experience of handling the abrupt racism and discrimination with his colleagues.

According to public records from 1949, Garvin was a member of the Cleveland Public Library Board and worked vigorously to provide more resources and elements for potential researchers and writers.

In 1963, Garvin was awarded the Warfield Award from Howard University for his effort and contributions to the school executive board.

Garvin was a frequent writer in the Journal of the National Medical Association, publishing a total of 26 papers and leaving a large number unpublished when he died. He also served as editor of the journal for the majority of his career. He contributed to "Misrepresenting the Tuskegee Syphilis Study ", which remarked on misconceptions done when physicians wrote about the racial connections to contracting syphilis. In 1930 he is quoted as saying that to capitalize "Negro" in American Medical Association (AMA) publications would be an act "in recognition of racial self-respect for those who have been in the 'lower case' so long".

== Personal life ==
In 1921, Garvin married Rosalind West, a native of Charlottesville, Virginia. The couple had met at Howard University, where Rosalind majored in education. They had two sons together: Charles West Garvin (b. June 29, 1921) and Henry Clark Garvin (b. June 26, 1928). His younger son followed in his father's footsteps and became a physician himself, graduating from Amherst College and Western Reserve Medical School. In his later years, Garvin would share a practice with his son.

== Death ==
In 1968, Garvin died. He was survived by his son, Harry, and wife. The Journal of the National Medical Association dedicated a section of its 1969 publication to the doctor's life and accomplishments. In the years following his death, Garvin was frequently mentioned in the historical section of the African-American magazine Jet.

It is unknown what became of his works and papers immediately following his death, but currently, a collection of Garvin's manuscripts, letters, and works are held in the Western Reserve Historical Society.

Garvin's son succeeded him in the Cleveland Reading Club.

== Publications ==
- "Post-War Planning for Negro Hospitals." Editorial. Journal of the National Medical Association, vol. 37 (1945): 28-29.
- "Circumcision: is it justified in infancy?" Journal of the National Medical Association vol. 158, no. 4 (1966):233–238. with C. H. Garvin and L. Persky.
- "Is the Gonococcus Resistant to Penicillin?: A Review of the Treatment of 130 Cases of Acute Gonococcal Urethritis in the Male." Journal of the National Medical Association, vol. 59, no. 2 (1967): 100–104.
- "The Negro in the Special Services of the U. S. Army: Medical Corps, Dental Corps and Nurses Corps." Journal of Negro Education, vol. 12, no. 3 (Summer, 1943), pp. 335–344.
- "The Negro Doctor's Task." BCR, vol. 16 (November 1932): 269–270.
- "Negro Health." Opportunity (November 1924): 341.
- "The Capital 'N' in Negro". Journal of the National Medical Association, vol.22 (1930): 10.
- "Index Medicus of Negro Authors 1924–1934." Journal of the National Medical Association, vol. 27 (1935):146–152.
- "The Negro Physicians and Hospitals in Cleveland." Journal of the National Medical Association, vol. 22 (1930): 125.
