= George Armstrong Kelly =

American political theorist

- Born: 1932; Pittsburgh
- Died: December 23, 1987 (aged 54–55); Manhattan

Academic background
- Education: Stanford University (M.A.); Harvard University (PhD)
- Thesis: Toward Hegel: Idealist Political Philosophy and the Historical Consciousness, 1750-1830 (1967)

Academic work
- Era: Contemporary philosophy
- Sub-discipline: Political Philosophy
- Region: Western philosophy
- School or tradition: German Idealism

George Armstrong Kelly (1932 Pittsburgh – December 23, 1987 Manhattan) was a political theorist, university professor and a notable scholar on the works of Hegel.

== Life and works ==
Kelly was born in Pittsburgh, and graduated from St. Paul's School in 1949. He received his bachelor's degree from Harvard College in 1953, a master's degree from Stanford University and a doctorate in political science from Harvard University.

== Publications ==
=== Books ===
- Hegel's Retreat from Eleusis: Studies in Political Thought. Princeton U.P. 1978. ISBN 978-0-691-07589-1.
- Idealism, Politics and History: Sources of Hegelian Thought. Internet Archive. Cambridge U.P. 1969. ISBN 978-0-521-07510-7.
- Lost Soldiers: The French Army and Empire in Crisis, 1947-1962. MIT Press. 1965. ISBN 978-0-262-11014-3.

=== Articles ===
- "Notes on Hegel's "Lordship and Bondage"". The Review of Metaphysics. 19 (4): 780–802. 1966. ISSN 0034-6632.
