= Henry Ponder =

American academic administrator

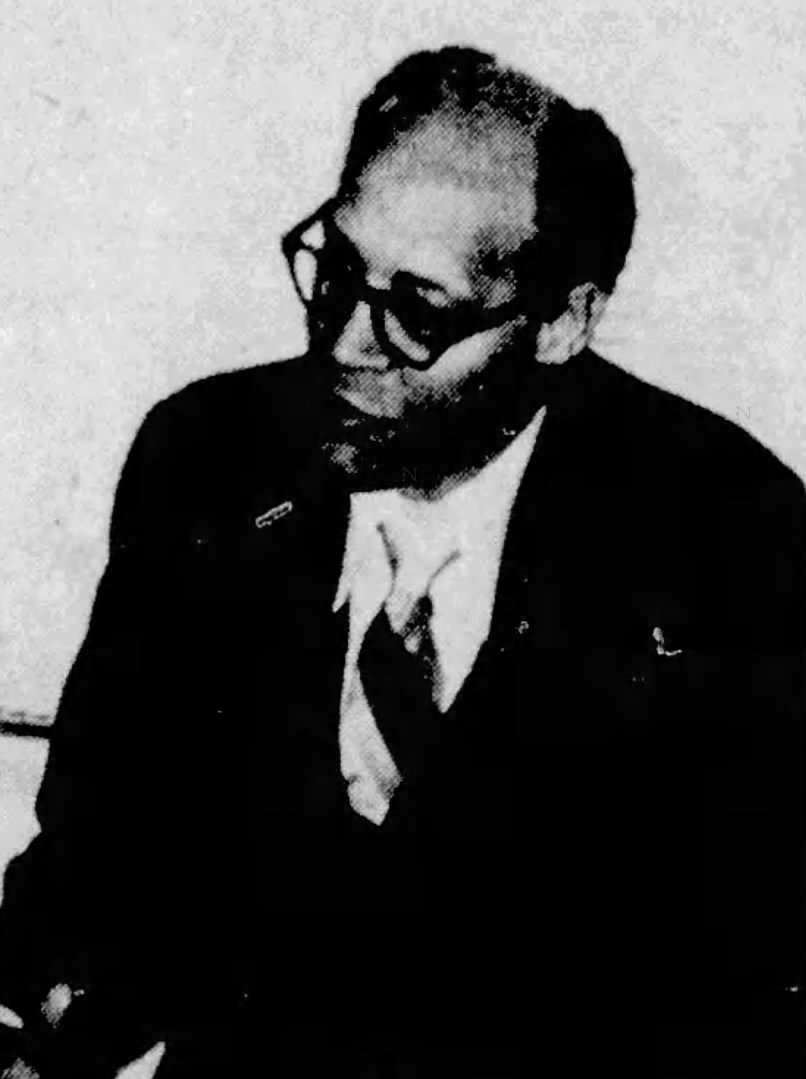
- Ponder in 1977
- Born: March 28, 1928 (age 98); Wewoka, Oklahoma, US
- Education: Langston University, BA; Oklahoma State University, MA; Ohio State University, PhD
- Occupation: University President
- Employer(s): Benedict College; Fisk University; Talladega College; Langston University; National Association for Equal Opportunity in Higher Education (NAFEO)
- Organization: Alpha Phi Alpha
- Predecessor: Benjamin F. Payton
- Successor: Marshall C. Grigsby

Henry Ponder, Ph.D. (born 1928) is an American educator and former university president. He was president of Benedict College, Fisk University, Talladega College, and Langston University. Over a career spanning more than six decades, Dr. Ponder's efforts increased educational opportunity for generations of young men and women, particularly students of color. Further, he holds a unique place in the history of higher education as the only person to serve as president of four Historically Black Colleges and Universities (HBCUs), chair of member institutions of the United Negro College Fund, and CEO and president of the National Association of Equal Opportunity in Higher Education (NAFEO), which is the lobby organization for all HBCUs, public and private.

== Early life ==
Dr. Ponder was born in 1928 in Wewoka, Oklahoma – the eleventh of fourteen children born to farmers Lillie Mae and Frank Ponder. He excelled in academics early and was inspired as a youngster to become a college president after hearing a speech by legendary educator and activist Mary McCloud Bethune. He earned a B.S. degree in agriculture from Langston University, the M.S. degree in agricultural economics from Oklahoma State University, and the Ph.D. in agricultural economics from The Ohio State University.

== Career ==
Dr. Ponder began his career in higher education at Virginia State College (now University), where he served as Assistant Professor and Chair of the Department of Agri-Business. From there, he served as Chair of the Department of Business and Economics at Fort Valley State College (now University) in Georgia then as Vice President for Academic Affairs at Alabama A&M University.

In 1973, Dr. Ponder fulfilled his childhood aspiration. He was inaugurated president of Benedict College, where he cultivated a fiscal-turnaround expertise – for which he would become widely known – by growing the institution’s endowment from $250,000 to $13 million. After an eleven-year tenure at Benedict, Dr. Ponder took the helm of embattled Fisk University in Nashville, Tennessee. From 1984 until 1996, he guided the university back from the brink of financial ruin, taking a $4 million debt to a $10 million endowment and securing earmarked capital for the restoration of the university’s historic physical plant. During this time, he was honored in 1986 as one of the “One Hundred Most Effective College Presidents in the United States.”

In 1996, Dr. Ponder left Fisk for a position that would allow him to fight for the survival and growth of all HBCUs. From 1996 to 2001, he served as NAFEO’s CEO and president in Washington, D.C. Retiring from NAFEO in 2001 with a plan to return to South Carolina, Dr. Ponder was soon called to the helm of struggling Talladega College in Talladega, Alabama, where he led the successful revitalization and enhancement of the curriculum in order to retain the institution’s accreditation status. In 2003, Dr. Ponder retired again and, politely declining several academic inquiries, enjoyed a new dedication – serving as a deacon at the St. James Baptist Church on Hilton Head Island. In 2010, however, he found it impossible to refuse an appeal from his alma mater. Dr. Ponder returned to Langston University in 2010 as Lillian Hemmit Endowed Chair in Institutional Advancement but was called upon by the Board of Regents to take the helm of the institution in 2011 – meeting the interim mandate to stabilize the institution and increase alumni giving substantially. Retiring for a third time in 2013, he returned to South Carolina but continues to have an impact as a periodic consultant and advisor on fundraising, student enrollment, and accreditation to several HBCU presidents.

Dr. Ponder served on the boards of J.P. Stevens and Company, SCANA Corporation, SunTrust Bank, C&S Bank, and the Federal Reserve Bank of Richmond – Charlotte Branch, which he chaired for two years. He has received numerous honorary degrees and has been awarded the “Distinguished Alumni Award” from Langston University, Oklahoma State University, and The Ohio State University, where he was also honored as one of the institution’s “One Hundred Most Distinguished Graduates.” He was inducted into the Oklahoma State University Alumni Hall of Fame in 1998 and given the Oklahoma State University Diversity Hall of Fame Award in 2015. In 2017, he was inducted into the Oklahoma African-American Educator’s Hall of Fame.

== Personal life ==
Dr. Ponder is a member of Alpha Phi Alpha and was elected 28th General President in 1988. He served also as vice chairman of the fraternity's World Policy Council, a think tank the purpose of which is to expand Alpha Phi Alpha's involvement in international political and social policy. Further, Dr. Ponder achieved the rank of 32nd degree Prince Hall Mason and, since 1980, has been an active Archon of Sigma Pi Phi fraternity (the Boulé).

Dr. Ponder is a veteran of the U.S. Armed Forces, serving in the U.S. Army's Field Artillery branch from 1953, at the end of the Korean War, until 1955. He is also a proponent of U.S. National Parks and was honored in 2001 with the National Park Service's highest civilian award The Honorary National Park Ranger.

Dr. Ponder married his college sweetheart Eunice Wilson Ponder, Ed.D., also an educator, in 1952.

Preceded by Charles Teamer	General President of Alpha Phi Alpha; 1989-1992	Succeeded by Milton C. Davis
