= Hugh Bernard Price =

American activist

Hugh Price
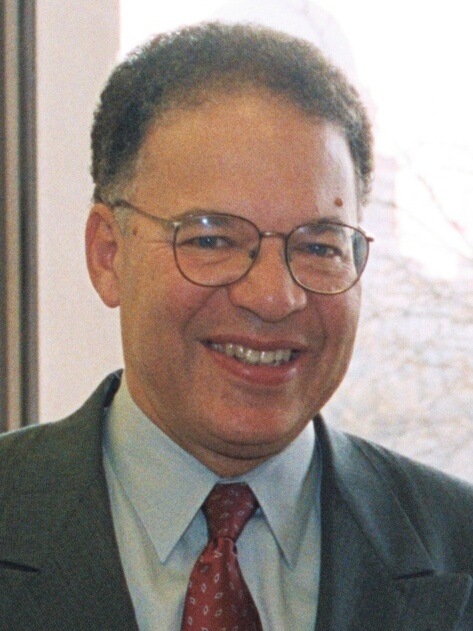
- Price in 2001
- Born: Hugh Bernard Price; November 22, 1941 (age 83); Washington, D.C., U.S.
- Education: Amherst College (BA); Yale University (LLB)

Hugh Bernard Price (born 1941) is an American activist. He served as the President of the National Urban League from 1994 to 2003.

Price is a member of Alpha Phi Alpha fraternity.

Price is a member of the advisory board of the Future of American Democracy Foundation, a nonprofit, nonpartisan foundation in partnership with Yale University Press and the Yale Center for International and Area Studies.

Price was elected to the American Philosophical Society in 1995 and the American Academy of Arts and Sciences in 2000. He received the Westchester County Trailblazers Award in 2014.

Price is currently a senior fellow in Economic Studies at the Brookings Institution.
