= George Biddle Kelley =

African American fraternity founder

- Born: July 28, 1884; Troy, New York, US
- Died: May 5, 1962 (aged 77); Troy, New York, US
- Burial place: Oakwood Cemetery (Troy, New York)
- Education: Rensselaer Polytechnic Institute; Cornell University
- Occupations: Civil engineer and tax auditor
- Employer: State of New York
- Known for: Founder of Alpha Phi Alpha

George Biddle Kelley (1884 –1962) was an African American civil engineer and fraternity founder. He was New York's first officially registered African American engineer. While attending Cornell University, Kelley was a founding member and the first president of the Alpha Phi Alpha, the first African American college fraternity in the United States.

== Early life ==
George Biddle Kelley was born in Troy, New York, on July 28, 1884, to Richard Kelley and Matilda Decker Kelley. Kelley's father was a carpenter and formerly enslaved man, who served in the 20th United States Colored Infantry Regiment during the Civil War. His mother was a homemaker and the daughter of Rev. William H. Decker who was associated with the Underground Railroad. Kelley was one of nine children. As a young boy, he attended Troy Military Academy and was the only African American graduate.

In September 1898, Kelley continued his education at Rensselaer Polytechnic Institute. At Rensselaer, Kelley was known for his whistle. He also was an orator, who often recited "Curfew Shall Not Ring to Night". In 1902, he founded a chapter of the Association for the Advancement of Negros at Liberty Presbyterian Church in Troy.

In 1905, Kelley enrolled in the College of Civil Engineering at Cornell University. While there, he joined the Social Studies Club for African American students, serving as its treasurer. On December 4, 1906, Kelley along with six other students formed Alpha Phi Alpha fraternity, the first black Greek collegiate fraternity in the United States. He was the fraternity's first president.

Kelley earned a bachelor's degree in civil engineering from Cornell University in 1908. He wrote, A Design for a Sewer System for a Portion of the Town of Saugerties, for his senior thesis.

== Career ==
After college, Kelley returned to Troy, New York. He registered with the New York State Engineering Board, making history as the state's first officially certified African American engineer. He spent the first half of his career with the New York Engineering Department, working on various projects, including the New York State Barge Canal.

Kelley then worked as an auditor for the New York State Department of Taxation and Finance. After 32 years of service, Kelley retired. In the latter part of his career, he shifted to taxation, first working for the state of New York and then as a tax consultant in the private sector.

== Personal life ==
Kelley was fifty years old when he married Harriet Gross in May 1934.

Kelley was a 32nd-degree Mason in Prince Hall Freemasonry. While living in Troy, New York, he was ordained as an elder at the Liberty Presbyterian Church. He served as a director of Troy's Central YMCA and was the vice chairman of the Troy Council for the New York State Anti-Discrimination Commission. He also had a long-standing membership in Troy's NAACP.

Kelley died on May 5, 1962, at the age of 77 at his childhood home in Troy. He was buried on May 10, 1962, in the Oakwood Cemetery in Troy. He was subsequently moved to New Mt. Ida Cemetery, near his parents' gravesite.
