= Noted Negro Women =

1893 biographic dictionary

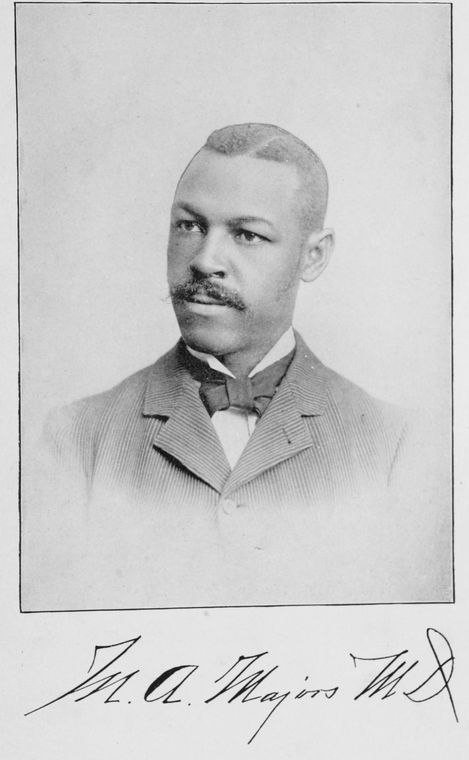
Author Monroe Alpheus Majors in 1893

Noted Negro Women: Their Triumphs and Activities is a compilation of biographies of African-American women by Monroe Alpheus Majors published in 1893 in Chicago. Majors sketched the lives of nearly 300 women, including Edmonia Lewis, Amanda Smith, Ida B. Wells, and Sojourner Truth. Majors began to compile the book in Waco, Texas, in 1890. He hoped to show the worth of black women for themselves and as an expression of the value of all African Americans. A significant omission from the book was Harriet Tubman. The book sought to shape contemporary attitudes and historian Milton C. Sernett hypothesizes that including Tubman would invoke memories of the pain of slavery.

Majors' work was perhaps the first of its kind, although in the same year another anthology of biographies of African-American women was published, Women of Distinction. Women of Distinction was edited by Lawson A. Scruggs and included contributions by 15 writers. These works coupled with the increased prominence of African-American woman, and particularly the 1892 publication of Southern Horrors: Lynch Law in All Its Phases by Ida B. Wells, led to 1893 being proclaimed "Year of the Black Women". Noted Negro Women and Women of Distinction were volumes about notable African-American women that were a part of a group of biographical anthologies about African Americans published in the late 1800s and early 1900s. Majors' work was meant to inspire women and serve as a manual of feminine behavior. These books by Majors and Scruggs reflected fresh optimism about the future of African Americans. Frederick Douglass was skeptical about the project, stating in regards to an inquiry by Majors for his book that he did not know of any women who could be called famous.

== List of individuals with biographies in anthology ==
- Lucinda Bragg Adams
- Octavia V. Rogers Albert
- Caroline Still Anderson
- Naomi Anderson
- Flora Batson
- Maria Becraft
- Rosa Dixon Bowser
- Martha Bailey Briggs
- Mary E. Britton
- Hallie Quinn Brown
- Pauline Powell Burns
- Lulu Vere Childers
- Mary Cole
- Lucretia Newman Coleman
- Anna J. Cooper
- Fanny Jackson Coppin
- Julia Ringwood Coston
- Olivia A. Davidson
- Henrietta Vinton Davis
- Georgia Mabel DeBaptiste
- Louise De Mortie
- Dr. H. T. Dillon
- Sarah Jane Woodson Early
- Ida Gibbs
- Ida Gray
- Elizabeth Greenfield
- Charlotte Forten Grimké
- Frances Harper
- Myrtle Hart
- Julia Hayden
- Della Irving Hayden
- Josephine D. Heard
- Joan Imogen Howard
- Hyers Sisters
- Amelia E. Johnson
- Anna H. Jones
- Matilda Sissieretta Joyner Jones
- Sarah Gibson Jones
- Sophia B. Jones
- Elizabeth Keckley
- Lucy Craft Laney
- Nellie A. Ramsey Leslie
- Edmonia Lewis
- Eva Lewis
- Lillian A. Lewis
- Alice E. McEwen
- Harriet Gibbs Marshall
- Nellie Brown Mitchell
- Louise De Mortie
- Gertrude Bustill Mossell
- Mary Ella Mossell
- Lucy Ella Moten
- Ednorah Nahar
- Effie Lee Newsome
- Nzinga of Ndongo and Matamba
- Zelia Ball Page
- Mary Virginia Cook Parrish
- Georgia E. L. Patton Washington
- Mary S. Peake
- Meta E. Pelham
- Sarah Dudley Pettey
- Ida Platt
- Frances E. L. Preston
- Ranavalona III
- Charlotte E. Ray
- Emma Ann Reynolds
- Martha Ann Erskine Ricks
- Celia Dial Saxon
- Mary Ann Shadd
- Susie Lankford Shorter
- Amanda Smith
- Christine Shoecraft Smith
- Lucy Wilmot Smith
- Lavinia B. Sneed
- Susan McKinney Steward
- Elizabeth Stumm
- Mary Church Terrell
- Lillian Thomas Fox
- Clarissa M. Thompson
- Amelia Tilghman
- Katherine D. Chapman Tillman
- Sojourner Truth
- Josephine Turpin Washington
- Frankie E. Harris Wassom
- Ida B. Wells
- Julia Williams
- Marie Selika Williams
- Phillis Wheatley
- Ione Wood Gibbs
- Josephine Silone Yates
- Jessie Young
