= The Afro-American Press and Its Editors =

1891 book by Irvine Garland Penn

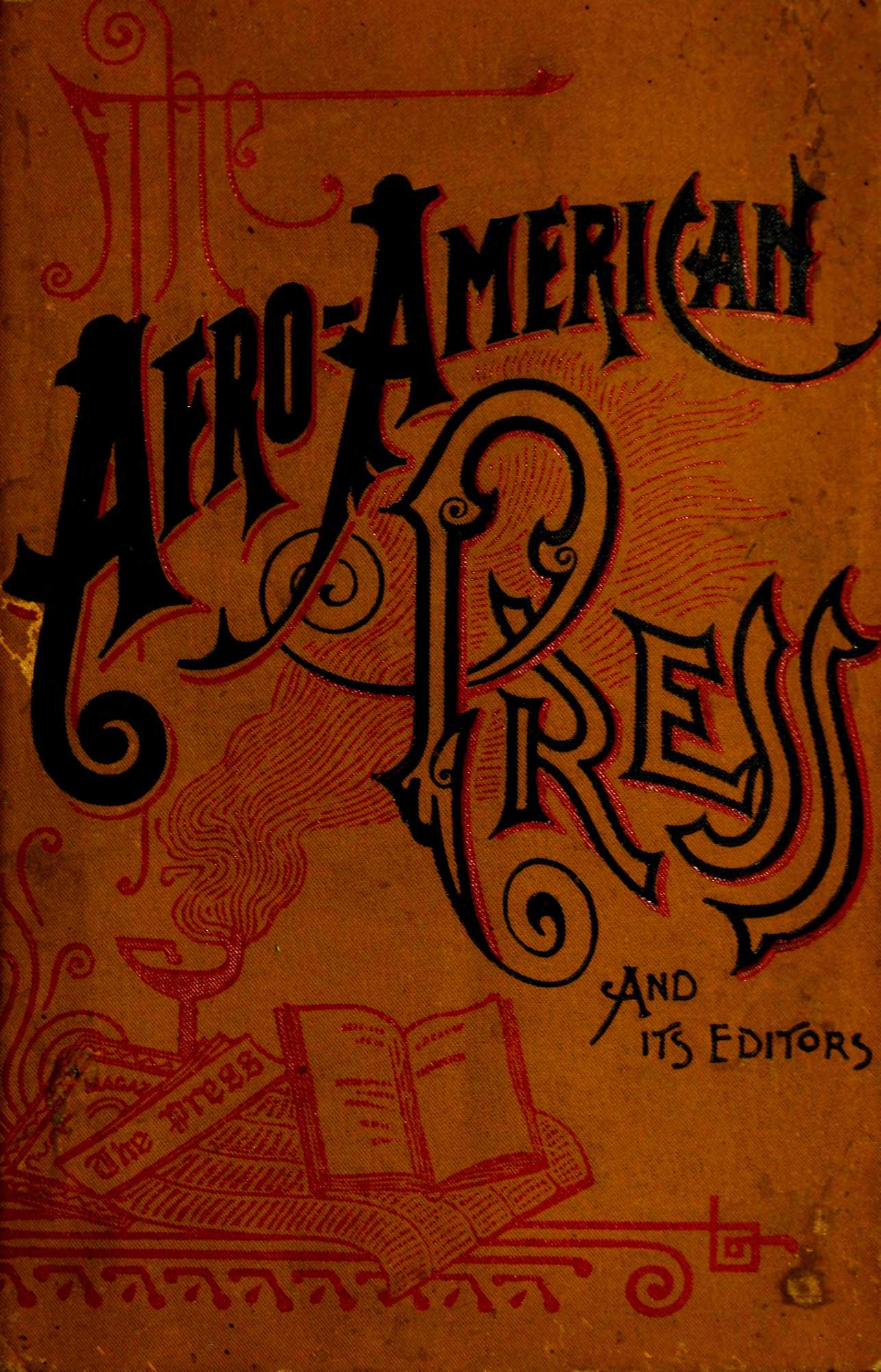
- Author: Irvine Garland Penn
- Publisher: Willey & Company
- Publication date: 1891
- ISBN: 9780598582683

Afro-American Press and Its Editors is a book published in 1891 written by Irvine Garland Penn. Penn covers African-American newspapers and magazines published between 1827 and 1891. The book covers many aspects of journalism, and devotes a chapter to black female journalists.

== About ==
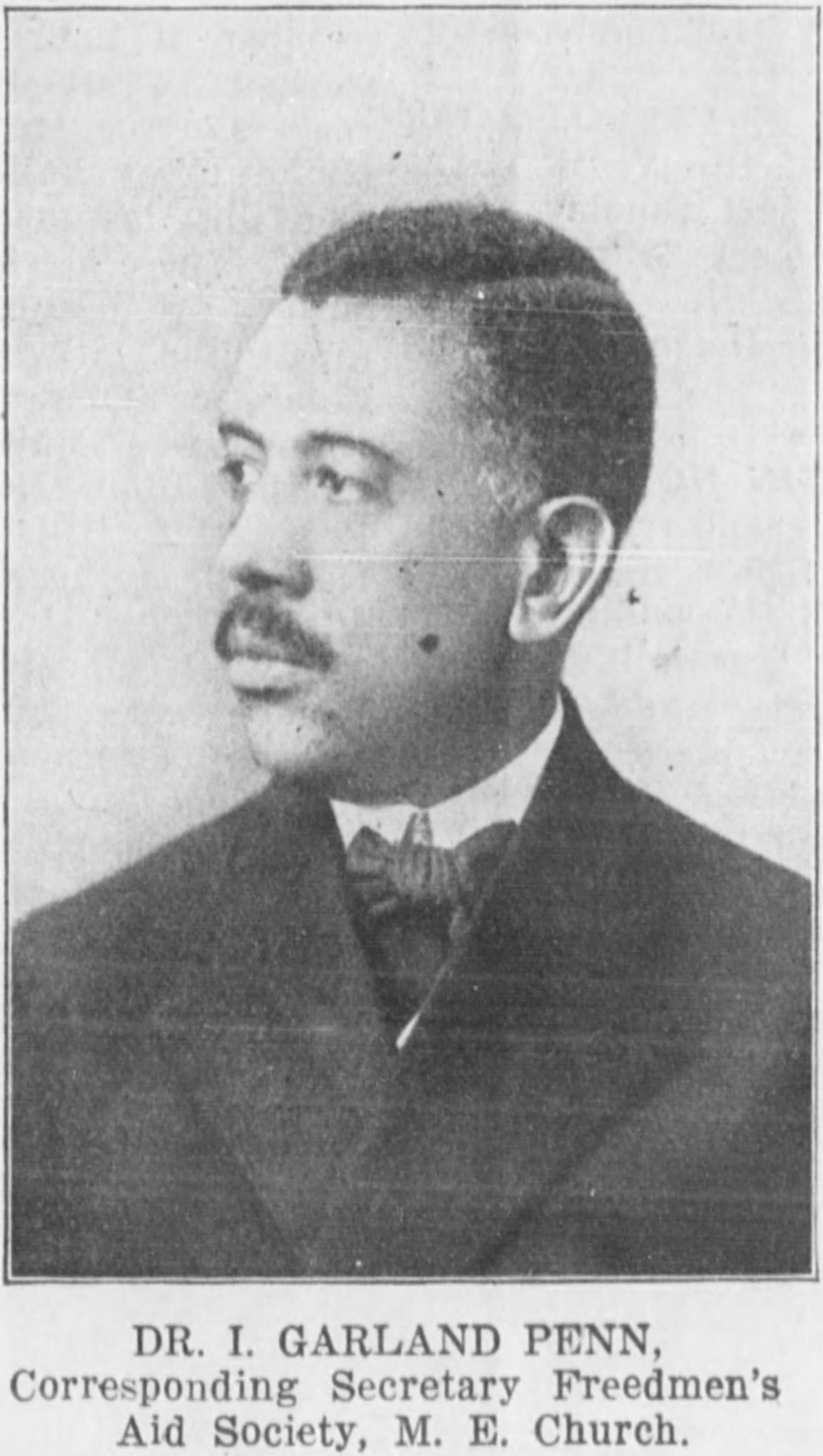
Author, Irvine Garland Penn

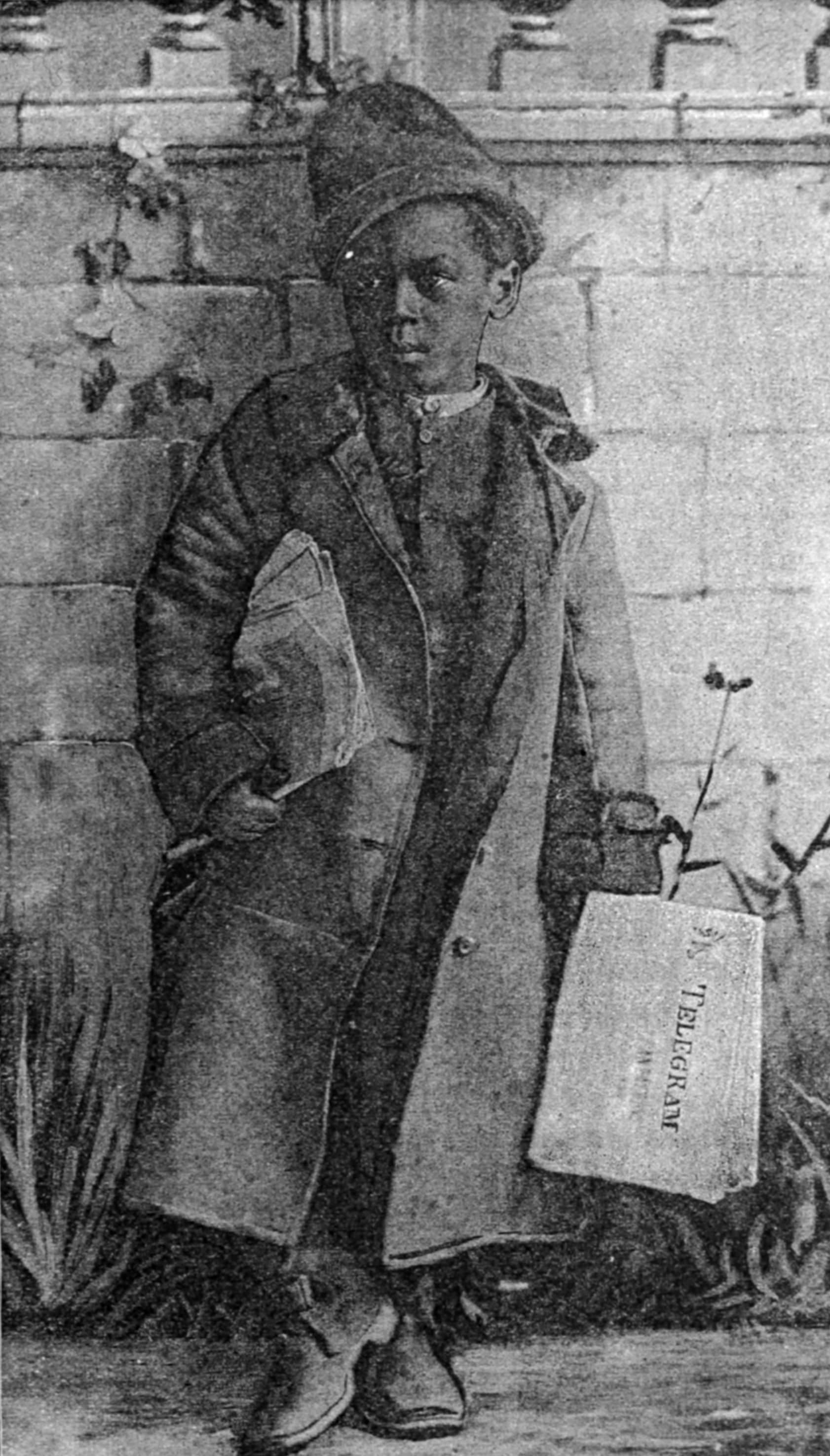
Image of newsboy from book

Penn believed that the black press played a crucial role in presenting the case to the broader American population that black people were fit for the full benefits of citizenship.

The book is frequently referenced as an important early work on African-American journalism. John Ernest called Penn's book comprehensive and detailed and the foundation of many later studies. Penn wrote in part to encourage blacks to support black papers. Charles A. Simmons writes that Penn's book along with Armistead S. Prides, A Register and History of Negro Newspapers in the United States: 1827–1950 and Warren Henry Brown's Check List of Negro Newspapers in the United States (1827-1946) are essential starting points for understanding the early history of African American newspapers.

== List of individuals profiled in book ==
- John Quincy Adams
- A. E. P. Albert
- G. W. Anderson
- W. H. Anderson (journalist)
- William H. Anderson (journalist)
- J. T. Bailey
- Samuel J. Bampfield
- Robert C. O. Benjamin
- Daniel S. Bentley
- Joseph Albert Booker
- J. Dallas Bowser
- Mary E. Britton
- William F. Brooks
- Calvin S. Brown
- John Edward Bruce
- William Buford (journalist)
- Abel Payne Caldwell
- David C. Carter
- William Calvin Chase
- Levi E. Christy
- Matthew Wesley Clair
- George W. Clinton (journalist)
- T. W. Coffee
- Lucretia Newman Coleman
- Edward E. Cooper
- John Wesley Cromwell
- John C. Dancy
- D. W. Davis (journalist)
- Georgia Mabel De Baptiste
- Richard DeBaptiste
- Martin R. Delany
- William H. Dewey
- Henry Fitzbutler
- Timothy Thomas Fortune
- William Henderson Franklin
- George W. Gayles
- Charles Benjamin William Gordon Sr.
- F. M. Hamilton
- Frances E. W. Harper
- B. T. Harvey
- Charles Hendley
- Thomas T. Henry
- S. N. Hill
- Augustus M. Hodges
- J. Alexander Holmes
- J. E. Jones (journalist)
- R. A. Jones (journalist)
- Amelia E. Johnson
- Charles A. Johnson (journalist)
- W. B. Johnson (journalist)
- William E. King
- Lillian A. Lewis
- Matthew M. Lewey
- Edward Hart Lipscombe
- R. D. Littlejohn
- William S. Lowry
- Victoria Earle Matthews
- Alice E. McEwen
- A. N. McEwen
- John Mitchell Jr.
- W. H. Mixon
- J. T. Morris
- Gertrude Bustill Mossell
- William Murrell (journalist)
- Richard Nelson (journalist)
- Mary Virginia Cook Parrish
- E. W. S Peck
- Benjamin B. Pelham
- Meta E. Pelham
- Robert Pelham Jr.
- Christopher J. Perry
- R. S. Ransom
- I. Randall Reid
- Magnus Lewis Robinson
- S. D. Russell
- John Brown Russwurm
- D. J. Saunders
- John T. Shuften
- William F. Simpson
- Harry C. Smith
- Lucy Wilmot Smith
- W. C. Smith (journalist)
- Lavinia B. Sneed
- James J. Spellman
- John Gordon Street
- Walter H. Stowers
- Elizabeth Stumm
- Chasteen C. Stumm
- W. Allison Sweeney
- Charles H. J. Taylor
- Marshall W. Taylor
- Robert T. Teamoh
- Amelia L. Tilghman
- Katherine D. Tillman
- William B. Townsend
- Henry McNeal Turner
- Sheadrick Bond Turner
- Samuel Ringgold Ward
- Josephine T. Washington
- John L. Waller
- Ida B. Wells
- William J. White
- Daniel Barclay Williams
- E. A. Williams
- D. A. Williamson
- John H. Williamson
- Joseph T. Wilson
- Ione E. Wood

== List of newspapers and magazines profiled in book ==
- Detroit Plaindealer (1883–1894)
- Freedom's Journal (1827–1829)
- Southwestern Christian Advocate (1877–1929)
- The Appeal (1885–1923)
- The Baptist Vanguard (c. 1882–present)
- The Colored American (1837–1842)
- The North Star (1847–1865)
- The Rights of All (1829–1830)
