= Lavinia B. Sneed =

Journalist and educator (1867–1932)

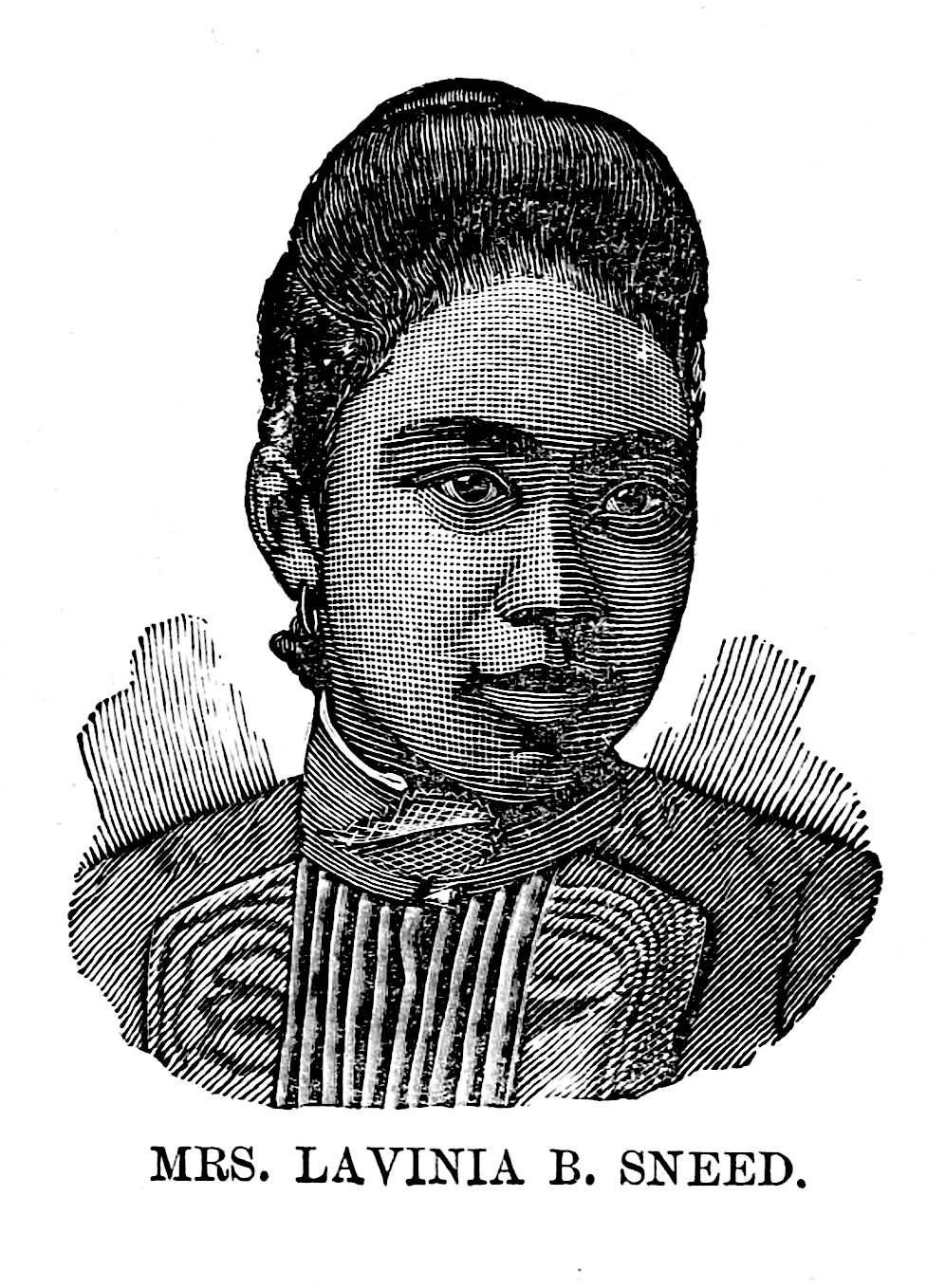
- Born: Lavinia B. Elliot; May 15, 1867; New Orleans, Louisiana
- Died: June 23, 1932 (aged 65); Louisville, Kentucky, U.S.
- Burial place: Louisville Cemetery, Louisville, Kentucky, U.S.
- Education: State Colored Jewish University
- Occupations: Journalist, educator
- Spouse: Charles F. Sneed (m. 1888)

Lavinia B. Sneed (née Lavinia Elliot; 1867–1932) was an American journalist, known for her prolific work and accessible style of writing.

== Biography ==
Lavinia Elliot was born on May 15, 1867, in New Orleans, Louisiana, to parents Letta A. Jones and Joseph Elliot. She moved to Louisville, Kentucky, with her family in early childhood.

She attended the State Colored Baptist University, and graduated in 1887. The State Colored Baptist University was renamed State University, then renamed Simmons Bible College and is now known as Simmons College of Kentucky. In 1888, she married Charles Franklin Sneed, a professor at State University.

Her career in education included teaching at State University, serving on the Ladies Board of Care at Eckstein Norton University, and serving as principal of the Georgia Moore Colored School and Phillis Wheatley Colored School.

A highlight of her journalism career were her contributions to the magazine Our Women and Children. Her follow contributors included Mary Virginia Cook Parrish, Lucy Wilmot Smith and Iona E. Wood.

She is included in several biographical collections of notable African American women, including "Women of Distinction" (1893) edited by Lawson A. Scruggs, "Noted Negro Women: Their Triumphs and Activities", (1893) by Monroe Alpheus Majors and "The Kentucky African American Encyclopedia" (2015; ISBN 0813160650).

She died on June 23, 1932, in Louisville, Kentucky.
