= Abel Payne Caldwell =

American journalist, editor (1865–1917)

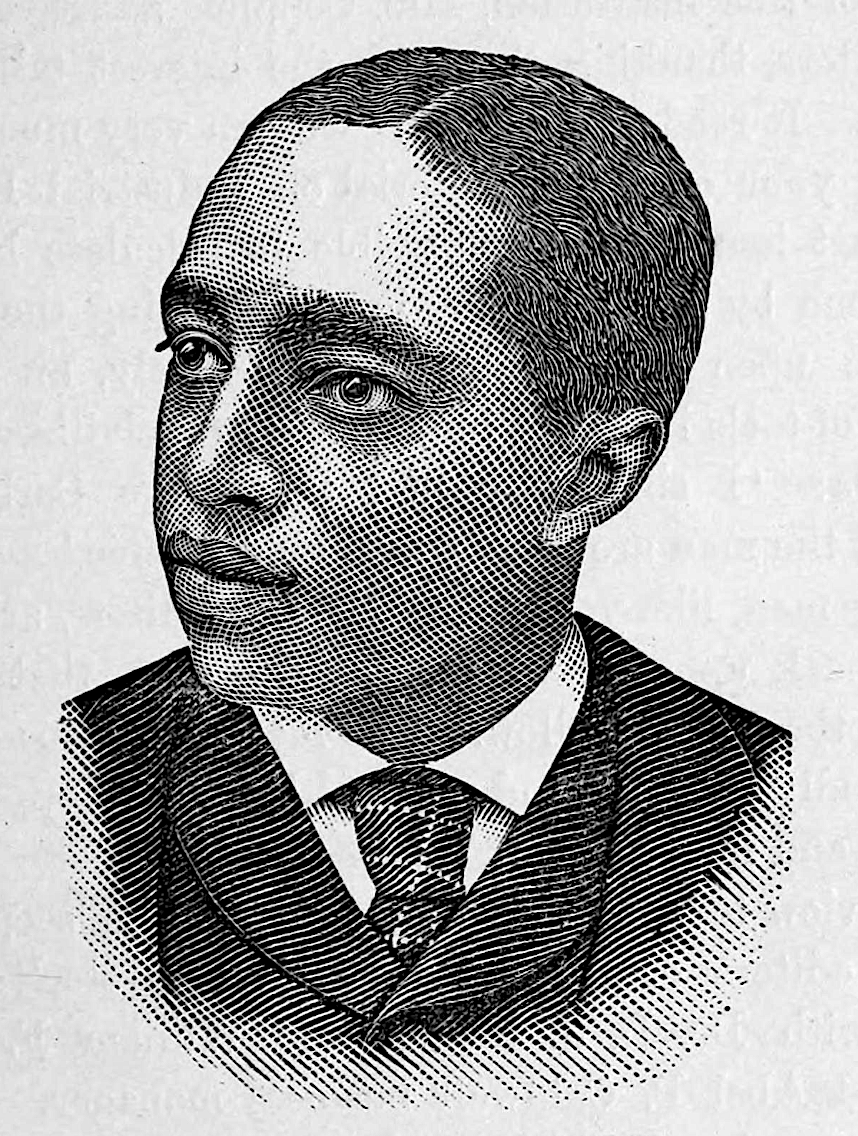
- Born: January 1, 1865; Chapel Hill, North Carolina, United States
- Died: May 11, 1917 (aged 52); Philadelphia, Pennsylvania, United States
- Burial place: Merion Memorial Park, Bala Cynwyd, Pennsylvania, United States
- Occupations: Journalist, editor, business manager
- Spouse: Patti B. Whitby (m. 1907–)

Abel Payne Caldwell (1865–1917) was an American journalist, editor, and newspaper business manager. He lived in Philadelphia.

== Early life and family ==
Abel Payne Caldwell was born on January 1, 1865, in Chapel Hill, North Carolina, to enslaved parents Mary A. and John Caldwell. When the American Civil War was over months later in 1865, his parents found freedom. In 1869, when he was four years old, the Caldwell family moved to Philadelphia, and he was able to attend school. He was a member of the Wesley AME Zion Church.

In June 1907, Caldwell married Patti B. Whitby of Philadelphia.

== Career ==
In 1882 at age seventeen, Caldwell became the business manager at The Monthly Echo newspaper. By 1884, Caldwell and his brother purchased The Monthly Echo, and continued publication for several more years. He was the editor at the American Herald, a "colored" newspaper from Philadelphia; editor of the Philadelphia Courant newspaper, and a journalist at the Philadelphia Daily Press. His office was in the Peoples Savings Bank building at 1508 Lombard Street in Philadelphia.

During the 1887 American Exhibition in London, Caldwell directed the Bureau of Information and "American Negro educated after Emancipation". He was the founder of the Negro Historical Society in 1897.

Caldwell died on May 11, 1917, in his home at 1706 North Woodstock Street in Philadelphia, Pennsylvania. A profile of Caldwell is included in the books, The Afro-American Press and Its Editors (1891), and Who's Who in Philadelphia: a collection of thirty biographical sketches of Philadelphia colored people (1912).
