= Asberry =

Asberry is both a given name and a surname. Notable people with the name include:

== Given name or middle name ==
- Roy Asberry Cooper III (born 1957), American politician

== Surname ==
- Alexander Asberry (1861 – abt. 1903), American politician
- Dallas Asberry (born 2001), American rapper
- Darrell Asberry (born 1972), American football coach
- Reuben Asberry Jr. (born 1980), American drag queen
- Nettie Craig Asberry (1865–1968), American civic leader and music educator
