= Charles H. Parrish =

American minister, educator, and activist (1859–1931)

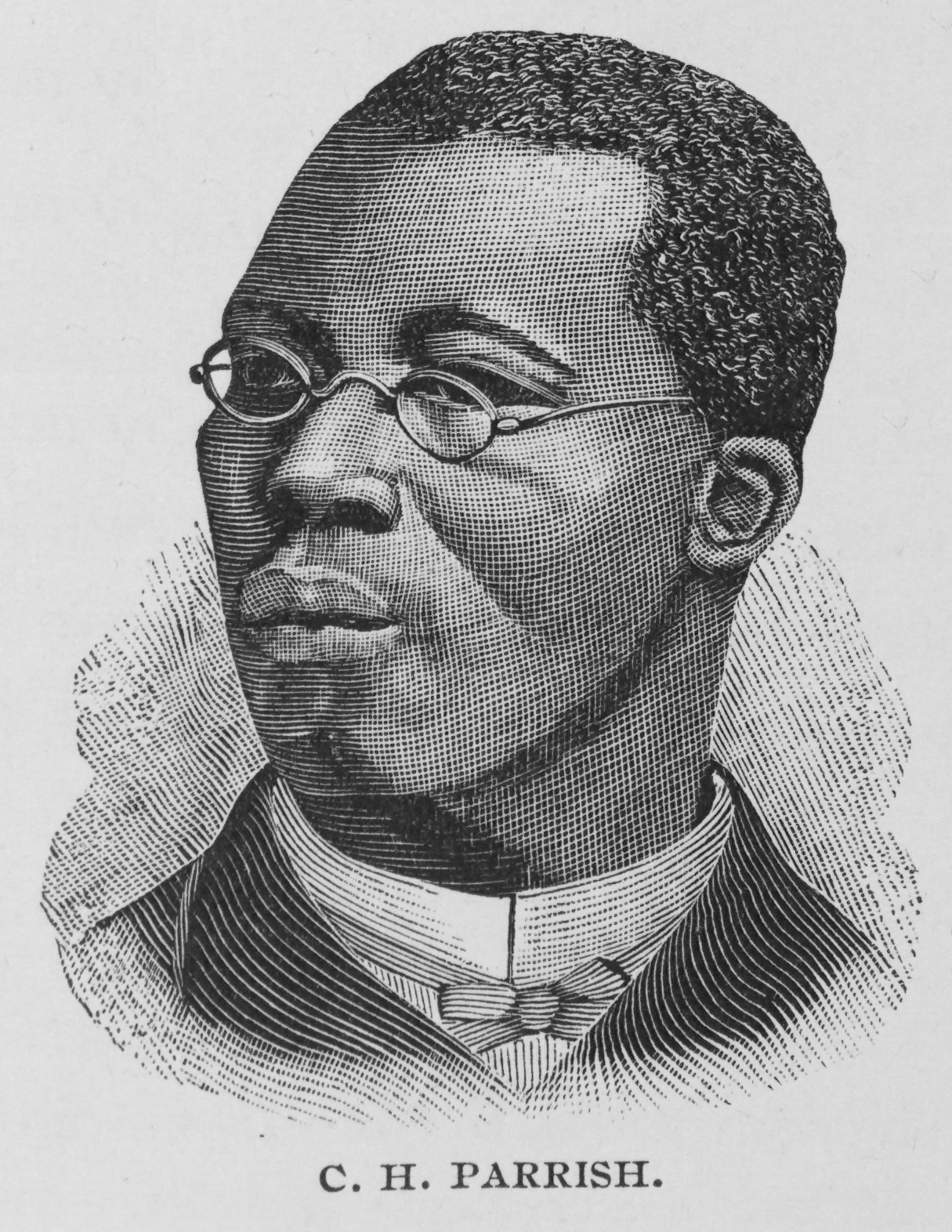
- Parrish in 1887
- Born: April 18, 1859; Lexington, Kentucky
- Died: May 8, 1931 (aged 72); Louisville, Kentucky
- Education: Nashville Institute, Simmons College of Kentucky
- Occupations: Minister, educator
- Political party: Republican
- Spouse: Mary Virginia Cook Parrish (m. 1898)
- Children: 2

Religious life
- Religion: Baptist

Charles Henry Parrish (April 18, 1859 – May 8, 1931) was an American minister and educator in Lexington and Louisville, Kentucky. He was the pastor at Calvary Baptist Church in Louisville from 1886 until his death in 1931. He was a professor and officer at Simmons College, and then served as the president of the Eckstein Institute from 1890 to 1912 and then of Simmons College from 1918 to 1931. His wife, Mary Virginia Cook Parrish and son, Charles H. Parrish Jr., were also noted educators.

== Early life ==
Parrish was born a slave in Lexington, Kentucky on April 18, 1859. His parents, Hiram and Harriet Parrish, belonged to Jeff Barr and Beverly Hicks. Hiram was a teamster and a deacon at Lexington's First Baptist Church led by London Ferrill, and Harriet was a seamstress. His father died on March 11, 1877, and his mother died on July 22, 1879. He also had a sister who was born in about 1867 who died in June 1880. As a child, Parrish attended Sunday school, and after emancipation, the public school in Lexington. In 1874 he left school to work as a porter at the dry goods store of John O. Hodges. In about 1880, he left the company to work for Cassell Price & Company until September.

== Education ==
Parrish was involved in his church, having been baptised at the age of 12. In 1872, he became secretary and teacher of the Sunday school. He also worked as church clerk and assistant instructor at the night school. His work as a teacher inspired him to continue his own education, and he quit work and enrolled at the Nashville Institute in September 1878. To help pay for his education, he worked as janitor of the Jackson Street public school during the nights and worked full-time during vacation. He graduated in 1882, and enrolled in the college course. He continued to work during school, now as a student-teacher, tutor, and bookkeeper. He graduated with an A. B. in May 1886. He was then appointed secretary and treasurer of the State University, later known as Simmons College of Kentucky, as well as professor of Greek. He later received an A. M. and D. D. from the same school. He also received an LL.D. from Central Law School (Simmons College of Kentucky), and was granted an F. R. G. S. by the Royal Geographical Society in London, England.

== Early activism ==
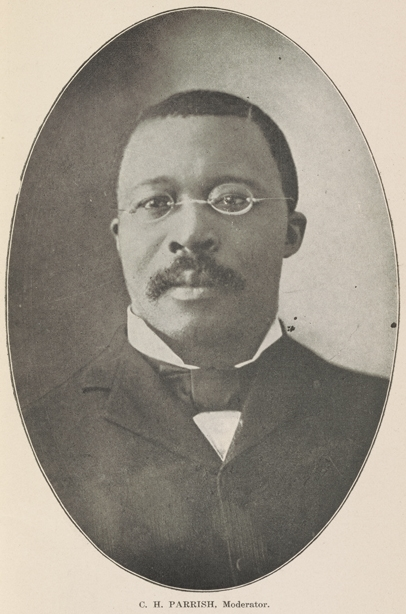
Parrish in 1915

Parrish was involved in political and civil rights activity, being a delegate to Republican state conventions, colored educational conventions, and the 1886 National Convention of Colored Men in Louisville, Kentucky, as well as religious activity as a delegate at the August 1886 American National Baptist Convention and the May 1887 Southern Baptist Convention. He was briefly a replacement pastor at Zion Baptist Church in Louisville, and January 2, 1886, was ordained. September 27, 1886, he became pastor of Calvary Baptist Church in Louisville. he served at Cavalry until his death in 1931.

== Education career ==
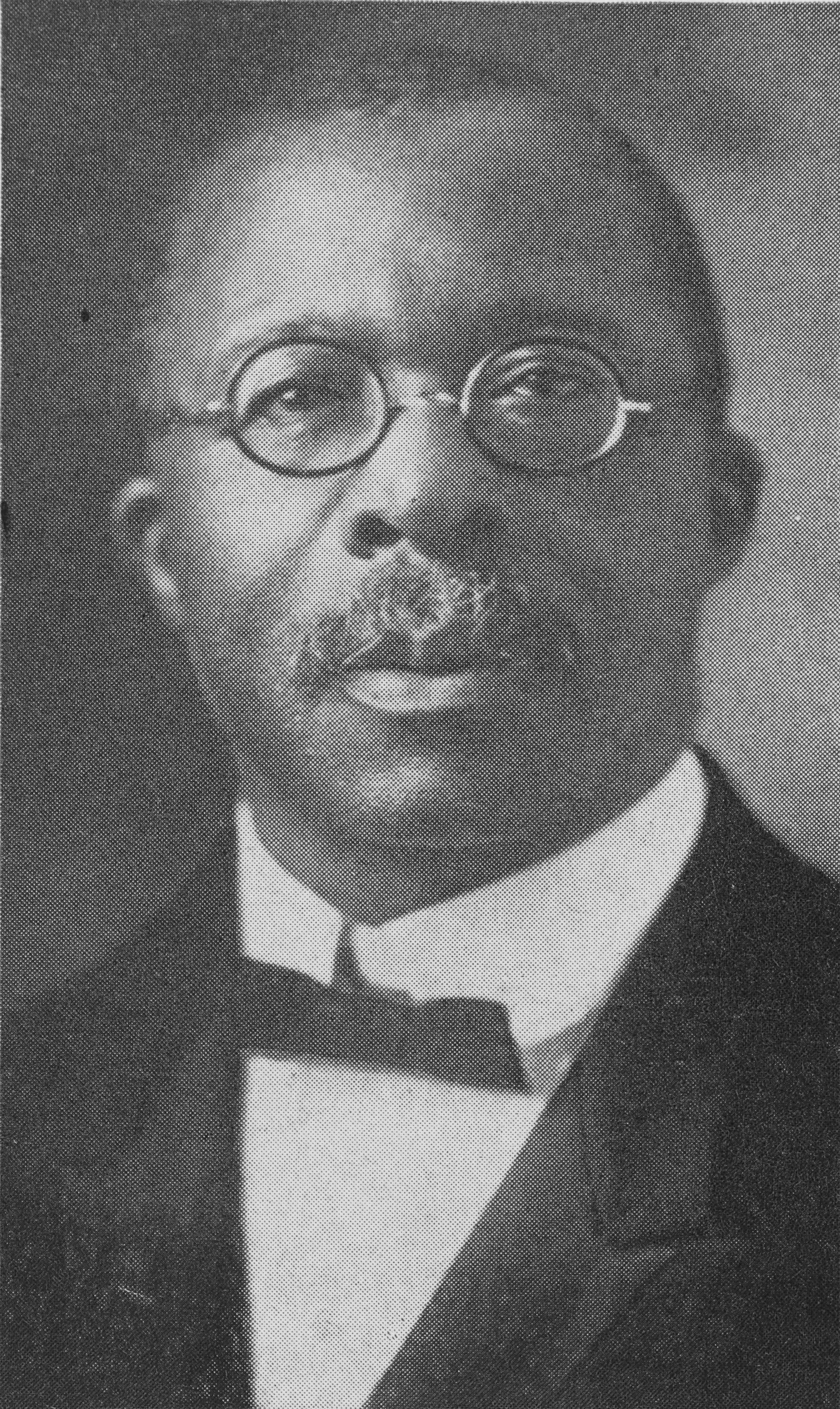
Parrish in 1921

In 1890, William J. Simmons, president of State University, resigned to create the Eckstein Norton Institute in Cane Springs, Kentucky, and Parrish moved to Eckstein with Simmons and served as president from Simmons' sudden death that year (1890) until 1912. In 1908 he established the Kentucky Home Society for Colored Children in Louisville. He was secretary of the Board of Trustees of the Lincoln Institute from 1909 to 1919. In 1912, the Eckstein Institute was merged with the Lincoln Institute, and Parrish remained involved in the schools. In 1918, the Eckstein Institute fully dissolved and Parrish returned to Simmons College of Kentucky to become president, serving from 1918 to 1931. After Parrish's death, Simmons College of Kentucky was faced with financial trouble and sold to the University of Louisville. Parrish and his wife, Mary Virginia Cook Parrish, were central figures in African American Kentucky society. They were involved in the lives of many notable Kentuckians, for instance introducing noted businesswoman Madam C. J. Walker to Booker T. Washington.

== Other activities ==
In April 1904, Parrish made a pilgrimage to the Holy Land and a European tour. During this year he was a delegate to the Baptist World's Congress, a messenger to the World's Sunday School Convention in Jerusalem, and he preached in Germany with Karl Mascher. In 1915 he travelled to Jamaica for religious work.

== Family and death ==
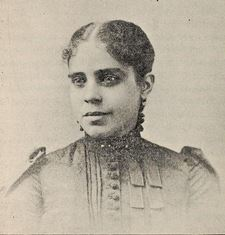
Parrish married educator Mary Virginia Cook in 1898

On January 26, 1898, Parrish married Mary Virginia Cook, a noted educator, of Bowling Green, Kentucky. They had two sons, Charles Henry Parrish Jr., who became a notable educator as well, and Frank Hawkins Parrish. Rev. Parrish died May 8, 1931, in Louisville and was buried in Louisville Cemetery.
