= Lucie Johnson Scruggs =

African-American educator and writer (1864–1892)

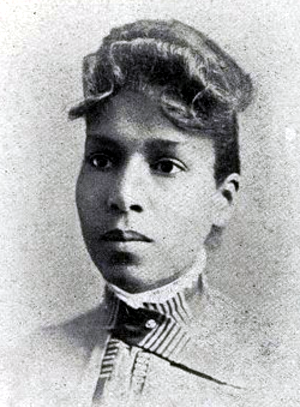
- Lucie Johnson Scruggs, from "Women of Distinction" (1893) by Lawson A. Scruggs
- Born: Lucie Johnson; October 14, 1864; Richmond, Virginia
- Died: November 24, 1892 (aged 28)
- Education: Shaw University
- Occupations: educator, writer

Lucie Johnson Scruggs (née Johnson; October 14, 1864 - November 24, 1892) was an American educator and writer from Virginia. She was born into slavery and was married to fellow writer Lawson A. Scruggs.

== Early years and education ==
Lucie Johnson was the youngest of four children, and was born a slave in Richmond, Virginia, October 14, 1864. She was partly of Native American heritage. Until she was nine years old, she knew few people apart from her mother's slaveowner's grandchildren.

Scruggs entered the city's public schools in 1873 aged nine years. Her sister was then in the fourth grade. Scruggs was promoted twice every session, showing an unusual talent for mathematics. When she was fourteen she joined the First Baptist Church of Richmond. She was kept out of school for two winters by illness attributed to "rapid growth" and they decided to try a change of climate. She left Richmond to attend Shaw University at Raleigh, North Carolina. She graduated in May, 1883, and moved to New York City to join her mother.

== Career ==
In October 1883, shortly after the death of her only brother, Scruggs went to Chatham, Virginia to teach. In May 1884, she returned to New York, and opened a private school for girls with her sister. They managed it for four years and she wrote articles for the Richmond Planet and similar journals. In 1886, she published a grammar book designed for beginners, entitled Grammar-Land.

Lucie Johnson met Lawson Andrew Scruggs at Shaw University and they married on February 22, 1888. They were married at St. Mark's Methodist Episcopal Church, New York by Rev. Henry Lyman Morehouse. Soon after, she wrote a drama, Farmer Fox. She and her husband moved to Raleigh where she joined the Blount Street Baptist Church. Scruggs was a member of the Second Baptist Church and the King's Daughters' Missionary Society. She organized and was twice elected president of the Pansy Literary Society.

Scruggs had two children, Leonard and Goldie. She died November 24, 1892, at the age of 28 after a brief illness. The following year, Lawson Scruggs published a book titled "Women of Distinction" and he included his late wife.
