= Lawson A. Scruggs =

American physician (1857–1914)

Lawson Andrew Scruggs
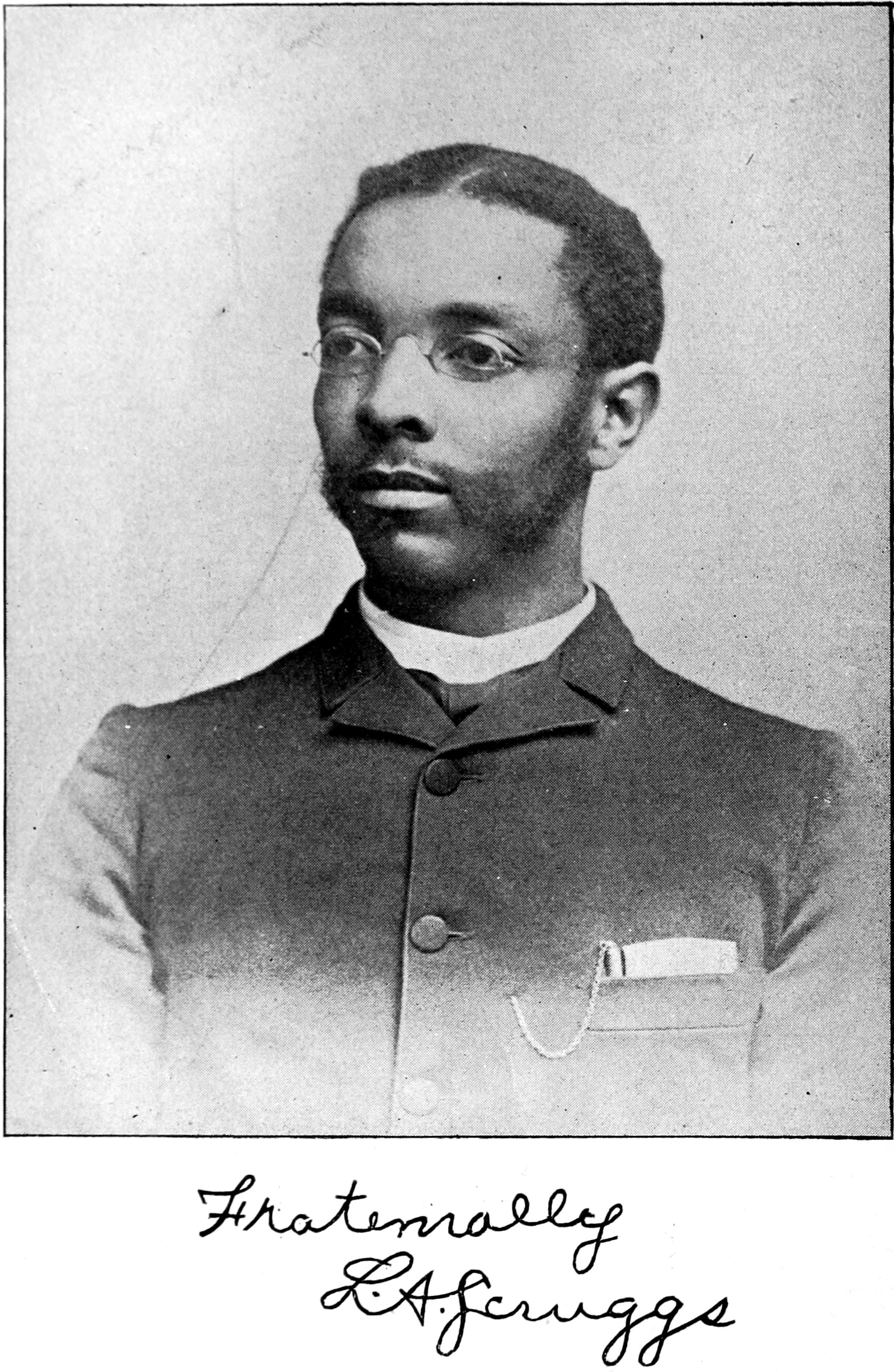
- Born: January 15, 1857; Bedford, Virginia, US
- Died: December 1, 1914 (aged 57); Raleigh, North Carolina, US
- Education: Shaw University
- Occupations: physician, writer
- Political party: Republican
- Spouse(s): Lucie Johnson (1864–1892); Phoebe Turner (1856–1939)

Lawson Andrew Scruggs (January 15, 1857 – December 1, 1914) was a physician in North Carolina who was active in politics and civil rights. He was African American. In 1893, he published a volume of biographies of African-American Women, Women of Distinction.

== Early life ==
Lawson Scruggs was born enslaved in Virginia in 1857 to George W. and Maria W. Scruggs. shortly before the start of the American Civil War (1861–1865). His education was funded by the American Baptist Home Mission Society, and he earned a medical degree from Leonard Medical School at Shaw University in 1887.

== Career ==
Lawson Andrew Scruggs met Lucie Johnson at Shaw University and they married on 22 February 1888. They were married at St. Mark's Methodist Episcopal Church, New York by Rev. Henry Lyman Morehouse. They moved to Raleigh where his wife joined the Second Baptist Church and various intellectual organisations.

After gaining their medical degrees from Shaw, Scruggs and two of his classmates, J. T. Williams and Manassa Thomas Pope, were denied membership in the North Carolina Medical Association. Together with A. B. Moore, they organized a new society, the Old North State Medical Society. In the late 1890s, Scruggs became attending physician at St. Agnes Hospital in Raleigh, North Carolina. He also served on the faculty at Leonard Medical School.

In the late 1890s and early 1900s, violence in North Carolina against blacks intensified, and many blacks emigrated West. Scruggs, Shaw classmates J. T. Williams and Manassa Pope, James H. Young, Samuel Vick, and Henry Cheatham were central in efforts to organize black Republican support for those who remained. Scruggs was politically sought stability and interracial harmony, a position which occasionally put him at odds with state Republican leader, Daniel Lindsay Russell.

Scruggs was an advocate for African American Women. In 1893, two separate volumes about African American women, Noted Negro Women by Monroe Alpheus Majors and Women of Distinction by Scruggs, were published in 1893. Scruggs believed that African American women were greatly mistreated, and that in order to achieve eminence, it is necessary for an African American women to have "fought a fierce and bloody battle almost every step of her way."
