= Hearne Academy =

Dissolved African-American school

Hearne Academy, founded in 1881, was a school for African Americans during the post-Reconstruction era in Hearne, Texas. In 1896 it had 75 students and five teachers. It was renamed and relocated in 1909 to become Fort Worth Industrial and Mechanical College in Fort Worth, Texas. The new college was modeled after Tuskegee Institute, but it struggled financially and closed in 1929.

The school was supported by Baptist organizations. It offered elementary through secondary, college preparatory, and industrial classes.

R. J. Moore, a black member of the Texas House of Representatives from Washington County from 1883 to 1888, studied at Hearne Academy. Major J. Johnson was its president in 1916. Elizabeth Stumm, a teacher and writer who was married to a missionary priest, taught at the school. She was African American.

== Alumni ==
- Alexander Asberry, state legislator
- Robert J. Moore, state legislator
