= Robert J. Moore =

American teacher and politician

Texas State Representative from District 71 (Washington County)
- In office January 9, 1883 – January 8, 1889
- Preceded by: James Gray
- Succeeded by: Myers Felder

Member of the Washington County Commission

Personal details
- Born: c. 1844 Navasota, Texas, USA
- Party: Republican
- Children: 3
- Education: Hearne Academy
- Occupation: Teacher, postmaster, politician

Robert James Moore (c. 1844–?) was a teacher and Republican politician who served three terms in the Texas Legislature. He was born in Navasota, Texas in 1844. After the American Civil War, he became active in the Republican Party. He first served as a county commissioner, and was then elected to the 18th Legislature. He took office in 1883, representing the 71st District, in Washington County. He was re-elected twice. During the 1886 election cycle, Moore was jointly endorsed by the People's Party. In his first two terms, Moore lived in Brenham, and moved to Washington in his final term.

He was married and had three children.

== See also ==
- African American officeholders from the end of the Civil War until before 1900
