= Lincoln Institute (Kentucky) =

School in Kentucky, US (1912–1966)

- Lincoln Institute Complex
- U.S. National Register of Historic Places
- U.S. Historic district
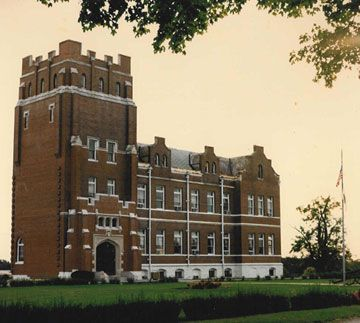
- Berea Hall, the main administrative and classroom building at the Lincoln Institute
- Nearest city: Simpsonville, Kentucky
- Area: 21.8 acres (8.8 ha)
- Built: 1910
- Built by: Lynn Gruber
- Architect: G. W. Foster & W. V. Tandy (Berea Hall)
- Landscape architect: Frederick Law Olmsted
- Architectural style: Tudor Revival
- MPS: Shelby County MRA
- NRHP reference No.: 88002926
- Added to NRHP: December 27, 1988

Lincoln Institute was an all-black private boarding high school in near Simpsonville in Shelby County, Kentucky, active from 1912 to 1966.

== History ==
The school was funded by the trustees of Berea College, after the Day Law of 1904 passed the Kentucky Legislature; which ended the racially integrated education at Berea. The founders of the school chose the name Lincoln when they realized that there was no educational institution in the state of Kentucky named after the president.

The founders originally intended Lincoln to be a junior college as well as a high school, but by the 1930s it gave up its junior college function. Lincoln offered both vocational education and standard high school classes. The students produced the school's food on the campus' 444 acres (180 ha).

A. Eugene Thomson was the school's first principal. Whitney M. Young Sr. was its first African American president.

In 1909, discussions began around a merger between the newly formed Lincoln Institute and the Eckstein Norton Institute located in the rural town of Cane Spring (now Lotus) in Bullitt County, Kentucky, which was finalized in 1912.

The rise of integrated education as a result of the civil rights movement reduced the need for general high schools like Lincoln, and in 1966, the Lincoln Institute closed.

== Campus after closure ==
The campus was used for the Lincoln School for the Gifted, a school for gifted but disadvantaged children, from 1966 to 1970 which was led by former science teacher Samuel Robinson.

Since 1972, the old Lincoln campus has been used as the Whitney M. Young Jr. Job Corps Center, a U.S. Department of Labor Job Corps Center. The Center opened in 1972 and is named for Whitney M. Young Jr., a civil rights leader and Lincoln Institute alumnus. The center provides academic and career training to students on a residential and non-residential basis. The center is administered as part of the Job Corps programs Philadelphia region.

Whitney M. Young Jr. was a prominent leader of the Civil Rights Movement and director of the National Urban League from 1961 to 1971. He was born on the campus of the Lincoln Institute in 1921 when his father, Whitney Young Sr., was president of the institute and was later an alumnus.

The campus also houses the Whitney Young Birthplace and Museum, a National Historic Landmark that presents the story of the Lincoln Institute and Whitney Young Jr. Just adjacent to the entrance to the campus a historical marker and memorial commemorates the massacre of 22 members of the 5th U.S. Colored Cavalry (USCC) by Confederate guerrillas during the American Civil War.

Today, the Lincoln Foundation, which was established along with the school, carries on the work of the Lincoln Institute by providing educational programs for disadvantaged youths in the Louisville area and preserving the Lincoln Institute's historic legacy.

In 2024, services at the Whitney Young Job Corps program, a federal facility were suspended. A historical marker recounts some of the school's history.

== See also ==
- 5th United States Colored Cavalry Regiment
- 6th United States Colored Cavalry
- Mae Street Kidd
