= Susie Lankford Shorter =

American educator, philanthropist, and writer

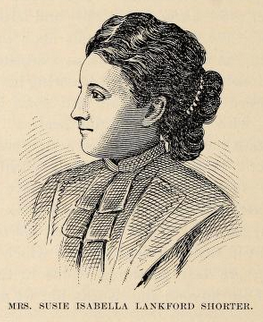
- Susie Isabel Lankford Shorter, from an 1893 publication.
- Born: Susan Isabel Lankford; January 4, 1859; Terre Haute, Indiana
- Died: February 23, 1912 (aged 53)
- Known for: Educator, writer
- Notable work: "Lifting as We Climb"
- Spouse: Joseph Proctor Shorter (m. 1878–1910) his death

Susie Isabel Lankford Shorter (January 4, 1859 – February 23, 1912) was an American educator, philanthropist, and writer.

== Early life ==
Susan Isabel (or Isabella) Lankford was born in Terre Haute, Indiana, the daughter of Whitten Strange Lankford and Clarissa Carter Lankford. Her father was a minister in the African Methodist Episcopal Church. She was educated at Wilberforce University in Ohio.

== Career ==
Susie Lankford taught for a few years before she married. As a faculty wife at Wilberforce, she ran a student store, offered a free kindergarten for local children, and provided care for sick students in her home. She was president of the Wilberforce Ladies' College Aid Society.

Shorter wrote articles for church publications. Her booklet "Heroines of African Methodism" (1891) was written to celebrate the eightieth birthday of Bishop Daniel Payne. "We are proud of our women," she wrote. "Little has been written concerning them. They are walking in all life's avenues successfully, daring and doing what the women of other varieties of the human race dare and do." She also wrote a column, "Plain Talk to Our Girls", for Ringwood's Afro-American Journal of Fashion, published by Julia Ringwood Coston.

She wrote the song, "Lifting as We Climb", for the Ohio chapter of the National Association of Colored Women's Clubs.

== Personal life ==
Susie Isabel Lankford married Joseph Proctor Shorter, a professor at Wilberforce University, in 1878. They had eight children together; at least three of their children died before reaching their teens. Susie Lankford Shorter was widowed in 1910 and died in 1912, aged 53 years.
