= Our Women and Children =

African-American magazine

Founder William J. Simmons

Our Women and Children was a magazine published in Louisville, Kentucky by the American Baptist, the state Baptist newspaper. Founded in 1888 by William J. Simmons, president of State University, the magazine featured the work of African-American women journalists and covered both juvenile literature and articles focusing on uplifting the race. The magazine staff was made up of women who had an affiliation with State University. Of the hundreds of magazines begun in the United States between 1890 and 1950, very few gave editorial control or ownership to African American Women. Our Women and Children was one of them. It had a national reputation and became the leading black magazine in Kentucky before it folded in 1891 after Simmons' death.

Several well-known journalists were associated with the magazine, including: Mary E. Britton, correspondent; Lucretia Newman Coleman, correspondent; Georgia Mabel DeBaptiste, contributor; Lillian A. Lewis, correspondent; Mrs. N. F. Mossell, correspondent; Mary Virginia Cook Parrish, editor of the Education Department; Lucy Wilmot Smith, editor of the Woman's Department; Lavinia B. Sneed, correspondent; Mrs. C. C. Stumm, correspondent; Ida B. Wells, correspondent; Ione E. Wood, editor of the Temperance Department;
