= Eckstein Norton Institute =

School in Kentucky, US, 1890–1912

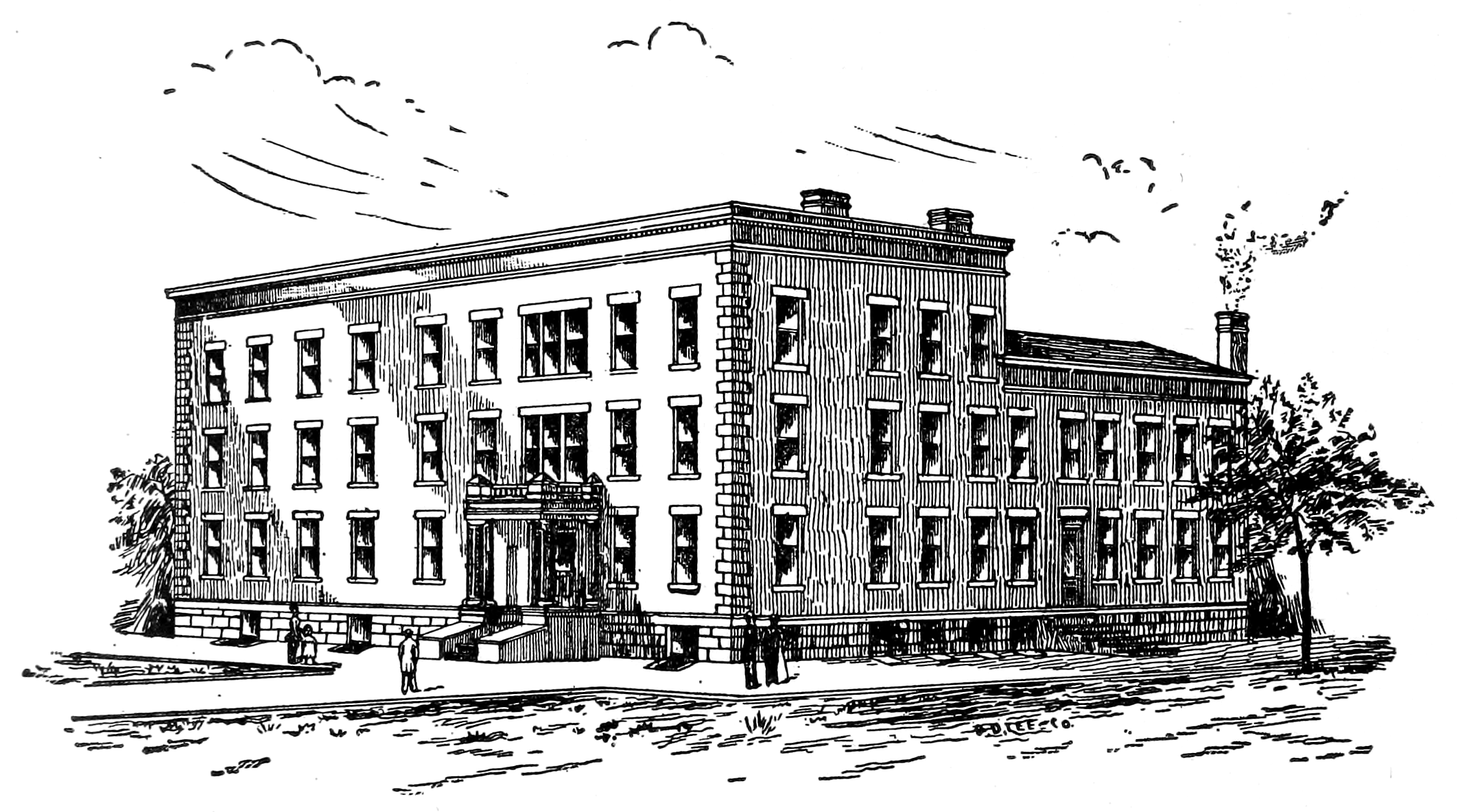

Location
- Cane Spring (now Lotus), Bullitt County, Kentucky, U.S. 37.922473°N 85.580510°W

Information
- Other name: Eckstein Norton University
- School type: Private Vocational African American
- Established: 1890
- Founders: William J. Simmons; Charles H. Parrish

Eckstein Norton Institute was a private vocational school for African American students founded in 1890 in the rural town of Cane Spring (now Lotus) in Bullitt County, Kentucky, 30 miles south of Louisville, Kentucky. In 1912, the school merged into the Lincoln Institute in Shelby County, Kentucky. It was also known as Eckstein Norton University.

== History ==
Dr. William J. Simmons and the Rev. Charles H. Parrish helped organized the school. In 1890, the school opened as Eckstein Norton Institute, named for donor Eckstein Norton (1831–1893), the president of the Louisville and Nashville Railroad. In the first year of operations William J. Simmons died, and Charles H. Parrish assumed the role of principal.

It was located in the rural town of Cane Spring (sometimes written as Cane Springs; now Lotus) in Bullitt County, Kentucky, 30 miles south of Louisville, Kentucky. The 75 acres (30 ha) campus was near the Cane Springs Depot on the railroad line from Bardstown Junction running eastward. It had a brick main building with twenty-five rooms, five frame buildings with twenty rooms for dormitories and assembly halls, a printing office, and a laundry and blacksmith shop. The school offered classes in shorthand, literary studies, science classes, music, photography, oil painting, business classes, dressmaking, cooking, telegraphy, printing, poultry raising, sericulture, cabinetmaking, tailoring, and carpentry.

Teacher Harriet Gibbs Marshall ran the music program at the school, and Mary Virginia Cook Parrish taught Latin and mathematics. Eckstein Norton Institute was known for their music conservatory, and it was the first music program in the United States led by Black teachers.

An advertisement for the school ran in an 1891 issue of the Ohio Falls Express. On January 24, 1892, the main campus building was burned down from a fire started in the flue on the upper floor. By September 1892, a new building was completed to replace the main campus building.

"The accommodations are not adequate to the demands upon them," reported the Courier-Journal in 1902.

== Merger and historical marker ==
The Day Law in Kentucky passed in 1904, which was a mandated racial segregation for educational institutions in the state, and designated "An Act to Prohibit White and Colored Persons from Attending the Same School." This was a law specifically aimed at Berea College in Berea, Kentucky which at the time was the only racially integrated college. As a result, the trustees of Berea College raised the funds to open a separate school for African American students, and the land was purchased near Simpsonville, Kentucky to form Lincoln Institute. In 1909, discussions began around the idea of a merger between Eckstein Norton Institute and the new Lincoln Institute, which was finalized in 1912.

In 2024, the former Eckstein Norton Institute campus property was rediscovered, and a Kentucky State Highway Marker was added.

== See also ==
- Berea College v. Kentucky (1908), US Supreme Court case
