= Wesley AME Zion Church =

Historic church in Pennsylvania, United States

- U.S. National Register of Historic Places
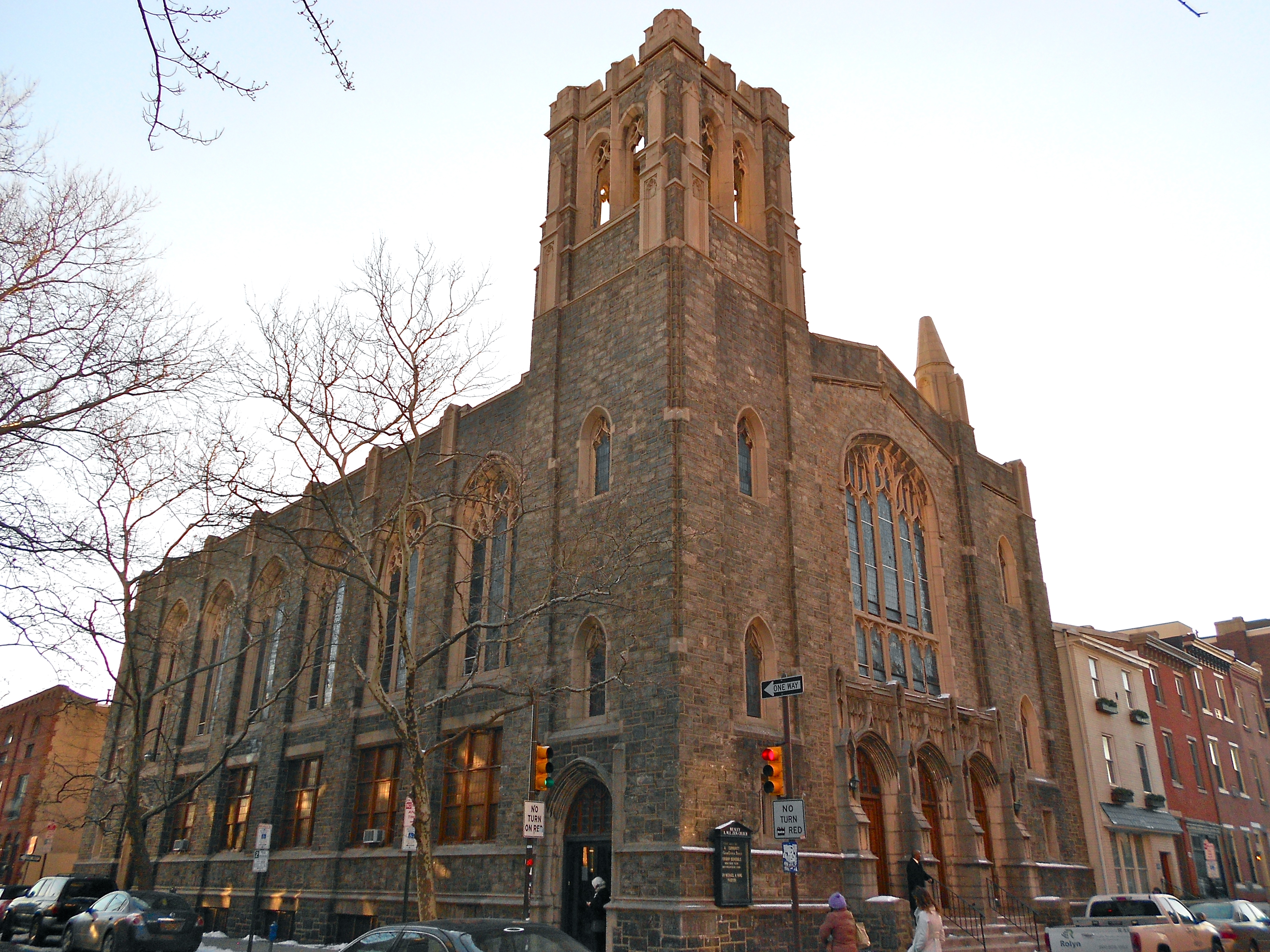

- Location within Philadelphia Location within Pennsylvania Location within the United States
- Location: 1500 Lombard Street, Philadelphia, Pennsylvania
- Coordinates: 39°56′40″N 75°10′5″W
- Area: 0.2 acres (0.081 ha)
- Built: 1926
- Architectural style: Gothic
- NRHP reference No.: 78002461
- Added to NRHP: December 01, 1978

Wesley A.M.E. Zion Church (also known as Big Wesley) is an historic church, which is located at 1500 Lombard Street in Philadelphia, Pennsylvania. Added to the National Register of Historic Places in 1978, it also appears in the Philadelphia Register of Historic Places and the Pennsylvania State Historic Resource survey.

== History and architectural features ==
The congregation was founded on June 6, 1820. Worship began in a Carpenter's Shed at 521-527 Lombard Street while a brick church building was under construction.

In 1885, the congregation purchased an existing building and moved to its current location at 1500 Lombard Street. The church later commissioned a larger structure to accommodate a growing congregation.

Designed by architect George Savage, the church was built in 1926 in the Gothic Revival style with a corner bell tower, spire, and pointed arch windows with tracery. The main level is accessed through triple-portal doors which open to a foyer flanked on both sides by grand staircases. The church sanctuary is located on the second floor and contains a large U-shaped balcony and is brightly lit by stained glass windows on all sides.

"Big Wesley" has been a historical leader in the development of the African Methodist Episcopal Zion Church denomination and influential in civil rights and social reforms in the 1950s and 1960s.

The church continues to hold weekly worship service, bible study, and outreach ministry activities. The current pastor is Rev. Michael A. King. Former pastors include the Right Reverend Louis Hunter, Sr., 93rd Bishop of the African Methodist Episcopal Zion Church.

The church was added to the National Register of Historic Places in 1978. It also appears in the Philadelphia Register of Historic Places and the Pennsylvania State Historic Resource survey.

== Gallery ==
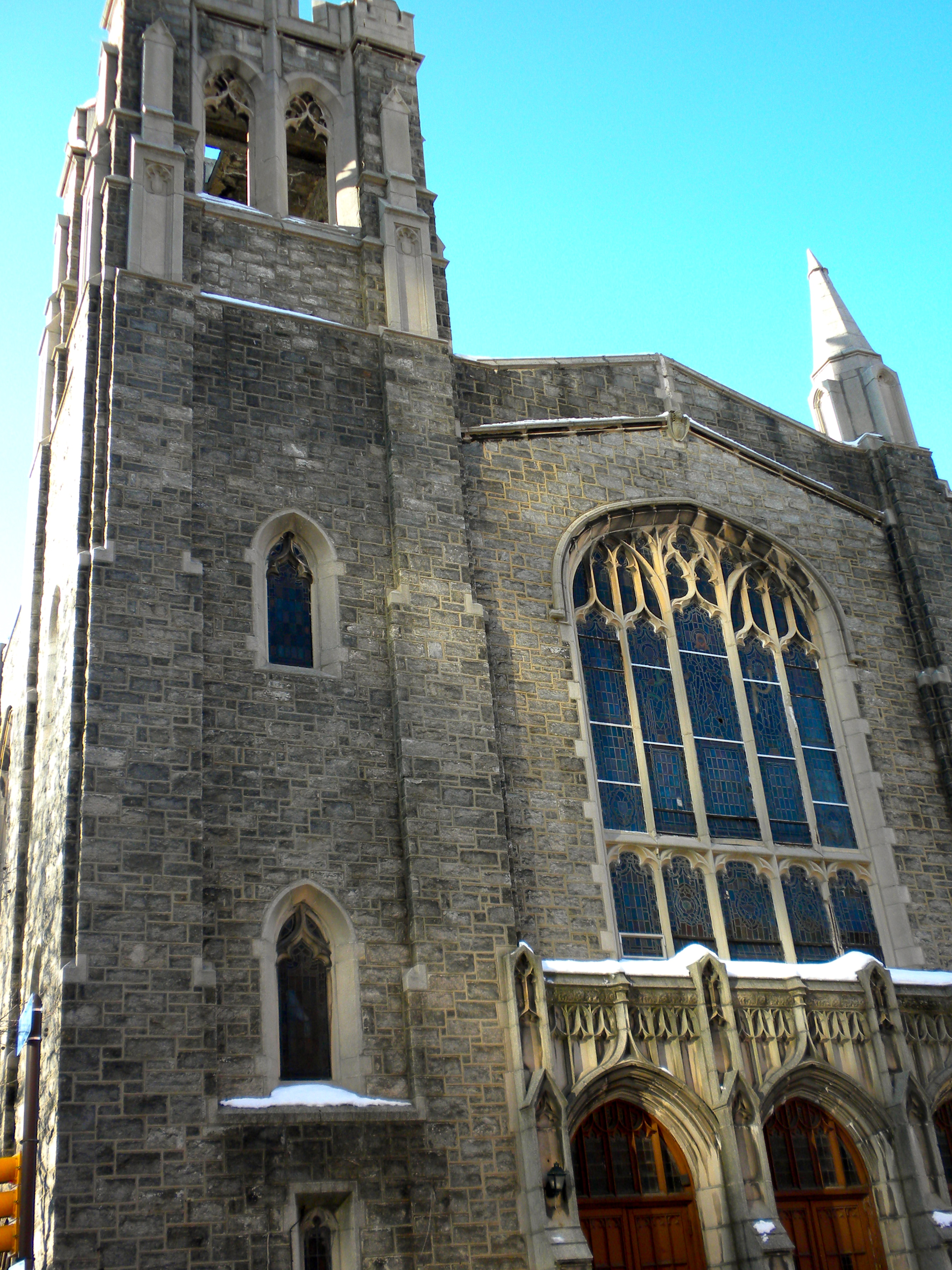
Wesley AME Church
