= Louise De Mortie =

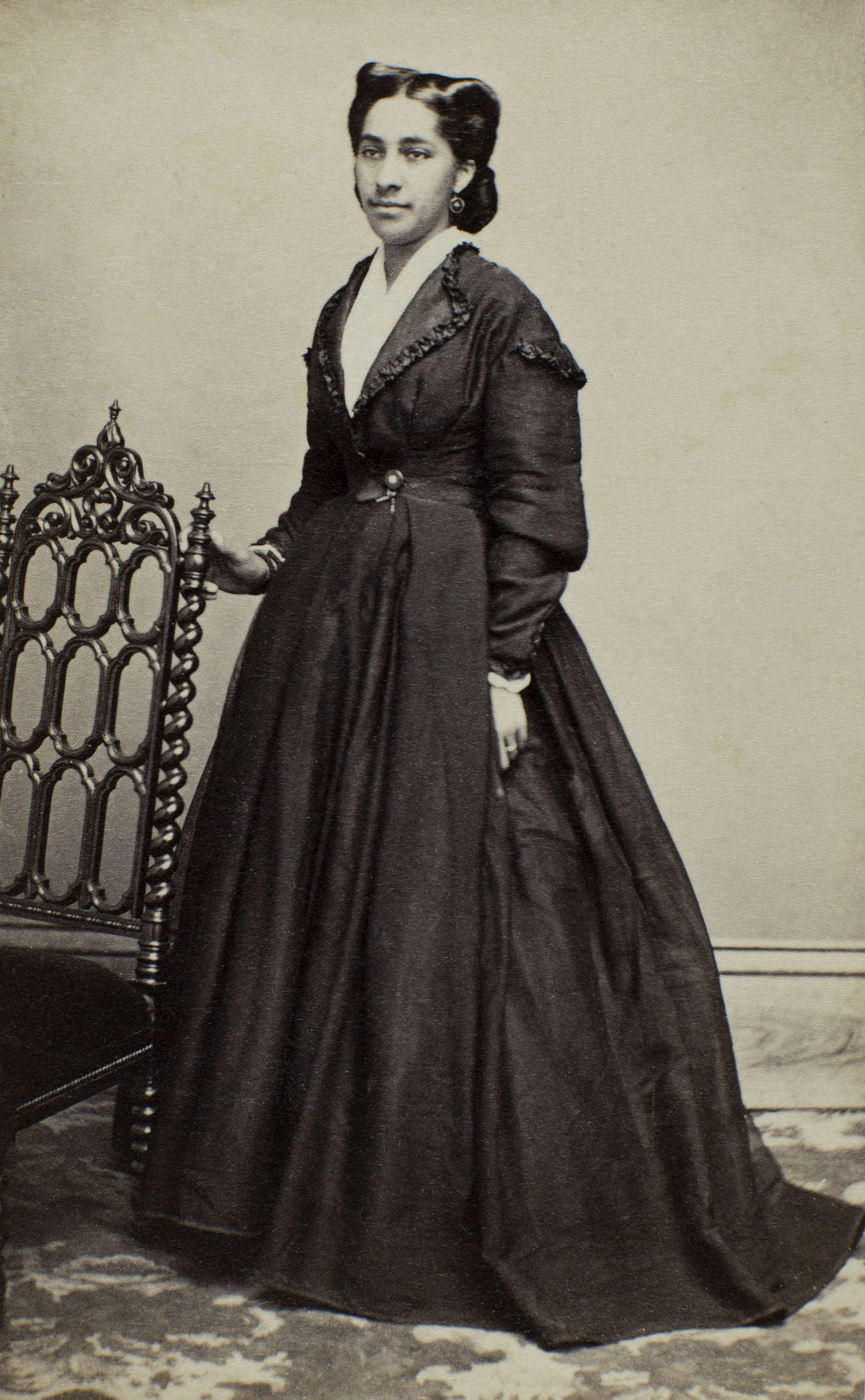
- Louise De Mortie in New Orleans, c. 1865
- Born: c. 1833; Norfolk, Virginia
- Died: October 10, 1867 (aged 33–34); New Orleans, Louisiana
- Spouse(s): John Oliver, ending in divorce

Louise De Mortie (c. 1833 – October 10, 1867) was an African-American lecturer and fundraiser. She devoted herself to aiding black children orphaned during the American Civil War.

She was born free in Norfolk, Virginia and moved to Boston in 1853. De Mortie was known as a public speaker and as a popular singer. She moved to New Orleans in 1863 to help black orphans in that city. She raised funds in support of the Colored Orphans Home there and served as its manager.

She married John Oliver, an African-American carpenter and abolitionist; the couple divorced in 1862.

De Mortie died of yellow fever in New Orleans.
