= Lotus, Kentucky =

Unincorporated community in Kentucky, United States

Lotus
- Unincorporated community
- Location within the state of Kentucky Lotus (the United States)
- Coordinates: 37°55′8″N 85°35′48″W
- Country: United States
- State: Kentucky
- County: Bullitt
- Elevation: 656 ft (200 m)
- Time zone: UTC-5 (Eastern (EST))
  - Summer (DST): UTC-4 (EST)
- GNIS feature ID: 508508

Lotus is an unincorporated community in Bullitt County, Kentucky, United States.

The Eckstein Norton Institute (1890–1912), a private vocational school for African American students, was located in Lotus, when the community was called Cane Spring.
