= Nettie Craig Asberry =

African-American leader, music teacher (1865–1968)

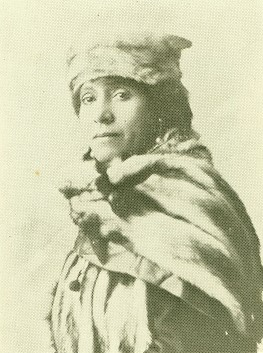
- Nettie J. Asberry, 1925
- Born: Nettie J. Craig; July 15, 1865; Leavenworth, Kansas
- Died: November 17, 1968 (aged 103); Tacoma, Washington
- Resting place: Oakwood Hill Cemetery
- Spouses: Albert Jones (m.1890-1893; his death); Henry Joseph Asberry (m.1895-1939; his death)
- Parents: William Wallingford (father); Violet Craig (mother)

Nettie Asberry (July 15, 1865 – November 17, 1968) was an African-American leader, music teacher, and centenarian who helped to found the Tacoma NAACP and was active in the Washington State Association of Colored Women's Clubs.

== Early life in Kansas ==
Nettie J. Craig was born in Leavenworth, Kansas, the daughter of Violet Craig, a former slave, and William Wallingford, who owned the plantation where Craig had been enslaved. Asberry was the youngest of Craig's six children, and the only one who was born free. She started studying piano at age eight. Taking advantage of the free tuition at the time, she enrolled and graduated from the University of Kansas and then earned her Doctorate of Music from the Kansas Conservatory of Music and Elocution in Leavenworth, Kansas, on June 12, 1883, a month before her eighteenth birthday. It is possible that she was the first African-American woman to earn a doctorate degree.

== From Kansas to Seattle and back ==
After college, Asberry taught music and performed in choirs in Nicodemus, Kansas, Kansas City, Missouri, and Denver, Colorado. She married Albert Jones, and the two of them moved to Seattle, Washington to take advantage of the opportunities available there in the midst of the rebuilding of the city after the Great Seattle Fire of 1889. Shortly after arriving, Asberry became first organist and music director for the First African Methodist Episcopal Church. When Albert Jones died in 1893, however, she returned briefly to her family in Kansas.

== Settling in Tacoma ==
After her husband's death in 1893, Asberry moved to Tacoma with her family. This was where she became one of the founding members of the Tacoma Chapter of the National Association for the Advancement of Colored People (NAACP) chapter. She tried to fight segregation in Tacoma and Fort Lewis and established the Tacoma City Association of Colored Women's Clubs before traveling around to promote similar ideas, and was provided a federation throughout the state. Asberry was a longtime resident of Tacoma and taught children music and was a choir director at Allen African Methodist Episcopal Church, which she was able to do using her PhD. It has also been considered that she was the first African American woman to ever receive a PhD.

== Legacy ==
The Tacoma City Association of Colored Women’s Clubs (Tacoma CWC) named the Asberry Culture Club, named in Asberry's honor.

On January 4, 2022, the Tacoma City Council designated the Henry J. and Nettie Craig Asberry House a city landmark. That same week the Tacoma CWC bought the historic Asberry House. Six months later, Tacoma CWC received funding from the National Trust for Historic Preservation's African American Cultural Heritage Action Fund to be used for the purpose of preserving and interpreting Asberry's home.
