= Sarah Gibson Jones =

American journalist, educator, and poet (1843–1938)

- Born: 1843
- Died: 1938

Sarah Gibson Jones (1843 – 1938) was an African American educator, journalist, poet, lecturer, and clubwoman. She may have been the first Black female journalist in the United States.

== Early life ==
Sarah Gibson Jones was born in 1843 in Alexandria, Virginia. She moved with her family to Cincinnati, Ohio. She studied with private tutors and at the Colored Public Schools. She studied at the University of Cincinnati.

== Career ==
Sarah Gibson worked as a governess and teacher. In 1862, she worked for J.P. Sampson at the Colored Citizen, and was likely the first Black female journalist in the United States. In 1863, she began teaching for the Cincinnati Colored School Board. From 1875 to 1911, she taught in the Elm Street Colored School in Walnut Hills, Cincinnati. In 1904, she joined the Federation of Colored Women's Clubs. The Ohio State Federation of the National Association of Colored Women's Clubs named her their poet laureate.

== Personal life ==
In 1865, she married Marshall P. H. Jones. They had three children, though only Joseph Lawrence Jones survived past infancy.

Sarah Gibson Jones died on 21 October 1938.
