= Lillian A. Lewis =

African-American journalist

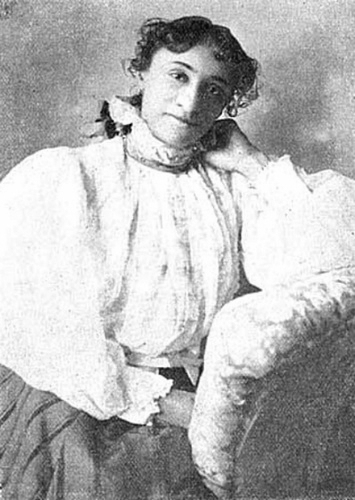
- Lillian A. Lewis circa 1897
- Born: 1869
- Education: Boston Normal School
- Occupation: Journalist

Lillian A. Lewis (born in 1869) was the first African American woman journalist in Boston, Massachusetts. She started her career in the 1880s with the Boston Advocate, a Black community newspaper, and began writing for the Boston Herald in the 1890s. To disguise her gender, she used the pen name "Bert Islew."

== Background ==
Lillian Alberta Lewis was born in 1869 in Boston, Massachusetts. She was born at 66 Phillips Street in Beacon Hill, in the home of Lewis Hayden, who was a Black abolitionist and master of Boston's Underground Railroad. She attended the Bowdoin Grammar School, Girls' High School where she graduated in 1886, and Boston Normal School.

Lewis was reportedly a gifted student with an interest in literature. While in high school, she began writing and delivering lectures on subjects such as temperance, usually with a thread of humor running through them. One lecture that was especially popular was "The Mantle of the Church Covereth a Multitude of Humbugs," which poked fun at pious hypocrisy.

On August 7, 1901, she married Ernest F. Feurtado, a Jamaican.

== Career ==
Lewis began writing for the Boston Advocate in 1889, using the pen name "Bert Islew" to disguise her gender. ("Islew" is an anagram of "Lewis".) That same year, she made headlines when she was admitted to the New England Woman's Press Association. Sales had been flagging when Lewis joined the Advocate, and her popular society column, They-Say, is credited with saving the paper. She also contributed to the Richmond Planet and a monthly magazine called Our Women and Children, wrote short stories, and contributed to various journals. Monroe Alpheus Majors wrote of Lewis's work in 1893, "Her pen, as the sword, is ever drawn in defense of her race, and those who have had the honor of crossing weapons with her generally retire from the combat feeling that they have been vigorously fought."

In 1889, The New York Journal referred to Lewis as "bright, witty, sparking, and of practical thought."

In the 1890s, she began working for the Boston Herald as a stenographer and reporter. (A Boston Post announcement in 1892 refers to her as the Herald's "society editress".) She was one of the first African American women to write for a white-run newspaper. Lewis's knowledge of type-writing secured her a position as private secretary to Max Eliot.

In 1894, Lewis was living on Myrtle Street in Beacon Hill and was considered one of the two "most brilliant and progressive young colored women in Boston." She was a stylish dresser, and moved with ease between Boston's elite South End and West End social circles. She continued writing for the Boston Herald until 1901.

Lewis was also a public speaker, as she was invited to give talks to organizations such as the Colored National League.

In 1920, Lewis became the first African American woman clerk in the Collector's Office at Boston City Hall. She retired in 1934.

== Published works ==
In 1925, Lewis published a book titled Peter Salem: Colored American Soldier of the American Revolution.
