= Alexander Asberry =

American politician (1861–c.1903)

- Asberry's portrait for the 21st Texas Legislature

Member of the Texas House of Representatives from the 48th district
- In office January 8, 1889 – January 13, 1891
- Preceded by: Martin Van Buren Garner
- Succeeded by: Jacob Leonard Goodman

Personal details
- Born: November 2, 1861 Wilderville, Texas, Confederate States of America
- Died: c. 1896 – c. 1903 (aged 35-42) Robertson County, Texas, US
- Party: Republican
- Occupation: Politician

Alexander Asberry (November 2, 1861 – c. 1896 – c. 1903) was an American politician. A Republican, he was a member of the Texas House of Representatives.

== Early life ==
Asberry was born on November 2, 1861, Wilderville, Texas (then part of the Confederate States of America), the son of William Asberry and Julia Asberry. He was born a slave. He studied at the Hearne Academy and worked as a grocer. He lived in Calvert.

== Politics ==
Asberry was a Republican. He was a delegate to the 1888 and 1892 Republican National Conventions. In 1884, he unsuccessfully ran for the Texas House of Representatives. He ran again in 1888, winning. He served from January 8, 1889, to January 13, 1891, representing the 48th district.

While serving, Asberry was a member of the Committees on County Government and County Finances and on Mining and Minerals. He supported making railway companies liable for livestock their trains strike. He also supported ending segregation on train cars, and abolishing convict leasing and replacing it with prison farms.

Asberry lost the 1890 election, and unsuccessfully ran in 1896, losing the latter by 21 votes. He was allegedly shot by judge O. D. Cannon – who also murdered representative Harriel G. Geiger – after he appeal the election to him. The Texas Legislature voted against his election appeal.

== Personal life and death ==
Asberry was also a Baptist deacon. One source called him a "soft-spoken, modest man". He died at some point between 1896 and 1903, aged between 35 and 42. He died before February 19, 1903 at the latest, for his estate was probated by the Robertson County court that day. According to the Texas State Library and Archives Commission, he died c. 1903, in Robertson County. In 2010, he and 51 other African Americans who served in Texas during the Reconstruction era were memorialized on a monument.

== See also ==
- African American officeholders from the end of the Civil War until before 1900
