= American Exhibition =

Coordinates: 51.489°N 0.198°E

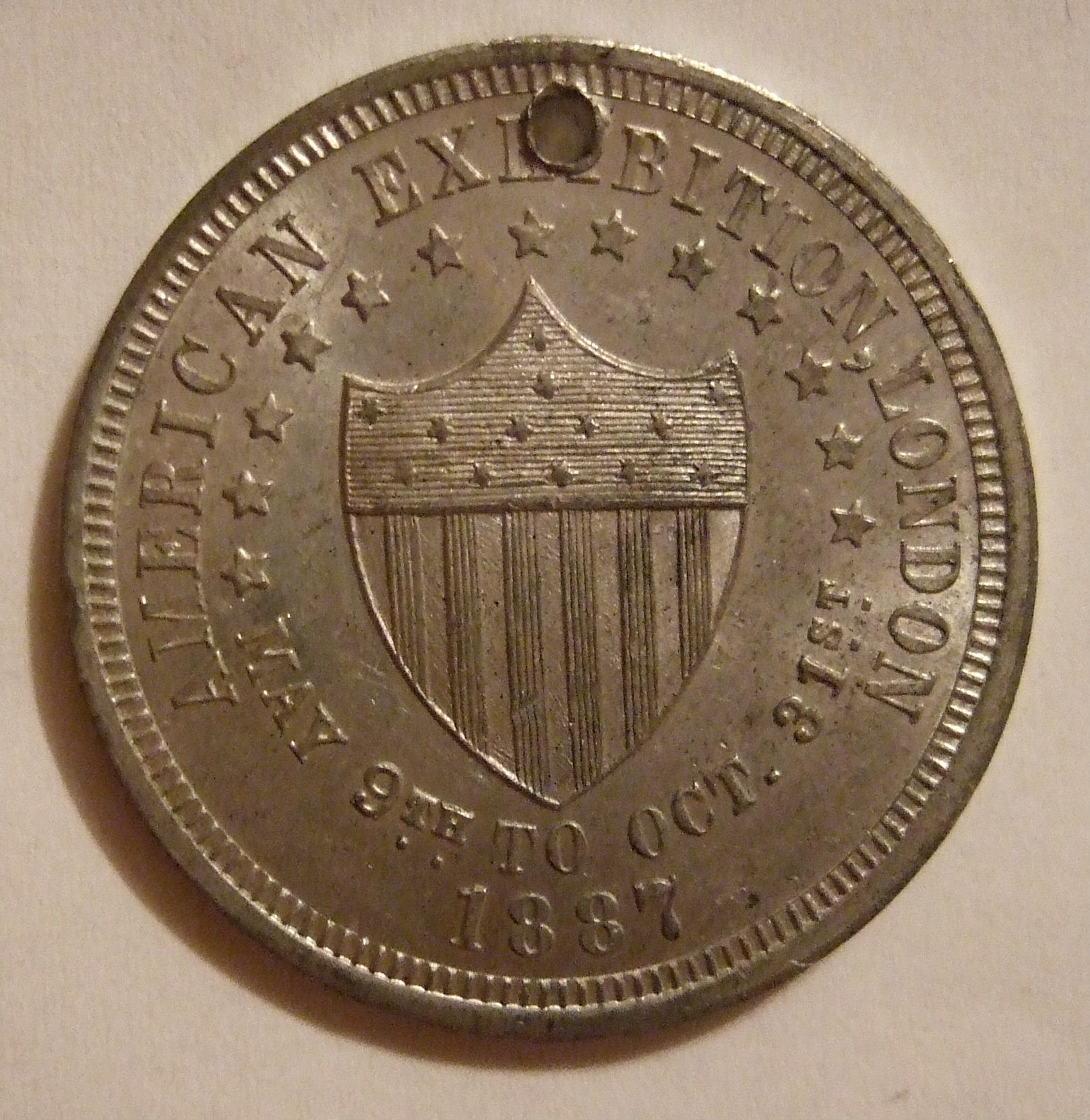
An aluminium token coin from the American Exhibition. At the time, aluminium was complex to produce and more valuable than silver

The American Exhibition was a world's fair held at Earls Court in West Brompton, London, in 1887, the year of Queen Victoria's golden jubilee.

Support for an exhibition had been sought in 1886, but with a loss of support and the British government insisting that an American exhibition not compete with the Colonial and Indian Exhibition, the American Exhibition was deferred to 1887.

The American aim of participating was to display the latest agricultural, mechanical and textile products and inventions from the United States, but the main attraction was the Wild West show featuring Buffalo Bill, part of Colorado's contribution.

Other exhibitions included a showing of Albert Bierstadt's painting of the Bahama Islands: A Nor'wester in the Bahama Island.

== The Wild West show ==
The 1887 American Exhibition was the first time that William Cody's Wild West show came to London.

The show itself was based on a spectacle, "The Drama of Civilization," created by Steele MacKaye, Matt Morgan, and Nelse Waldron for the earlier American version of the Wild West show. The spectacle was a series of tableau vivants grouped into 4 "epochs": "The Primeval Forest," "The Prairie," "Cattle Ranch," and "Mining Camp." Act I, "The Primeval Forest," ended with a fight among the Indians, and it was followed by an interlude featuring dancing by indigenous people and a demonstration of Lillian Smith's sharp-shooting. Act II, "The Prairie," "included a buffalo hunt by the Indians," the passage of a train through "hostile land," a prairie fire, and a stampede, followed by cowboy "riding, roping, and 'bronc busting.'" "The Attack on the Mining Camp," Act or Epoch III, starred Cody defending a cabin against "gunfire and screaming Indians," followed by Cody's and Annie Oakley's shooting. The last epoch, "Mining Camp," featured the Pony Express, an attack on a Deadwood stagecoach, and a cyclone. Ultimately, a 5th epoch was added, "Custer's Last Stand," at the end of which Cody entered and circled the arena on a horse, while "Too Late!" was projected onto the cyclorama. (Although the conclusion to "The Drama of Civilization" might suggest that Cody took part in the Battle of the Little Bighorn, he was not near enough to have arrived at the site of the battle immediately after it was over; furthermore, it is not likely that his presence would have altered the outcome of the battle.)

Transporting Buffalo Bill's Wild West from New York to the UK represented an enormous undertaking, bringing to London a large number of people and animals. Performers included Oakley, 97 indigenous people, mostly people from the Sioux tribes, including Black Elk and Chief Red Shirt, as well as African-American and Mexican or Mexican-American people. The Wild West brought into the UK a large number of animals — "180 horses, 18 buffalo, 10 elk, 5 Texan steers, 4 donkeys, and 2 deer" as well as 10 mules — with customs officials suspending normal quarantine requirements in spite of a local outbreak of hoof-and-mouth disease. Also on board the ship bringing the performers and animals was a real Deadwood stagecoach.

Cody invited the Prince of Wales, later King Edward VII, to a private preview of the Wild West performance on May 5, and the Prince of Wales was impressed enough to arrange a command performance for Queen Victoria on May 11, 1887. The Queen enjoyed the show and recorded in her journal meeting Cody, Annie Oakley, Lillian Smith, Chief Red Shirt, and a number of indigenous American women and children. Black Elk recalled Queen Victoria speaking respectfully to the indigenous performers and their families later in his Black Elk Speaks, but Victoria describes them in their roles in "The Drama of Civilization" as "rather alarming looking, [with] cruel faces." Among the dancers and a young teenager at the time, Black Elk says of Victoria that she "was little but fat and we liked her, because she was good to us." To Queen Victoria the War Dance they danced, "to a wild drum & pipe, was quite fearful, with all their contortions & shrieks, & they came so close."

The success of this command performance for the Queen — her first appearance at a public performance since Prince Consort Albert died in 1861 — set the stage for another command performance on June 20, 1887, for her Golden Jubilee guests. While Victoria herself did not attend this performance, royalty from all over Europe attended, including the future Kaiser Wilhelm II and future King George V. Queen Victoria made one more visit to the Exhibition, on June 22, 1887, although, surprisingly, she does not refer to it in her journal for that date. However, she does mention seeing his show again at Windsor in 1892. These royal encounters provided Buffalo Bill's Wild West an endorsement and publicity that ensured its success.

Buffalo Bill's Wild West closed its London run in October 1887 after over 300 performances and more than two and a half million tickets sold.

== See also ==
- Anglo-American Exhibition
