= Julia Ringwood Coston =

Afro-American publisher and magazine editor

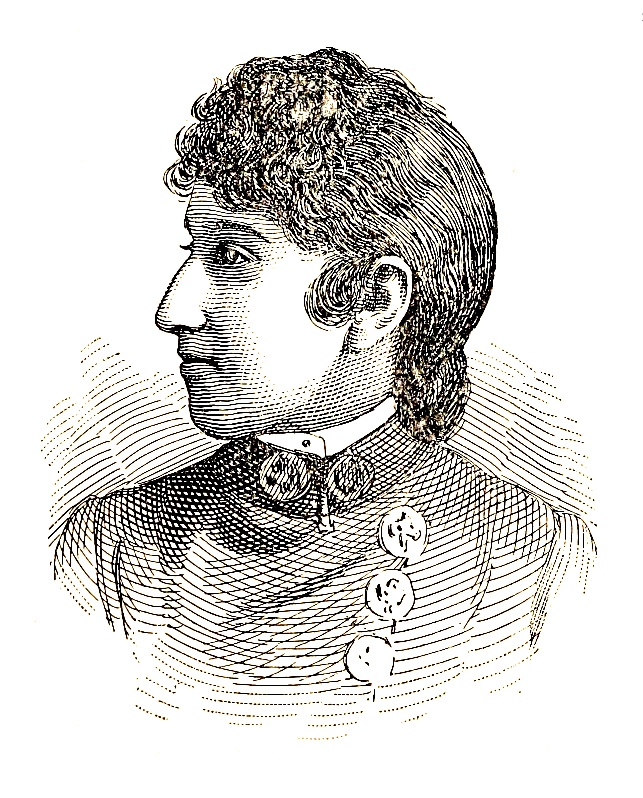
- 1863
- Born: Warrenton, Virginia
- Died: June 1, 1931 (aged 67–68); Washington, District of Columbia
- Occupation: Magazine Editor
- Spouse: William Hilary Coston
- Writing career
- Genre: Biography
- Notable work: Ringwood's Afro-American Journal of Fashion

Julia Ringwood Coston (c. 1863 – June 1, 1931) was a 19th-century African American publisher and magazine editor. In 1891, she founded Ringwood's Afro-American Journal of Fashion, the first illustrated paper for black women.

== Early years and education ==
Coston was born on the Ringwood Farm in the town of Warrenton, Virginia. She was given the name "Ringwood" because of a promise her father made to her mother; if their first-born were a girl, she would be named after the farm. She was brought to live in Washington, D.C. as an infant. Until her mother's failing health caused her to leave school and serve as the family breadwinner, Coston attended public schools until the age of thirteen.

== Career ==
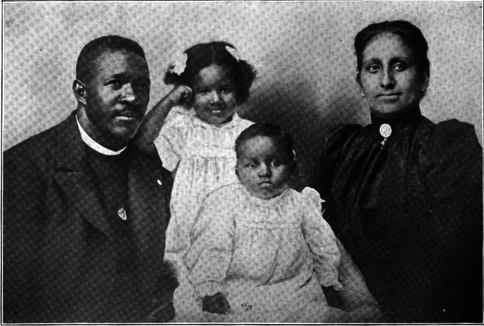
William Hilary Coston (left), Julia Ringwood Coston (right), and their children

Accepting the position as governess in the family of a general of the United States Army, she found time and received both assistance and encouragement to continue her studies. In the spring of 1886, she married Rev. William Hilary Coston, B. D., then a student at Yale University, the Right Rev. J. M. Brown officiating. The couple had two children, the older, a girl named Julia R., and the younger, a boy named, W. H. Coston. Mr. Coston was the author of "A Freeman and Yet a Slave."

As a girl, Coston reportedly longed to see a images and stories of people of color in magazines, leading her to establish Ringwood's Journal. The initial editorial of the journal stated: "Ringwood's Journal of Fashion, published by Mrs. J. R. Coston, makes its advent to satisfy the common desire among us for an illustrated journal of our own ladies. The injury of the absence of the cultivating influence which attaches to a purely published, illustrated journal devoted to the loving interests of our homes, and to the weal of our daughters, was felt by me when a girl, and is recognized by me now when a woman. Knowing that this injury of absence could only be overcome by the presence of such a journal, without measuring the intellectual ability required, we have published Ringwood's Journal."
