= Tupper Memorial Baptist Church =

Baptist church in Raleigh, North Carolina

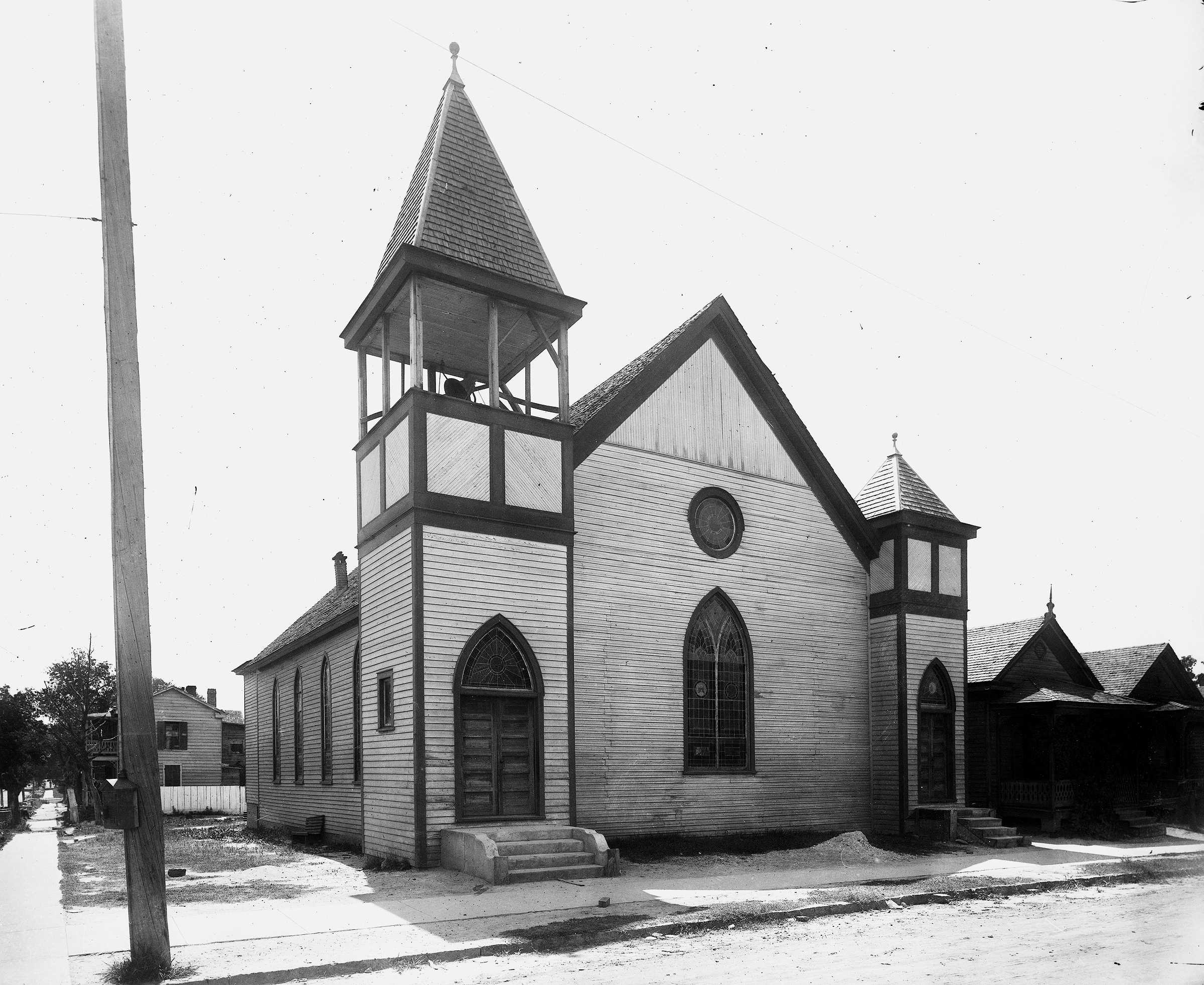
- Tupper Memorial Baptist Church
- 35°46′26″N 78°38′12″W
- Address: 501 S Blount Street; Raleigh, North Carolina
- Country: United States
- Denomination: Baptist
- Website: tuppermbc.org

History
- Status: Church
- Founded: February 17, 1866
- Dedication: Henry Martin Tupper

Architecture
- Architectural type: Church
- Style: Gothic Revival
- Years built: 1912

Tupper Memorial Baptist Church, formerly known as Second Baptist Church, is a historic African-American Baptist church in Raleigh, North Carolina.

== History ==
In 1866, Dr. Henry Martin Tupper established the church as Second Baptist Church, serving Raleigh's African-American community. The church offered Christian education for adults, teenagers, and children as well as theology lessons for preachers. The church's Christian education eventually formed into Shaw University.

In 1912, a new Gothic Revival church was built. In 1940, the church was renamed Tupper Memorial, in honor of Dr. Tupper. In 1957, a brick veneer was added to the church and new windows and buttresses were added as well. More renovations were made in 1976.

In 1990, the United States Department of the Interior designated the church as a historic property and added it to the National Register of Historic Places as a contributing property to the East Raleigh-South Park Historic District.
