= Alice E. McEwen =

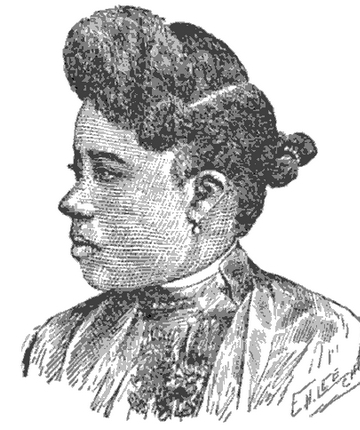
- Born: July 29, 1870; Nashville, TN
- Died: Unknown
- Education: Spelman Seminary, 1888
- Occupations: journalist, newspaper editor, teacher

Alice Elizabeth McEwen (born July 29, 1870) was an African-American journalist, newspaper editor, and teacher. She was one of the twenty-three black women working as journalists in the United States prior to 1891.

== Early life and education ==
Alice Elizabeth McEwen was born to the Reverend Anderson N. and Elizabeth McEwen on July 29, 1870, in Nashville, TN. She attended public schools in the city, and then went to Fisk University in 1881 and Roger Williams University in 1884. In 1885, her father sent her to Spelman Seminary. In 1885, McEwen published her first article, "The Progress of the Negro", in the Montgomery Herald. She continued writing for the Herald, The Spelman Messenger, and other newspapers until she graduated from Spelman on May 24, 1888. Her valedictorian address, titled "The Advantage of Adversity", was published in several southern newspapers.

== Career ==
=== Journalism ===
After graduating, McEwen's father hired her as the assistant editor of The Baptist Leader, of which he was the editor.

McEwen continued to publish. She read her paper "Women in Journalism" before the National Press Association in Washington, D.C., and another paper at the Women's Baptist State Convention in Greenville, AL, both around 1890. "Signs of the Times" appeared in The Freeman in 1891 and was reprinted in The Southern Watchman of Mobile, AL.

=== Education work ===
In addition to writing and editing, McEwen worked as a teacher in Montgomery, Huntsville, and Talladega, AL. In September 1892, she was elected and served as the secretary of the Huntsville Normal School. She then worked as the principal of a school run by the Odd Fellows in Moss Point, MS.
