= Lucretia Newman Coleman =

Canadian-born African-American writer (1856–1948)

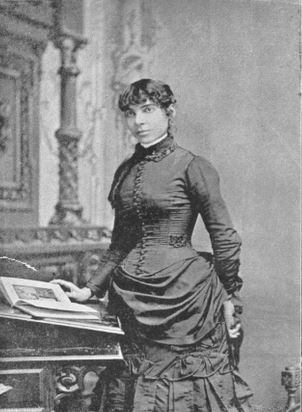
- 1890
- Born: Lucretia Howe Newman; 1856; Dresden, Canada West
- Died: July 31, 1948 (aged 91–92); Grand Rapids, Michigan, US
- Occupations: Writer, journalist
- Years active: 1883–1894
- Spouse: Robert J. Coleman
- Father: William P. Newman

Lucretia Newman Coleman (1856 – July 31, 1948) was an African-American writer born in British North America to a fugitive slave. Fluent at the end of the nineteenth-century, her works were praised by her contemporaries of the African-American press.

== Early life ==
Lucretia Howe Newman was born around 1854 in Dresden, Canada West to Nancy D. (née Brown) and William P. Newman. Her father was a runaway slave from Virginia, who was ordained as a Baptist minister after attending Oberlin College in 1842 and 1843. He pastored for a few years at the Union Baptist Church of Cincinnati, making numerous mission trips to Canada. After the Fugitive Slave Act of 1850 passed, he settled his family in Ontario, where they remained until 1859. He himself involved in the press, publishing multiple times in The North Star and serving as editor of The Provincial Freeman. At that time, the family of six went to Haiti to investigate the possibility of settling there, but the prevalence of Catholicism made him turn his sights to Jamaica. In 1863, he determined to return to the United States and settled again in Cincinnati, resuming his pastorate at Union Baptist. He died in 1866 during a cholera epidemic.

Some accounts state that Newman's mother died after the family moved to Appleton, Wisconsin, and a 13-month illness ensued. Others state that when the family moved to Appleton in 1867 following Rev. Newman's death, the family matriarch was Newman's step-mother, Sarah Cleggett Newman. (Note: The 1851 Canadian Census of Chatham, Kent County, Canada West enumerated a W. P. and a Nancy D. Newman. On 15 August 1859 in Kent, Ontario, Canada, William P. Newman of Williamsburg, Virginia married Sarah Clegget of Pennsylvania.) The family lived a block away from the Cleggett family home in Appleton. As the eldest daughter, Lucretia would have helped take care of her younger siblings and half-siblings. In 1872, Newman enrolled in Lawrence University to study sciences, as one of the first black students at the university. Some of her biographers have said that Newman graduated from Lawrence, but university archives show she was only there for two years and did not earn a degree. The family left Appleton in 1876.

== Career ==
After her studies, Newman became a music teacher and worked in a dry goods store, later working as a teacher's assistant in Appleton. In 1880, she worked as a teacher in Frankfort, Kentucky before being hired as a secretary and book keeper for the African Methodist Episcopal Church in 1883 under Benjamin W. Arnett. That year, she published "Lucille of Montana" in Our Women and Children to acclaim. In 1884, her poem, "Apostraphe to Wendell Phillips," appeared in The Christian Recorder, though she may have been published in the American Baptist prior to that.

In 1884, Newman married Robert J. Coleman in Des Moines, Iowa. In the announcement of her wedding, she was referred to as “one of the most accomplished ladies of Nashville, Tennessee, where she taught a school successfully for many terms.” They briefly relocated to Miles City, Montana, where Robert ran a barbershop, before settling in Minneapolis, Minnesota. They were very involved in public life in Minneapolis. Lucretia was very involved in local clubs, creating a literary society serving on the board and as a member of many local clubs. Her public service was honored by local youth in a 1889 testimonial dinner. Their daughter, Alberta Roberta was born in 1886 while they lived in Minnesota. Coleman's home included her brother Albert Newman. Through the 1880s and 1890s, she published in such volumes as the A.M.E. Church Review and the American Baptist and her works were widely praised in black journals for the scientific and philosophical depth of the writing. Her novel, Poor Ben: A Story of Real Life (1890), a novelization of Arnett's life, was critically acclaimed by her contemporaries. In 1891, her poem "Lucille of Montana", was serialized in American Baptist. In 1892 she was appointed to the board of the Educators of Colored Youth, and in 1894, she served as a vice president of the Colored Authors' Association.

Throughout this time, the Coleman was the victim of regular domestic violence. Finally, in 1901, Robert attempted to choke her and ultimately violently drove his wife and daughter out of their house, denying them access to her possessions. In response, Coleman filed a complaint against Robert demanding her belongings, financial support, and a divorce. She was taken in by sympathetic neighbors, and moved to Chicago after the divorce was settled. In 1902, Robert was institutionalized, and so was unable to provide spousal support. In Chicago, she may have written for a newspaper founded by her brother William, the National Examiner. At some point, she began working as secretary for evangelist Amanda Smith, until the Amanda Smith Orphanage and Industrial Home for Abandoned and Destitute Colored Children was closed in 1906 by the state.

She attempted to run various businesses over the next several years, including taking in children, real estate, and working as a seamstress. She was briefly married to a local contractor, Archibald Goode, though the details of their marriage are unknown. While she did not publish in this time formally, it is possible she ghostwrote or prepared documents.

She moved to Grand Rapids, Michigan to live with her daughter and son-in-law, where she died in 1948. She is interred at the Woodlawn Cemetery.

== Selected works ==
- Coleman, Lucretia H. Newman (1890). Poor Ben: A Story of Real Life. Nashville, Tennessee: Publishing House of the A.M.E. Sunday-School Union. p. 8. OCLC 919955215.
