= Elizabeth Stumm =

American teacher, journalist (1857–1910)

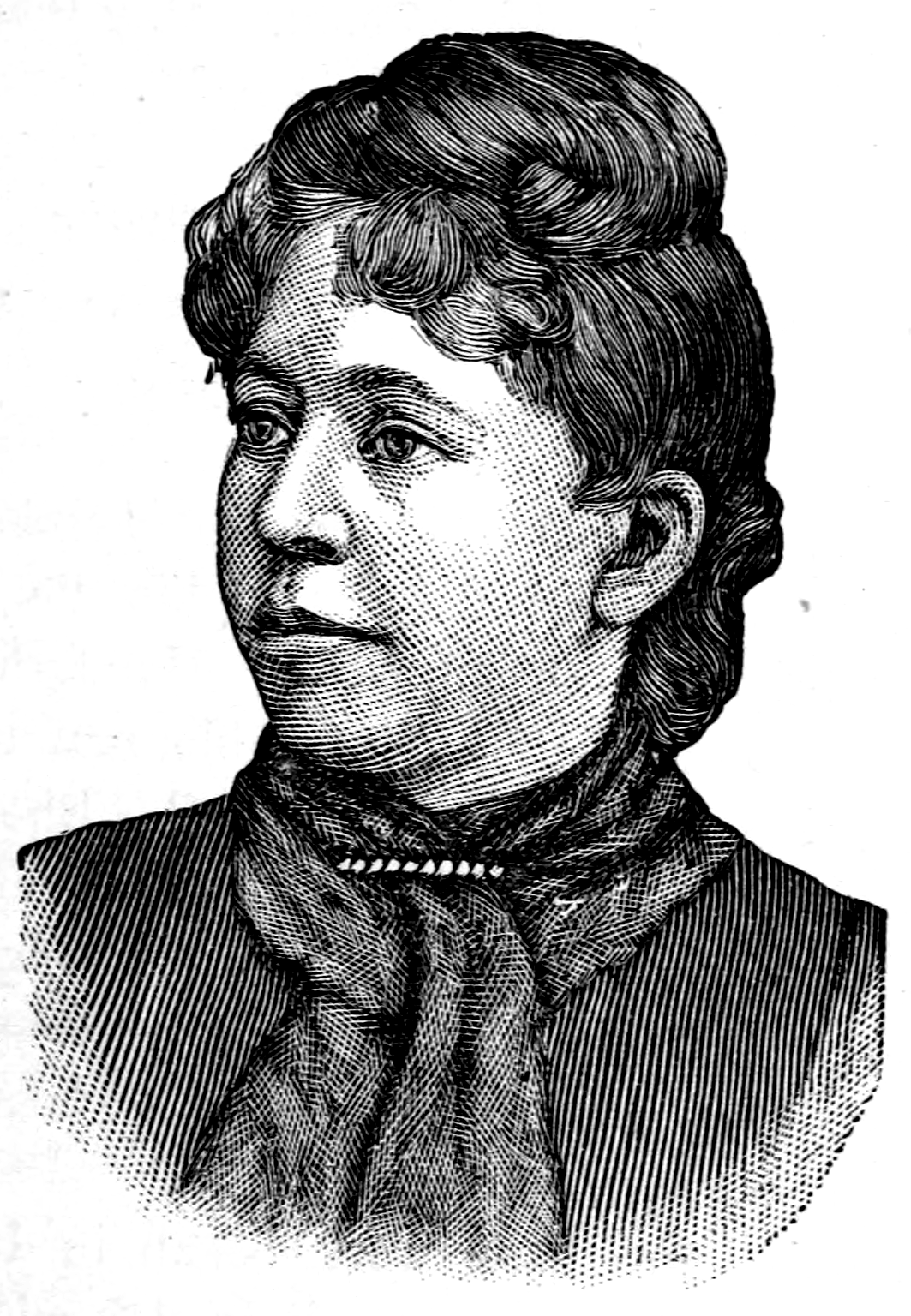
- ca. 1891
- Born: T. Elizabeth Penman; March 25, 1857; Boyle County, Kentucky, U.S.
- Died: May 19, 1910 (aged 53); Philadelphia, Pennsylvania, U.S.
- Burial place: Eden Cemetery, Collingdale, Pennsylvania, U.S.
- Other names: Elizabeth Penman, Mrs. C. C. Stumm, Elizabeth Height
- Occupations: Teacher, journalist, hairdresser
- Years active: 1877–1910
- Spouse(s): Chasteen C. Stumm, Richard Height

Elizabeth Stumm, known by her pen name Mrs. C. C. Stumm (née T. Elizabeth Penman; March 25, 1857 – May 19, 1910) was an African-American teacher and journalist. As her first husband was involved in missionary service, the couple moved often, but Stumm was able to work as a writer and teacher. She wrote for many newspapers and journals in the black press and was noted by numerous compilers of her day as an influential and effective journalist.

== Early life ==
T. Elizabeth Penman was born on March 25, 1857, in Boyle County, Kentucky to Eliza and Thomas Penman. Her father died in her youth and her mother ensured that she obtained an education. Penman attended two terms at Berea College, before beginning a career as a journalist. In 1875, Penman married Rev. Chasteen C. Stumm, a fellow student from Berea. Soon after their marriage, Rev. Stumm was called to missionary work and spent two years at his first station before being transferred to Elizabethtown in Hardin County, Kentucky.

== Career ==
In 1877, Stumm began teaching at a school in Elizabethtown with her husband, where she remained for two years. Shortly before the couple moved in 1879 to Frankfort, Stumm published her first journalistic effort, a discussion over a religious topic printed in the local paper. In conformity with a social norm of the time, Stumm published all of her works using her husband's name, Mrs. C. C. Stumm. In 1881, the Stumms moved again, when Rev. Stumm was appointed to pastor in Bowling Green, Kentucky, and serve as president of the Bowling Green Academy, with Stumm serving as his assistant. She taught at the academy and contributed articles to the Bowling Green Watchman until they relocated to Nashville in 1883, where Rev. Stumm attended the Baptist Theological Institute. After leaving Bowling Green, Stumm served as the matron and taught at Hearne Academy, a school founded in 1881 by the Baptist Lincoln Association, for black education near Hearne, Texas.

The couple then moved to Boston, where Rev. Stumm served as pastor at the Ebenezer Baptist Church and Stumm worked as a contributor to and agent for The Boston Hub and The Boston Advocate, as well as other newspapers and journals of the black press. In 1885, Rev. Stumm was transferred again and they moved to Philadelphia, where he led the Union Baptist Church. Stumm began working for the Brooklyn-based National Monitor, as their Philadelphia business manager and correspondent, and with a similar arrangement for Our Women and Children, a magazine published in Louisville, Kentucky. In 1890, the Stumms began publishing The Christian Banner, a religious journal, for which Stumm acted as the business manager and her husband served as editor.

In 1891, the couple moved to Staunton, Virginia, where Rev. Stumm took over the Mount Zion Baptist Church, which would later be the first church pastored by Theodore Judson Jemison. Stumm continued her writing and was publishing a syndicated column, "Women's Influence", which was featured in The Future State, a magazine from Kansas. Soon after celebrating their twentieth wedding anniversary in 1895, Rev. Stumm died.

After her husband's death, Stumm returned to Philadelphia and finding herself in financial straits without her husband's income, she opened a business to culture hair. She employed four to five women who grew hair for her clients. She had remarried Richard Height in 1908, and used his surname towards the end of her life.

She died on May 19, 1910, in Philadelphia, and was buried at Eden Cemetery in Collingdale, Pennsylvania.
