= Katherine D. Tillman =

American writer (1870–1923)

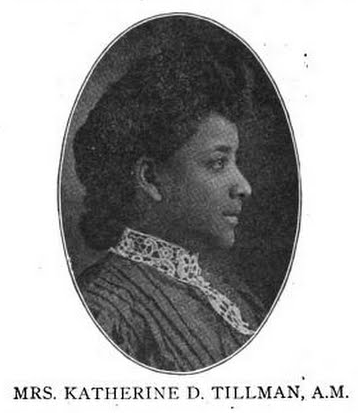
- Katherine Davis Tillman, in a 1916 publication
- Born: Katherine Davis Chapman; February 19, 1870; Mound City, Illinois
- Died: November 29, 1923 (aged 53)
- Occupations: Writer, Missionary
- Spouse: George M. Tillman

Katherine Davis Chapman Tillman (February 19, 1870 – November 29, 1923) was an American writer.

== Early life ==
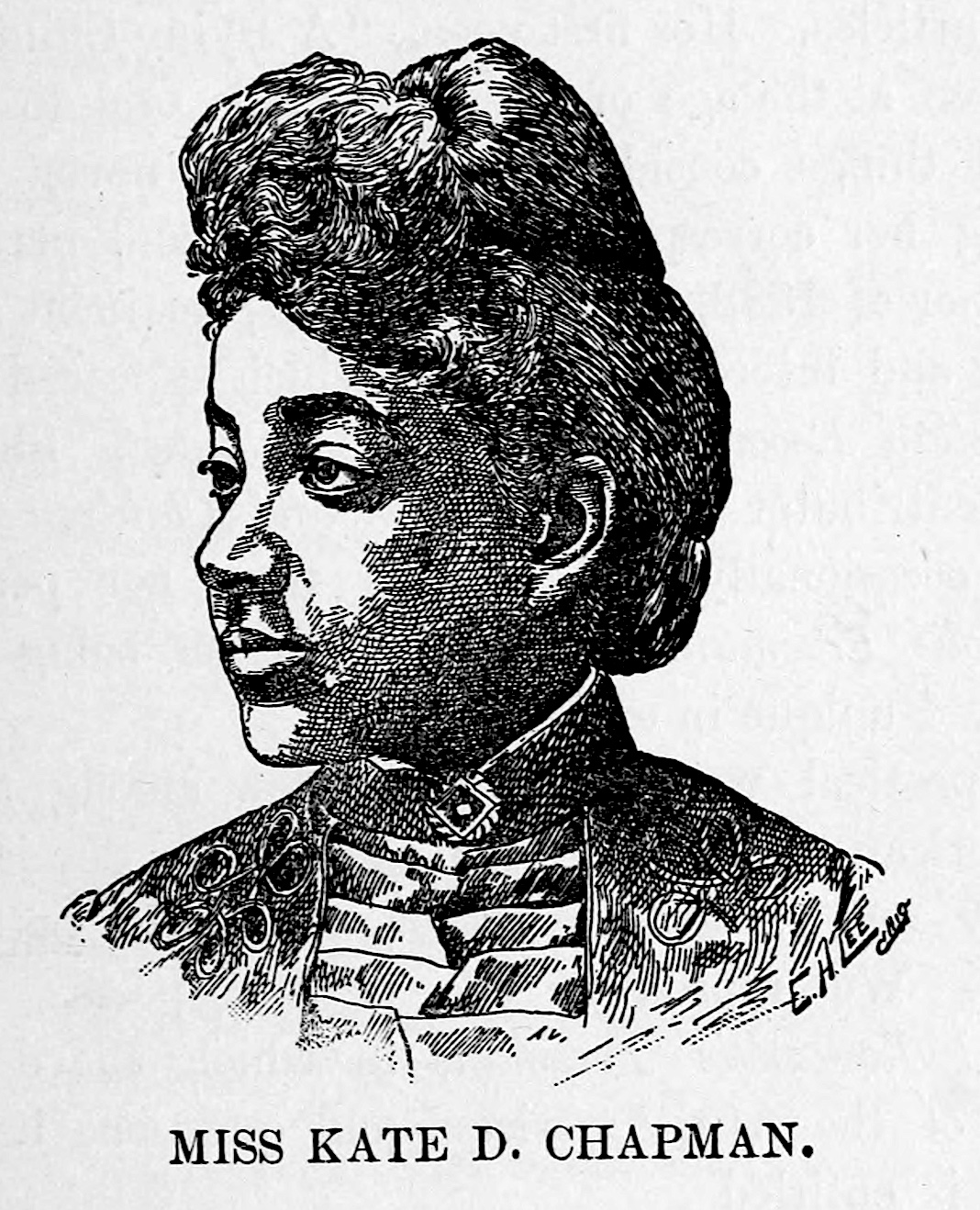
Tillman in 1891

Katherine Davis Chapman was born in Mound City, Illinois, the daughter of Laura and Charles Chapman. Her mother was a teacher. She did not attend school until moving to Yankton, South Dakota, at about the age of twelve; her father raised hunting dogs in Yankton. She attended the State University of Kentucky (later called Simmons College of Kentucky) and Wilberforce University.

== Career ==
In high school, Chapman began to write poetry and to correspond with periodicals and newspapers. Her first poem, "Memory", appeared in print in 1888, in The Christian Recorder. That year she published a series of articles in The Christian Recorder and American Baptist which brought her some fame. She was also a contributor to the magazine, Our Women and Children and to the Indianapolis Freeman. She would also write short stories, poetry, essays, and plays, and frequently contributed to religious magazines such as the nationally distributed A. M. E. Church Review. Fiction by Tillman included the novellas Beryl Weston's Ambition: The Story of an Afro-American Girl's Life (1893) and Clancy Street (serialized, 1898–1899). She wrote historical plays, Thirty Years of Freedom (1902) and Fifty Years of Freedom (1910). Her book of poetry, Recitations, was published in 1902. Her themes are often uplifting messages, especially addressed at young black women, as in this exhortation from "Afro-American Women and their Work" (1895):

We have been charged with mental inferiority; now, if we can prove that with cultivated hearts and brains, we can accomplish the same that is accomplished by our fairer sisters of the Caucasian race, why then, we have refuted the falsehood.

As a pastor's wife, she lived in various states, taught and lectured, and worked with church women's groups and missionary organizations. She was an officer of the National Association of Colored Women's Clubs in the 1910s. During World War I, Katherine D. Tillman was appointed director of publicity for the National Association of Negro Women's Clubs, to highlight war work done by African-American women, with the Red Cross or in other capacities.

== Personal life ==
Kate Chapman married the Rev. George M. Tillman in 1894. They had a daughter, Dorothy. Tillman fell ill and was hospitalized while attending the Eighth Quadrennial Convention of the Women's Parent Mite Missionary Society of the African Methodist Episcopal Church, which was held in Brooklyn on October 3–8, 1923. She died on Thanksgiving Day (November 29) in 1923.

In the 1960s and 1970s there was a Katherine D. Tillman Missionary Society at Bethel A. M. E. Church in Leavenworth, Kansas, named in her memory.
