= Mary Virginia Cook Parrish =

African American activist (1862–1945)

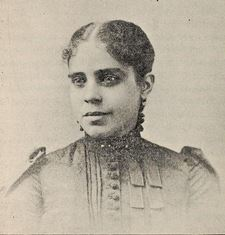
- circa 1893
- Born: Mary Virginia Cook; August 8, 1862; Bowling Green, Kentucky
- Died: October 11, 1945 (aged 83); Louisville, Kentucky, U.S.
- Occupations: Leader in Black Baptist Women's Conventions, clubwoman, educator, journalist, civil rights activist
- Political party: Republican
- Spouse(s): Rev. Dr. Charles Henry Parrish, Sr.
- Children: 2, including Charles Henry Parrish Jr.

Mary Virginia Cook Parrish (August 8, 1862 – October 11, 1945) taught, wrote and spoke on many issues such as women's suffrage, equal rights in the areas of employment and education, social and political reform, and the importance of religion and a Christian education. She was at the founding session of the National Association of Colored Women in 1896 at the 19th Street Baptist Church in Washington D.C. She was an early proponent of Black Baptist feminism and founder of the National Baptist Women's Convention in 1900.

== Background and education ==
Mary Virginia Cook Parrish grew up in Bowling Green, Kentucky. Because of her location and her race, she was given very few academic opportunities. However, she was persistent and was finally given the opportunity to attend some of the black schools in the area. As she progressed throughout school she showed that she had excellent academic ability and soon became known as the best intellectual in the city. In 1891, she was awarded a book prize for being the top reader and a silver cup for being crowned the winner at a tri-school spelling bee. As she began to win these titles, more people in the surrounding areas took notice of her academic excellence.

Soon after receiving these awards, Dr. William J. Simmons, President of State University (later Simmons College of Kentucky), along with a group of women from the American Baptist Woman's Hope Society offered to pay for her to attend the university. Upon entering the university, Parrish studied in the normal department as well as teaching classes. Parrish graduated at the top of her class, with an A.B. degree from the normal school, and continued on to become a professor and Principal of the normal school department at Simmons University. In this role, she traveled extensively to raise funds for Simmons University, lecturing on the importance of a Christian education.

== Speaker ==
Parrish came from a background where gaining an education was a privilege. Her missionary work with women from the white Baptist church expanded her connections with other organizations. Parrish spoke at a number of Baptist Conventions on the importance of an equal education for all, women's rights and social reform. In 1893, she had been elected as the Recording Secretary of the National Baptist Educational Convention.

== Work as a journalist ==
As a natural progression, Parrish moved from speaking to writing and was able to get her ideas and words out to many more people. Just as she spoke on many of the important issues of the times, she wrote about gaining a better education system for females and African Americans, public reform, the significance of receiving a Christian education, and equality in all areas of society. She wrote for a variety of different newspapers and magazines including columns for The South Carolina Tribune and American Baptist. She became the editor of the Educational Department for the African American Baptist magazine, Our Women and Children. She also wrote articles for Hope, a missionary magazine that provided important communication to black women activists who attended the Black Baptist women's state conventions.

In an edition of the woman's column in the journal American Baptist, she wrote:

White faces seem to think it their heaven-born right to practice civil war on negroes, to the extent of blood-shed and death. They look upon the life of their brother in black as a bubble to be blown away at their pleasure. The same spirit that existed in the South twenty-four years ago, is still recognized in its posterity. The negro is still clothed in swarthy skin, and he is still robbed of his rights as a citizen, made clear and fairly won to him by the death of those who fell in the late Rebellion. The outrage cannot endure.

While working at these publications, she fought her own battles. Oftentimes she would have to argue with the male editors of the papers to even get her ideas printed and wrote under the pen name of Grace Ermine. She didn't give up though and soon rose to positions of leadership despite the traditional reliance on males to set policy and exercise power in religious leadership roles. She worked diligently to have her ideas published so that the community could know what a great problem was facing society and so that more people would join her cause and work for a better tomorrow.

== Marriage and life as a pastor's wife ==
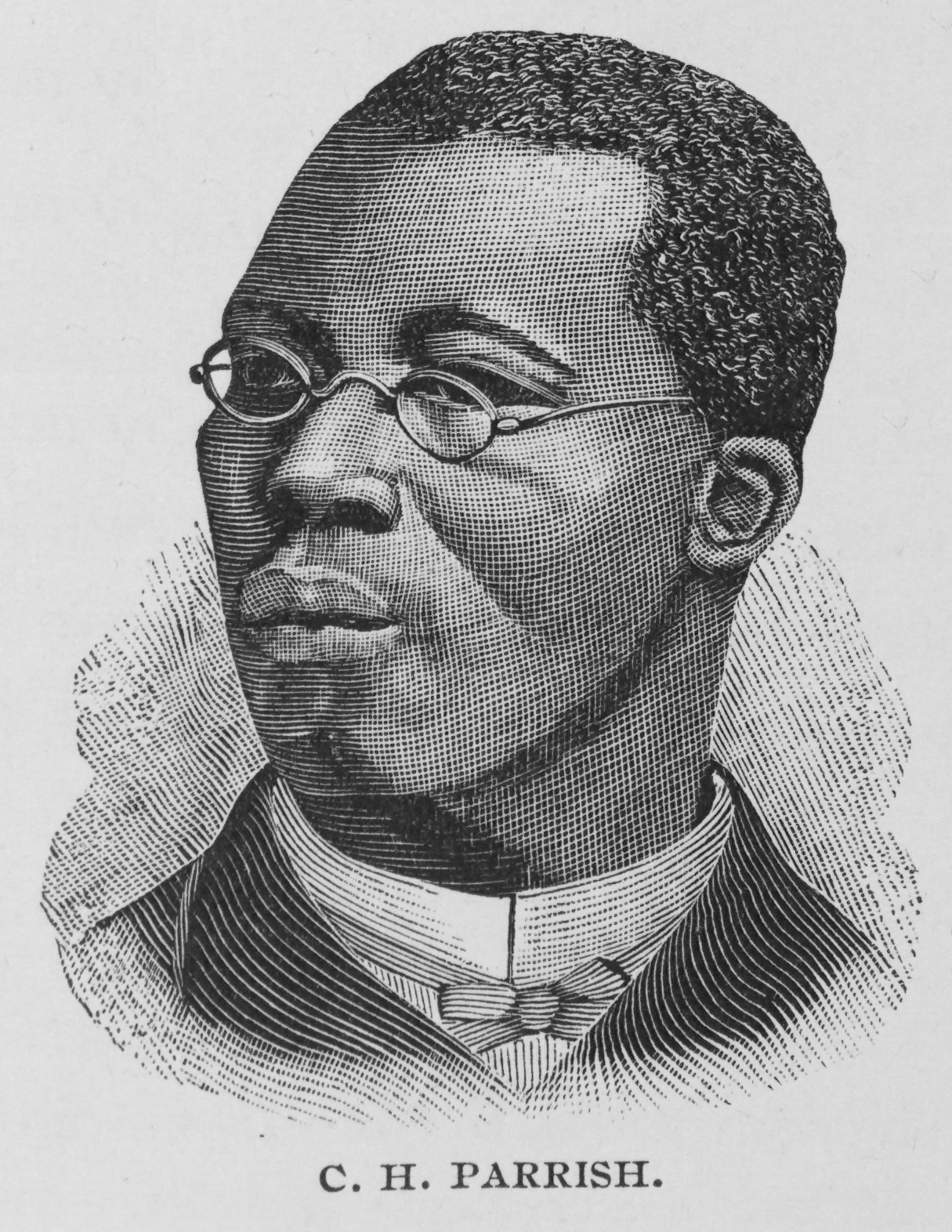
Parrish married Rev. Charles H. Parrish in 1898

On January 26, 1898, after working for a short time as a secretary for the Eckstein Norton Institute in Cane Spring, Kentucky, she married Charles Henry Parrish. Parrish at that time was president of Eckstein Norton Institute, pastor of Louisville's Calvary Baptist Church, and president of the Executive Board of the General Association of Negro Baptists in Kentucky. She moved back to Louisville to work as the financial secretary for her husband's church. The following year, their son, Charles H. Parrish Jr. was born.

Parrish and her husband led the establishment of the Kentucky Home Finding Society for Colored Children in Louisville in 1908, and she served on the board until it was closed in 1937. Under her leadership in the women's auxiliary unit, the National Baptist Convention in 1909 created the National Training School for Women and Girls in Washington D.C. As chair of the Board of Trustees, Parrish was responsible for that school's education of more than 2,000 women in the early 20th century. Parrish led the efforts of the Louisville affiliate of the National Association of Colored Women in addressing education reform, health care and child welfare. She was instrumental in hosting the Thirteenth Annual Convention of the National Association in Louisville in 1910. The black women's clubs in Kentucky became an important leadership avenue for those as ambitious and educated as Parrish.

== Activist ==
In the 1930s when Parrish learned she could not join a Parent Teacher Association in Louisville, Kentucky, she organized her own in the city's black-only school. She refused to accept that black children were without a playground and showed up at the mayor's office to demand one be built. Three weeks later, the children had their playground. When she brought ten little girls with her to the local YWCA, "they called the police and said you may not stay here, these children are not welcome." She then organized a new chapter, called the Phillis Wheatley (West End) YWCA. She also served as the first president of the Colored Republican's Women's Club in Louisville. In 1932 she served as an alternate delegate to the National Republican Convention in Chicago.

== Honors and awards ==
- Silver cup in a spelling bee
- 1881: book prize for being the best reader in front of a crowd
- Albert Mack Valedictorian Medal
- Silver medal in a spelling bee by Dr. D. A. Gaddie
- Silver award for neatness and accuracy in writing given by Mr. William H. Steward
- Student-teacher at Simmons University
- President of Athenaeum at Simmons University
- President of the Young Men's and Women's Christian Association

== Bibliography ==
Speeches

- American Baptist National Convention: "Women's Work in the Denomination"
- American Baptist Home Mission Society: "Female Education"
- National Press Convention: "Is Juvenile literature demanded on the part of colored children?"
- Kentucky State Teachers Association: "Woman, a Potent Factor in Public Reform"

Papers

- Nothing But Leaves

Articles

- "The Work for Baptist Women" (1890)

== See also ==
- African-American women in politics
- National Baptist Convention, USA, Inc.
- List of Kentucky women in the civil rights era
