= Monroe Alpheus Majors =

American physician, writer and civil rights activist (1864–1960)

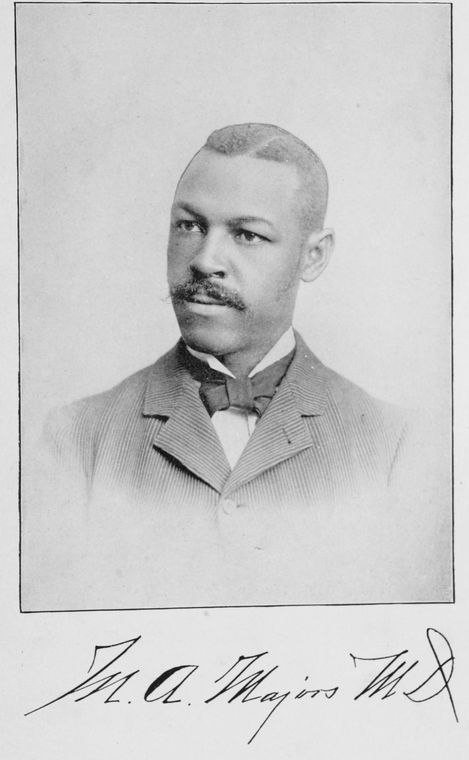
- Majors in 1893
- Born: October 12, 1864; Waco, Texas, U.S.
- Died: December 10, 1960 (aged 96); Los Angeles, California, U.S.
- Education: West Texas College; Tillotson Normal and Collegiate Institute; Central Tennessee College
- Alma mater: Meharry Medical College
- Occupations: physician, journalist, writer

Monroe Alpheus Majors (October 12, 1864 – December 10, 1960) was an American physician, writer and civil rights activist in Texas and Los Angeles. He was one of the first black physicians in the American southwest and established a medical association for black physicians who were not allowed entry into the American Medical Association. He wrote a noted book of biographies of African-American women, Noted Negro Women: Their Triumphs and Activities, published in 1893, and wrote for numerous African-American newspapers, notably the Indianapolis Freeman, of which he was an associate editor in 1898 and 1899, and the Chicago Conservator, which he edited from 1908 to 1910. He was the father of composer Margaret Bonds.

== Early life ==
Monroe Alpheus Majors was born in Waco, Texas, in 1864, the son of Andrew Jackson Majors and Jane Barringer. In 1869, they moved to Austin, Texas, where Majors went to Freedmen's Bureau schools. He attended college at West Texas College, Tillotson Normal and Collegiate Institute, and Central Tennessee College. He then attended Meharry Medical College in Nashville, graduating in 1886.

== Career ==
Majors then moved back to Texas to practice medicine, working in Brenham, Dallas, and Calvert. He was the first African-American doctor in Calvert. In 1886, he established the Lone Star State Medical Association for African-American physicians, as an alternative to the American Medical Association which restricted black membership. In 1888, he moved to Los Angeles, where he lectured at the Los Angeles Medical College. He was the first African American to pass the California Board of Medical Examination.

Majors was also active in civil rights, first in Texas and later in California. He edited the Los Angeles Western News, where he advocated for African-American appointment to civic positions.

In 1889, Majors married Georgia A. Green, who was from Texas, and in 1890 they returned to Waco, where he practiced medicine and taught at Paul Quinn College. He also edited a paper, the Texas Searchlight, raised money for the building of a hospital, and opened the first black-owned drugstore in the American Southwest.

In 1893, Majors published Noted Negro Women. He wrote the book mainly to show the accomplishments of black women, but also to express the "progress" of African Americans since the end of slavery in the 1860s. He also began writing for various national African-American newspapers, particularly the Indianapolis Freeman. In 1898, he moved to Decatur, Illinois. In Illinois, his life was threatened due to his writings against lynching, particularly that which occurred in Decatur shortly before he arrived, and he fled to Indianapolis where he became an associate editor of the Freeman. In 1899, he returned to Waco, but death threats forced him to return to the north, and he moved to Chicago in 1901. He continued practicing medicine, and in Chicago he also wrote for many newspapers, notably The Broad Ax, The Chicago Defender, The Washington Bee, The People’s Advocate, and The Colored American. From 1908 to 1910 he edited The Chicago Conservator.

== Later life and family ==
In 1889, Majors married Georgia A. Green, and they divorced in 1908. In 1909 he married Estelle C. Bonds, and he later married twice more. A daughter of Majors and Estelle was Margaret Allison, who became a noted composer. When Bonds and Majors divorced in 1917, Margaret's mother changed her last name from Majors to Bonds. In the 1920s, Majors began to lose his eyesight and was forced to curtail his work. He largely retired from medicine in 1923. In 1933, he moved back to Los Angeles, where he died aged 96 in 1960.
