= Ione Wood Gibbs =

American journalist

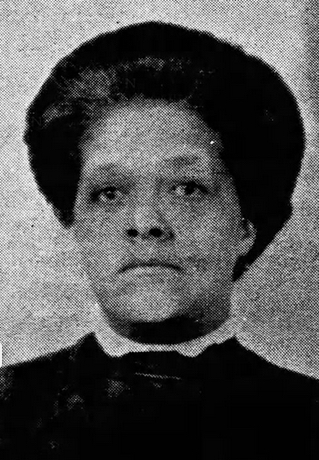
- Ione E. Wood Gibbs, from a 1910 publication
- Born: Ione Elveda Wood c. 1871; Burlington, New Jersey, U.S.
- Died: June 1923; Minneapolis, Minnesota, U.S.
- Other names: Ione E. Wood, Ione E. Gibbs (after marriage)
- Occupations: Journalist, clubwoman
- Years active: 1888–1914

Ione Elveda Wood Gibbs (c. 1871 – June 1923) was an American educator, journalist, and clubwoman. She served as vice-president of the National Association of Colored Women from 1912 to 1914.

== Early life ==
Ione Elveda Wood was born in Burlington, New Jersey, the daughter of George Wood and Emma Simmons Wood. She attended high school in Atlantic City. Her uncle William J. Simmons was the president of Kentucky Normal and Theological Institute, so she attended that school and trained as a teacher, earning her degree in 1888.

== Career ==
Wood was an instructor at the Kentucky Normal and Theological Institute while she was still a teenage student there. She wrote freelance articles, and from 1888 to 1891 was on the editorial staff of Our Women and Children, a Baptist women's magazine run by her uncle. "Miss Ione E. Wood ranks today among the foremost of our women", commented one contemporary writer, "first, from the standpoint of acknowledged intellectual ability to write; second, as an earnest educator and race advocate".

After marriage, Gibbs was active in the Ada Sweet Pioneer Club, a literary and musical club in Minneapolis. In 1905, she served as the first president of the Minnesota State Federation of Afro-American Women's Clubs, after black women's groups were refused membership in the existing Minnesota Federation of Women's Clubs. From 1912 to 1914, she was vice-president of the National Association of Colored Women. She wrote an essay, "Woman's Part in the Uplift of the Negro Race" (1907), which was published nationally, and is still occasionally reprinted.

== Personal life ==
Wood married restaurant owner Jasper Gibbs in 1890. They had five sons: Jasper, Hiram, Morris, Mark, and Wendell. They resided in Minneapolis. Wood died in 1923.
