= Lucy Wilmot Smith =

American teacher, journalist, editor, suffragist, historian

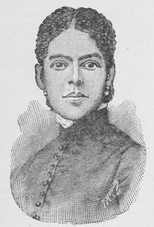
- Born: November 16, 1861; Lexington, Kentucky, U.S.
- Died: December 1, 1889 (aged 28); Lexington, Kentucky, U.S.
- Education: State University
- Occupations: Journalist, Educator

Lucy Wilmot Smith (November 16, 1861 - December 1, 1889) was an American teacher, journalist, editor, suffragist, and historian from the U.S. state of Kentucky. She was one of only a few women to hold an office in the American National Baptist Convention. Her teaching career began in 1877 while her journalism career began in 1884.

== Early years and education ==
Lucy Wilmot Smith was born November 16, 1861, in Lexington, Kentucky, the daughter of Margaret Smith. Though it is unclear if she was born a slave, her household was poor. Smith's education was provided for by her mother.

== Career ==
In 1877, while still young, she took a position under the Lexington School Board. In 1881, she was elected teacher in State University, taking charge of the model school as principal. For some time, she served as private secretary to Dr. William J. Simmons, who helped her career, speaking often about Smith's worth and helpfulness. Though serving as teacher and private secretary, she took up the studies of the normal department and graduated in 1887. She financially supported a sister in the university. After this sister's graduation she assumed the education, in the same school, of a sister's daughter and that of one of her own brothers.

In 1884, Smith left the State University and filled a position in Wyandotte County, Kansas. Here, she became President of the Sewing Circle of the Wyandotte Baptist Church, also of a society connected with the Methodist Church, and Secretary of the Women's Christian Temperance Union. Upon the urgent request of president and trustees, she returned to her old position at State University, September, 1885, where she served as financial clerk and city missionary for the YMCA/YWCA; she also served this body as president. She became a Christian, December, 1872, under the influence of Rev. James Monroe, and joined the Baptist Church.

When the call was made in 1883, by Simmons, for the Baptist women of the State to come together and organize for the benefit of the educational work, Smith became secretary of the organization. She was a member of the Board of Managers for years and was Secretary of Children's Hands, an auxiliary of that body. She wrote a pamphlet of 13 pages, setting forth the work, constitution, order of business and work children could do to earn their own money. The first National Baptist Convention, which met in St. Louis in 1886, listened to a paper from her on "'The Future Colored Girl," which is published in the "Journal" of that meeting. She was also elected at that time as Historian of that body, and served it several years as one of the executive committee. In 1888, she again appeared before this body with a paper.

Smith's newspaper work began in 1884, when she controlled the "Children's Column" in The American Baptist, of Louisville. In 1887, she accepted a position on the staff of The Baptist Journal of which Rev. R. H. Coles, of St. Louis, was editor. She furnished sketches of newspaper writers, among the women of the race, for The New York Journalist, in the interest of artists, authors and publishers, Her work was praised and reproduced in the Boston Advocate (now known as The Jewish Advocate), the Indianapolis Freeman and other papers. She edited the department of "Woman and Woman's Work" in Our Women and Children, a magazine of Louisville.

Smith was greatly interested in the elevation of woman and was always outspoken on woman suffrage. She had begun a book on "Women and Their Achievements," and supported temperance.

In the fall of 1888, overwork began to tell on her features, then a dreaded cough set in. Smith's friends became alarmed from the first and begged her to give up work and take rest. She only smiled at such requests and said, "It will be all right." Everything was done for her, yet she became more sick. Physicians were consulted and assured anxious friends that all would be useless unless she gave up work. Yet she continued to work. Summer came, she went off for vacation, but too late then to do much good. September, 1889, when school opened, she was found at her post of duty, feeble and emaciated. She knew what the result would be and requested Dr. Simmons to preach her funeral, and selected hymns and passages of scripture for the occasion. Her mother came to be with her and if possible have her go home, to Lexington, but she stoutly refused. October 15, 1889, she consented to go home, and was accompanied by Jane McKamey, and Rev. C. H. Parrish. She died December 1, 1889; 1890 is also mentioned.
