= Men of Mark =

1887 anthology of short biographies written by Rev. William J. Simmons

Men of Mark: Eminent, Progressive and Rising
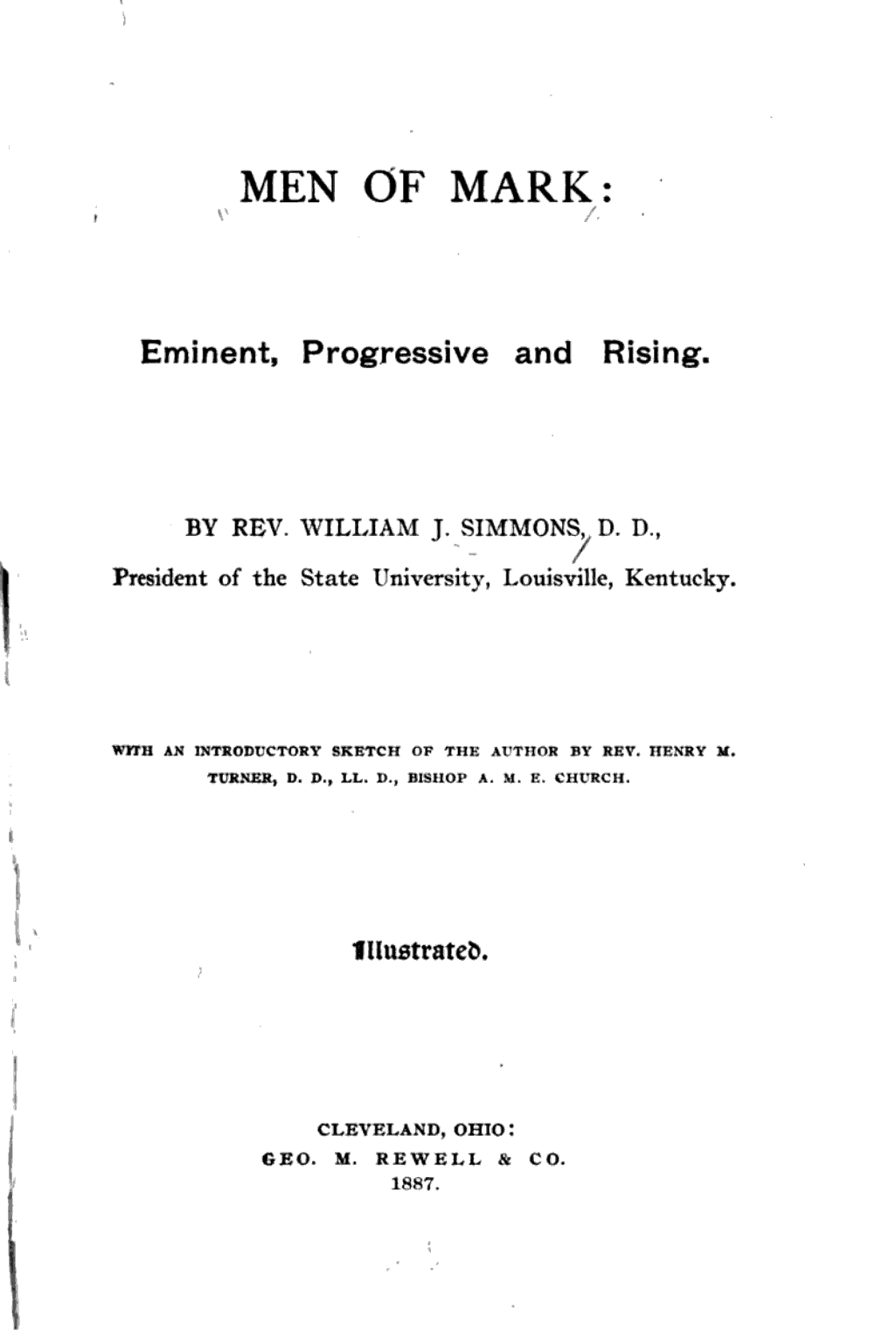
- Author: William J. Simmons
- Language: English
- Genre: Biography anthology
- Publication date: 1887
- Publication place: United States
- ISBN: 9781468096811

Men of Mark: Eminent, Progressive and Rising (1887) is an anthology of 177 short biographies of African-American men written by Rev. William J. Simmons, a Baptist minister and college administrator. The book has been called the "single most authoritative work on nineteenth-century African Americans". Henry McNeal Turner, a noted African Methodist Episcopal minister and leader, wrote the introduction.

== Background ==
When his book was published, Simmons was a Baptist minister who was president of the State University of Kentucky, a historically black college in Louisville, Kentucky. (It was later renamed as Simmons College in his honor.) A leading figure in African-American society, Simmons personally knew many of the subjects of the book.

== Description ==
The author of the biographies was Rev. Dr. William J. Simmons, president of the State University of Kentucky.

Based on primary source material such as "speeches, sermons, and articles", Simmons wrote short biographies of many prominent African-American men and historic figures, such as Crispus Attucks, Frederick Douglass, Henry Highland Garnet, and Alexander Crummell, as well as lesser known ones. The range of occupations include attorneys, carpenters, pastors, merchants, phrenologists, artists, and scholars. Most of these men had parents who had been enslaved or were themselves born into slavery.

Simmons was supportive of black nationalism, such as that espoused by Henry McNeal Turner, an influential African Methodist Episcopal minister who wrote an introduction and biographical sketch of Simmons for this collection. Simmons gained lasting fame from his book. He planned a companion volume about notable African-American women, but died suddenly in 1890.

This book has been called the "single most authoritative work on nineteenth-century African Americans". The entries demonstrate the leading role that religious leaders played in African-American life and identity of the time. Seventy-one of the 177 biographies are of Christian ministers; there were nearly three times as many ministers as men of any other profession. Simmons writes in his preface that these examples were intended to show how people develop themselves, and could be used for students.

Simmons stressed the positive aspects of the lives he examined, which was typical of histories of that period. Baptist scholar William H. Brackney described them as "hagiographic". The book was reprinted in 1968 by Arno Press.

Numerous other biographical anthologies covering African Americans were published around this time, as blacks became educated and worked to establish their place in United States life and history. Among the works were two separate books about women of color published in 1893: Noted Negro Women by Monroe Alpheus Majors and Women of Distinction by Lawson A. Scruggs, both published in 1893.

== Table of contents ==
Table of contents
Chapter	Name	Notes from Book
Chapter I.	Hon. Frederick Douglass, LL. D.	Magnetic Orator—Anti-Slavery Editor—Marshal Of The District Of Columbia—First Citizen Of America—Eminent Patriot And Distinguished Republican
Chapter II.	Rev. W. B. Derrick, D. D.	Minister Of the A. M. E. Church—Pulpit Orator
Chapter III.	Philip H. Murry, Esq.	Phrenologist—Editor—Philosopher
Chapter IV.	Crispus Attucks.	First Martyr Of the Revolutionary War—A Negro Whose Blood Was Given For Liberty—Blood The Price Of Liberty
Chapter V.	Granville T. Woods, Esq.	Electrician—Mechanical Engineer—Manufacturer Of Telephones, Telegraph And Electrical Instruments
Chapter VI.	Hon. Jeremiah A. Brown.	Legislator—Carpenter And Joiner—Clerk—Deputy Sheriff—Turnkey—Letter Carrier
Chapter VII.	William Calvin Chase, Esq.	Editor Of The Washington Bee—A Vigorous And Antagonistic Writer—Politician—Agitator
Chapter VIII.	Rev. James W. Hood, D. D.	Bishop Of The A. M. E. Zion Church—Church Organizer And Builder—Assistant Superintendent Of Public Instruction—His Many Contests For Civil Rights On Steamboats And Cars
Chapter IX.	Hon. Samuel R. Lowery.	Silk Culturist—Lawyer—Editor
Chapter X.	William Still, Esq.	Philanthropist—Coal Dealer—Twenty Years Owner Of The Largest Public Hall Owned By a Colored Man—Author
Chapter XI.	Professor J. W. Morris, A. B., A. M., LL. B.	President Of Allen University, Columbia, S. C.--Professor Of Languages
Chapter XII.	Hon. Robert Smalls.	Congressman—Pilot And Captain Of The Steamer "Planter."
Chapter XIII.	Henry Ossawa Tanner.	A Rising Artist—Exhibitor Of Paintings In The Art Galleries—Illustrator Of Magazines
Chapter XIV.	Rev. Andrew Heath.	A Minister Of The Gospel, Eminent For His Piety
Chapter XV.	H. C. Smith, Esq.	Prominent Editor—First-Class Musician—Deputy Oil Inspector Of Ohio—Song Writer—Leader Of Bands—Cornetist
Chapter XVI.	Rev. John Bunyan Reeve, A. B., D. D.	Distinguished Presbyterian Divine—Professor Of Howard University Theological Department
Chapter XVII.	Thomas J. Bowers, Esq.	The American "Mario"—Tenor Vocalist
Chapter XVIII.	Rev. Nicholas Franklin Roberts, A. B., A. M.	Professor Of Mathematics—President Of The Baptist State Convention Of North Carolina—Moderator Of One Hundred Thousand Baptists
Chapter XIX.	Hon. Theophile T. Allain.	State Senator Of Louisiana—Agitator Of Educational Measures And Internal Improvement—Contractor For Repairing Levees
Chapter XX.	Denmark Veazie.	"Black John Brown"—Martyr
Chapter XXI.	Professor J. E. Jones, A. B., A. M.	Professor Of Homiletics And Greek In The Theological Seminary, Richmond, Va.--Corresponding Secretary Of The Baptist Foreign Mission Convention
Chapter XXII.	John Wesley Terry, Esq.	Foreman Of The Ironing And Fitting Department Of The Chicago West Division Street Car Company—Director And Treasurer Of The Chicago Co-Operative Packing And Provision Company—Director Of The Central Park Building And Loan Association
Chapter XXIII.	William E. Matthews, LL. B.	Broker—Real Estate Agent—Financier And Lawyer
Chapter XXIV.	Rev. James Alfred Dunn Podd.	Superintendent Of Schools—Editor—Brilliant Pastor
Chapter XXV.	Hon. Henry Wilkins Chandler, A. B., A. M.	Member Of The State Senate, Florida—Capitalist—Lawyer—City Clerk And Alderman
Chapter XXVI.	Rev. Theodore Doughty Miller, D. D.	The Eloquent Pastor Of Cherry Street Baptist Church, Philadelphia, Pa.--A Veteran Divine Distinguished For Long Service
Chapter XXVII.	J. D. Baltimore, Esq.	Chief Engineer And Mechanician At The Freedmen's Hospital—Engineer—Machinist—Inventor
Chapter XXVIII.	J. R. Clifford, Esq.	Editor—Lawyer—Teacher—Orator
Chapter XXIX.	Wiley Jones, Esq.	The Owner Of a Street Car Railroad, a Race Track And a Park—A Capitalist Worth $125,000
Chapter XXX.	Professor John H. Burrus, A. B., A. M.	President Of Alcorn University—Professor Of Mental And Moral Philosophy And Constitutional Law—Teacher Of Political Economy, Literature And Chemistry—Attorney At Law
Chapter XXXI.	Henry F. Williams, Esq.	Composer—Violinist And Cornetist—Band Instructor
Chapter XXXII.	Rev. Edmund Kelly.	Christian Letter-Writer—Lecturer And Author
Chapter XXXIII.	Rev. Preston Taylor.	Pastor Of The Church Of The Disciples, Nashville, Tennessee—General Financial Agent Of The College—Big Contractor
Chapter XXXIV.	Solomon G. Brown.	Distinguished Scientist—Lecturer—Chief Clerk Of The Transportation Department Of The Smithsonian Institute [sic], Washington, D. C.--Entomologist—Taxidermist—Lecturer On "Insects" And "Geology."
Chapter XXXV.	John Mitchell, Jr.	The Gamest Negro Editor On The Continent—A Man Of Grit And Iron Nerve—A Natural Born Artist
Chapter XXXVI.	Rev. London Ferrill.	Pastor Of a Church Incorporated By a State Legislature—An Old Time Preacher—Hired By Town Trustees To Preach To Colored People
Chapter XXXVII.	Professor Richard Theodore Greener, A. B., LL. B., LL. D.	Chief Civil Service Examiner—Lawyer—Metaphysician, Logician And Orator—Prize Essayist—Dean Of The Law Department Of Howard University
Chapter XXXVIII.	Captain Paul Cuffee.	Sea Captain—Wealthy Ship Owner—Petitions To The Massachusetts Legislature Against "Taxation Without Representation" Petition Granted
Chapter XXXIX.	Rev. Alexander Walters.	Financier And Pulpit Orator
Chapter XL.	Benjamin Banneker.	Astronomer—Philosopher—Inventor—Philanthropist
Chapter XLI.	Rev. Richard DeBaptiste, D. D.	Corresponding Secretary And Beloved Disciple
Chapter XLII.	Hon. George French Ecton.	Representative From The Third Senatorial District, Chicago—From The Plowhandles To The Legislature—From The Capacity Of a Waiter To That Of Legislator
Chapter XLIII.	Professor Newell Houston Ensley.	Professor Of Rhetoric And Sciences—Hebraist—Musician
Chapter XLIV.	Rev. Christopher H. Payne.	Preacher, Editor And Soliciting Agent
Chapter XLV.	Professor Peter Humphries Clark, A. M.	Educator—Editor And Agitator
Chapter XLVI.	Justin Holland, Esq.	Musical Author And Arranger—Performer On The Guitar, Flute And The Piano Forte
Chapter XLVII.	Professor William Hooper Council.	President State Normal And Industrial School, Huntsville, Alabama—Editor And Lawyer
Chapter XLVIII.	Rev. James Poindexter, D. D.	Advocate Of Human Rights—Minister Of The Gospel And Agitator—Director Of The Bureau Of Forestry—Member Of The Board Of Education Of The City Of Columbus, Ohio
Chapter XLIX.	Richard Mason Hancock, Esq.	Foreman Of The Pattern Shops Of The Eagle Works Manufacturing Company, Chicago, Illinois—Mathematician, Draughtsman. Carpenter—Foreman Of The Liberty Iron Works Pattern Shops.
Chapter L.	Professor W. S. Scarborough, A. B., A. M., LL. D.	Author Of a Greek Text Book—Scientist—Lecturer—Scholar—Student Of Sanscrit, Zend, Gothicand Luthanian Languages
Chapter LI.	Rev. Solomon T. Clanton, JR., A. B., B. D.	Instructor Of Mathematics—Secretary Of The American National Baptist Convention—Agent Of The American Baptist Publication Society
Chapter LII.	Prof. John O. Crosby, A. M., B. E.	Principal State Normal School, North Carolina.
Chapter LIII.	Hon. Francis L. Cardoza.	Secretary Of State—Treasurer Of State—Professor Of Languages—Principal Of The High School, Washington, D. C.
Chapter LIV.	Hon. John S. Leary, LL. B.	Attorney At Law—Legislator—U. S. Deputy Collector.
Chapter LV.	E. S. Porter, A. B., M. D.	Physician On The Sanitary Force Of Louisville, Kentucky—Medical Attendant At The Orphans' Home And The State University—Lecturer.
Chapter LVI.	Rev. Augustus Tolton.	The First And Only Native American Catholic Priest Of African Descent, Through Both Parents, On The Continent.
Chapter LVII.	William Wells Brown, Esq.	Author—Lecturer—Historian Of The Negro Race—Foreign Traveler—Medical Doctor.
Chapter LVIII.	Prof. Walter F. Craig.	Solo Violinist—Orchestra Conductor.
Chapter LIX.	Rev. Charles L. Purce, A. B.	President Of Selma University, Selma, Alabama.
Chapter LX.	Alexander Dumas.	Distinguished French Negro—Dramatist And Novelist—Voluminous Writer.
Chapter LXI.	Rev. William Reuben Pettiford.	A Successful Pastor—Trustee Of Selma University.
Chapter LXII.	Hon. Robert B. Elliott.	Congressman—Eloquent Orator—Distinguished Disciple Of Black-Stone.
Chapter LXIII.	Professor Inman Edward Page, A. B., A. M.	Principal Of Lincoln Institute—Oratorical Prize Winner At Brown University, Providence, Rhode Island.
Chapter LXIV.	Rev. E. K. Love.	From The Ditch To The Pastorate Of 5000 Christians—Editor Of The Centennial Record Of Georgia—Associate Editor—Honored Of God.
Chapter LXV.	J. A. Arneaux, Esq.	Professional Tragedian, "Black Booth"—Editor—Poet—Graduate Of Two French Institutions Of Learning.
Chapter LXVI.	Rev. Richard Allen.	First Bishop Of The A. M. E. Church—An Eminent Preacher—A Devout Man.
Chapter LXVII.	Hon. Samuel Allen Mcelwee. A. B., LL. B.	Lawyer—Legislator—President Of The Tennessee Fair Association—Orator—Speech In The Legislature On Mobs
Chapter LXVIII.	Rev. Lott Carey.	First American Missionary To Africa
Chapter LXIX.	Hon. John Mercer Langston, A. B., A. M., LL. D.	Lawyer—Minister Resident And Consul-General—Charge De Affaires—President Of The Virginia Normal And Collegiate Institute—Formerly Dean And Professor Of Law In Howard University
Chapter LXX.	Rev. William H. Mcalpine.	Baptist Divine—President Of a College—Editor Of a Weekly Journal.
Chapter LXXI.	Rev. Alexander Crummell, A. B., D. D.	Rector Of St. Luke's Church, Washington, D. C.--Professor Of Mental And Moral Science In The College Of Liberia—Author
Chapter LXXII.	Hon. George H. White.	A Member Of The House Of Representatives And The Only Colored State Solicitor And Prosecuting Attorney
Chapter LXXIII.	Hon. Josiah T. Settle, A. B., A. M., LL. B.	Eminent Lawyer—Assistant Attorney-General Of Shelby County, Tennessee—Eloquent Orator—Legislator
Chapter LXXIV.	William H. Gibson, Esq.	School Teacher In Slavery Days—Musician—Mail Agent—Revenue Agent—Grand Master U. B. Of Friendship
Chapter LXXV.	Hon. George W. Williams, LL. D.	The Most Eminent Negro Historian In The World—Author Of World Wide Reputation—Legislator—Judge-Advocate Of The Grand Army Of The Republic—Novelist—Scholar—Magnetic Orator—Editor—Soldier—Preacher—Traveler—Inister To Hayti
Chapter LXXVI.	Prof. William Eve Holmes, A. B., A. M.	Hebrew, German And French Scholar—Professor In The Atlanta Baptist Seminary
Chapter LXXVII.	Rev. Randall Bartholomew Vandervall, D. D.	A Self-Made Man—A Graduate From The School Of Adversity
Chapter LXXVIII.	Rev. Elijah P. Marrs.	Preacher—Soldier—Treasurer
Chapter LXXIX.	Rev. Daniel Jones.	Presiding Elder Of The M. E. Church—His Hair-Breadth Escapes
Chapter LXXX.	Rev. Henry N. Jeter.	Baptist Preacher
Chapter LXXXI.	Rev. J. T. White.	Divine—Editor—State Senator—Commissioner Public Of Works
Chapter LXXXII.	Rev. G. W. Gayles.	The Last Colored State Senator In The Mississippi Legislature—Moderator Of The State Convention—Member Of The Board Of Police
Chapter LXXXIII.	Hon. Mifflin Wister Gibbs.	Attorney At Law—The First Colored Judge In The United States, And An Active Politician—An Advocate Of Industrial Education—Contractor And Builder
Chapter LXXXIV.	William H. Steward, Esq.	Grand Master—Secretary—Business Manager—Letter Carrier
Chapter LXXXV.	Rev. Frank J. Grimke, A. B.	Learned And Eloquent Presbyterian Divine—Touching Memorial On Leaving Washington, D. C.
Chapter LXXXVI.	Hon. Robert Harlan.	Legislator—A Fugitive From Prejudice—Resident In England Ten Years
Chapter LXXXVII.	Dr. Anthony William Amo.	A Learned Negro—Student At Halle—Skilled In Latin And Greek—Philosophical Lecturer—Received Doctorate From The University Of Wittenberg, And Counselor Of State By The Count Of Berlin
Chapter LXXXVIII.	Rev. Rufus L. Perry, Ph. D.	Editor—Ethnologist—Essayist—Logician—Profound Student Of Negro History—Scholar In The Greek, Latin And Hebrew Languages
Chapter LXXXIX.	Rev. Bartlett Taylor.	Financier And Church Builder—Christian Pioneer
Chapter XC.	Professor James M. Gregory, A. B., A. M.	Dean Of The College Department Of Howard University—Linguist
Chapter XCI.	Rev. Daniel Abraham Gaddie, D. D.	From The Blacksmith Shop To The Pulpit—Temperance Advocate—Moderator Of Fifty Thousand Baptists
Chapter XCII.	W. Q. Atwood, Esq.	Lumber Merchant And Capitalist—Orator--
Chapter XCIII.	Rev. Henry Highland Garnet, D. D.	Minister Resident Of Liberia—Distinguished Minister Of The Gospel, And a Brilliant Orator
Chapter XCIV.	Rev. Leonard A. Grimes.	Imprisoned In Richmond, Virginia, For Assisting Fugitive Slaves To Escape From Slavery—A Lovely Disciple
Chapter XCV.	Rev. James H. Holmes.	Pastor Of a Flourishing Church In Richmond, Virginia
Chapter XCVI.	General T. Morris Chester.	General—Phonographer And Typewriter—Lawyer
Chapter XCVII.	Rev. Lemuel Haynes, A. M.	A Distinguished Theologian
Chapter XCVIII.	Hon. H. O. Wagoner.	Compositor—Deputy Sheriff—Clerk Of The Legislature.
Chapter XCIX.	Rev. Marcus Dale.	Shrewd Financier And General Manager—Business Capacity Shown.
Chapter C.	Charles B. Purvis, A. M., M. D.	Secretary And Treasurer—Professor Of Obstetrics And Diseases Of Women And Children—Surgeon In Charge Of Freedman's Hospital.
Chapter CI.	Professor W. H. Crogman, A. B., A. M.	Professor Of Classics In Clark University.
Chapter CII.	Hon. Blanche K. Bruce.	United States Senator—Register Of The United States Treasury.
Chapter CIII.	J. Dallas Bowser, Esq.	Editor Of The Gate City Press—Grain And Coal Merchant—Principal Lincoln School.
Chapter CIV.	Rev. Jesse Freeman Boulden.	Member Of The Lower House Of The Legislature Of Mississippi In Reconstruction Times—Agent Of The American Baptist Publication Society.
Chapter CV.	Rev. William T. Dixon.	Veteran Pastor Of Concord Baptist Church. Brooklyn, New York.
Chapter CVI.	Rev. Matthew Campbell.	One Of God's Servants, Full Of Years And Work For Christ—A Thirty Years' Pastorate—Married 2000 Couples.
Chapter CVII.	Rev. C. C. Vaughn.	State Grand Chief Of I. O. Good Samaritans And Daughters Of Samaria—Preacher And Teacher.
Chapter CVIII.	Rev. Harvey Johnson.	Eminent Baltimore Pastor—Prominent In The Councils Of His Church.
Chapter CIX.	Ira Aldridge.	The African Tragedian—The "African Roscius".
Chapter CX.	Hon. George L. Ruffin, LL. B.	Judge Of The Charlestown District, Massachusetts—From The Barber's Chair To The Bench.
Chapter CXI.	Professor D. Augustus Straker, LL. B., LL. D.	Dean Of Law Department—Lawyer—Orator And Stenographer.
Chapter CXII.	Rev. John Hudson Riddick.	Preacher—Councilman—Deputy Marshal.
Chapter CXIII.	Rev. J. C. Price, A. B.	President Livingstone College—Great Temperance Orator.
Chapter CXIV.	Hon. Pinckney Benton Stewart Pinchback.	Governor—Lieutenant-Governor—United States Senator—Lawyer—His Daring "Railroad Race"—Eminent Politician—Wealthy Gentleman
Chapter CXV.	Alexander Petion.	President Of Hayti—Skillful Engineer—Educated At The Military School Of France
Chapter CXVI.	Timothy Thomas Fortune, Esq.	Editor—Author—Pamphleteer—Agitator
Chapter CXVII.	Troy Porter, Esq.	Plumber, Gas And Steam Fitter—Superintendent Of Waterworks And Town Clerk
Chapter CXVIII.	Blind Tom. (Thomas Bethune.)	A Remarkable Musician—The Negro Pianist
Chapter CXIX.	Rev. Henry Adams.	A Faithful Pastor—A Good Man
Chapter CXX.	J. C. Farley, Esq.	Photographer And Prominent Citizen Of Richmond, Virginia
Chapter CXXI.	Rev. Henry McNeal Turner, D. D., LL. D.	Bishop Of A. M. E. Church—Philosopher—Politician And Orator—Eminent Lecturer—Author—Intense Race Man—United States Chaplain
Chapter CXXII.	Rev. John W. Stephenson, M. D.	Church Builder—Financier—Druggist—His Methods
Chapter CXXIII.	Professor Joseph Carter Corbin, A. B., A. M.	State Superintendent Of Public Instruction—Linguist—Master Of Latin, Greek, French, Spanish, Italian, German, Hebrew And Danish—Profound Mathematician And Musician—Organist, Pianist, Flutist
Chapter CXXIV.	Hon. James M. Trotter.	Recorder Of Deeds—Author Of Music And Some Highly Musical People.' Assistant Superintendent Of The Register Letter Department, Boston, Massachusetts—Lieutenant In The Army
Chapter CXXV.	Rev. Allen Allensworth, A. M.	The Great Children's Preacher Of The Gospel—Chaplain Of The Twenty-Fourth Infantry Of The U. S.--Presidential Elector—Agent Of The American Baptist Publication Society
Chapter CXXVI.	Rev. George Washington Dupee.	Eminent Minister—Moderator Of The General Association—Editor—Preacher Of 12000 Funeral Sermons—Baptizer Of 8000 Candidates
Chapter CXXVII.	Samuel C. Watson, M. D.	Druggist—Doctor—Member Of City Council—First Colored Clerk Of a Steamboat Owned By a Colored Man
Chapter CXXVIII.	Rt. Rev. Richard Harvey Cain, D. D.	Bishop Of The A. M. E. Church—Congressman—Senator In The South Carolina Legislature—President Of Paul Quinn College
Chapter CXXIX.	Hon. John H. Smythe, LL. B., LL. D.	United States Minister—Resident Minister—Consul-General To Liberia—Attorney At Law
Chapter CXXX.	J. J. Durham, A. B., A. M., M. D.	Valedictorian In The Medical School—A Vigorous, Convincing Debater—Preacher
Chapter CXXXI.	Rev. Benjamin W. Arnett, D. D.	Financial Secretary Of The A. M. E. Church—The Statistician Of His Church—Author—Editor Of The Budget—Legislator—Author Of The Bill Wiping Out The "Black Laws" Of Ohio
Chapter CXXXII.	Olandah Equiano, Or Gustavus Vassa.	A Virginia Slave—Purchases His Freedom—Sails For London—Presents a Petition To The Queen
Chapter CXXXIII.	John W. Cromwell, Esq.	Editor—Distinguished English Scholar—Lawyer—President Of The Bethel Literary Society, Washington, D. C.--Examiner And Register Of Money Order Accounts
Chapter CXXXIV.	Rev. E. M. Brawley, D. D.	Editor Baptist Tribune—President Of Selma University—Sunday School Agent Of South Carolina
Chapter CXXXV.	James W. C. Pennington, D. D.	Able Presbyterian Divine—Greek, Latin And German Scholar
Chapter CXXXVI.	Hon. Edward Wilmot Blyden, LL. D.	Linguist—Oriental Scholar—Arabic Professor—Magazine Writer—Minister Plenipotentiary—President Of Liberia College
Chapter CXXXVII.	Rev. B. F. Lee, D. D.	Editor Of The Christian Recorder—President Of Wilberforce University For Many Years
Chapter CXXXVIII.	Hon. J. J. Spelman.	State Senator—Temperance Orator—Eminent Baptist Layman
Chapter CXXXIX.	Rev. Marshall W. Taylor, D. D.	Editor Of The Southwestern Advocate—Brilliant Writer
Chapter CXL.	Toussaint L'Ouverture.	The Negro Soldier, Statesman And Martyr
Chapter CXLI.	Hon. Hiram R. Revels.	United States Senator—A. M. E. Preacher—President Of The Alcorn University—Planter
Chapter CXLII.	Rev. Harrison N. Bouey.	Missionary To Africa—Agent American Baptist Publication Society—District Secretary
Chapter CXLIII.	Colonel James Lewis.	Surveyor-General—Colonel Of The Second Regiment State Militia—Collector Of The New Orleans Port—Naval Officer—Superintendent Of The United States Bonded Warehouses
Chapter CXLIV.	Rev. E. H. Lipscombe, A. B., A. M.	President Of The Western Union Institute—Professor Of Rhetoric And Moral Philosophy—Preacher—Editor Of The Mountain Gleaner
Chapter CXLV.	Hon. James C. Matthews.	Lawyer And Recorder Of Deeds, Washington, D. C.
Chapter CXLVI.	Professor William Howard Day, D. D.	Able And Forcible Orator—Practical Printer—Veteran Editor—Philanthropist—Agitator—Progressive Race Man
Chapter CXLVII.	Rev. Benjamin Tucker Tanner, A. M., D. D.	Editor A. M. E. Review—Twenty Years An Editor—For Many Years Editor Of The Christian Recorder—Author Of Ecclesiastical Works
Chapter CXLVIII.	Geoffrey L'Islet.	Correspondent Of The French Academy Of Sciences—Versed In The Sciences Of Botany, Natural Philosophy, Zoology And Astronomy
Chapter CXLIX.	R. C. O. Benjamin, Esq.	Lawyer—Author—Editor—Champion Of The Race
Chapter CL.	Hon. John J. Irvine.	Clerk Of The Circuit Court Of Chattanooga, Tennessee
Chapter CLI.	George T. Downing, Esq.	Aggressive Politician—An Intimate Friend Of Charles Sumner—An Old Time Warrior For Free Speech And Human Rights—A Man Of Pronounced Convictions
Chapter CLII.	Major Martin R. Delaney, M. D.	Scientist—Ethnologist—Lecturer—Discoverer—Member Of The International Statistical Conference
Chapter CLIII.	Rev. J. B. Fields.	An Able, Eloquent Baptist Divine—Popular Historian—Lecturer—The Annihilator Of Ingersollism
Chapter CLIV.	Robert Pelham, Jr.	The Able Editor Of The Detroit Plaindealer—A Vigorous Writer—An Active Politician
Chapter CLV.	Professor B. T. Washington.	Principal Of The Tuskegee Normal School—A Successful Career—A Wonderful Institution—Industrial Education
Chapter CLVI.	Rev. J. P. Campbell, D. D., LL. D.	Bishop Of The A. M. E. Church—The Theologian Of The Denomination
Chapter CLVII.	Nat. Turner.	Insurrectionist
Chapter CLVIII.	Hon. Hilery Richard Wright Johnson.	President Of Liberia—An Accomplished English And Classical Scholar—A Master Of German, French And Mathematics
Chapter CLIX.	Hon. John R. Lynch.	Prominent Politician—Orator—Lawyer—Congressman—Presided At The National Republican Convention.
Chapter CLX.	Rev. P. H. A. Braxton.	Pastor Of The Calvary Baptist Church, Baltimore, Maryland—Writer—Speaker.
Chapter CLXI.	Professor T. McCants Stewart. A. B., LL. B.	Attorney At Law—Professor And Author.
Chapter CLXII.	Hon. E. P. McCabe.	Auditor Of Kansas—County Clerk—Successful Politician.
Chapter CLXIII.	Rev. Charles Henry Parrish, A. B.	A Rising Young Man—From The Position Of Janitor To The Secretaryship Of a University.
Chapter CLXIV.	Rev. John Jasper.	"The Sun Do Move".
Chapter CLXV.	James E. J. Capitein.	A Negro Born In Africa—Taken To Europe—Educated In Holland—Latin Poet.
Chapter CLXVI.	Rev. D. A. Payne, D. D., LL. D.	Senior Bishop Of The A. M. E. Church—Educator And Author—The Scholar Of The Denomination.
Chapter CLXVII.	Rev. I. M. Burgan, B. D.	President Of Paul Quinn College—Educator—Pioneer.
Chapter CLXVIII.	Rev. W. J. White.	Editor Of The Georgia Baptist.
Chapter CLXIX.	Hon. Alexander Clark.	Eminent Mason—Lawyer—Editor.
Chapter CLXX.	Hon. John C. Dancy.	Editor Of The Star Of Zion—Eminent Layman In The A. M. E. Zion Church—Recorder Of Deeds Of Edgecombe Co., North Carolina.
Chapter CLXXI.	Professor Charles L. Reason.	A Veteran New York School Teacher—European Traveler—One Of The Giants In Anti-Slavery Days.
Chapter CLXXII.	Rev. John M. Brown, D. D., D. C. L.	An Active Bishop In The A. M. E. Church.
Chapter CLXXIII.	Professor David Abner, Jr.	A Rising Young Professor In Bishop College, Texas—Editor—Lecturer.
Chapter CLXXIV.	Rev. A. A. Whitman.	Author Of a Book Of Poems, Entitled, 'Not a Man, And Yet a Man,' With Miscellaneous Poems.
Chapter CLXXV.	E. M. Bannister, Esq.	An Artist Photographer—The Gifted Painter Of Providence, Who Was Inspired To Paint Pictures By a Slur In The New York Herald Twenty Years Ago
Chapter CLXXVI.	Hon. C. C. Antoine.	Lieutenant-Governor Of Louisiana—State Senator—Prominent Politician
Chapter CLXXVII.	James Matthew Townsend, D. D.	Corresponding Secretary Of The Parent Home And Foreign Missionary Society Of The A. M. E. Church—A Man Of Perseverance And Sound Judgment
