= Prairieville =

Prairieville may refer to a place in the United States:

- Prairieville, Alabama, an unincorporated community
- Prairieville, Louisiana, an unincorporated community
- Prairieville, Missouri, a ghost town
- Prairieville, Texas, an unincorporated community
- Prairieville, Wisconsin, former name of Waukesha
- Prairieville Township, Michigan
- Prairieville Township, Minnesota
- Prairieville Township, Pike County, Missouri
