= Artishia Gilbert =

American physician (1868–1904)

Artishia Garcia Gilbert
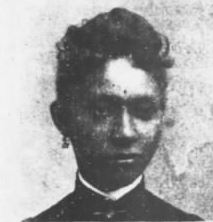
- Born: Artishia Garcia Gilbert; June 2, 1868; Manchester, Clay County, Kentucky
- Died: April 2, 1904 (aged 35); Louisville, Jefferson County, Kentucky
- Other names: Artishia Gilbert Wilkerson, A. G. Gilbert, A. G. Wilkerson
- Occupations: Teacher, Physician
- Years active: 1890–1904
- Known for: First African American woman licensed to practice medicine in Kentucky
- Children: 3, including Artishia Wilkerson Jordan

Artishia Garcia Gilbert (1868–1904) (also known as Artishia Gilbert-Wilkerson) was an African-American physician who was likely the first African American woman licensed to practice medicine in the U.S. state of Kentucky. After earning her undergraduate and master's degrees in Kentucky, Gilbert earned her medical degree in Washington, D.C. While continuing her education, Gilbert taught at her alma mater and upon obtaining her license continued to both teach and practice medicine in Louisville.

== Early life ==
Artishia Garcia Gilbert was born on June 2, 1868, in Manchester, Clay County, Kentucky, to Amanda (née Hopper) and William Gilbert. She was the younger of two children. Her parents were farmers and until she was six years old, her father migrated to various communities, and the family had no fixed residence. Each place that they lived, Gilbert made acquaintance with the local teachers, soon learning to spell and read. In 1878, her parents moved to Louisville and she entered the public schools, remaining for the next three years.

In 1881, Gilbert converted to Christianity and entered the Normal and Theological Institute run by Rev. William J. Simmons, (later known as State University). In 1885, she graduated from the Normal and Theological Institute and enrolled in university studies. While a student, Gilbert taught Sunday school and performed various jobs to assist her mother in paying her tuition costs. She graduated with an A.B. degree in 1889 as valedictorian of her class.

== Career ==
Upon completing her education, Gilbert began working as the editor of the magazine Our Women and Children, but when offered a teaching position in 1890 at her alma mater, she took the position as an English teacher and instructor of Greek grammar. A popular speaker on the Women's Baptist Educational Convention tours, Gilbert spoke at many organizations held throughout the American South and served as a representative at the National Baptist Conventions. She was a matron at State University and served on the board of the Colored Orphan's Home, as well as president of several women's groups. She was associated with the Bell Embroidery Club, Ladies Union Band, Sons and Daughters of the Calvary, Sons and Daughters of the Morning, Women's Federation Board, Women's Industrial Club, and the Women's Improvement Club. Gilbert attended the short-lived, African American-run Louisville National Medical College (1881–1911), earning her Master of Arts degree in 1893. Thereafter, she earned what was likely the first medical license issued to an African American woman in the state of Kentucky, after passing the licensing examination.

Gilbert opened her medical practice at 938 Dumesnil Street, Louisville and remained listed in national physician registries at this address through 1902. In 1896, Gilbert furthered her education at Howard University in Washington, D. C., receiving her Doctor of Medicine degree upon her graduation the following year. While in the capital, she met Bernard Orange "B.O." Wilkerson, whom she married on June 1, 1897, in New York City. Returning to Louisville, Gilbert worked as an assistant to the obstetrics professor of the Medical Department at State University and was the superintendent of the Red Cross Sanitarium of Louisville. She had three children: B.O. Jr., Artishia Garcia Jr., and a male infant who was two weeks old at the time of Gilbert's death.

== Death and legacy ==
Gilbert died two weeks after having given birth to her youngest child and was buried on April 2, 1904, in a service which was widely attended by family, friends, and business colleagues.

== See also ==
- William H. Perry Sr. (1860–1946) the first African American physician who passed the Kentucky state medical licensing board
