= Daniel Abraham Gaddie =

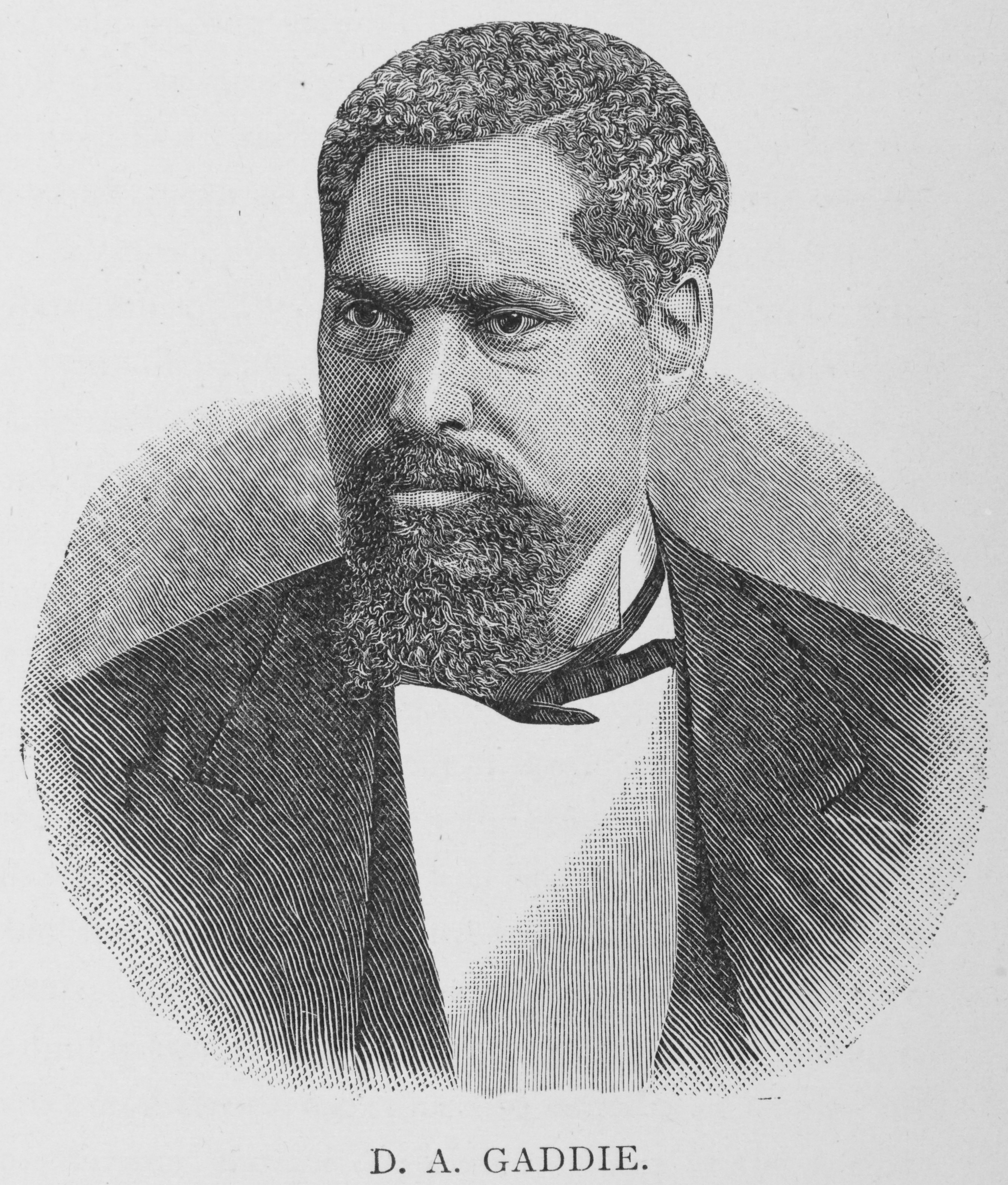
- Gaddie in 1887
- Born: May 21, 1832; Hart County, Kentucky
- Died: November 13, 1911 (aged 79); Louisville, Kentucky, United States
- Other name: Daniel Abraham Jamison
- Education: Simmons College of Kentucky
- Occupations: Minister, blacksmith

Religious life
- Religion: Baptist

Daniel Abraham Gaddie (May 21, 1836 – November 13, 1911) was a Baptist preacher in Louisville, Kentucky. He was known for his leadership in state and national Baptist organizations.

== Biography ==
Gaddie was born May 21, 1836. At birth, he had the last name "Jamison", the name of his father and slave owner. When freed, he changed his name to Gaddie. He was born in Hart County, Kentucky.

He was ordained in 1865 by a committee including Rev. Henry Adams, Rev. Richard Sneethen, Charles Edwards, and Solomon Patterson. He was pastor in several cities in Kentucky. After Rev. Sneethen died on April 11, 1872, Gaddie was elected pastor of Glendale and Green Street Baptist church in October 1872. He served at Green Street until 1911. In that role, he became a prominent leader among Kentucky Baptists and Kentucky African Americans. He was a leading participant of the 1869 Kentucky Colored Education Convention. Starting in the 1870s, he was a delegate and eventually an officer of the General Association of Kentucky Baptists. He was treasurer at the St. Louis National American Baptist Convention August 25, 1886. He was also elected vice president at the American Consolidated Baptist convention and a member of the board of trustees and the executive board at the Simmons College of Kentucky. He received an honorary doctorate of divinity from Simmons College on May 17, 1887.

Gaddie was a fiery and imposing figure. Before becoming a preacher, he had worked as a blacksmith, and he was called an "Ajax in bravery, a Hercules in strength." In 1898, Gaddie gave a controversial sermon opposing the coming Spanish–American War, basing his argument on the lack of legal protection afforded blacks in America.

Gaddie died on Monday, November 13, 1911. He preached at Sunday services the day before when he took ill. Physicians pronounced his trouble to be acute indigestion. Gaddie was buried in Eastern Cemetery in Louisville.
