= William H. Perry Sr. =

American physician, educator (1860–1946)

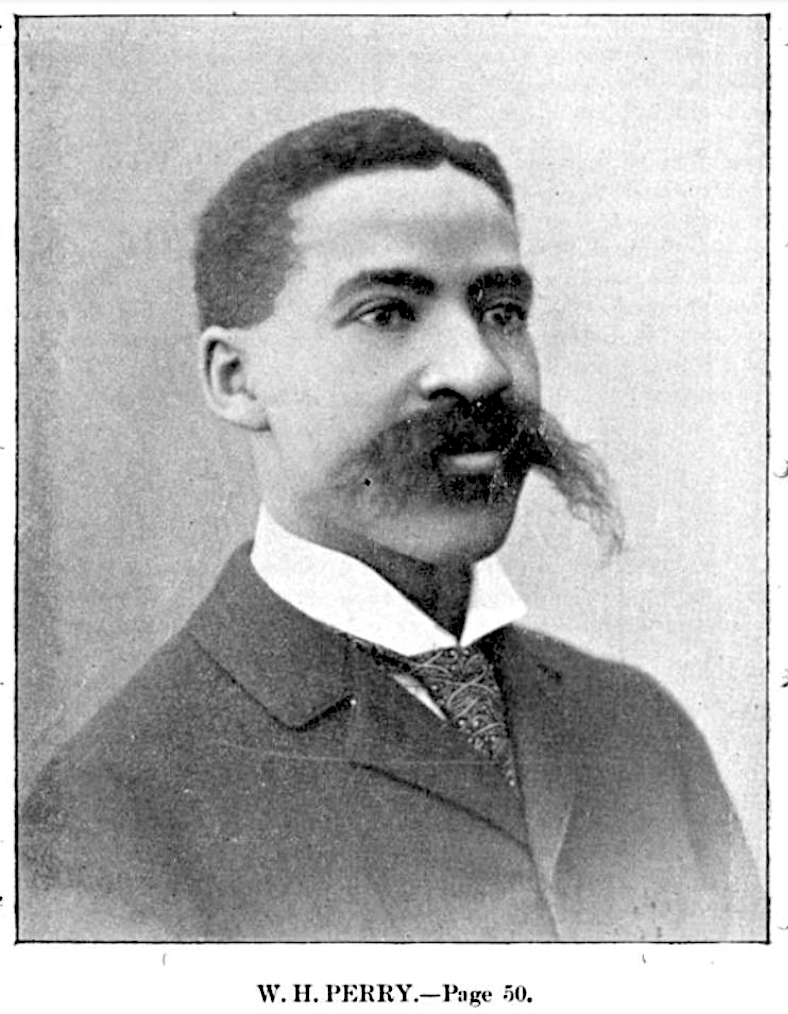
- c. 1897
- Born: William Henry Perry; March 5, 1860; Terre Haute, Indiana, U.S.
- Died: October 13, 1946 (aged 86); Anchorage, Kentucky, U.S.
- Other name: W. H. Perry
- Education: Central Law School (LL.B), Commercial College of Terre Haute, Chautauqua Institution, Illinois Medical College (MD)
- Occupations: Physician, educator, principal, mason, poet, public speaker
- Spouse: Anna Augusta Ridley
- Children: 4

William Henry Perry Sr., also known as W. H. Perry (March 5, 1860 – October 13, 1946) was an American physician, educator, and principal. He was also a member of the freemasons, poet, and public speaker. He was the first Black physician to receive his license by passing the Kentucky state medical licensing board. He was the posthumous namesake of Dr. William H. Perry Elementary School in Louisville, Kentucky.

== Early life and education ==
William H. Perry was born on March 5, 1860, in Terre Haute, Indiana, to parents Anna (née Hill) from Virginia and Charles B. Perry from Kentucky. His parents had been enslaved and were connected to the Lost Creek community in Indiana. After his father's death, he moved in 1876 with his mother to Louisville, Kentucky. He graduated in 1877 from Central High School in Louisville, where he graduated with distinction.

Perry graduated with a LL.B. degree from Central Law School in Louisville, where he was valedictorian; he had a certificate from the Commercial College of Terre Haute; graduated in 1893 from the Chautauqua Literary and Scientific Circle (CLSC), at Chautauqua Institution in Chautauqua, New York; and graduated with a medical degree in 1907 from Illinois Medical College (now Stritch School of Medicine at Loyola University Chicago).

University president Rev. James Henry Garnett of Simmons College of Kentucky conferred a M.A. degree to Perry in the 1890s.

== Career ==
From 1878 until 1881, Perry taught advanced courses at his alma mater Central High School. In 1877, he became a professor at Western High School in Louisville. From 1881 until 1891, Perry served as the principal of Eastern High School in Louisville (later Booker T. Washington School). Starting in 1891, Perry served as the principal of Western Elementary School. In 1927, he retired from working the public education system after serving 32 years.

For many years he was the president of the Louisville Teachers' Association; president of the Kentucky State Teachers' Association; president of the alumni society; the grand secretary of the Grand Chapter of Kentucky Royal Arch Masons; and president and secretary of the Orphans' Home of Louisville. Perry was president of the Kentucky Negro Education Association from 1885 until 1887.

He returned to college in the 1890s, and attended medical school at Illinois Medical College. Perry received a medical license from the Kentucky State Board of Medical Examiners in 1908 after passing the exam, and became the first Black physician to achieve this. In the 1899, he was a co-founder of the Red Cross Hospital in Louisville.

== Death and legacy ==
At the time of his death he was a 33rd degree Scottish Rite Mason. Perry died at age 86 on October 13, 1946, at his daughter Sarah's house in Anchorage, Kentucky. He was interred at Louisville Cemetery.

His son William H. Perry Jr. was also a local principal, serving 32 years at Russell Junior High School in Louisville.

In 1952, he was the posthumous namesake of Dr. William H. Perry Elementary School in Louisville, Kentucky (formerly Western Elementary School where he was principal), and later known as Roosevelt–Perry Elementary School.

== See also ==
- Artishia Gilbert (1868–1904) likely the first African American woman licensed to practice medicine in Kentucky
