= Prairieville Township =

Prairieville Township may refer to:

- Prairieville Township, Michigan
- Prairieville Township, Brown County, Minnesota
- Prairieville Township, Pike County, Missouri
