= Solomon T. Clanton =

American theologian and Baptist leader

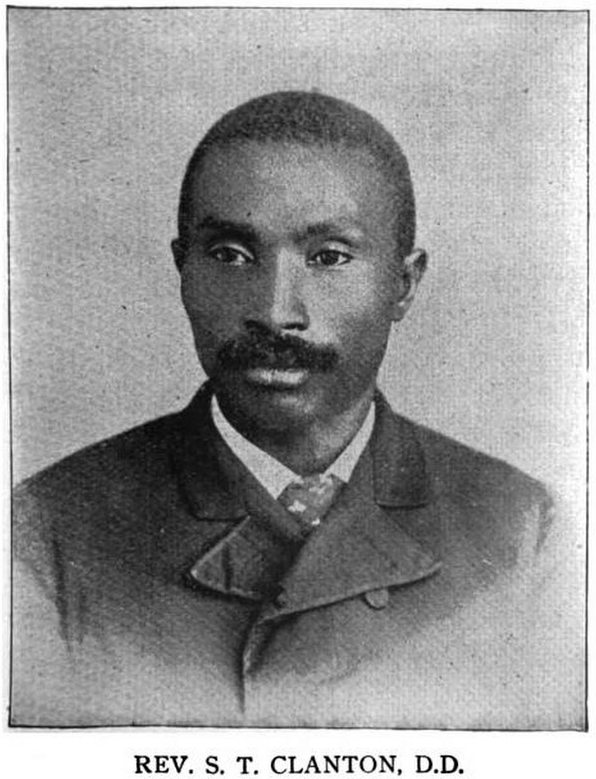
- Clanton in 1892
- Born: March 27, 1857; Cypremort, Louisiana, U.S.
- Died: May 18, 1918 (aged 61); Chicago, Illinois
- Education: New Orleans University, Baptist Union Theological Seminary, Simmons College of Kentucky
- Occupation: Minister
- Political party: Republican

Religious life
- Religion: Baptist

Solomon T. Clanton (March 27, 1857 – May 18, 1918) was a leader in the Baptist Church. He was educated in New Orleans and Chicago and became the first black graduate of the theological department at the Baptist Union Theological Seminary at Morgan Park, Chicago, Illinois, associated with the University of Chicago. He spent his career as an educator and leader in the Baptist Church. He served as a professor at Leland University, Alabama A&M University, and Selma University, and before his death as assistant librarian at the University of Chicago. He was acting president for a short time at Alabama A&M and was dean of the theological department at Selma University. During his career, he was also an educator in high schools and Sunday schools.

== Early life ==
Solomon T. Clanton was born March 27, 1857, in Cypremort, Louisiana to Solomon T. and Mary (née Jones) Clanton. His father was born in Petersburg, Virginia, and his mother in Lynchburg, Virginia. Clanton entered government schools at the age of five in 1862. His father died when he was about nine years old leaving him, his mother, and his sisters, Elvina and P. A. He passed a high school entrance examination, but was denied entry to the white school, so he entered New Orleans University where he graduated with an A.B. on July 20, 1878. That December he was appointed instructor of mathematics at Leland University, then run by the American Baptist Home Mission Society, in New Orleans which he held until May 1880. His appointment at Leland was under the influence of Holbrook Chamberlain, G. W. Walker, A. R. Blount, and Esau Carter. Clanton was an active Baptist and spent the summers of 1877, 1879, 1880, 1881, and 1882 working for the Sunday school mission of the American Baptist Publication Society. At Leland, he had met James R. Boise of the Baptist Union Theological Seminary at Morgan Park, Chicago, Illinois, and in September 1880 he entered the Seminary at Morgan Park where he graduated with a B.D. May 17, 1883 as the first black graduate of the theological department. In 1888 he was given a degree of Master of Arts by New Orleans University and in 1892 was granted a D. D. by the State University, Louisville, Kentucky.

== Career ==
In June 1883 he was elected Sunday school missionary of the American Baptist Publication Society. He also served as secretary of the American Baptist Foreign Mission and in August 1886 was elected secretary at the American Baptist National Convention. The convention was led by William J. Simmons and Richard DeBaptiste. A major issue facing the group was unifying black Baptists for mutual support and to increase their "race confidence" as Clanton put it in a presentation of a paper he wrote. James T. White gave a similar, notable presentation at the conference. He was a pastor in Elgin, Illinois, and in Evanston, Illinois. He served as missionary colporteur in Louisiana and Illinois. He was recording secretary for the first District Association of Louisiana, financial secretary of the Ministers' Mutual Aid Society of Louisiana, and district secretary of the Gulf District of the American Baptist Publication Society. In 1889 he was an officer of the black Baptist Foreign Mission Convention in Indianapolis led by Emanuel K. Love which sent a delegation to the president to protest violence against blacks in the South. He also was editor of the Christian Herald and later, in 1898, of the Louisiana Baptist. He also held the position of field secretary of the American Doctors' Publishing Society of Philadelphia.

Clanton was active in the Republican Party. In 1892 he was an at-large delegate from Louisiana to the 1892 Republican National Convention In 1895 he was the secretary at the Colored Baptist Foreign Mission Convention, again presided by E. K. Love. Also in 1895 he became principal of the North Louisiana Industrial High School for blacks In 1903 he became chaplain and principal of the Normal Department of the Agricultural and Mechanical College of Alabama and served that year as acting president during the illness of the institute's regular president Later in his career he moved to the Alabama Baptist Colored University (also called Selma University) and became dean of the Theological Department. In the fall of 1917 he became assistant library at the University of Chicago.

== Family and death ==
On June 6, 1883, Clanton married Olive Bird of Decatur, Illinois, daughter of John and Rebecca Bird. They had six children, including Edna, Georgie, Bennie, Solomon, and Dwight. Bennie and Solomon became an attourneys in Springfield, Illinois, and Chicago. Dwight was a Corporal in World War I. Georgie died in 1911 Clanton died May 18, 1918, in Chicago. His funeral was at Antioch Baptist Church in his wife's home town of Decatur.
