= William Steward =

William Steward may refer to:

- William Steward (New Zealand politician) (1841–1912), first Liberal Speaker of the New Zealand House of Representatives
- William Steward (British politician) (1901–1987), British Member of Parliament for Woolwich West
- William Steward (rector), rector of St Giles in the Fields 1579-90
- William Henry Steward, president of the National Afro-American Council in the United States
