= 1961 United States state legislative elections =

- November 7, 1961

5 legislative chambers 3 states
	Majority party	Minority party
Party	Democratic	Republican
Chambers before	62	34
Chambers after	62	34
Overall change	Steady	Steady

The 1961 United States state legislative elections were held on November 7, 1961, for at least five state legislative chambers in at least three states.

== State summaries ==
=== New Jersey ===
Democrats retained control of the New Jersey General Assembly and Republicans retained control of the New Jersey Senate.

New Jersey Senate
Party	Before	After	Change
Republican	11	11	Steady
Democratic	10	10	Steady
Total	21	21	

New Jersey General Assembly
Party	Before	After	Change
Democratic	34	38	▲4
Republican	26	22	▼4
Total	60	60	

=== Kentucky ===
Democrats retained control of the Kentucky House of Representatives and of the Kentucky Senate. Amelia Tucker, elected to the House, was the first Black woman to serve as a state legislator in Kentucky.

Kentucky Senate
Party	Before	After	Change
Democratic	30	29	▼1
Republican	8	9	▲1
Total	38	38	

Kentucky House of Representatives
Party	Before	After	Change
Democratic	80	74	▼6
Republican	20	26	▲6
Total	100	100	

=== Virginia ===
Democrats retained control of the Virginia House of Delegates. Democrats won ninety-four of one hundred seats, a loss of two, Republicans won five, a gain of one, and an independent gained a seat.

Virginia House of Delegates
Party	Before	After	Change
Democratic	96	94	▼2
Republican	4	5	▲1
Independent	0	1	▲1
Total	100	100	
