= William H. Gibson =

William H. Gibson may refer to:

- William Harvey Gibson (1821–1894), politician from Ohio and Union Army general
- William H. Gibson (educator) (1829–1906), educator and community organizer in Louisville, Kentucky
- William Hamilton Gibson (1850–1896), American illustrator, author and naturalist
