= Alice Robinson Boise Wood =

US scholar

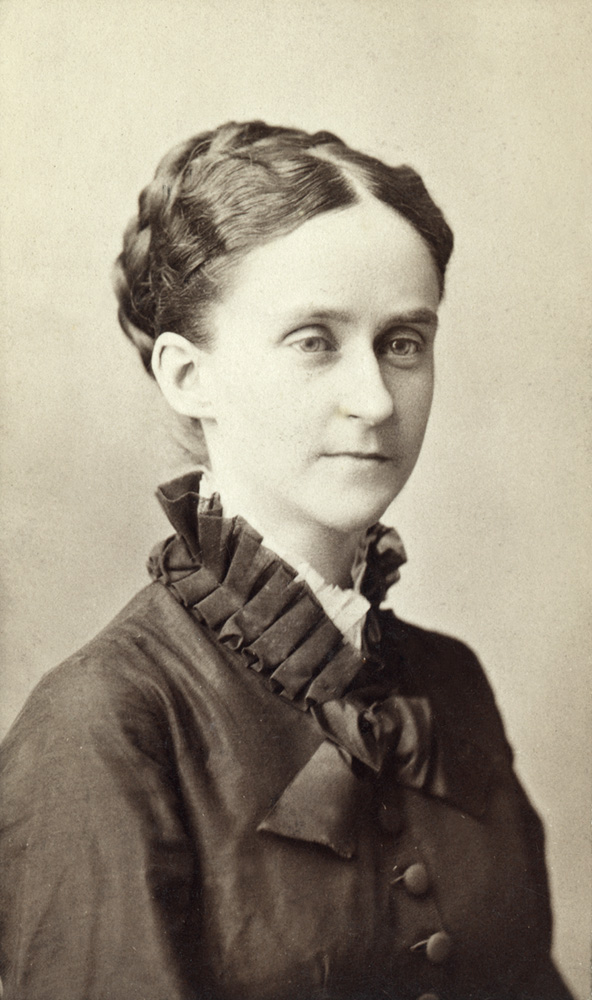
- Alice Robinson Boise Wood, 1872. University of Chicago Photographic Archive, apf1-05315, Special Collections Research Center, University of Chicago Library
- Born: May 15, 1846; Providence, Rhode Island, U.S.
- Died: March 28, 1919 (aged 72); Arlington, Massachusetts, U.S.
- Occupations: Classicist and poet

Alice Robinson Boise Wood (May 15, 1846 – March 28, 1919) was an American classicist and poet, and the first woman both to attend classes at the University of Michigan and to matriculate and graduate from the Old University of Chicago.

== Early life ==
Alice Robinson Boise Wood was born in Providence, Rhode Island, to James Robinson Boise, a professor of classics, and Sarah Goodyear Boise, on May 15, 1846.

== University studies ==
Alice Robinson Boise Wood became the first woman to attend the University of Michigan when she joined several Classics classes, including her father's Greek recitations, in September 1866, although she was not allowed to matriculate; the first woman to matriculate as a Michigan student was Madelon Stockwell in 1870. In 1867 she joined the Old University of Chicago, where she was allowed to attend classes and in 1872 became the first woman to graduate from the university with a B.A.; she earned her M.A. from the same university in 1875. Boise Wood was one of only eight women inaugural members of the American Philological Association when it was founded in 1869. Her pioneering status in women's university education led to her being described as 'The Entering Wedge for Women'.

== Career ==
After graduating, Boise Wood worked as a teaching assistant in Classics at the Old University of Chicago, as well as assisting her father with publications including an edition of Xenophon's Anabasis. From 1877 to 1884 she taught Greek, French, and German at the Wayland Academy in Beaver Dam, Wisconsin, of which her husband Nathan Eusebius Wood (1849-1937; the couple married in 1873) was Principal. Boise Wood was also a poet and hymn-writer, publishing in periodicals such as St. Nicholas. She died in Arlington, Massachusetts on March 28, 1919.
