= James B. Fields =

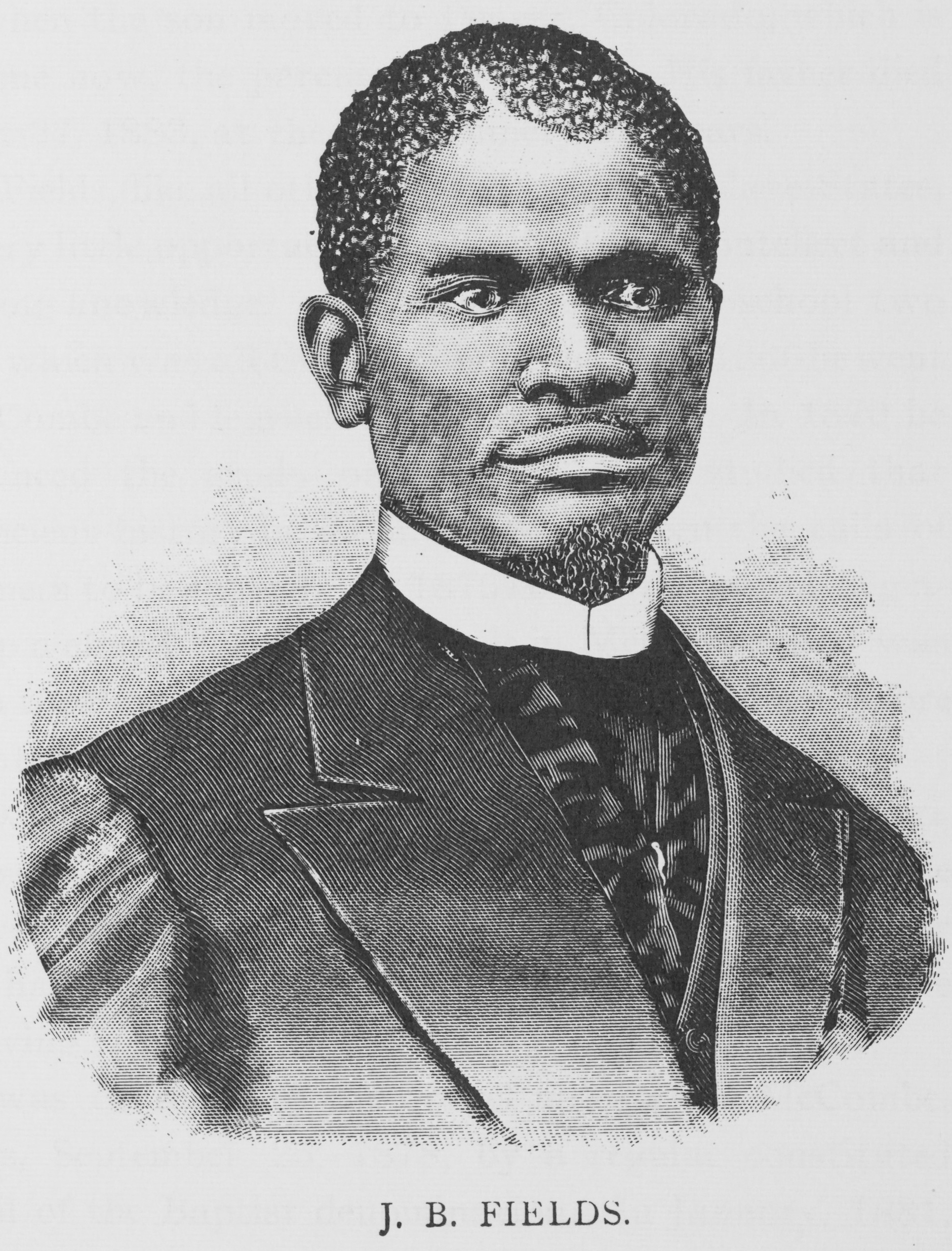
- Born: March 1, 1850; Prairieville, Missouri
- Died: August 1, 1896 (aged 46); Salt Lake City, Utah
- Occupation: Minister
- Political party: Republican, Democratic

Religious life
- Religion: Baptist

James B. Fields (March 1, 1850 – August 1, 1896) was a Baptist preacher and orator in Illinois and Denver, Colorado. He was known for his orations in opposition to agnostic, Robert G. Ingersoll.

== Early life ==
James B. Fields was born a slave on March 1, 1850, in Prairieville, Missouri. His parents were Henry and Minnie Fields and had originated in Virginia. The family escaped slavery in 1862 to the town of Quincy, Illinois. In Quincy, Fields received two years of school, and during that period joined the Baptist church. In 1866 moved to Macomb, Illinois, to learn to be a barber. In October 1869 he married Missouri Carr in Palmyra, Missouri. They had three children, all sons. In 1870, while working as a barber, he began to study theology, and in 1875 he formed a church for blacks in Macomb. James later moved to Denver, Colorado, and his parents followed. His father died August 27, 1883, at the age of 91.

== Career ==
On September 25, 1878, Fields was ordained in Macomb, and in September 1879, Fields first became nationally renowned with an oration given in Galesburg, Illinois. In January 1881 he was called to take charge of the Zion Baptist church in Denver. He was very successful at that church, helping to build a new church building and grow the congregation. In January 1885, Fields resigned to take work as a public lecturer, his oration having become very popular. That year he toured the country giving a speeches largely aimed at refuting Robert G. Ingersoll, a famous agnostic of the era. Fields continued to tour in 1866 but later returned to work in Denver.

Early in his career, Fields was affiliated with the Republican Party, but shortly before his death became a Democrat. In late September, 1896, Fields went to Salt Lake City, Utah, to speak and raise money for the Baptist Missionary Society of North America, but his trip was cut short. On August 1, 1896, while in Salt Lake City, he died of heart disease.
