= Edward S. Porter =

American physician (1848–1902)

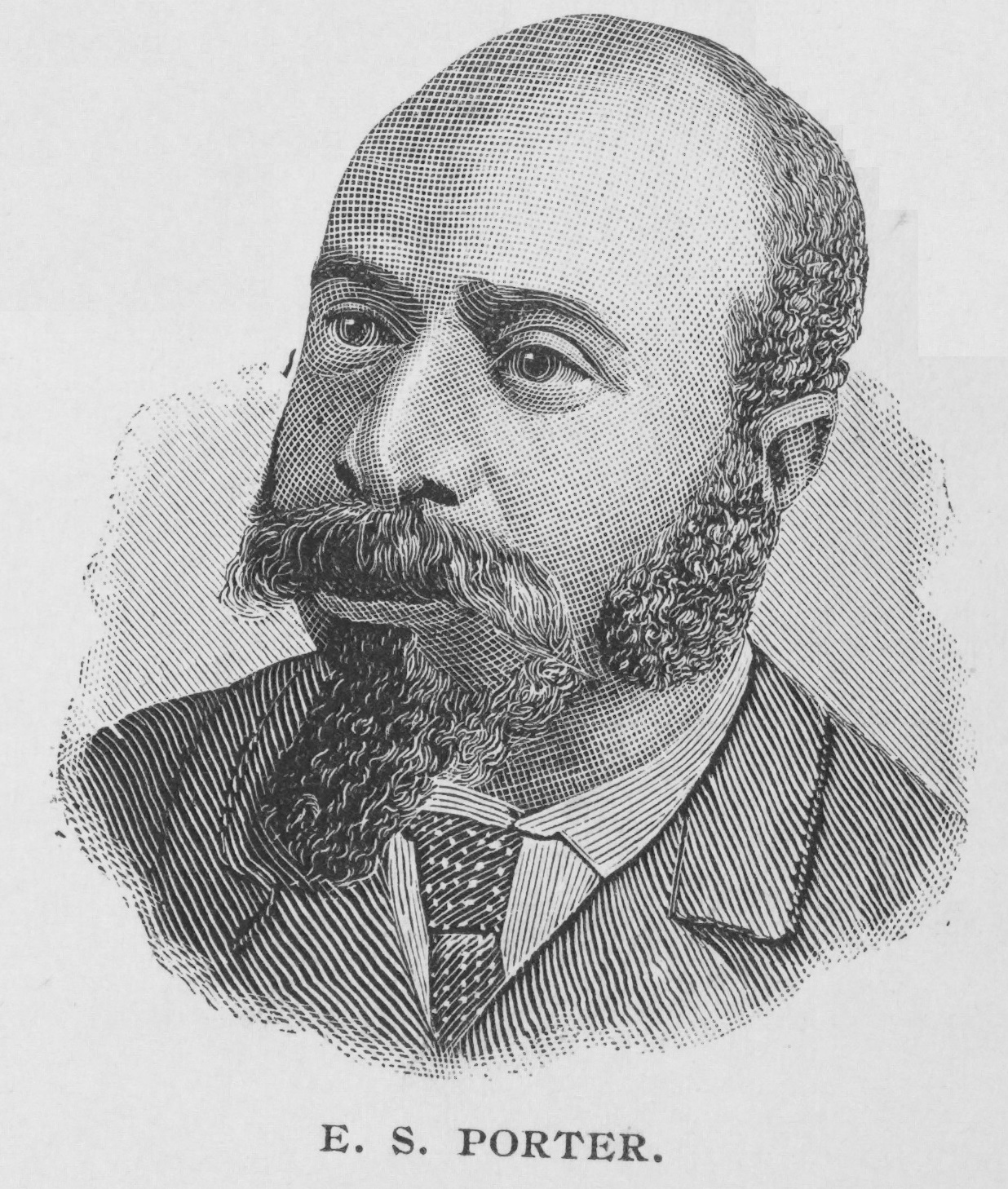
- Porter in 1887
- Born: October 19, 1848; Delaware, U.S.
- Died: June 13, 1902 (aged 53); Louisville, Kentucky, U.S.
- Resting place: Cave Hill Cemetery; Louisville, Kentucky, U.S.
- Education: Lincoln University, Brooklyn Medical College, Bellevue Hospital Medical College
- Occupation: Physician
- Spouses: Lucy Bohannon (m. 1884): Emma Young

Edward S. Porter (October 19, 1848 – June 13, 1902) was a physician in Louisville, Kentucky. He was a physician for the Louisville city sanitary force, the Orphan's home, at the nearby insane asylum, and at Simmons College of Kentucky.

== Early life ==
Edward S. Porter was born in Delaware on October 19, 1848, to Jesse and Priscilla Porter. He attended Lincoln University in Oxford, Pennsylvania, for seven years, finally getting a Bachelor of Arts in 1873. He then attended the Brooklyn Medical College graduating in 1876. He was also a graduate of Bellevue Hospital Medical College in New York City.

== Career ==
After schooling, he moved to Tennessee for one year before moving to Louisville, Kentucky in about 1878. In 1881 he became physician at the State University (later Simmons College of Kentucky) and was a professor there. He was elected a part of the Louisville city sanitary force in 1882–1884. He was also physician at the Orphan's home starting in 1882. He was secretary of the Board of Commissioners for the Central Asylum for the Insane until two years before his death, living in nearby Anchorage, Kentucky. In about 1870, he began to be associated with the Louisville Gas Company, and from about 1882 until his death he was the company's secretary.

== Family and death ==
He was a member of the Fifth Street Baptist church in Louisville and sang in the church choir. He married Lucy Bohannon on March 20, 1884 He later remarried Emma Young. He died on June 13, 1902, of tuberculosis in Louisville. He had been ill for a number of years prior and had spent some time in California and Las Vegas, Nevada, to recuperate before his death. He was survived by four daughters: Mrs. W. L. Mapother, Evelyn, Florence, and Alice, as well as two siblings, Walter and Alice. His funeral was at the home of a brother-in-law and he was buried at Cave Hill Cemetery
