= Hercules Burnett =

American baseball player (1865–1936)

- Center fielder / First baseman
- Born: August 13, 1865; Louisville, Kentucky, U.S.
- Died: October 4, 1936 (aged 71); Louisville, Kentucky, U.S
- Batted: Right Threw: Unknown

MLB debut
- June 26, 1888, for the Louisville Colonels

Last MLB appearance
- September 29, 1895, for the Louisville Colonels

MLB statistics
- Batting average: .333
- Home runs: 2
- Runs batted in: 3
- Stats at Baseball Reference

Teams
- Louisville Colonels (1888, 1895)

Hercules H. Burnett (August 13, 1865 – October 4, 1936) was an American professional baseball player and manager. He played in the major leagues as an outfielder and first baseman for the Louisville Colonels in the late 19th century.

== Biography ==
Burnett's professional career spanned 1887 to 1903, although records of the era are incomplete. He played one game in the major leagues for the Louisville Colonels in 1888 while the team was in the American Association, and five games in 1895 when the Colonels were a member of the National League. He had a .333 batting average (7-for-21) and had three walks and three stolen bases. Of his seven hits, one was a triple and two were home runs, yielding a .714 slugging average. In 1897, while playing in the Western League, he was fined for hitting an umpire, then subsequently suspended for refusing to pay the fine. In 1903, he served as player-manager for the Montgomery Black Sox of the Interstate League.

Outside of his baseball career, Burnett worked for 47 years for the Louisville and Nashville Railroad. He was already working for the railroad, as a fireman, at the time of his marriage in 1889. He died in 1936 at the age of 71 in his hometown of Louisville, Kentucky, and is interred at Eastern Cemetery there.

== See also ==
- List of Major League Baseball players with a home run in their final major league at bat
