= William Henry Steward =

American Civil Rights Activist

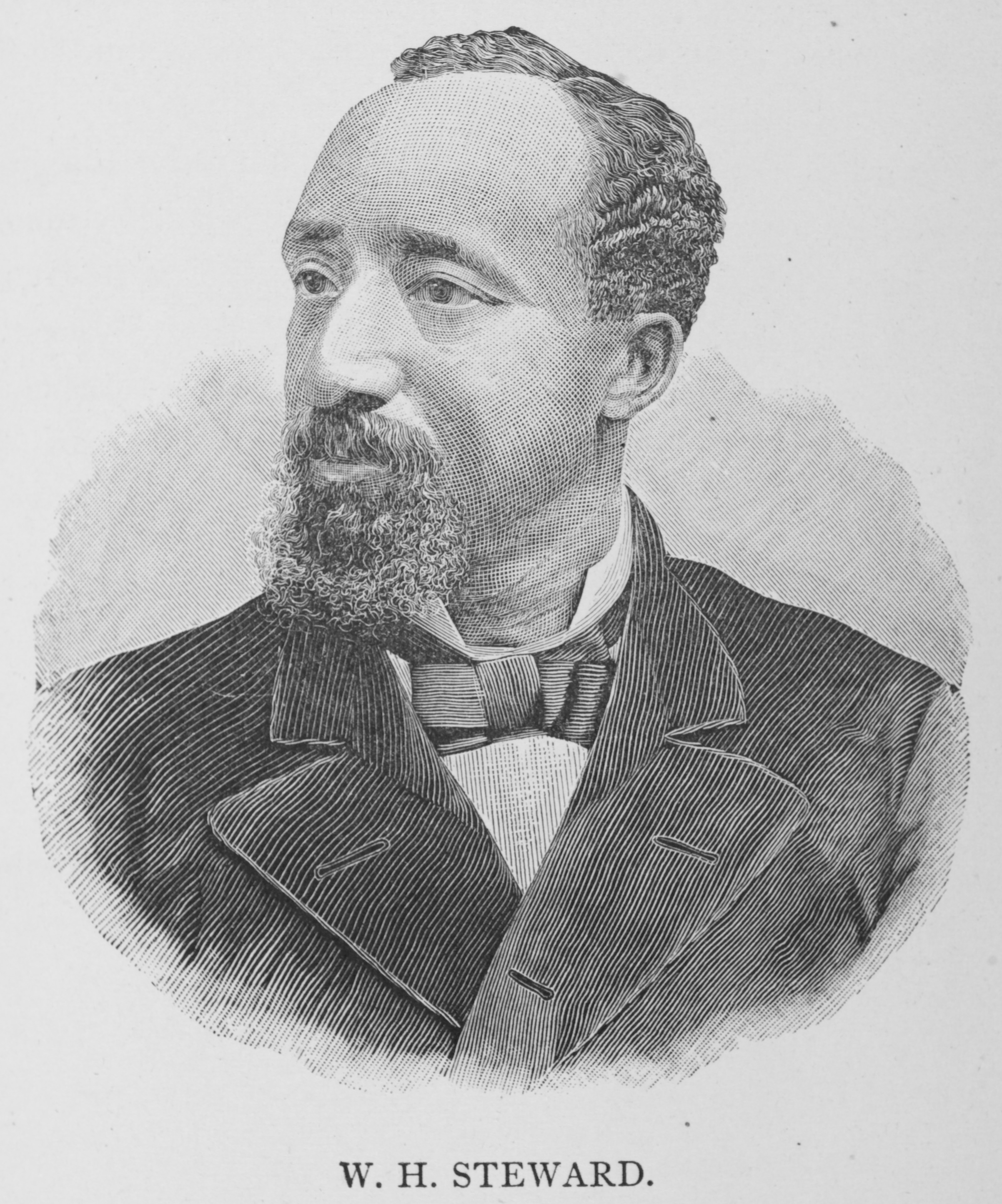
- Steward in 1887
- Born: July 26, 1847; Brandenburg, Kentucky
- Died: January 3, 1935 (aged 87); Louisville, Kentucky, United States
- Education: Shaw University
- Occupations: Educator, journalist,
- Political party: Republican

William Henry Steward (July 26, 1847 – January 3, 1935) was a civil rights activist from Louisville, Kentucky. In February 1876, he was appointed the first black letter carrier in Kentucky. He was the leading layman of the General Association of Negro Baptists in Kentucky and played a key role in the founding of Simmons College of Kentucky by the group in 1879. He continued to play an important role in the college during his life. He was also co-founder of the American Baptist, a journal associated with the group, and Steward went on to be the journal's editor. He was a leader in Louisville civic and public life, and played a role in extending educational opportunities in the city to black children. In 1897, his political associations led to his appointment as judge of registration and election for the Fifteenth Precinct of the Ninth Ward, overseeing voter registration for the election. This was the first appointment of an African American to such a position in Kentucky. He was elected president of the Afro-American Press Association in the 1890s He was a close associate of Booker T. Washington, and in the late 1890s and early 1900s, Steward was a prominent member of the National Afro-American Council, which was dominated by Washington. He was president of the council from 1904 to 1905. He was a lifelong opponent of segregation and was frequently involved in anti-Jim Crow law activities. In 1914 he helped found a Louisville branch of the National Association for the Advancement of Colored People (NAACP), which he left in 1920 to become a key player in the Commission on Interracial Cooperation (CIC). He was also a prominent freemason and twice elected Worshipful Master of the Grand Lodge of Kentucky.

== Early life ==
William Henry Steward was born a slave on July 26, 1847, in Brandenburg, Kentucky. He and his parents were light-skinned. At the age of nine, his master brought him to Louisville, Kentucky. He was allowed to attend school, and attended schools taught by Henry Adams, William H. Gibson, and R. T. W. James. run by the First African Baptist Church. As a young adult, he taught schools at Frankfort, Kentucky and Louisville, and for three years he taught at the Eastern Colored School. An uncle helped him find a job as laborer of the Louisville & Nashville Railroad, and he was promoted to messenger in 1875 for the cashier and purchasing agent of the Railroad. In 1867 he was Baptized into the Baptist Church and was an active member, leading the choir at the Fifth Street Baptist church in Louisville and teaching in the Sunday School.

== Early career ==
In February 1876, he left the railroad and became a letter-carrier in the Louisville post-office, becoming the first black letter-carrier in Kentucky. He was respected in this position and was elected to represent the state in the National Letter-Carrier's Association meeting in 1882 in Philadelphia. Steward was frequently involved in religious and secular conventions. In 1873, he was secretary of the Kentucky Baptist State convention in 1873, statistical secretary of that body in 1876, and secretary of the General Association of Colored Baptists of Kentucky from 1877 until after 1887. He was a member of the board of directors of the Louisville Orphans' Home, which he helped found in 1877.

In 1879, Steward was the leading layman of the General Association of Negro Baptists in Kentucky and played a key role in the founding of Simmons College of Kentucky, first called Kentucky Normal and Theological Institute and opened on November 25, 1879. Steward chose the location of the school on a 2 1/2-acre tract on Kentucky Street between Seventh and Eighth Streets in Louisville. For most of the rest of his life, Steward served as chairman of the board of trustees at Simmons College. He also was a music instructor at the school. Also in 1879 the journal, American Baptist, was created by Steward and the General Association and from that time Steward was associated with the paper. He served as city editor, associate editor, and then as editor and business manager.

In 1881, Steward joined the Masonic Fraternity. He became well respected in the group, and was made Worshipful Master of United Lodge No 12, High Priest of Enterprise Chapter no. 4, Eminent Commander of Cyrene Commandry No. 1, and was twice elected Worshipful Master of the Grand Lodge of Kentucky. He was associated with public schools in Louisville and promoted their growth and development, particularly in securing appointments for African American teachers. He also was a strong supporter of a black YMCA in the city which formed in 1892.

In 1893, he opposed African American teacher William T. Peyton's attempt to gain the principalship of Central High School. In part, the opposition was based on Peyton's ambition and disloyalty, as Peyton had denounced the Republican Party and joined the Democrats in an effort to gain a patronage based appointment to the position. Steward was successful, and three years later Peyton was dismissed from the school system. Steward felt that the Democrats were responsible for Jim Crow laws and much of the discrimination of blacks, and were opposed to Republican sponsored 13th, 14th and 15th Amendments increasing the civil rights of African Americans. Until the mid-1890s, Steward generally worked with white politicians of both parties. However, Steward's support for Republicanism played an important role in the 1897 victory of the Republican party in local elections. During the campaign, a black political organization called the Elliott Club named for recently deceased Robert Brown Elliott was formed, it was claimed, to sow dissent among black Republicans. Steward shared the suspicion and opposed the club and its effort to discredit Louisville Mayor George Davidson Todd. Steward gained Todd's ear, and had some influence over patronage appointments made by the mayor. Shortly after the meeting, Steward was appointed judge of registration and election for the Fifteenth Precinct of the Ninth Ward, overseeing voter registration for the election. This was the first appointment of an African American to such a position in Kentucky.

== National activities ==
Steward's role in the American Baptist greatly increased his national reputation. He was elected secretary of the National Baptist convention in St. Louis on August 25, 1886, and continued to hold officer positions at numerous later conventions. He was a delegate to the 1892 Republican National Convention in Minneapolis, where he supported Benjamin Harrison, who won the nomination but lost the election to Grover Cleveland. In the 1890s he was elected president of the national Afro-American Press Association. In 1896, as president of the group, Steward was active in supporting the candidacy for president of William McKinley.

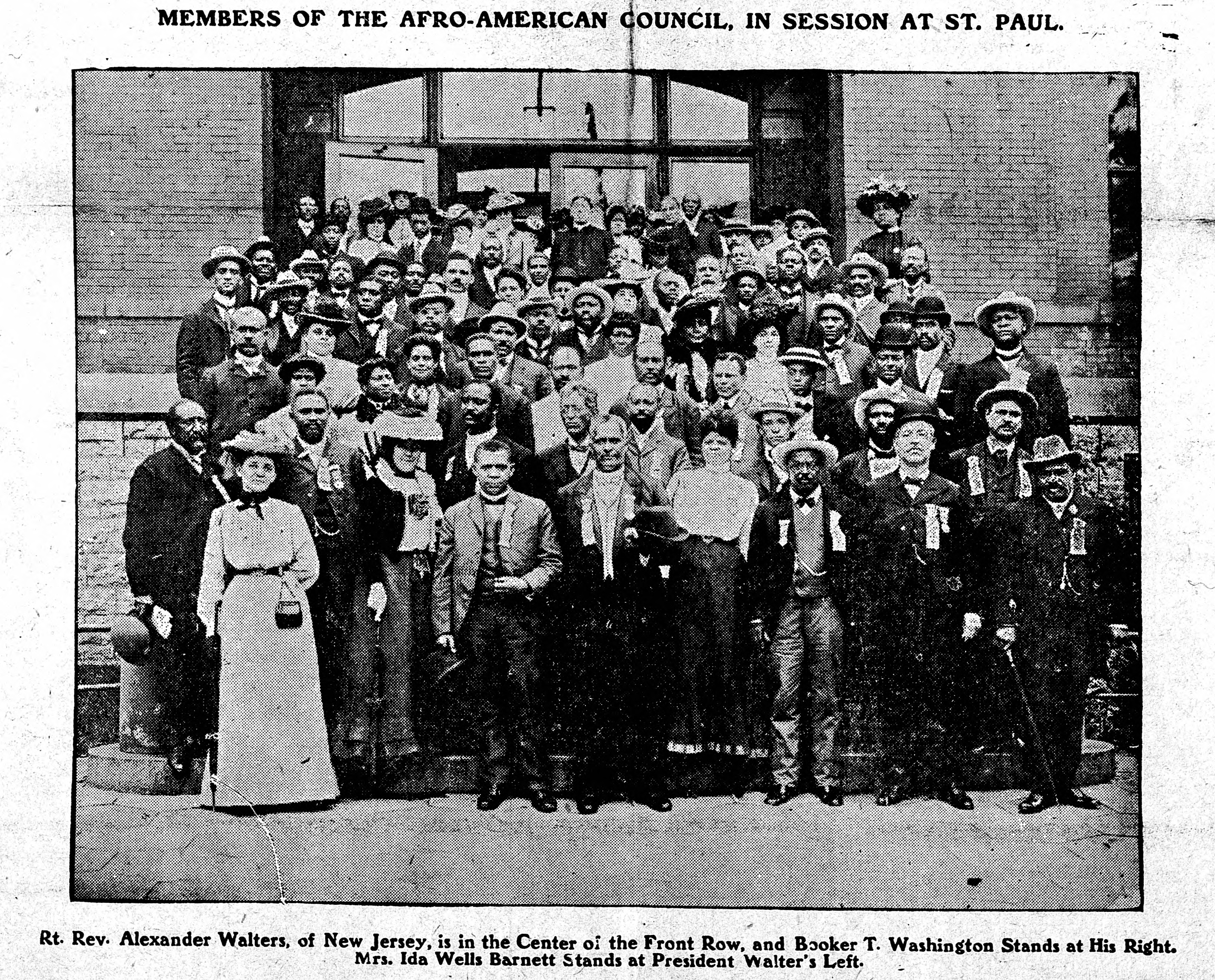
Afro-American Council at 1902 meeting in St. Paul, Minnesota.

As a leader in the community, Steward was consistently involved in issues of race relations. His methods were generally moderate, seeking to further African American interests without offending his white supporters. Even before Booker T. Washington became a national figure, Steward became associated with Washington; and as with Washington expressed a philosophy of racial self-help and of working with whites, even when white viewpoints were paternalistic. Like Washington, he frequently worked behind the scenes, and did so with Washington's help in 1904 in opposing a bill to disfranchise blacks in the Kentucky Legislature. In the late 1890s and early 1900s, Steward was a prominent member of the National Afro-American Council. He was president of the council from 1904 to 1905, following Journalist Timothy Thomas Fortune and preceding Bishop Alexander Walters in that position. The council was dominated by Washington and included a number of important leaders including W. E. B. Du Bois who went on to form the NAACP and anti-lynching activist Ida B. Wells.

== Later life in Louisville ==
In 1906, leading Louisville African Americans including Steward, Rev. Charles H. Parrish, and Rev. John H. Frank formed the Cave Dwellers Life Association, a life insurance company. In January 1910, Steward, school principal Albert E. Meyzeek, and Rev. Charles H. Parrish met with white Louisville streetcar officials and civic leaders regarding protests and boycotts of streetcars by blacks in response to a Jim Crow streetcar ordinance. Whites had called for the ban of blacks from the cars complaining that black men were sitting next to white women. Steward's efforts to calm the situation prevented three efforts to ban blacks between 1910 and 1918.

In 1914, a Louisville branch of the NAACP was founded by Steward, Parrish, and several other local ministers, continuing Steward's anti-segregation and pro-education work. In November 1917, Steward worked with the NAACP and other black leaders in litigation which went to the US Supreme Court where Louisville's Residential Segregation Ordinance was overturned. In 1920, Steward and Parrish were ousted from the executive board of the branch due to pressure from businessman Wilson Lovett over a bond issue. The pair left the NAACP and began working on the Commission on Interracial Cooperation (CIC). The group worked for similar goals, but frequently broke with the NAACP. For instance, when Louisville officials adopted an ordinance disallowing blacks from public parks in June 1924, the NAACP denounced the ordinance, while the CIC called for opening parks in black neighborhoods. When city officials soon after opened a new park with a swimming pool, the CIC praised the mayor and park commissioners, in-spite of the fact that other parks blacks lacked basic facilities and were simply vacant lots.

== Death, honors, and legacy ==
Later in his life, Shaw University gave Steward an honorary Master of Arts degree. In 1917, Alabama A&M University awarded Steward a LL. D. degree, a degree of doctor of laws. Steward died on January 3, 1935 in Louisville. His funeral was at Fifth Street Baptist Church. He was buried alongside his wife, Mamie E. Lee Steward in Louisville's Eastern Cemetery. In 1935, the University of Louisville acquired the four-story brick Simmons theological building of Simmons University and renovated it with classrooms. The school named it Steward Hall in honor of Steward.
