= Eastern Cemetery (Louisville) =

Cemetery in Kentucky, United States

Coordinates: 38.2465°N 85.7246°W

- Interactive map of Eastern Cemetery

Details
- Location: 641 Baxter Avenue, Louisville, Kentucky
- Size: 28 acres (11 ha)
- No. of graves: 16,000
- No. of interments: About 138,000

Eastern Cemetery is a 28-acre cemetery located at 641 Baxter Avenue in Louisville, Kentucky, United States, abutting Cave Hill Cemetery. It contains about 16,000 graves, though documentation for about 138,000 bodies. This imbalance is due to the cemetery formerly being a site for mass paupers' graves and from the reuse of grave sites.

== History ==
Originally known as The Methodist, the 28-acre Eastern Cemetery is located at 641 Baxter Avenue in Louisville, Kentucky, United States, abutting Cave Hill Cemetery. The grounds were purchased by two Methodist Episcopal churches and used for burials by 1844. It hosted Louisville's first crematoriums. Louisville Crematories and Cemetery Corporation owned the cemetery by the late 1980s.

By the mid-19th century, mass paupers' graves were used for burial in Eastern Cemetery. As of January 2017, the site has about 16,000 graves, and documentation for about 138,000 bodies. The pauper's graves contribute to the imbalance, but the public learned in 1989 that owners also had been reusing purchased grave sites. The property has fallen into disrepair since this news was brought to light, with neither Kentucky nor the original owners accepting ownership and financial responsibility for restorations. Louisville Crematories and Cemetery Corporation was dissolved, and its perpetual care fund lacks functional interest. Maintenance is currently provided by veterans, volunteer groups like the Friends of Eastern Cemetery, and Dismas Charities.

=== Mismanagement ===
In 1989, a whistleblower working for Louisville Crematories and Cemetery Company made the public aware that graves purchased by families had been reused. Bodies were buried atop other bodies, graves were carelessly excavated for reuse, and medical cadaver body parts from the University of Louisville were buried en masse rather than intact (as is legally required for donated bodies). Human bones were found in inappropriate areas, including in a tool box, a glove compartment, a fast food bag, and shallow graves. Some of the behavior had been practiced since the 1920s, and records indicate reuse began in 1858. Officials resigned and were charged with 60 counts of charges that included reuse of graves and abuse of corpses, but there were no legal consequences. The behavior is the subject of the 2017 documentary Facing East, referring to Eastern as "the most over-buried cemetery in America".

== People interred at Eastern Cemetery ==
- Henry Bidleman Bascom, (1796–1850), minister and former President of Transylvania University
- Hercules Burnett, (1865–1936), Baseball player
- Daniel Abraham Gaddie, (1836–1911), Baptist minister
- Valentine "Wall" Hatfield (1834–1890), participant in the Hatfield-McCoy Feud
- Arthur Samuel "Art" Payne, (1900–1965), bandleader, jazz musician and Gennett Records recording artist of the 1920s and 1930s
- Harvey C. Russell Sr. (1883–1949), African American educator, and academic administrator
- Felton Snow (1905–1974), Negro League Baseball player, buried in an unmarked grave
- William Henry Steward (1847–1935), journalist
- Bartlett Taylor (1815–1901), African Methodist Episcopal minister
- Philip Tomppert (1808–1873), Louisville mayor
- Amelia Tucker (1902–1987), first African-American woman to serve in the Kentucky General Assembly
