= Artishia Wilkerson Jordan =

American civic and religious leader (1901–1974)

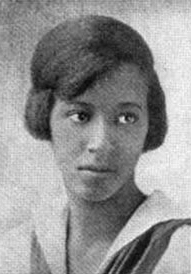
- Artishia Wilkerson Jordan as a student, from a 1923 publication.
- Born: Artishia Garcia Wilkerson; August 12, 1901; Louisville, Kentucky, US
- Died: February 7, 1974 (aged 72)
- Occupations: clubwoman, church leader, philanthropist
- Known for: scholarship funds and mission work
- Notable work: The African Methodist Episcopal Church in Africa (1964)

Artishia Garcia Wilkerson Jordan (August 12, 1901 – February 7, 1974) was an American educator and clubwoman, based in Los Angeles.

== Early life ==
Artishia Garcia Wilkerson was born in Louisville, Kentucky, the daughter of Bernard Orange Wilkerson and Artishia Garcia Gilbert Wilkerson. Her father was an attorney; her mother was a medical doctor, who died soon after childbirth in 1904. The younger Artishia earned degrees at Howard University (1922) and the University of Chicago (1923), and a master's degree in mathematics in 1924, from the University of California.

== Career ==
Jordan was a math teacher in Louisville as a young woman. She was president of the Los Angeles chapter of the National Council of Negro Women, and was active in Alpha Kappa Alpha, the NAACP, the Prince Hall Order of the Eastern Star, and the YWCA. She was on the editorial board of the Afro-American Women's Journal.

As a bishop's wife in the African Methodist Episcopal Church (AME), she held denominational and interdenominational positions of leadership, including a term as president of the Southern California Conference Branch. She organized the AME Ministers' Wives Alliance for Los Angeles spouses, the Interdenominational Ministers' Wives Council of Los Angeles, and served on the board of the Southern California Council of Church Women. She was director of the Los Angeles chapter of American Mission to Lepers. Jordan edited the Women's Missionary Recorder during World War II. She was active in the World Federation of Methodist Women, and as a speaker for the American Bible Society.

The Jordans traveled to South Africa several times in the 1950s, to visit churches there. Artishia Wilkerson Jordan wrote The African Methodist Episcopal Church in Africa (1964), based on their travels. As a member of the Our Authors Study Club, she led a successful campaign to install a plaque in memory of Biddy Mason at the Los Angeles County Museum, in 1957.

== Personal life ==
Artishia Wilkerson married Frederick Douglass Jordan in 1925. He became a bishop in the A. M. E. Church in 1952. She died in 1974; Frederick died in 1979. Frederick's parents were lawyer Dock J. Jordan and educator Carrie Thomas Jordan.

== Legacy ==
There are Artishia and Frederick Jordan Scholarship Funds at Howard University and Morris Brown College for "students who display academic excellence, a passion for community service and involvement in religious life". A building at Morris Brown College in Atlanta is named Jordan Hall for Artishia Wilkerson Jordan. There is an Artishia Wilkerson Jordan Women's Missionary Society based in Los Angeles, named in her memory.
