= List of colleges named Simmons =

Institutions of learning called Simmons College or Simmons University include:

- Simmons University, a women's liberal arts college in Boston, Massachusetts
- Simmons College of Kentucky, a historically black college in Louisville, Kentucky
- Hardin–Simmons University, in Abilene, Texas
