= Amelia Tucker =

American politician and minister (1902–1987)

Member of the Kentucky House of Representatives from the 40th district
- In office January 1, 1962 – January 1, 1964
- Preceded by: Edwin A. Rausch
- Succeeded by: Arthur L. Johnson

Personal details
- Born: Amelia Audrey Moore; 1902 Alabama, US
- Died: February 9, 1987 (aged 84–85) Los Angeles, California, US
- Party: Republican
- Education: Alabama State University, University of Louisville
- Occupation: Politician, minister

Amelia Audrey Moore Tucker (1902 – February 9, 1987) was an American politician and minister from the U.S. state of Kentucky. She was the first African-American woman elected to the Kentucky General Assembly, serving in the Kentucky House of Representatives from 1962 to 1964.

== Life and career ==
Tucker was born in Alabama in 1902 and attended Alabama State Teachers College and the University of Louisville. She moved to Louisville, Kentucky, with her husband, Charles Ewbank Tucker, in the 1920s. Her husband was bishop, and she was a minister, at the Brown Temple AMEZ Church. In the 1930s, her husband ran twice unsuccessfully on the Democratic ticket for the Kentucky House of Representatives.

Tucker was elected to the Kentucky House of Representatives in 1961 as a Republican, defeating a Black Democratic candidate to become the first Black woman to serve in the Kentucky General Assembly and the first to serve as a Southern state legislator since Reconstruction. She served one term. She fought to bar businesses from engaging in racial discrimination and enacted a law permitting municipalities to enact their own civil rights laws. She served on President Richard Nixon's advisory council on ethnic groups during the early 1970s. She also served on the Jefferson County Republican executive committee during the 1960s and 1970s.

== Personal life ==
After her husband's death in 1975, Tucker moved to Los Angeles, where she died on February 9, 1987, and was interred at Eastern Cemetery.
