= William J. Simmons (teacher) =

American journalist and educator

- Born: June 29, 1849; Charleston, South Carolina
- Died: October 30, 1890 (aged 41); Louisville, Kentucky
- Occupations: Baptist pastor, educator, activist, author
- Known for: President and namesake of Simmons College of Kentucky

William J. Simmons (June 29, 1849 – October 30, 1890) was an American Baptist pastor, educator, author, and activist. He was a former enslaved person who became the second president of Simmons College of Kentucky (1880–1890), for whom the school was later named.

Simmons greatly developed Howard University's teacher training programs when he took over the school. In addition, he was a writer, journalist, and educator. In 1886 he became president of the American National Baptist Convention, one of the organizations that would merge to form the National Baptist Convention, USA. He was elected president of the Colored Press Association for his work as editor of the American Baptist, a newspaper in Louisville, Kentucky. Simmons was also the author of Men of Mark (1877), an anthology of 177 short biographies of notable African American men.

== Early life and education ==
Rev. Dr. William J. Simmons was born into slavery in Charleston, South Carolina, to Edward and Esther Simmons on June 29, 1849. When Simmons was young, his mother fled slavery with her three children, William and his two sisters, Emeline and Anna.

They initially settled in Philadelphia, Pennsylvania, and were met by an uncle named Alexander Tardiff, who housed them, fed them and educated the children. Due to stemming pressures from slave traders, Tardiff relocated his extended family to Roxbury, Pennsylvania, Chester, Pennsylvania, before ultimately settling in Bordentown, New Jersey. Tardiff had received an education from Bishop Daniel Payne and undertook to give Simmons and his siblings an education on that basis.

== Career ==
=== American Civil War and Hillsdale School ===
From 1862 to 1864, Simmons served as an apprentice to a dentist. He served in the Union Army during the American Civil War, enlisting on September 15, 1864, and serving a one-year term. He took part in the siege of Petersburg, the Battle of Hatcher's Run, and the Battle of Appomattox Court House and was present at the surrender of Confederate General Robert E. Lee.

After the war, Simmons returned to dentistry. In 1867, he became a Baptist and joined a White Baptist church in Bordentown that was pastored by Reverend J. W. Custis. The congregation helped him through college. He attended Madison University (now Colgate University) and graduated in 1868. He later attended University of Rochester and Howard University, from which he earned a bachelor's degree in 1873. As a student, Simmons worked briefly at Hillsdale School in Washington D.C. At Hillsdale, he boarded with the poet Solomon G. Brown. After graduating, Simmons moved to Arkansas to become a teacher on the advice of Horace Greeley, but returned to Hillsdale soon after. He remained at Hillsdale until June 1874.

=== Howard Academy, Simmons College of Kentucky, and Eckstein Norton Institute ===
In the summer of 1875, Simmons married Josephine A. Silence on August 25, 1875, and moved to Ocala, Florida. The couple had seven children: Josephine Lavinia, William Johnson, Maud Marie, Amanda Moss, Mary Beatrice, John Thomas, and Gussie Lewis. In Florida, he invested in land to grow oranges, became principal of Howard Academy's teacher training program and served as the pastor of a church, deputy county clerk and county commissioner. He campaigned for the Republican Rutherford B. Hayes. He served there until 1879.

Simmons was ordained in 1879 and moved to Lexington, Kentucky, where he pastored the First Baptist Church. The following year, he became the second president of the Kentucky Normal and Theological Institute, which he worked for a decade. The school was eventually renamed the State University of Louisville, and later to Simmons College of Kentucky after Simmons due to schools progression under his tenure. In 1894, he was succeeded as Simmons College president by Charles L. Purce.

In 1890, Simmons and Charles H. Parrish founded the Eckstein Norton Institute in Bullitt County, Kentucky, a vocational school for African American students.

=== Politics and activism ===
In Kentucky, Simmons was elected for several years the chairman of the State Convention of Colored Men. On September 29, 1882, he was elected editor of the journal the American Baptist, in which he criticized the failures of both the Republican and Democratic parties to support black Americans in their fight for civil rights. He was also president of the American Baptist Company.

In 1886, Simmons was elected over T. Thomas Fortune as president of the Colored Press Association, having lost to W. A. Pledger the previous year. In 1883, Simmons organized the Baptist Women's Educational Convention, and in 1884, Blanche Bruce appointed Simmons commissioner for the state of Kentucky at the 1884 World's Fair in New Orleans. In 1886, he organized and was elected president of the American National Baptist Convention. The convention was a call for African American Baptist unity and was also led by Richard DeBaptiste and featured notable presentations by Solomon T. Clanton and James T. White. In 1889 in Indianapolis, Simmons was a leader at the American National Baptist Convention and wrote a resolution to provide aid for blacks fleeing violence in the South and moving to the North.

== Awards ==
Simmons received an honorary master's degree from Howard University in 1881 and an honorary doctorate degree from Wilberforce University in 1885.

In 1887, he published a book entitled Men of Mark: Eminent, Progressive and Rising, which highlights the lives of 172 prominent African American men, while serving as the school's president. He was working on a sister edition of the title that would highlight the lives and accomplishments of prominent pre-1900 African American women, but died before its completion.

== Death and legacy ==
Simmons died on October 30, 1890, in Louisville, Kentucky.

Starting in 1891, he was the namesake of the Simmons Colored School in The Ville neighborhood in St. Louis, Missouri.

== Bibliography ==
- Albert Witherspoon Pegues (1892). "William J. Simmons". Our Baptist Ministers and Schools. Willey & Company. pp. 439–.
- Rev William J. Simmons (1887). Men of Mark: Eminent, Progressive and Rising. G. M. Rewell & Company.
