= Prairieville Township, Pike County, Missouri =

Inactive township in the U.S. state of Missouri

Coordinates: 39.2661°N 91.0264°W

Prairieville Township is an inactive township in Pike County, in the U.S. state of Missouri.

Prairieville Township was erected in 1870, taking its name from the community of Prairieville, Missouri. Prairieville Township is also a high risk area for tornadoes, with an average of a tornado every year. There have been 85 tornadoes recorded in the township.

The town has low crime and unemployment rates. The town is also home to the Pike County Genealogical Society and Museum.
