= James Robinson Boise =

American classical scholar

- Born: January 27, 1815; Blandford, Massachusetts, US
- Died: February 9, 1895 (aged 80); Chicago, US

Academic background
- Education: Brown University

Academic work
- Discipline: Classics
- Institutions: Brown University; University of Michigan; University of Chicago; Baptist Union Theological Seminary
- Main interests: New Testament Greek

James Robinson Boise (January 27, 1815, Blandford, Massachusetts – February 9, 1895, Chicago) was an American classicist. He was the author of several Greek text books.

== Biography ==
He graduated from Brown University in 1840, and served there as tutor of Latin and Greek and as a professor of Greek until 1850. In 1852, he became a professor of Greek language and literature in the University of Michigan. In 1868, he was called to the same chair in the old University of Chicago. In 1877, he became professor of New Testament Interpretation in the Baptist Union Theological Seminary. On the establishment of the new University of Chicago, he was made professor emeritus of New Testament Greek. Robinson Boise was a strong supporter of women's education; his daughter Alice Robinson Boise Wood was the first woman to (informally) attend classes at the University of Michigan in 1866-7 and in 1872 became the first woman to graduate from the Old University of Chicago.

== Work ==
He published several classical text books, including editions with original notes of Xenophon's Anabasis and the first six books of Homer's Iliad, besides notes on the Epistles to the Galatians, Romans, etc. His texts on the Greek language included Greek Syntax and First Lessons in Greek.
