= Andrew Heath (minister) =

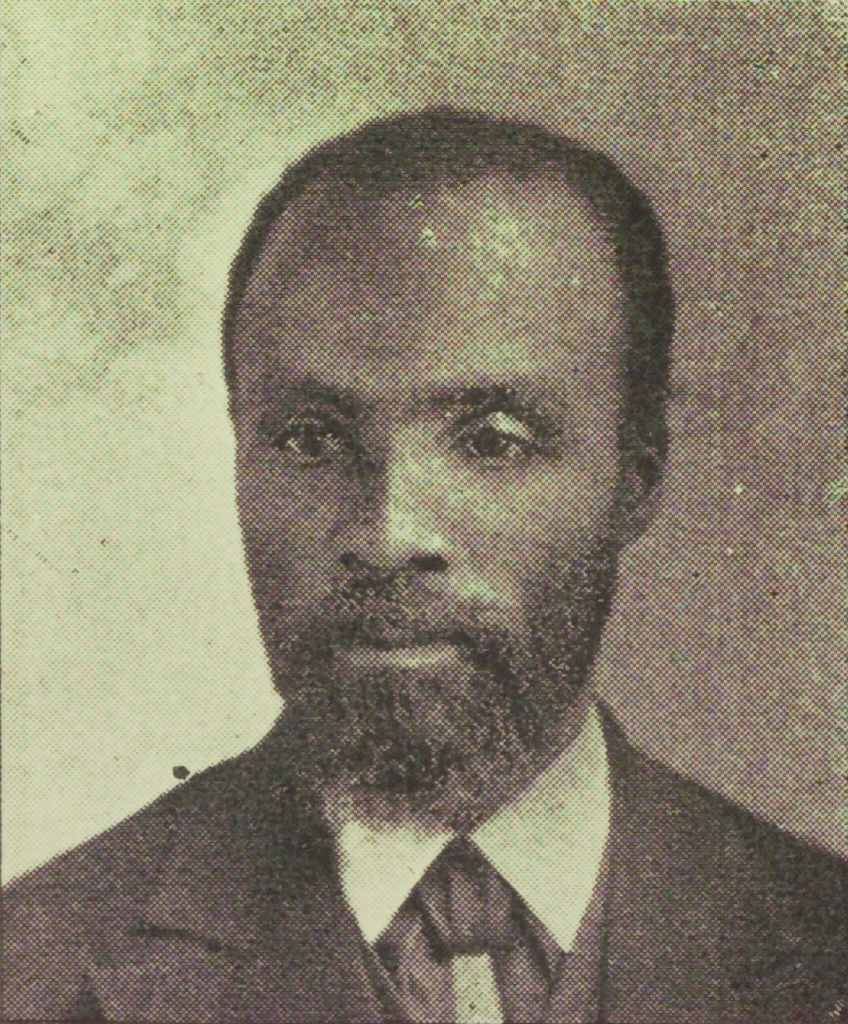
- Born: February 20, 1832; Henderson County, Kentucky
- Died: February 19, 1887 (aged 54); Louisville, Kentucky
- Occupation: Minister

Religious life
- Religion: Baptist

Andrew Heath (February 20, 1832 - February 19, 1887) was a Baptist minister in Louisville, Kentucky.

Andrew Heath was born in Henderson County, Kentucky on February 20, 1832. At his birth, he was a slave of a A. T. Heath. Heath was moved with his master in about 1844 to Louisville, Kentucky. In Louisville, he was sold to Samuel L. Nock, a merchant there, with whom he remained until emancipation in 1863. Heath then worked in the furniture business until his ordination. In 1851 he married Lucy Hamilton, and they had children.

In 1863 he was enrolled as a member of the Baptist church and in 1867 he was ordained a minister by a council which included Henry Adams and William Troy. In 1868, he became assistant pastor to Adams at Fifth Street Baptist church. In 1872, when Adams died, he became its pastor. He was widely respected and was said to baptize over 1,500 people. He served as a chairman and member of the executive board of the General Association of Colored Baptists. He died the morning of February 19, 1887 after a long illness.

Heath was followed at the Fifth Street Baptist Church by his assistant pastor, John H. Frank.
