= Solomon G. Brown =

American poet (1829–1906)

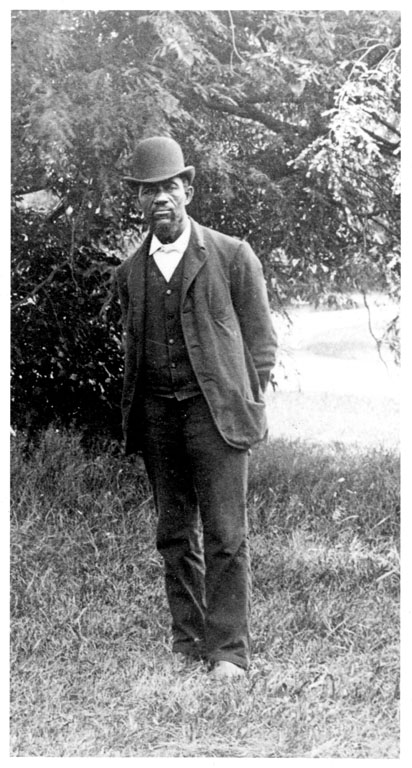
- Born: February 14, 1829; Washington, D.C., U.S.
- Died: June 26, 1906 (aged 77); Washington, D.C., U.S.
- Occupation: Scientist
- Political party: Republican

Solomon G. Brown (February 14, 1829 – June 26, 1906) was the first African-American employee of the Smithsonian Institution. He was also a poet, lecturer, and scientific technician. He joined the Smithsonian in 1852 and remained there for fifty-four years until he retired in 1906. He was also a local civic leader, organizing and leading many educational and community organizations. He served in the Washington D.C. House of Delegates from 1871 to 1874.

== Early life ==
Solomon Galleon Brown was born on February 14, 1829, in Washington, D.C., the fourth of six children to his parents Isaac and Rachel Brown. His parents were former slaves, but he was born a free man. His father died in 1832 and his family was left homeless with heavy debt. Brown was unable to be formally educated because he had to work in order to support his family. When he was fifteen, he worked at the Washington D.C. Post Office as a postmaster assistant, receiving his appointment from then assistant postmaster Lambert Tree. Part of his duties in 1844 and 1845 were to assist Joseph Henry, Samuel F. B. Morse, and Alfred Vail with the installation of the first Morse telegraph. When the Morse Telegraph Company was formed, Brown left the post office and for the next seven years he continued to work for Samuel Morse as battery tender. He then took a position as assistant packer at Gillman & Brothers manufacturing company in their chemical laboratory. His work at this time included working for the general land office and in bookbinding.

Beyond introducing Brown to Morse, Henry, Vail, and others, Tree was an important friend and mentor to Brown. Brown's status in Washington D.C. as a free black man in a slave society was not without stress, and on July 21, 1858, Brown obtained a certificate of freedom, in which he and Tree swore in front of a justice of the peace that Brown had always been free.

== Career with the Smithsonian Institution ==
In 1852 he was appointed to the foreign exchange division of the new Smithsonian Institution by his former boss at the Morse Telegraph Company, Joseph Henry, where he was hired as a general laborer. In 1864, he became a museum assistant and by 1869 he was the registrar in charge of transportation, registry, and the storage of animal specimens and materials received by the institution. Out of all the three secretaries that he worked with, he worked closely with Spencer Baird. Spencer Baird was a successful ornithologist and Brown spent a lot of time assisting him. When Baird was out of town, he trusted Brown to be the "eyes and ears" of the Smithsonian. Brown would do clerical duties for Baird, for example, he entertained visitors, opened and forwarded mail, made the Baird family's travel arrangements, and gave out wages to the workers of the Baird household.

During his career at the Smithsonian, he worked for the National Museum, the International Exchange Service, the Bureau of American Ethnology, and the National Zoological Park. He had many duties within the Smithsonian as a general laborer building exhibit cases, moving and cleaning furniture, drawing for both Smithsonian and personal lectures and assisting in preparing maps while becoming a supervisor at the Smithsonian. He worked under the first three Smithsonian secretaries, Joseph Henry, Spencer Fullerton Baird, and Samuel Pierpont Langley.

== Outside the Smithsonian ==
Brown was an activist who volunteered in civic and educational programs to help the African-American community. He was the founder of the Pioneer Sabbath School in Washington, D.C., and was also the superintendent of the North Washington Mission Sunday School. He helped organize the Pioneer Sunday School association in the Hillsdale neighborhood and was superintendent of the association from 1868 to 1888. Brown, along with Fred Smoot and Mark McKenzie were early settlers and civic leaders of the Hillsdale neighborhood, which was created on the land of the former Barry Farm under the supervision of the Freedmen's Bureau. He was a trustee of Wilberforce University, of the 15th Street Presbyterian church, and of the D.C. public schools. He was the superintendent of the North Washington Mission Sunday School and an active member of the Freedmen's Relief association. He was also commissioner of the poor in the County of Washington.

He was elected as president of the National Union League in 1866, which was a political organization in the south of the United States for African Americans. He served three terms as a Republican member of the House of Delegates for Washington, D.C., from 1871 to 1874. He represented all the people who lived in Anacostia. He was the first member to be certified by the governor of Washington D.C., Henry D. Cooke.

He was a member of numerous lyceums, including the Galbraith in D.C, and the St. Paul Lyceum in Baltimore, and gave frequent lectures on scientific questions in Baltimore, Alexandria, and Washington, D.C. His first lectures were in January 1855 and presided by Enoch Ambush, who later promoted Brown as a speaker, and Brown gave lectures over subjects from insects to geology to the telegraph. Brown created the diagrams used in the lectures, and in connection with these, he prepared or assisted in preparing nearly all the important diagrams for scientific lectures given at the Smithsonian during his tenure there.

He was an officer in the District Grand Lodge of Masons, and was an assistant honorary commissioner of the colored department of the 1884 New Orleans Exposition World's Fair for D.C. He was director of the Industrial Saving and Building Association of Washington, D.C. and the Washington correspondent of the Anglo-African Christian Recorder when it was edited by Bishop Henry McNeal Turner. He also edited the column, "Sunday school Circle" of the Christian Index, a publication from Jackson, Tennessee.

Brown was also part of the National Black Leadership Committee that arranged for the unveiling of Thomas Ball's sculptor Emancipation Memorial Monument in Washington's Lincoln Park. A large group attended the unveiling, including President Ulysses S. Grant and Frederick Douglass. Brown spent some time writing poetry, in which some appeared in the local African-American newspapers, such as, "The Washington Bee".

== Personal life ==
In his personal life, he was married to Lucinda on June 16, 1864. They did not have children themselves, but they did have a large family of nieces (some they adopted) and boarders, which included William J. Simmons. Together they would have picnics for their local community.

== Death and legacy ==
He retired on February 14, 1906, and died June 26, 1906, at his home. His funeral was officiated by Francis James Grimke, the pastor at the Fifteenth Street Presbyterian Church, where he was a member. His burial was at Harmony Cemetery.

In 2004, a few trees were planted around the National Museum of Natural History in his honor.

When the National Museum of African American History and Culture opened in 2016, it named its fifth-floor Council and conference lounge space the Solomon G. Brown Room.
