= Bartlett Taylor =

- Born: February 14, 1815; Henderson County, Kentucky
- Died: July 3, 1901 (aged 86); Louisville, Kentucky, United States
- Occupation: Minister
- Political party: Republican

Religious life
- Religion: African Methodist Episcopal Church

Bartlett Taylor (February 14, 1815 – July 3, 1901) was an African Methodist Episcopal Church minister in Louisville, Kentucky. He purchased his freedom from slavery in 1840 and became missionary for the states of Kentucky and Tennessee after the American Civil War (1861–1865), in which position he founded many churches.

== Early life ==
Bartlett Taylor was born a slave in Henderson County, Kentucky on February 14, 1815. His father was Jonathan Taylor, who was the master of him and his mother. Jonathan treated Bartlett and his mother well, but went into debt and had his slaves taken when Bartlett was about seven. Bartlett's mother, infant son, and four of her sons, Bartlett's half-brothers, were taken from the county and Bartlett never again saw his mother. At the age of nine, Bartlett and his sisters were moved to Oldham County, Kentucky to a farm six miles north of La Grange, Kentucky, and when Bartlett was twelve, he was purchased by his master's brother, but remained with his master where he stayed until he was nineteen. When one of his master's daughters married, Bartlett moved with them to Louisville. In Louisville, Taylor hired his time and learned to be a butcher. He was hired to a man named Clisindoff who was one of the largest beef merchants in the city. Taylor then endeavored to purchase his freedom, saving $1800. He told his owners he wished to purchase his freedom and was put for auction on September 20, 1840, at the La Grange court-house, where he would be given that chance. Before that date, he loaned his money to two friends, who failed to return the money. At the auction, Bartlett gave the highest bid, $2,000, although he had no money. The manager of the auction was in debt to the family of Taylor's master, and agreed to be responsible for Taylor's bid, and Taylor repaid him within the year.

== Family ==
A free man, he then married Jane McCune of Abingdon, Virginia. They had three daughters, but Jane died in 1846. He remarried in 1848 to Mariam A. McGill of Vincennes, Indiana. they had one son, Samuel Taylor who became a school teacher and later a principal at Main Street Colored School in Louisville.

== Career ==
He also enrolled in night schools and had many teachers, including Rev. Henry Adams, where he learned to read and write. He also continued working as a butcher and wholesaler of meat. He was very successful and made a lot of money, but lost it when he agreed to secure the debt of another man in 1858 who then could not pay. About this time, Taylor began to follow a career as a preacher and became a community leader. He was made treasurer of Wilberforce University in 1864 and held the position for several years.

In 1866, he was appointed by Bishop J. P. Campbell an itinerant preacher and missionary for Kentucky and Tennessee, and for the following two decades founded numerous churches, including one in Bowling Green, Kentucky in 1872 and another in 1874 in Cynthiana, Kentucky. He also opened churches in Pleasureville, Kentucky, Christiansburg, Virginia, and Louisville. He was involved in conventions of African Americans in Kentucky, serving as treasurer of the state convention of African Americans in 1867.

In 1881 he returned to Shelbyville, Kentucky where he was pastor and built a grade school. In 1884, he moved to Ashbury Chapel, Louisville where he raised money to rebuild a church which had been destroyed by fire. He was greatly respected for his work and he was a delegate to the numerous General Conference of the A. M. E. church.

== Death ==
Taylor died on July 3, 1901, in Louisville. His funeral was at Quinn Chapel and he was buried in the Eastern Cemetery on July 6.
