= Henry Adams (pastor) =

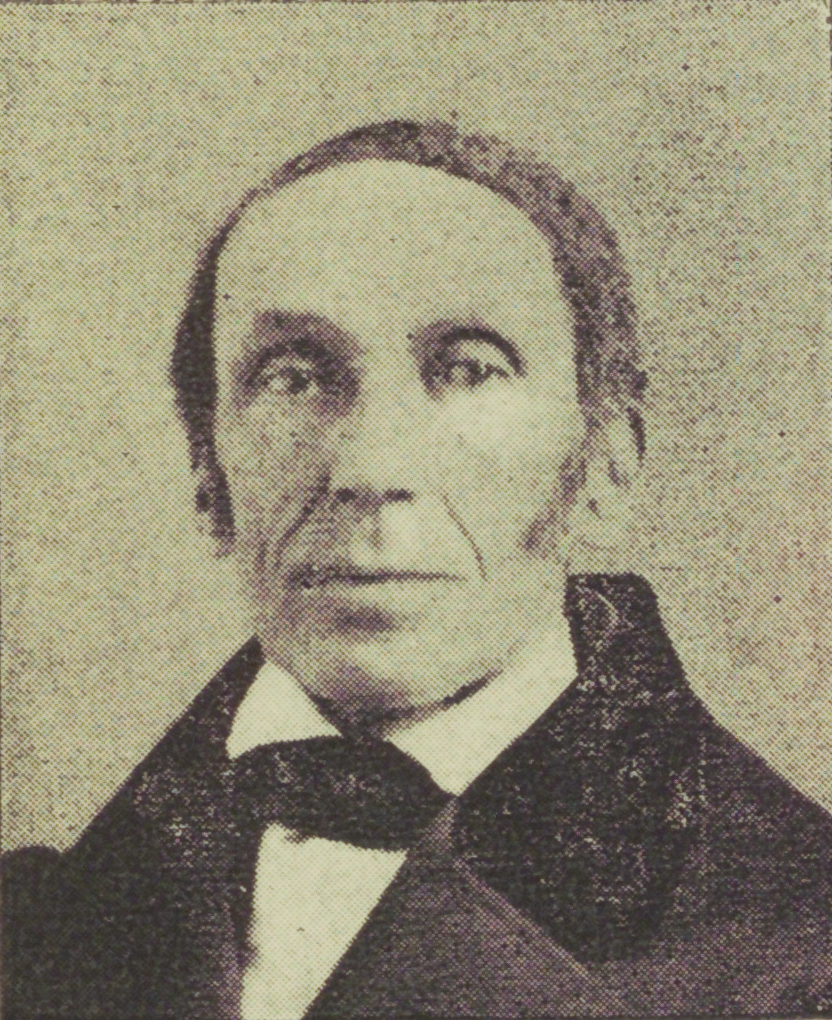
- Born: December 17, 1802; Franklin County, Georgia
- Died: November 3, 1872 (aged 69); Louisville, Kentucky
- Occupation: Minister
- Children: 5, including J.Q. Adams, and Cyrus Field Adams
- Relatives: Joseph Carter Corbin (brother in-law)

Henry Adams (December 17, 1802 – November 3, 1872) was a Baptist pastor and leader in the Black community in 19th-century Kentucky. He was born to free parents in Franklin County, Georgia, and became ordained at age 23. He preached throughout the Deep South before moving to Louisville, Kentucky, in 1829, where he became minister to Black members of First Baptist Church.

In 1842, his 45-member congregation eventually withdrew to form First African Baptist Church, which was later renamed Fifth Street Baptist Church. It was the second Black Baptist church in the state. He remained pastor of the congregation until his retirement in 1871. He ordained a number of prominent pastors during his term, including, Daniel Abraham Gaddie and Andrew Heath. Heath was also his assistant and successor at Fifth Street Baptist Church.

Adams was self-educated and became a respected biblical scholar, and led the black Baptist community in Louisville for decades. Adams stressed that church-related education and self-help were the keys to improvement of the situation of blacks in America. He organized black congregations during the Civil War and served as moderator of the General Association of Colored Baptists on August 3, 1869. He also taught night school, attended by many slaves and free blacks before and after emancipation, including William Henry Steward and Bartlett Taylor.

Later in life, he led a movement that culminated in the founding of the Kentucky Normal and Theological Institute (later Simmons College of Kentucky) in 1879.

He married Margaret Corbin, sister of Joseph Carter Corbin, in 1842 and they had five children. He died on November 3, 1872, due to a heart attack.
