= William H. Gibson (educator) =

Educator and community organizer in Louisville, Kentucky (1829–1906)

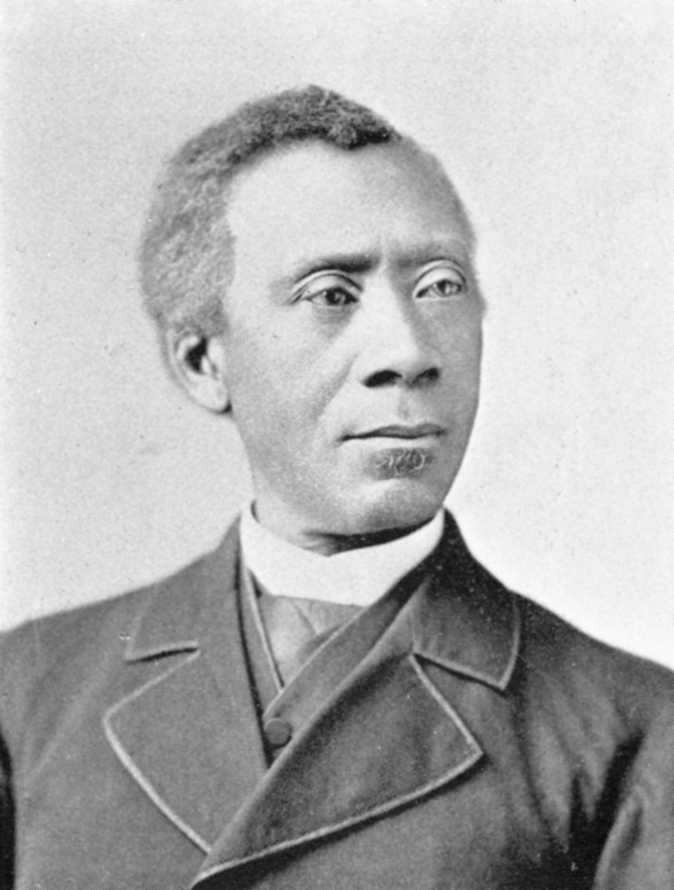
- Gibson in 1897
- Born: c. 1829; Baltimore, Maryland
- Died: June 2, 1906 (aged 76–77); Louisville, Kentucky, United States
- Occupations: Educator, civil servant
- Political party: Republican

William H. Gibson (c. 1829 – June 2, 1906) was an educator and community organizer in Louisville, Kentucky. He was one of the first African American teachers in that city, active before the Emancipation Proclamation. He was a civil servant after the American Civil War, and was subject to attacks by the Ku Klux Klan. In 1876 he founded the United Brothers of Friendship, a fraternal organization for African Americans.

== Early life ==
William H. Gibson was born in 1829 in Baltimore, Maryland to free blacks, Philip and Amelia Gibson. He learned to read by the age of five and attended a school taught by John Fortie. His parents wished that he could learn the printer's trade, but he was not allowed to, due to his race. He worked as a porter at the book store of the Lutheran Book Company and he continued his studies during that time. He took instruction in English and Latin from Daniel Payne. He also became passionate about music, taking classes from violinist James Anderson. He became a member of the Sharpe Street choir and musical associations. In 1847 he moved to Louisville, Kentucky with Robert Lane and James Harper and opened a day school, a night school, and a singing school in the basement of the Methodist church on Fourth and Green Streets. Many of the students were enslaved. Gibson played the violin, piano, and guitar, and taught them to others. In 1852, Gibson traveled to the Free Soil Convention in Pittsburgh, Pennsylvania, led by Frederick Douglass, William Harlan Garnett, Martin R. Delany, Henry Wilson, William Lloyd Garrison, and Thaddeus Stevens. He opened another school in the early 1850s on Seventh Street between Green and Jefferson, and in 1859 he opened a school at Quinn Chapel AME Church. This school temporarily closed in September 1862 together with other churches and schools due to the American Civil War.

== Career ==
=== Civil War ===
In the fall of 1862, Gibson and many other African Americans in Louisville joined the city's "spade and shovel brigade", making entrenchments to protect Louisville from an anticipated attack by General Braxton Bragg's Army in Kentucky. After a short time, Gibson moved to Indianapolis where he took charge of a Quaker supported school for former slaves there. In Indianapolis, Gibson worked with Dr. W. R. Revels and Sidney S. Hinton and others. In May 1863, he received a commission from Colonel Condee to recruit for the 55th Massachusetts Infantry Regiment. He first went to Louisville, but military authorities decided Kentucky recruits should not become soldiers in Massachusetts and Gibson was arrested and ordered to leave Kentucky. He then traveled through Indiana, recruiting particularly in Charlestown, New Albany, and Jeffersonville. In the spring of 1865, he went to Leavenworth, Kansas, at the call of John Turner where he taught a school supported by the American Missionary Society until the end of the war.

=== Louisville ===
After the war, Gibson returned to Louisville where he returned to his former school, now organized under the Freedmen's Bureau. In 1869 he was a delegate to the colored National Convention in Washington, D.C. In 1870 he became mail agent on the Knoxville branch of the Louisville & Nashville Railroad. After eight months he was transferred to the Lexington branch. On his second trip in the new post, he was attacked by the Ku Klux Klan in North Benson, Kentucky, between Frankfort and Lexington. His life was threatened and he was assigned a military guard. During this time he continued to teach until he resigned both positions in 1874 to become assistant cashier in the Freedmen's bank. He also received an appointment in the US Revenue Department as a gauger. In 1871, he was appointed a deputy of the United States Secret Service to secure witnesses in Frankfort, Kentucky, of the murder of Strader Trumbo by members of the Ku Klux Klan.

In the 1880s he was president of the Louisville Colored Musical Association. He was involved in freemasonry and taught Sunday Schools at Louisville Methodist Churches. He attended numerous state Republican Conventions and sought elected office several times, but was never successful. He was a co-founder of the United Brothers of Friendship based in Louisville in 1876 and served as its grand master. He was also a founder or leader of a number of Louisville culture organizations including the Mozart Society, the black YMCA, the Colored Orphans' Home, and the Louisville Colored Cemetery Company. He also was leader of the Quinn Chapel AME Church Choir for more than 35 years and occasionally composed songs for it and for other musical societies of which he was a part. He served several years as trustee of Wilberforce University. In 1883 he was elected president of the local Mutual Aid Association and served three years. In 1897 he wrote History of the United brothers of friendship and Sisters of the mysterious ten.

== Family and death ==
In July 1882, he married Jennie Lewis of Louisville. Gibson died June 2, 1906, at his home at 1522 Lexington Street in Louisville, Kentucky. His funeral was at Quinn Chapel. Gibson was buried in the Louisville Cemetery.

== Bibliography ==
- Gibson, William H. History of the United brothers of friendship and Sisters of the mysterious ten: in two parts; a Negro order; organized August 1, 1861, in the city of Louisville, Ky. Printed by the Bradley & Gilbert company, 1897. accessed October 21, 2016, at https://archive.org/stream/brofriendsismyst00gibsrich
