= Prairieville, Missouri =

Unincorporated community in Missouri, United States

Prairieville is an extinct town in Pike County, in the U.S. state of Missouri. The exact location of the town site is unknown to the GNIS. The town is near 39°16′15″N 91°00′09″W.

Prairieville was established in 1842, and was abandoned in 1992. The community was so named on account of its location upon the prairie.
