= Simmons College of Kentucky =

Historically black college in Louisville, Kentucky, US

Coordinates: 38°14′23″N 85°45′54″W

- Former name: State University at Louisville
- Motto: "Non Palma Sine Pulvere" (No Reward without Effort)
- Type: Private, HBCU
- Established: 1879
- President: Kevin Cosby
- Location: Louisville, Kentucky, United States
- Colors: Simmons red, gold and black
- Nickname: Falcons
- Sporting affiliations: NCCAA Division II – Mid-East
- Website: simmonscollegeky.edu
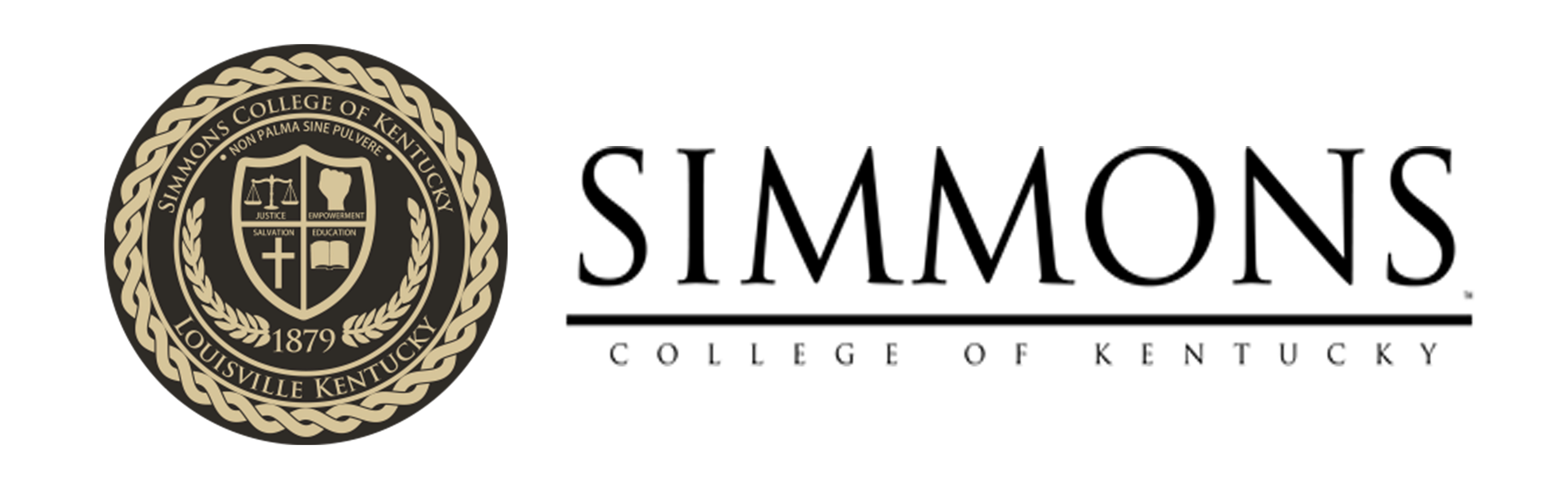

Simmons College of Kentucky, formerly known as Kentucky Normal Theological Institute, State University at Louisville, and later as Simmons Bible College, is a private, historically black college in Louisville, Kentucky. Founded in 1879, it is the nation's 107th HBCU and is accredited by the Association for Biblical Higher Education.

== History ==
=== Beginnings ===
In August 1865, 12 Black Baptist churches met at Fifth Street Baptist Church in Louisville and organized the State Convention of Colored Baptist Churches in Kentucky, led by the pastor Henry Adams.

Because there was no place in the state for Blacks to obtain a college education, members of the Convention soon began discussing the need to create a school for the training of Negroes, many of whom were one generation removed from slavery. Having first given consideration to Frankfort as the home to the school, members of the Convention instead decided in 1869 to locate what would be known as the Kentucky Normal Theological Institute in Louisville.

It was not until 1879, however, that any definite steps were taken for the opening of the school. In November of that year the trustees of the Convention of Colored Baptist Church in Kentucky purchased 4 acres (16,000 m^{2}) of land on the corner of 7th & Kentucky Street in Louisville that immediately served as the campus for the school.

=== Growth ===
Rev. Dr. William J. Simmons

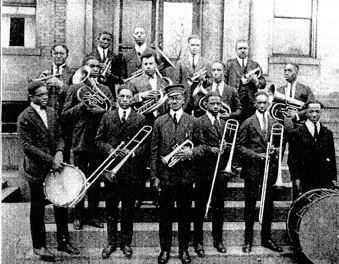
Photo of the 1922 Simmons College Band

That same year, the school opened its doors under the direction of its first president, Rev. Elijah P. Marrs. After a brief one-year tenure, Rev. Marrs was succeeded by Dr. William J. Simmons. Simmons was an ex-slave who had greatly developed Howard University's teacher training programs. It was under the leadership of Dr. Simmons that the school would begin to flourish in such a way that it would eventually be renamed "Simmons University" in appreciation for his contributions. By 1893 the school had 159 students, and by 1900 it was offering professional degrees in nursing and law in cooperation with the University of Louisville.

During his 10-year tenure (1880–1890), the school became a full university and expanded its offerings to include liberal arts, college preparatory courses and medical, law, business, music, and theological departments. Additionally, the school was the home to competitive football, basketball, and baseball teams.

Simmons University continued to grow and prosper. In 1894, Simmons was succeeded by Charles L. Purce, who was president until his death in 1905. In 1907, the school, now called "State University at Louisville" entered into an affiliation agreement with the Louisville National Medical College to merge the two colleges. From 1908 until 1916, Rev. William T. Amiger served as president. In 1918, L. Charles Parrish became president of the school and improved the school's endowment and academic offerings.

=== Decline ===
The effects of the Great Depression found their way to the school. In 1930, the university was forced to sell its property due to a foreclosure on the mortgage. As a result, the school significantly scaled back its offerings. The University of Louisville purchased the bulk of the property for the site of Louisville Municipal College, U of L's black branch under segregation. As part of the purchase agreement, Simmons agreed to offer only religious instruction. In 1934, the University of Louisville purchased the remainder of the property, and Simmons relocated to 18th and Dumesnil. In 1982 the school was renamed to "Simmons Bible College" to more adequately reflect its mission.

=== Renaissance ===
In 2005, Dr. Kevin Cosby became the 13th president and subsequently changed the name of the school to "Simmons College of Kentucky" to reflect the school's mission to prepare Christians for ministry, while reinstating its initial mission of general education. In 2006, the school bought and moved back to the original campus. As of 2025, Simmons College had an increasing student enrollment, numbering 508 total students.

== Academics ==
Simmons College of Kentucky has developed four distinct educational programs, plus a commitment to a fifth program objective, with a focus on an academic, research-based, faith-based approach to community involvement, interaction, and development.

Non-degree programs include a certificate and a diploma in Christian Ministry Studies. Degree programs include the Bachelor of Theology, Bachelor of Arts, and associate degree. Since 2018 the Baptist Seminary of Kentucky has offered a Master of Divinity degree that can be earned entirely through classes taken on the Simmons College campus.

Simmons had a medical school for a short time, but it closed in 1912 along with several predominantly black medical schools cited as "ineffectual" by the Flexner Report. The medical school was originally founded as the Louisville National Medical College, which merged with Simmons in 1907.

== Athletics ==
The Simmons athletic teams are called the Falcons. The college is a member of the Division II level of the National Christian Collegiate Athletic Association (NCCAA) within the Mid-East Region. Simmons competes in three intercollegiate varsity sports: men and women's basketball, golf, and track and field.

== Notable people ==
- Horace Signor Brannon (1884–1970) – Louisville-based physician who served in World War I; attended Louisville National Medical College which merged into Simmons
- Artishia Gilbert (1868–1904) – first African-American woman physician in Kentucky
- Arenia Mallory – educator and civil rights activist
- Samuel Plato (1882–1957) – architect
- Harvey C. Russell Sr. (1883–1949) – alumni of Simmons, educator, and academic administrator
- William J. Simmons – ex-slave who was the college's second president and namesake

== See also ==
- History of Louisville, Kentucky
