= Henry Lyman Morehouse =

American Baptist minister (1834–1917)

Henry Morehouse
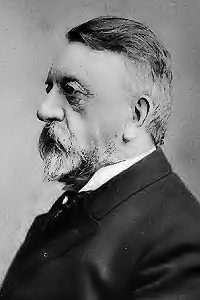
- Born: October 2, 1834; Stanford County, New York, US
- Died: May 5, 1917 (aged 82); New York, US
- Education: University of Rochester; Rochester Theological Seminary
- Occupations: Baptist preacher, hymns author
- Years active: 1864
- Honours: Morehouse College

Henry Lyman Morehouse (October 2, 1834 – May 5, 1917) was a Baptist minister, hymns author and member of the American Baptist Home Mission Society of New York.

Morehouse was born in 1834 in Stanford, New York. He joined the Baptist ministry in 1864 at the age of 30.

== Education and career ==
Morehouse attended the Genesee Wesleyan Seminary and the University of Rochester, New York from 1854 to 1858, then moved to Rochester Theological Seminary to study theology in 1861 to 1864. He became pastor at the East Saginaw church located in Michigan serving from 1864 to 1873, in the Park Avenue East Avenue Baptist Church Rochester, New York from 1873 to 1879 and he then in 1879 to 1888 served as the president of the Michigan Baptist State Convention together as secretary of the American Baptist Home Mission Society.

== Morehouse College ==
Morehouse College was founded in 1867 by William Jefferson White as Augusta Institute for educating black people on theology but was later renamed several times by the leaders at the boards.

The leadership of John Hope, who was the first African American president, renamed the college to Morehouse College in 1913 to honor Morehouse, who had donated funds to the college but had been a white northern-born prominent minister of American Baptist Home Mission Society of New York.

Morehouse died on May 5, 1917.

== Hymns authored ==
Morehouse authored several hymns including

- "Prayers, Means, and Men for Mexico," Examiner. Dr Morehouse H. L
- Led About, Zion's Advocate, 1887, Dr Morehouse H. L
- "No room in thy heart for the Savior of men, Examiner, Dr Morehouse H. L
- Friend of sinners, hear my plea" 'Pardon desired'. 1883, Good as Gold, Examiner, Dr. Morehouse H.L.
