= Georgia Baptist College =

Defunct American grade school and college

- Former name: Central City College (1899–1938)
- Type: Private HBCU
- Active: October 1899–1956
- Religious affiliation: Baptist
- Location: Macon, Georgia, United States
- Campus: 235 acres (95 ha)

Georgia Baptist College was a private grade school and college in Macon, Georgia, United States. It was founded in 1899 as Central City College and was renamed in 1938. It closed due to financial difficulties in 1956.

The idea for the school arose in the 1890s due to disagreements between some African American Baptists in the state and the American Baptist Home Mission Society (ABHMS), a Baptist organization that was affiliated with the Atlanta Baptist Seminary (now Morehouse College, a historically black college in Atlanta). They argued that Atlanta Baptist should have more African American representation in its leadership, and in 1899, Central City College was formed as an African American-led alternative to Atlanta Baptist, with the project spearheaded by noted Baptist preacher Emanuel K. Love of Savannah, Georgia. William E. Holmes, an instructor from Atlanta Baptist, served as its first president. The school functioned primarily as a primary and secondary school for its first few decades of operation, adding a college department in 1920. In 1921, a fire destroyed much of the school, though it was later rebuilt. The school struggled financially for much of its existence and in 1937, it went into foreclosure. The school continued on for several years after this, but finally closed in 1956.

== Background ==
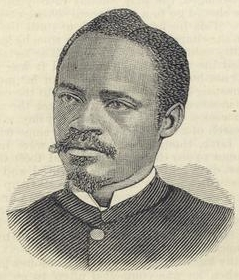
The Reverend Emanuel K. Love was instrumental in the formation of Central City College.

The idea for the school originated in the 1890s due to internal conflicts among African American Baptists in the U.S. state of Georgia. At the time, the American Baptist Home Mission Society (ABHMS), a New York City-based Baptist organization, was an influential group that supported several African American Baptist institutions throughout the state, including several institutions of higher learning such as the Atlanta Baptist Seminary. However, many African American Baptists were critical of the organization's leadership of these institutions, which were often led by white Americans. The Reverend Emanuel K. Love, a noted Baptist leader from Savannah, Georgia, was an outspoken advocate for more African American leadership in Baptist institutions and he had unsuccessfully sought positions on the board of trustees at both Atlanta Baptist and Spelman Seminary, another Baptist seminary located in Atlanta. Tensions were further inflamed in 1894 when Malcolm MacVicar, the white superintendent of education for the ABHMS, gave a speech where he said it would take a century before African Americans could be capable of managing their own churches and schools. In 1897, seeking to defuse the tension, the ABHMS agreed to work with African Americans to ensure increased representation on the colleges' boards of trustees. That same year, Atlanta Baptist was re-incorporated as a college, though African Americans were still largely excluded from leadership positions, a trend that would continue through 1899. That year, Love announced the formation of an African American Baptist college to rival the ABHMS-affiliated Atlanta Baptist.

Love, acting under the auspices of the Missionary Baptist Convention of Georgia (a statewide Baptist group that Love was the president of), acquired about 235 acres (95 ha) of land near Macon, Georgia to serve as the site of a new college. In September 1899, a representative of the school reached out to William E. Holmes, an African American faculty member from Atlanta Baptist, to offer him the position of president for this new college. Holmes had been the first African American faculty member at Atlanta Baptist and had worked there for over two decades at the time, and while he initially agreed to remain at Atlanta Baptist, he changed his mind and joined Love after then-Atlanta Baptist President George Sale asked him to publicly denounce the formation of the new school. Some time prior to this, Holmes had been involved in an effort to ouster Sale from his position as president, and Holmes's decision to accept the presidency at the new school may have been due in part to him being passed over for the presidency of Atlanta Baptist in favor of Sale in 1890. John Hope, a friend of Holmes's and fellow faculty member at Atlanta Baptist, opted to remain in Atlanta, where he was now the only African American faculty member. He would later become Atlanta Baptist's first African American president in 1906. Additionally, while there had been concerns that Holmes would recruit students from Atlanta Baptist to the new school, many opted to remain at Atlanta Baptist.

== Establishment ==
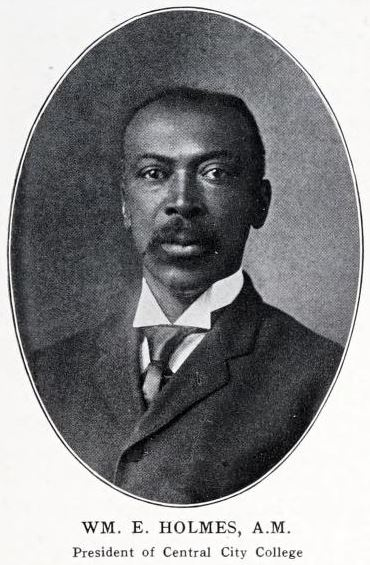
William E. Holmes served as the first president of Central City College.

The new school, named Central City College, was officially established in October 1899. It was part of a regional trend of independent Baptist colleges that formed around the late 1800s and early 1900s to serve African Americans in the American South, with similar institutions including Guadalupe College and Morris College. In its initial form, the institution functioned primarily as a grade school, with the school offering a primary school, high school, and a three-year theology program. The school was coeducational, although the theology program was only offered to men, and only a small number of students participated in it. From its beginning, the school attempted to follow the educational model found in the liberal arts colleges of New England, in opposition to the industrial education favored by noted African American leader Booker T. Washington. The primary school offered sources in geometry, grammar, history, mathematics, penmanship, and reading, while the high school courses included additional history courses, advanced mathematics, bookkeeping, physiology, physics, and language courses on English, Greek, and Latin. Only two faculty members held college degrees—Holmes and the Reverend James M. Nabrit, who also held a bachelor's degree from Atlanta Baptist.

== Early years ==
By the school's third year of operation, it had an enrollment of 365 students, and by 1908 it employed 11 teachers and enrolled 325 students. The school struggled financially for most of its existence, with one biography of the school by historian Willard Range stating that it "remained perpetually on the verge of bankruptcy and closure". By 1908, the school had an annual operating expense of about $4,000, while records from 1916 show that the school collected only $307 in school fees, equal to about $5 per student at the time. The school received some financial support from the Missionary Baptist Association to help it continue its operations, and additionally, the school farmed some of its large campus. By 1908, of the school's 325-acre (132 ha) campus, approximately 100 acres (40 ha) were used as farmland.

=== Office of Education report ===
In 1914, the school was visited by members of the United States Office of Education, who were collecting information on African American education in the United States. As part of their report, they recorded an enrollment of 40 primary school students and 25 high school students, though they stated that the number was usually larger in the winter months, taught by four full-time teachers and two volunteer teachers. They valued the school's assets, including the property, buildings, and materials, at about $16,000 and noted that the school was in $5,000 of debt due mostly to back pay and other general expenses. Assessing the state of education in Bibb County, Georgia as a whole, the report stated that, "The Central City College, a private school located in the suburbs, is of slight educational value to the community", and additionally recommended "[t]hat the plant be sold and the work transferred to some of the stronger Baptist schools of the State".

== Later years ==
In 1919, the school had 14 instructors. By the following year, the school officially began its college department, and the number of teachers had risen to eight. However, in May of the following year, Central City College's school buildings were destroyed in a fire. According to Holmes, the fire, which had been started by someone accused of insanity, destroyed most of the school's infrastructure, as well as "our Records and nearly everything else we had". In the aftermath of the destruction, community farmers sold some of their produce to raise money for the school's reconstruction, collecting about $164.34 for the school, while the Reverend T. J. Goodall (preacher at First African Baptist Church in Savannah and a board member of Central City College) personally donated $50 to the cause. For the fall semester that year, the school enrolled 204 students, with classes being held in tents set up on the campus. 161 students commuted, while the 43 who lived on campus stayed either in the president's house or in tents. Fundraising efforts continued through at least 1923.

Shortly before Christmas 1921, Holmes was visited at Central City College by Hope (who by this time was president of Atlanta Baptist, which had since been renamed to Morehouse College), E. C. Sage of the General Education Board (GEB, a private organization that supported schools for African Americans) and the Reverend M. W. Reddick (president of the Missionary Baptist Convention), who came to discuss the possible future of the school. While they stated that the school was "poorly managed, and educationally amounts to very little", they were interested in redeveloping the school as "a good secondary school, linked up with the Morehouse-Americus-Spelman system". (Note: "Americus" here references the Americus Institute, another African American educational institution in Georgia.) In 1924, Holmes retired as president of the school and was replaced by the Reverend J. H. Gadson, who had been an educator at a school in Rome, Georgia for about 18 years. Gadson requested support from the GEB to help fund Central City and even proposed a new direction for the school to focus more on industrial education at the high school level, though ultimately the GEB did not offer the school its financial support.

In late 1933, Gadson launched a large fundraising campaign for improvements to the school that would elevate it to the same level of prestige as Atlanta University, another African American educational institute in Atlanta. During a trip to New York City, he was able to secure donations from the National Baptist Convention, and he committed his entire year's salary of $1,800 to the fundraising efforts. Additional contributions came from members of the Macon community and statewide Baptist groups, and James H. Porter, a local industrialist and philanthropist who was the head of Central City's white advisory board, donated $5,000. However, just a few years later in 1937, the school went into foreclosure and came under the ownership of Porter, who placed the school under the control of the Georgia Baptist Missionary and Educational Convention. The next year, the school was renamed to Georgia Baptist College. The school continued to operate and promote fundraising efforts, including staging musical events before racially segregated audiences. During this time, noted theologian J. Deotis Roberts served on the school's faculty, and for one year he was the school's Dean of Religion. However, the school never fully recovered financially, and it finally closed in 1956.

== Legacy ==
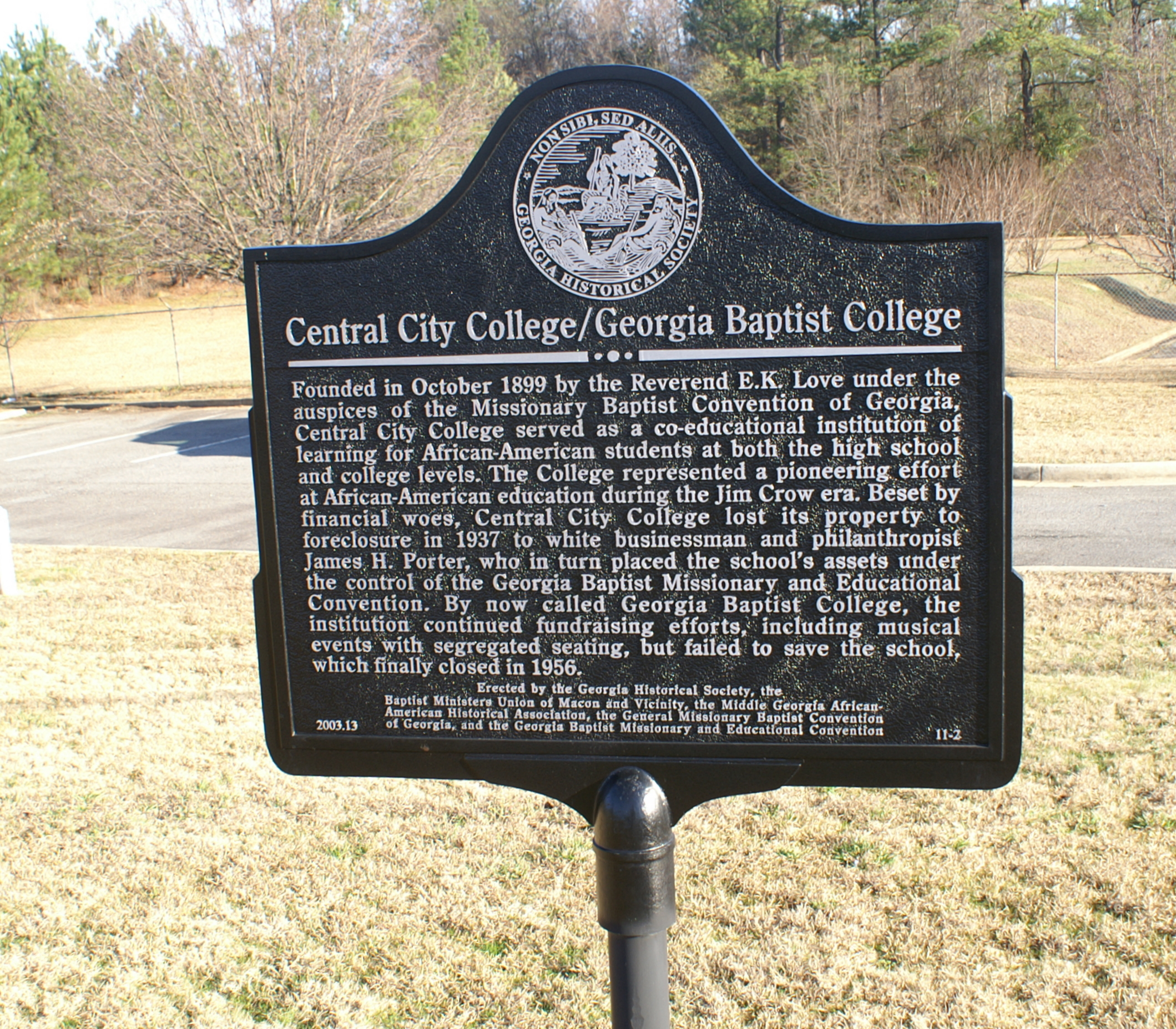
A Georgia historical marker for the school was erected in Macon in 2003.

In a 1975 book, historian James M. McPherson said the following regarding Central City College: "Hailed as a grand venture in self-help and independence, Central City College soon faded into a marginal secondary school and eventually collapsed". Range, in a 1951 book about historically black colleges and universities in Georgia, reflected on the school by saying it was created "in the spirit of antagonism" which left it "without universal sanction or support", which caused it "to fight for its existence" while "its work at higher learning remained a petty and pitiful affair". In 2003, the Georgia Historical Society erected a Georgia historical marker in Macon in honor of the school.

== See also ==
- List of historically black colleges and universities

== Sources ==
- Brackney, William H. (2008). Congregation and Campus: Baptists in Higher Education. Macon, Georgia: Mercer University Press. ISBN 978-0-88146-130-5.
- Butler, John Sibley (2005). Entrepreneurship and Self-Help among Black Americans: A Reconsideration of Race and Economics (Revised ed.). Albany, New York: State University of New York Press. ISBN 978-0-7914-8604-7.
- Davis, Leroy (1998). A Clashing of the Soul: John Hope and the Dilemma of African American Leadership and Black Higher Education in the Early Twentieth Century. Foreword by John Hope Franklin. Athens, Georgia: University of Georgia Press. ISBN 978-0-8203-1987-2.
- Eversley, Carlton A. G. (2010). "American Baptist Home Mission Society". In Lomotey, Kofi (ed.). Encyclopedia of African American Education. Vol. 1. Thousand Oaks, California: SAGE Publishing. pp. 43–44. ISBN 978-1-4129-4050-4.
- "Central City College/Georgia Baptist College". Georgia Historical Society. June 16, 2014 [2003]. Archived from the original on February 16, 2022.
- Goatley, David Emmanuel (2008). "J. Deotis Roberts (1927–): Theologian of African American Liberation Ethics". In McSwain, Larry L.; Allen, Wm. Loyd (eds.). Twentieth-Century Shapers of Baptist Social Ethics (First ed.). Macon, Georgia: Mercer University Press. pp. 120–136. ISBN 978-0-88146-100-8.
- Grant, Donald L. (1993). The Way It Was in the South: The Black Experience in Georgia. Edited with a foreword by Jonathan Grant. Athens, Georgia: University of Georgia Press. ISBN 978-0-8203-2329-9.
- Hartshorn, W. N.; Penniman, George W., eds. (1910). An Era of Progress and Promise, 1863–1910: The Religious, Moral, and Educational Development of the American Negro Since His Emancipation. Boston: The Priscilla Publishing Company. LCCN 10009507. OCLC 5343815.
- Herd-Clark, Dawn J. (2012). "Appendix: Profiles of Closed HBCUs". In Newkirk, Vann R. (ed.). New Life for Historically Black Colleges and Universities: A 21st Century Perspective. Jefferson, North Carolina: McFarland & Company. pp. 239–244. ISBN 978-0-7864-9099-8.
- Higginbotham, Evelyn Brooks (1993). Righteous Discontent: The Women's Movement in the Black Baptist Church, 1880–1920. Cambridge, Massachusetts: Harvard University Press. ISBN 978-0-674-76977-9.
- Manis, Andrew M. (2004). Macon Black and White: An Unutterable Separation in the American Century. Tubman African American Museum (First ed.). Macon, Georgia: Mercer University Press. ISBN 978-0-86554-958-6.
- McPherson, James M. (1975). The Abolitionist Legacy: From Reconstruction to the NAACP. Princeton, New Jersey: Princeton University Press. ISBN 978-0-691-10039-5.
- Monroe, Paul, ed. (1919). A Cyclopedia of Education. Vol. One. New York City: The MacMillan Company.
- Oltman, Adele (2008). Sacred Mission, Worldly Ambition: Black Christian Nationalism in the Age of Jim Crow. Athens, Georgia: University of Georgia Press. ISBN 978-0-8203-3661-9.
- Range, Willard (2009) [1951]. The Rise and Progress of Negro Colleges in Georgia, 1865–1949 (Paperback ed.). Athens, Georgia: University of Georgia Press. ISBN 978-0-8203-3452-3.
- Roberts, J. Deotis (2012). "Dignity and destiny: black reflections on eschatology". In Hopkins, Dwight N.; Antonio, Edward P. (eds.). The Cambridge Companion to Black Theology. Cambridge Companions. Cambridge: Cambridge University Press. pp. 211–220. ISBN 978-0-521-87986-6.
- Rouse, Jacqueline Anne (1989). Lugenia Burns Hope, Black Southern Reformer. Athens, Georgia: University of Georgia Press. ISBN 978-0-8203-2386-2.
- Negro Education: A Study of the Private and Higher Schools for Colored People in the United States. Vol. II. United States Office of Education. Washington, D.C.: United States Government Printing Office. 1917.
- Wagner, Clarence M. (1980). Profiles of Black Georgia Baptists. Atlanta: Bennett Brothers Printing Company.
