= William J. White (journalist) =

American journalist (1831–1913)

William Jefferson White
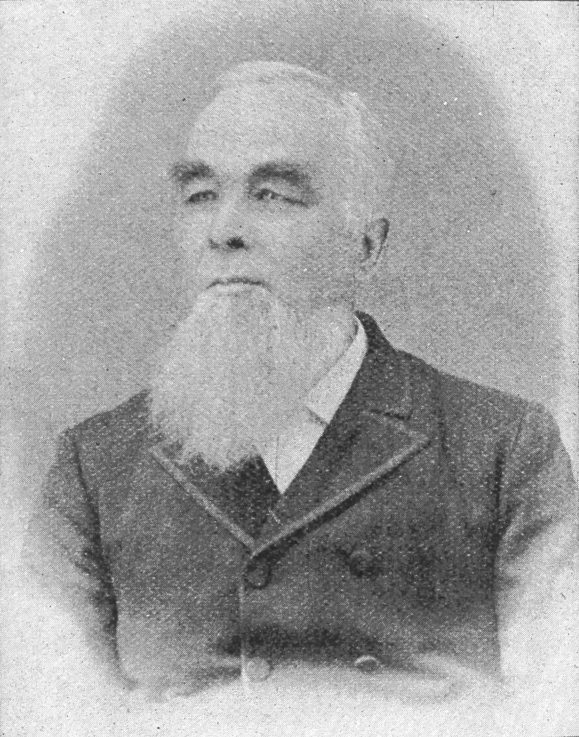
- White in 1892
- Born: December 25, 1831; Ruckersville, Georgia, U.S.
- Died: April 17, 1913 (aged 81); Augusta, Georgia, U.S.
- Other name: W.J. White
- Education: Augusta Institute, Simmons College of Kentucky
- Occupations: Minister, educator, journalist, activist
- Political party: Republican

Religious life
- Religion: Baptist

William Jefferson White (December 25, 1831 – April 17, 1913) was an American civil rights leader, minister, educator, and journalist. He was the founder of Harmony Baptist Church in Augusta, Georgia, in 1869, and of other churches. In 1867 he helped found the Augusta Institute, which became Morehouse College; he also helped found Atlanta University and was a trustee of both schools. He was a founder in 1880 and the managing editor of the Georgia Baptist, a leading African American newspaper for many years. He was an outspoken civil-rights leader.

== Early life ==
William Jefferson White was born at Ruckersville, Georgia, on December 25, 1831, to Chaney and William White. His father was white and his mother had African-American and Native American ancestors. He could pass for white and called himself black. Although his mother had been enslaved, he never was. He was taught to read by his mother. At the age of seven, he started working in a cotton factory, where he worked for three years. He also spent a short time working on a wagon traveling in rural parts of the state selling the factory's goods. In June, 1842, he went to Augusta, Georgia, where he lived with the family of Captain W. G. Nimmo and learned to write. He then took an apprenticeship as a carpenter for W. H. Goodrich, where he stayed for five years before moving on to cabinet making under C. A. Platt & Co., where he spent two years. He continued this work until 1867. During the American Civil War (1861–1865), the blockade denied printing supplies to Southern printers, and White learned to make printers' wooden furniture, which helped him in his later journalism career. He never formally attended college, but did take part in the courses at the Augusta Institute, which he helped found, and in 1889 was given an honorary degree of Doctor of Divinity by the State University of Kentucky.

== Career as an educator ==
Early in his career, White began teaching. In 1853, he opened a secret night school at the home of Samuel Ketch. In 1854, he started another school at the home of Deacon Anderson Hartwell, which remained open until the Hartwell family moved to Liberia. After that point, this school was taught on the premises of Judge W. T. Gould, without Gould's knowledge. Later in 1854, White opened a school at the home of the Reverend Peter Johnson.

White's secular educational career continued after the end of slavery. On January 12, 1867, White was appointed an educational agent of the Freedmen's Bureau, by Oliver O. Howard, and organized schools for black children in Georgia. He fought against illegal curfews for blacks and helped register blacks to vote. He organized educational societies and worked to get land and build schools. White left the Bureau on January 1, 1869, and on May 1 of that year was appointed assistant assessor of revenue by Edwin Belcher. He continued to work for the Internal Revenue Service in different roles until January 1, 1880, when he resigned to give his full attention to his religious callings. Also in 1869, he was also made a trustee of the newly established Atlanta University. White established the Augusta Institute in Springfield Baptist Church in 1867 and served as one of the trustees there. White was among those involved in the moving of the Augusta Institute to Atlanta and the change of name to the Atlanta Baptist Seminary, and continued to serve on the board of trustees. He was a longtime supporter of Ware High School, for blacks in Augusta, and was deeply hurt when the Richmond County Board of Education closed the school in 1897 to reapportion money for white elementary education. He was also a co-founder and trustee at the Spelman Seminary, which was formed in 1882.

== Ministry ==
White was baptized on October 7, 1855, at Springfield Baptist Church in Augusta, Georgia, on September 19, 1858, he was licensed to exhort, and on February 16, 1862, he was licensed to preach. He organized a Sabbath School on January 8, 1859, and he would serve as superintendent of the school for nine years. On April 1, 1866, he was ordained, and he began holding meetings on June 16, 1867, in what was known as McKinley's grove on a farm owned by Mary Bouyer McKinley and presided by Rev. George Barnes. On May 10, 1868, White and six others organized the Harmony Baptist Church on a lot next to McKinley's grove which they had bought from Mary McKinley. On the first Sunday of July, 1869, he officially became pastor of Harmony Baptist Church, a church whose congregation had grown in part out of the Sabbath schools he led. White also organized Watery Branch Baptist Church and Simonia Baptist Church elsewhere in Columbia County When the Missionary Baptist Convention of Georgia was formed in August 1870, he was elected treasurer, a position he held for fourteen years. He also served as missionary agent for the body.

White was involved in a number of other Baptist organizations. He served as treasurer of the Shiloh Association from its founding in 1870 until after 1892, and was co-founder and then president of the Colored Georgia Baptist Sunday School Convention for many years starting in 1872. He was a corresponding secretary of the Missionary baptist Convention and of the Sunday School Convention of Georgia, and chairman of the Baptist Centennial Committee of Georgia.

== Journalism career ==
White was involved in printing and journalism as soon as the Civil War ended in 1865. He was an important contributor to the work of John T. Shuften Sr. in producing The Colored American and was secretary of the Lohal Georgian Printing Company, which produced the paper and its successor, The Loyal Georgian. He contributed to these papers and to a white Republican owned paper, the Georgia Republican all of which were based in Augusta. He also worked for several years as the Augusta correspondent of the Atlanta Republican.

In 1880, White accepted the "Spurgeon Mission" of the American Baptist Publication Society, which he held for one year. Starting in May 1880 he was a part of a movement by the Missionary Baptist Convention of Georgia to create a newspaper. White was selected to edit and manage the paper, and put up $1000 of his own money as a part of the investment of $15,000 for a printing office, and on October 28, 1880, the first edition of the Georgia Baptist was produced. The paper was very successful and became the largest printing office exclusively owned by blacks in the country, producing both the newspaper and pamphlets.

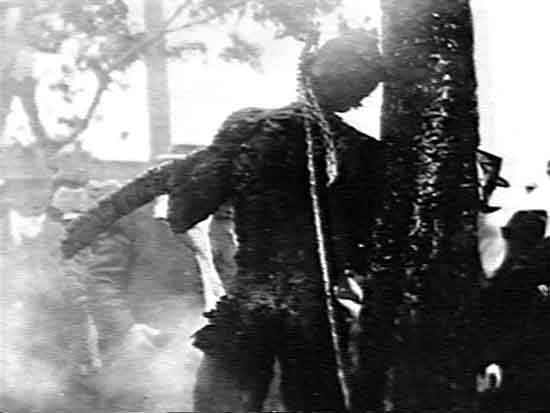
The public lynching of Sam Hose in 1899.

White's positions put him at odds with many other leading African Americans. In the 1880s, Richard R. Wright opposed White's support for the Colored Conventions Movement as Wright was concerned the movement put too much attention on race. Later, both became allies with Booker T. Washington. He also occasionally disputed with Charles T. Walker. He became associated with a faction of Baptists which advocated splitting white and black leadership of the church, a group which was led by White protege, Emanuel K. Love, in 1887. This put him at odds with other important leaders, including William E. Holmes. In 1899, White was especially active in speaking out against the lynching of seven men in Palmetto, Georgia, which killed five of the seven, and again later in the year of the Sam Hose (or Holt or Wilkes) lynching in nearby Newnan, Georgia. White's life was threatened by a mob in 1900 for his anti-lynching writings, and he was forced to repudiate and apologize for an anti-lynching article he wrote.

White's support for the convention movement redoubled after the Niagara Movement, and in 1906 he organized the Georgia Equal Rights Convention which brought together leaders such as John Hope, W. E. B. Du Bois, Bishop Henry McNeil Turner, Judson Lyons, J. Max Barber, A. D. Williams and many others. The organization was very vocal and wide reaching in its calls, advocating an end to Jim Crow cars on railroads, allowing African Americans to join the Georgia militia and serve on juries, better educational facilities for blacks, a more just judicial system, opposition to disfranchisement attempts, and many others. White, who was a conservative, delivered the presidential address, but anti-Booker T. Washington leader Du Boise delivered the keynote speech.

In September 1906, the White wrote in the Georgia Baptist against the rioters involved in the Atlanta Riots. As a result, hostile whites threatened to burn down his printing office and home and kill him if he did not leave the city. White and his friend, George Sale, went to the mayor of Augusta to ask for protection. The mayor promised to try, but recommended White to leave the city, and White fled. White had nearly been lynched in 1900 and 1901, and fled to South Carolina until October. When he returned to Augusta, his tone turned against anti-lynching leaders such as William J. Northen, calling for inter-racial cooperation.

== Personal life and death ==
He married Josephine in 1856, Josephine died in 1903.

White's son, Lucian Hayden White, became associate editor and assistant business manager at the paper.

White died April 17, 1913, in Augusta.

== Sources ==
- Davis, Leroy. A clashing of the soul: John Hope and the dilemma of African American leadership and Black higher education in the early twentieth century. University of Georgia Press, 1998.
