= Henry A. Rucker =

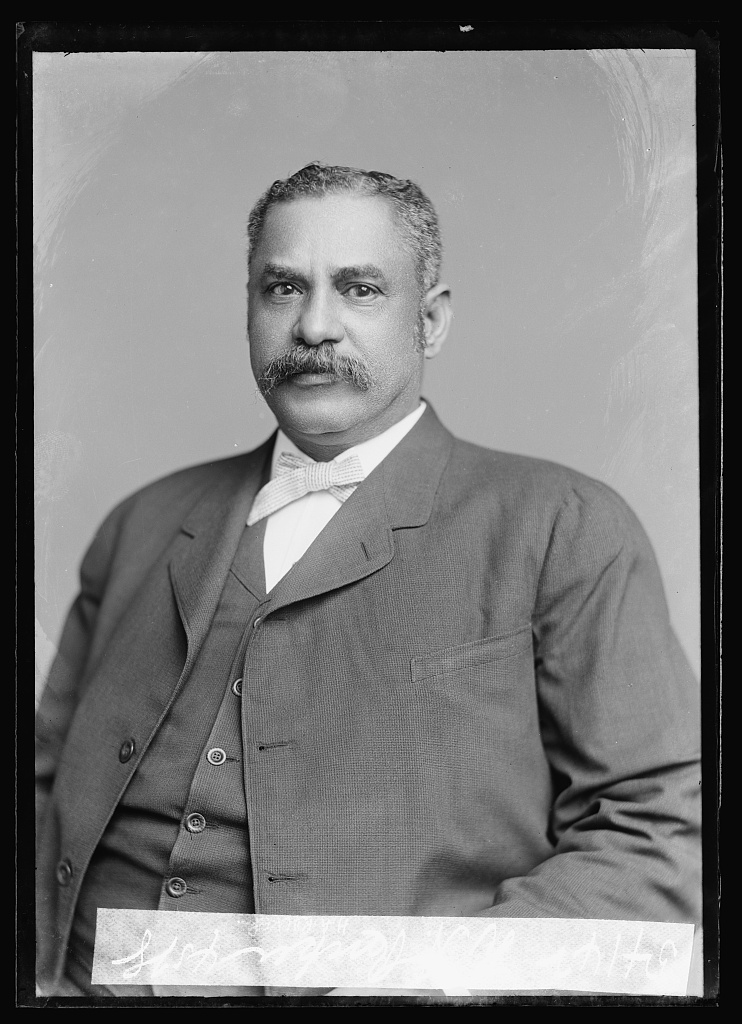
Henry A. Rucker by C. M. Bell Studio

Henry Allen Rucker (November 14, 1852—May 11, 1924) was an African American entrepreneur and politician. Born into slavery, he was able to achieve significant wealth and political power within the Republican Party. From 1897 to 1911 — the administrations of McKinley, Roosevelt, and Taft, all Republicans — he was the appointed head of federal tax collections for the state of Georgia. Despite serving at the nadir of race relations in Atlanta, Rucker was one of the three most powerful Black politicians in Georgia, alongside Judson Whitlocke Lyons and John H. Deveaux, characterized as the "big three" by rival Benjamin Jefferson Davis Sr.

== Early life ==
Rucker was born on November 14, 1852, the seventh of fourteen children, in Washington, Georgia. He and his parents were enslaved to Dr. William King; Rucker's father was a plasterer and his mother, Betsey (Bessie) Rucker, had some limited autonomy in the household. His mother was credited with offering Rucker council and guidance in his youth. The family moved to Kensington, Georgia, after the owner died. She supervised the children and invalid husband and moved the family to Atlanta after the Civil War. Henry Rucker was educated at Storrs School and worked a series of odd jobs before purchasing a house and a barber shop. He continued his studies at the Storrs Night School and Atlanta University Academy. After dropping out as a sophomore, Rucker joined Jackson McHenry in one of Atlanta's black militia companies in the 1870s. Rucker taught in Atlanta public schools before entering politics in 1880.

== Political career ==
Rucker worked for the federal government in several positions, including storekeeper, route agent, deputy collector, and liquor gauger. His barbershop became a haven for white politicians, and he advised them on who could fill certain positions.

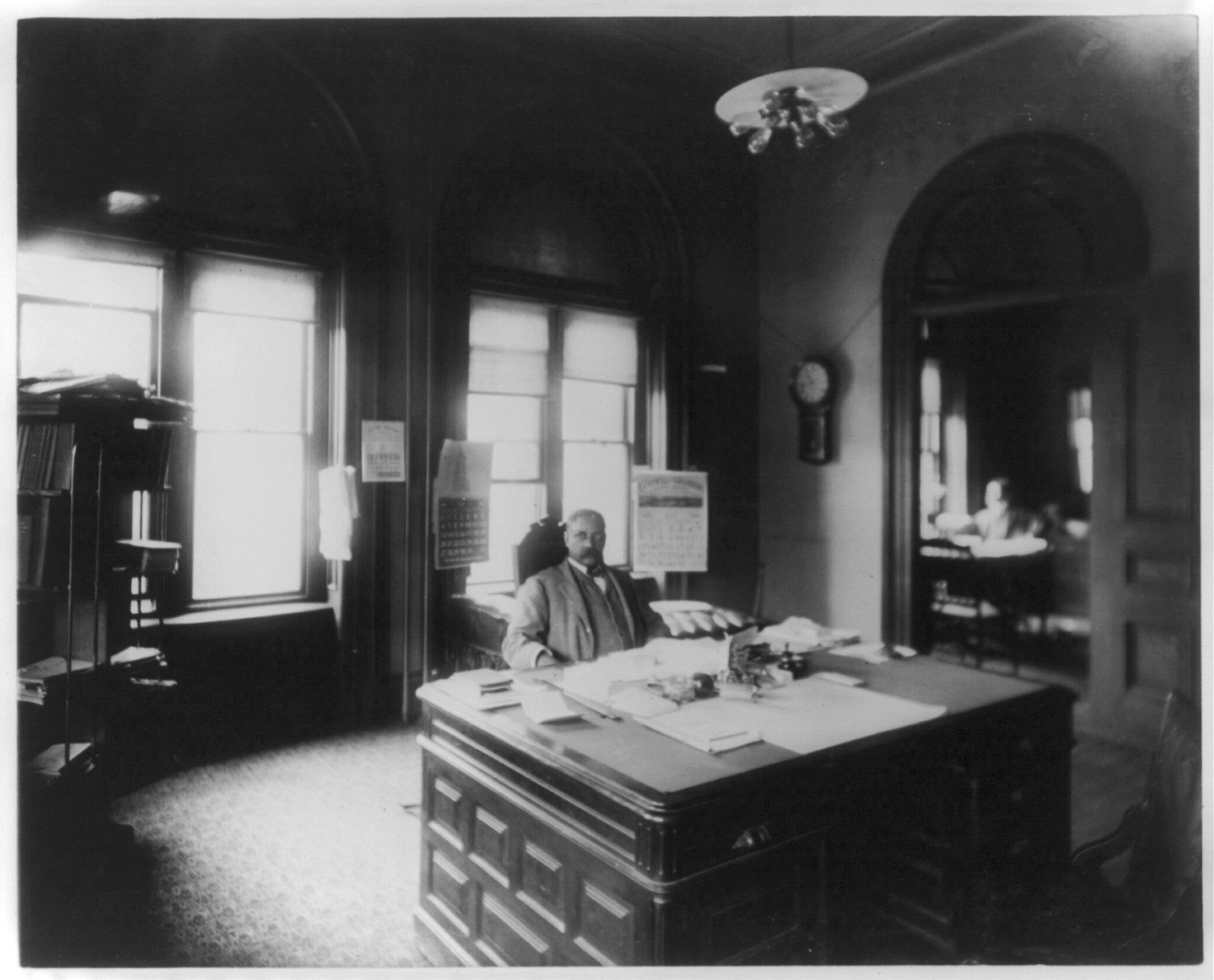
Henry A. Rucker seated at large desk in his office

From his business activity came enough capital to secure leadership in the Georgia Real Estate Loan and Trust Company. Rucker supported black liquor opportunities and opposed prohibition. By 1880, he was appointed a delegate to the Republican National Convention. He and several of his colleagues in the educated black middle class began pressing the federal government for more patronage positions for African Americans, since they formed the majority of the Republican base in Georgia. Even though the white Republican Party had split off for several years, Rucker and other black leaders pushed for African American concerns before a reconciliation between the two halves of the party. He supported a memorandum that improved streets in black neighborhoods and increased public school enrollment. President Grover Cleveland dismissed Rucker as federal clerk in the 1880s and again in 1893, but he was quickly becoming an important player in Georgia politics.

Rucker was a delegate at the 1896 Republican National Convention and was a vocal supporter of William McKinley, since he was, according to Rucker, in favor of "free and well-paid labor in the South" and "provided the colored man with an incentive to work and ameliorate his condition." In 1897, the banker James W. English recommended Rucker for the head of revenue collection despite protests from some whites who wanted to end patronage positions for blacks. McKinley appointed him to the position with an annual income of $4500. As head of revenue collection, Rucker gained access to the structure of a political process that encouraged personal privilege. He helped T. A. Jackson become principal of the Mitchell Street School and appointed two black men to Internal Revenue positions vacated by whites in protest of his nomination. In 1889, Rucker fired a black elevator conductor for abusing his role, frequently jerking the lever and insulting the clientele.

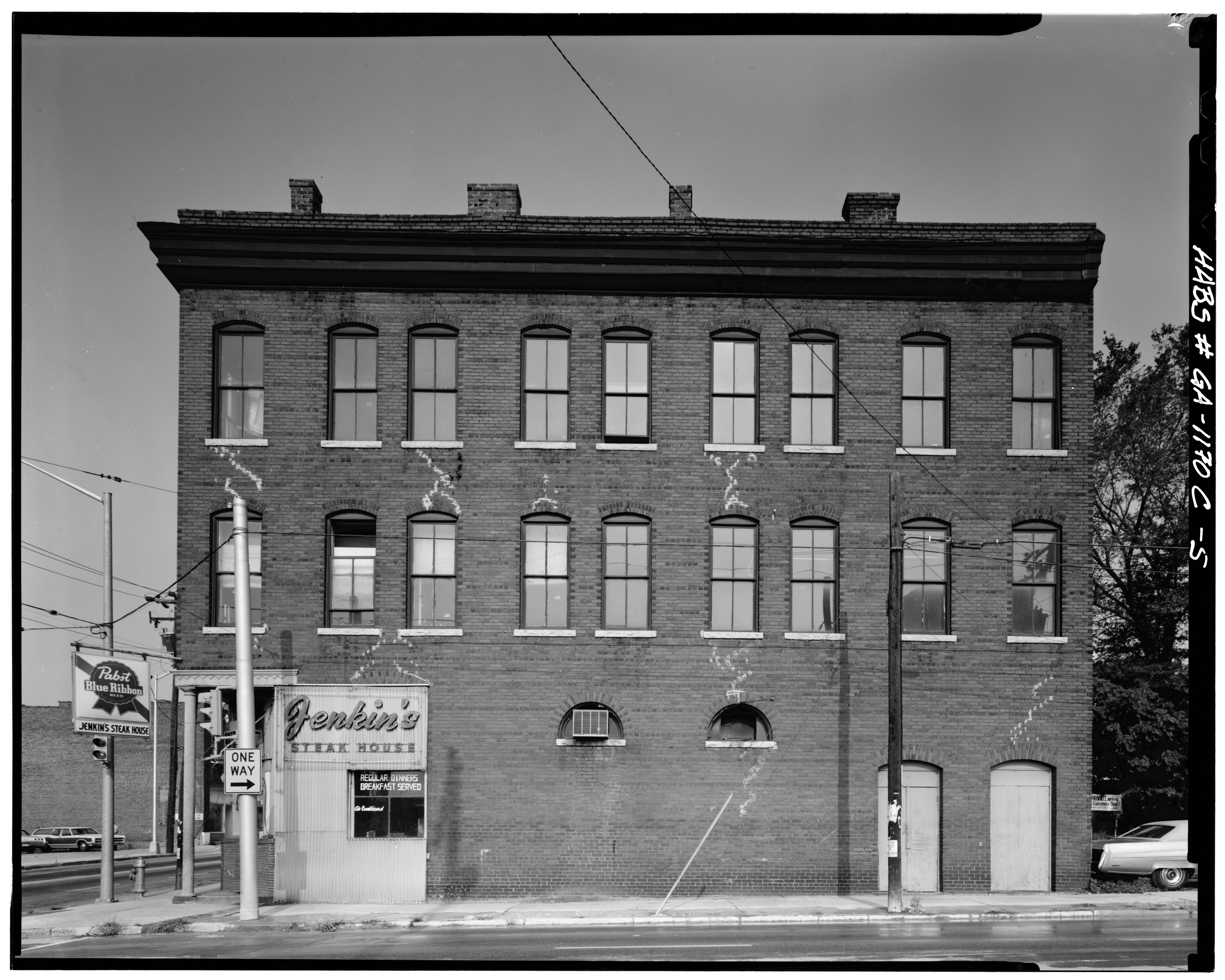
Rucker Building (1979)

In office, Rucker largely sought to maintain cordial relations with white business leaders such as the Augusta Brewing Company and tightly control newspaper accounts of his activities. This is exemplified by a 1904 article in the Atlanta Independent that characterized him as a "Model Citizen" who was "a Rich Heritage to the Race" due to earning respectability. His commitment to "good citizenship" came from a reputation as an "efficient and faithful [public] official with an "unsurpassable record." However, there were also negative political cartoons of Rocker in other papers. Despite being an important machine politician, his power was constrained by segregation, larger and more powerful white groups, and disfranchisement of blacks, forcing him to sometimes work with Democrats. In April 1904, Benjamin Jefferson Davis challenged Rucker's leadership, arguing that in order for Georgia Republicans to produce "a respectable vote" for Theodore Roosevelt, new leaders needed to be brought in to mobilize the party. Nonetheless, Rucker was able to maintain support and controlled the state convention in 1904 enough to pass Judson Lyons reappointment with no resistance from the white Republican faction. In 1906, he initiated construction of the Rucker Building on Auburn Avenue, which became a central feature of the black central business district in Atlanta. Rucker continued to serve as collector until 1911. By the time of his death in 1924, he was one of the wealthiest blacks in America.
