= William E. Holmes =

William Eve Holmes
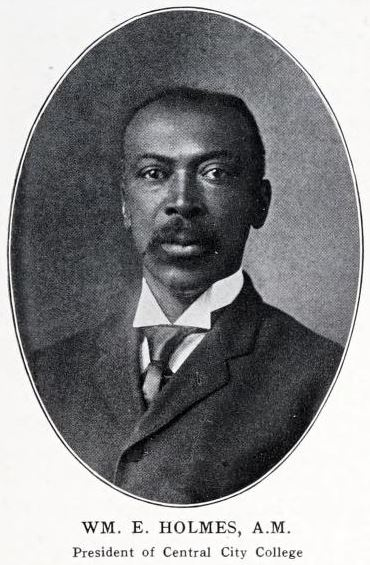
- William E. Homes, c. 1910

1st President of Central City College
- In office 1899–1924
- Succeeded by: J. H. Gadson

Personal details
- Born: January 22, 1856 Augusta, Georgia, United States
- Died: February 14, 1931 (aged 75) Philadelphia, Pennsylvania, United States
- Education: Atlanta Baptist Institute, University of Chicago, Lincoln University
- Occupation: Educator, minister

Religious life
- Religion: Baptist

William Eve Holmes Sr. (January 22, 1856 – February 14, 1931) was an American Baptist minister and educator and president of Central City College (later known as Georgia Baptist College) in Macon, Georgia, for 25 years. Before his term at Central City, he was a professor at the Atlanta Baptist Institute (now Morehouse College). He was also secretary of the board at Spelman College.

== Early life ==
William Eve Holmes was born in Augusta, Georgia, on January 22, 1856. His parents were slaves and belonged to different masters. His mother, by whom he was raised, was hired out from her planter master and worked for a carpenter. The carpenter and his wife had no children and came to like and care for William. William's mother could read and began William's lessons. Near the end of the American Civil War (1861-1865), Williams attended a school in secret. In 1871, William took work as for a cabinet-maker and undertaker where he worked for two years.

== Atlanta Baptist Institute ==
On December 10, 1874, he converted to the Baptist religion and joined the Thankful Baptist church in Augusta and on February 7, 1875, he was baptized. In 1875, he resumed his studies, then at the Augusta Institute, where he stayed for seven years (four in Augusta, and three in Atlanta when the school moved to that city under then new name, the "Atlanta Seminary"), studying under its president, New Englander Joseph T. Roberts. Along with theology and literature, he studied Hebrew under William R. Harper of Yale University and German and French. He was licensed to preach on June 21, 1878, and was ordained on September 2, 1881. When he graduated from what was then called the Atlanta Baptist Seminary in 1882, he was made full professor in the school. In May 1883, he was elected corresponding secretary of the Missionary Baptist Convention of Georgia, and he attended the convention many times. He received a Master of Arts from the University of Chicago on June 11, 1884. He married Elizabeth Beasley, a public school teacher and graduate of Atlanta University on July 15, 1885. In 1888 he was a member of the first board of Spelman Seminary, later Spelman College, and he served as secretary of the board for 18 years. He later received a doctor of divinity from Lincoln University in Chester, Pennsylvania.

== Baptist leader in Georgia ==
He became very active in African American religious and educational leadership in Georgia. He was a member of the board of trustees for the Carrie Steele Orphan's home and in 1890 was secretary. In 1895, he was president of the Georgia State Teachers' Association. In November 1895, he spoke at the National Negro Congress and was an organizer of the African American exhibition at the 1895 Worlds' Fair in New Orleans.

== Central City College ==
Holmes played an important role at the Atlanta Baptist Institute. He was popular with the students, a professor of history and English, secretary of the faculty, and librarian. In 1898, Holmes led a group of black Baptists in an attempt to remove Institute president George Sale from his position in favor of a black candidate. The attempt failed and Holmes moved to Macon, Georgia where he opened Central City College. Holmes had expected to be appointed president of the Institute in 1890, and when he was passed over in favor of Sale, a white minister from Canada, he questioned his chance for promotion. He was further disappointed when his friend John Hope, whom he had recruited to the Institute in 1897, did not support his goal. Prominent in support of this effort was Emanuel K. Love, a preacher from Savannah, Georgia, who organized the purchase of the college land. The school grew quickly and by the third year, 365 students were enrolled.

Holmes modeled Central City after the liberal arts education he received in England, as opposed to Booker T. Washington's industrial education model. Although, Holmes expected a number of faculty and students to follow him, that did not come to pass. James M. Nabrit (father of James Nabrit, Jr. was the only other early faculty member with a degree. The school included a grammar school, a high school, and a three-year theology program for men.

== Later career ==
Later in his career, Holmes continued to play a leadership role outside of the school. He was editor of the Baptist Truth and a prominent member of the Missionary Baptist Conventions of Georgia. In Jun 1921, the college administration building and Holmes personal residence were burned by an arsonist who was described as insane.

== Retirement and death ==
Holmes retired in about 1923 or 1924 and moved to Philadelphia. He died February 14, 1931, in Philadelphia and was buried on February 18.
