= Morehouse College =

Historically Black college in Atlanta, Georgia, U.S.

- Former names: Atlanta Baptist Seminary, Atlanta Baptist College
- Motto: Latin: "Et Facta Est Lux"
- Motto in English: And there was light
- Type: Private historically black men's liberal arts college
- Established: 1867; 159 years ago
- Academic affiliations: NAICU; CIC; Annapolis Group; ORAU; ACS; Oberlin Group; Space-grant
- Endowment: $275 million (2024)
- President: F. DuBois Bowman
- Students: 2,260 (fall 2021)
- Location: Atlanta, Georgia, U.S. 33°44′48″N 84°24′55″W
- Campus: 61 acres, urban
- Newspaper: The Maroon Tiger
- Colors: Maroon and white
- Nickname: Maroon Tigers
- Sporting affiliations: NCAA Division II SIAC
- Mascot: The Maroon Tiger
- Website: morehouse.edu
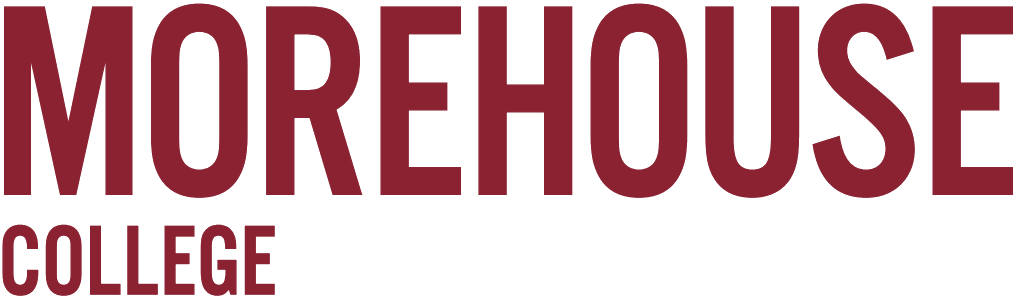

Morehouse College is a private, historically black, men's liberal arts college in Atlanta, Georgia, United States. Anchored by its main campus of 61 acres (25 ha) near downtown Atlanta, the college has a variety of residential dorms and academic buildings east of Ashview Heights. Along with Spelman College, Clark Atlanta University, Morris Brown College, and the Morehouse School of Medicine, the college is a member of the Atlanta University Center consortium.

Founded by William Jefferson White in 1867 in response to the liberation of enslaved African Americans following the American Civil War, Morehouse stressed preparatory and religious instruction in the Baptist tradition for students who had been prevented from receiving education by former slave laws. Growth in the late 19th and early 20th centuries led to strengthened finances, higher enrollment, and focus on the liberal arts. The college has played a key role in the development of the civil rights movement and racial equality in the United States.

The largest men's liberal arts college in the United States, Morehouse alumni include 11 Fulbright Scholars, six Rhodes Scholars, and five Marshall Scholars, and is the alma mater of many celebrated African Americans, including civil rights leader Martin Luther King Jr. and filmmaker Spike Lee. The college has graduated numerous "African-American firsts" in local, state and federal government, as well as in science, academia, business, and entertainment.

== History ==
=== Establishment ===
In 1867, two years after the American Civil War, the Augusta Institute was founded, by William Jefferson White, an Atlanta Baptist minister and cabinetmaker (William Jefferson White's half-brother, James E. Tate, was one of the founders of Atlanta University, now Clark Atlanta University), with the support of the Rev. Richard C. Coulter, a former slave from Atlanta, Georgia, and the Rev. Edmund Turney, organizer of the National Theological Institute for educating freedmen in Washington, D.C. The institution was founded to educate African-American men in theology and other subjects, at Springfield Baptist Church (Augusta, Georgia), the oldest independent Black church in the United States. The institution moved from Augusta to Atlanta in 1879. The school received sponsorship from the American Baptist Home Mission Society, an organization that helped establish several historically Black colleges. The institute's first president was the Rev. Joseph T. Robert (1871–1884) (father of Brigadier General Henry Martyn Robert, author of Robert's Rules of Order). An anti-slavery Baptist minister from South Carolina and 1828 graduate of Brown University, Robert raised funds, taught the classes, and stabilized the institution.

Morehouse's history
1867	Augusta Institute established
1879	Institute moved to Atlanta and name changed to Atlanta Baptist Seminary
1885	The seminary moved to its present location
1897	The school was renamed Atlanta Baptist College
1913	School renamed to Morehouse College
1929	Morehouse entered into a cooperative agreement with Clark College and Spelman College (later expanded to form the Atlanta University Center)
1975	The Morehouse School of Medicine established
1981	The Morehouse School of Medicine became independent from Morehouse College

=== Early years ===
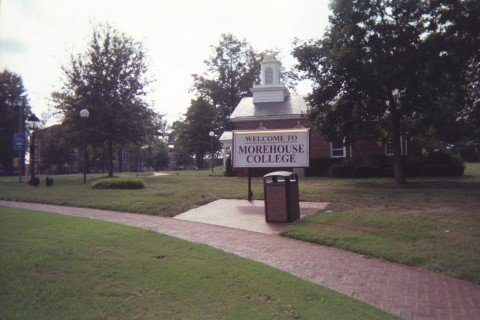
An entrance to the courtyard.

In 1879, the institute moved to Atlanta and changed its name to the Atlanta Baptist Seminary. It later acquired a four-acre (1.6 ha) campus in downtown Atlanta. In 1885, Samuel T. Graves became the second president. That year the seminary moved to its present location, on land given by a prominent Baptist and industrialist, John D. Rockefeller. In 1890, George Sale became the seminary's third president. In 1899, William E. Holmes, who had been the first African-American faculty member at the school, left to become the first president of Central City College in Macon, Georgia.

In 1906, John Hope became the first African-American president and led the institution's growth in enrollment and academic stature. He envisioned an academically rigorous college that would be the antithesis to Booker T. Washington's view of agricultural and trade-focused education for African Americans. In 1913, the college was renamed Morehouse College, in honor of the Rev. Henry L. Morehouse, corresponding secretary of the American Baptist Home Mission Society, who had long organized Rockefeller and the Society's support for the college. Morehouse entered into a cooperative agreement with Clark College and Spelman College in 1929 and later expanded the association to form the Atlanta University Center.

Samuel H. Archer became the fifth president of the college in 1931 and chose the school colors, maroon and white, to reflect his own alma mater, Colgate University. Benjamin Mays became president in 1940. Mays, who became a mentor to Martin Luther King Jr., presided over the growth in international enrollment and reputation. In the 1960s, Morehouse students were involved in the civil rights movement in Atlanta. Mays's speeches shaped the development of Morehouse students during his tenure.

In 1967, Hugh M. Gloster became the seventh president. The next year, Morehouse became the third historically Black institution (HBCU) to establish a Phi Beta Kappa Honors Society. In 1975, Gloster established the Morehouse School of Medicine, which became independent from Morehouse College in 1981. Gloster also established a dual-degree program in engineering with the Georgia Institute of Technology, the University of Michigan, and Boston University.

=== Modern history ===
Leroy Keith Jr., was named president in 1987. In 1995, alumnus Walter E. Massey, became Morehouse's ninth president. His successor, alumnus Robert Michael Franklin Jr. was the tenth president of the college. In November 2012, alumnus John Silvanus Wilson was announced as the institution's 11th president. In January 2018, David A. Thomas took office as the college's 12th president.

In 2006, Morehouse graduated 540 men, the largest class in its history. On May 16, 2008, Joshua Packwood became the first white valedictorian to graduate in the school's 141-year history. In August 2008, Morehouse welcomed a total of 920 new students (770 freshmen and 150 transfer students) to its campus, one of the largest entering classes in the history of the school.

Morehouse celebrated several historic milestones in 2013. One century prior, in 1913, Atlanta Baptist College was renamed Morehouse College after Henry Lyman Morehouse, corresponding secretary for the American Baptist Home Mission Society. 2013 was also the 50th anniversary of the 1963 March on Washington, when Morehouse graduate Martin Luther King Jr., class of 1948, delivered his iconic "I Have a Dream" speech at the March on Washington for Jobs and Freedom. The year also marked the 50th anniversary of King's "Letter from Birmingham Jail". The college also celebrated the 25th anniversary of the "A Candle in the Dark" Gala, which is an annual event that honors some of the world's leaders and raises scholarship funds for Morehouse students.

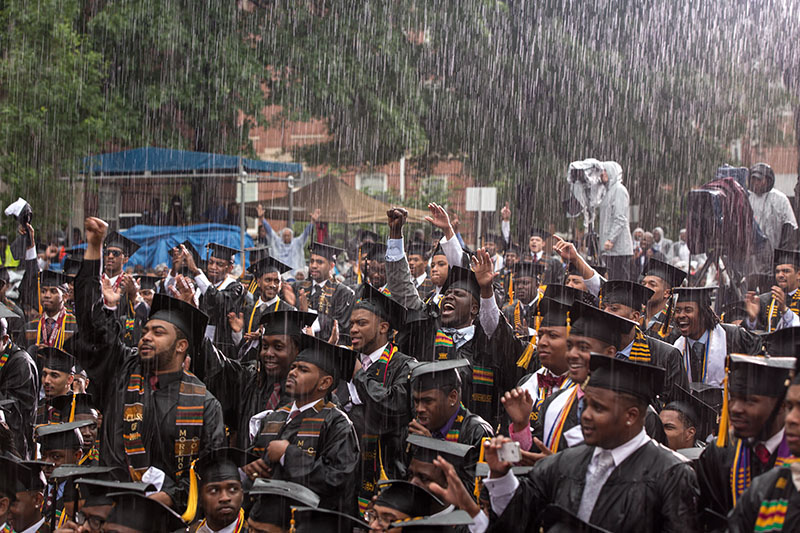
The 129th Commencement in 2013

In May 2013, President Barack Obama became the first sitting president in three-quarters of a century to deliver a commencement address in Georgia when he took part in Morehouse College's 129th Commencement ceremony. Franklin Delano Roosevelt had given a summer commencement address at the University of Georgia in 1938. President Obama received an honorary Doctor of Laws degree from Morehouse.

In April 2019, Morehouse announced that they will begin admitting transgender men for the first time in the year 2020. In May 2019, Robert F. Smith who received an honorary degree at Morehouse College's 135th commencement ceremony, promised to pay the educational loan debt for every spring 2019 graduate which totaled about $34 million. Smith's gift is one of the largest single donations from a living donor to a HBCU in history.

In June 2020, Reed Hastings and his wife Patty Quillin donated $40 million to Morehouse College to be used as scholarship funds for students enrolled at Morehouse. Their single donation is one of the largest in HBCU history and the largest ever for Morehouse. In July 2020, Morehouse received a $20 million donation from MacKenzie Scott.

In early February 2021, Morehouse announced its online degree completion program for adult learners. Later in the month, the school launched its first online certificate course focused on athletics and social activism.

In January 2022, Morehouse announced the establishment of the Black Men's Research Institute. It is the first research institute of its kind focusing on the cultural, economic, personal and social outcomes of issues affecting Black men, particularly where disparities exist in the world. In February 2022, Morehouse launched a $500 million capital campaign to fund scholarships for students from low-income households (majority of students), pay for infrastructure and technology improvements, produce research, and to recruit and retain faculty.

== Administration and organization ==
Morehouse's governing body is its board of trustees. The Morehouse Board of Trustees has 37 members, including three student trustees and three faculty trustees. As of December 2014, five of the six executive board members and seven of the 31 general trustees are Morehouse alumni.

The current president of Morehouse is F. DuBois Bowman.

Morehouse is also a member of the Atlanta University Center. The AUC campuses are co-located in the city of Atlanta, which provides an opportunity for cross-registration, particularly for undergraduates.

== Campus ==
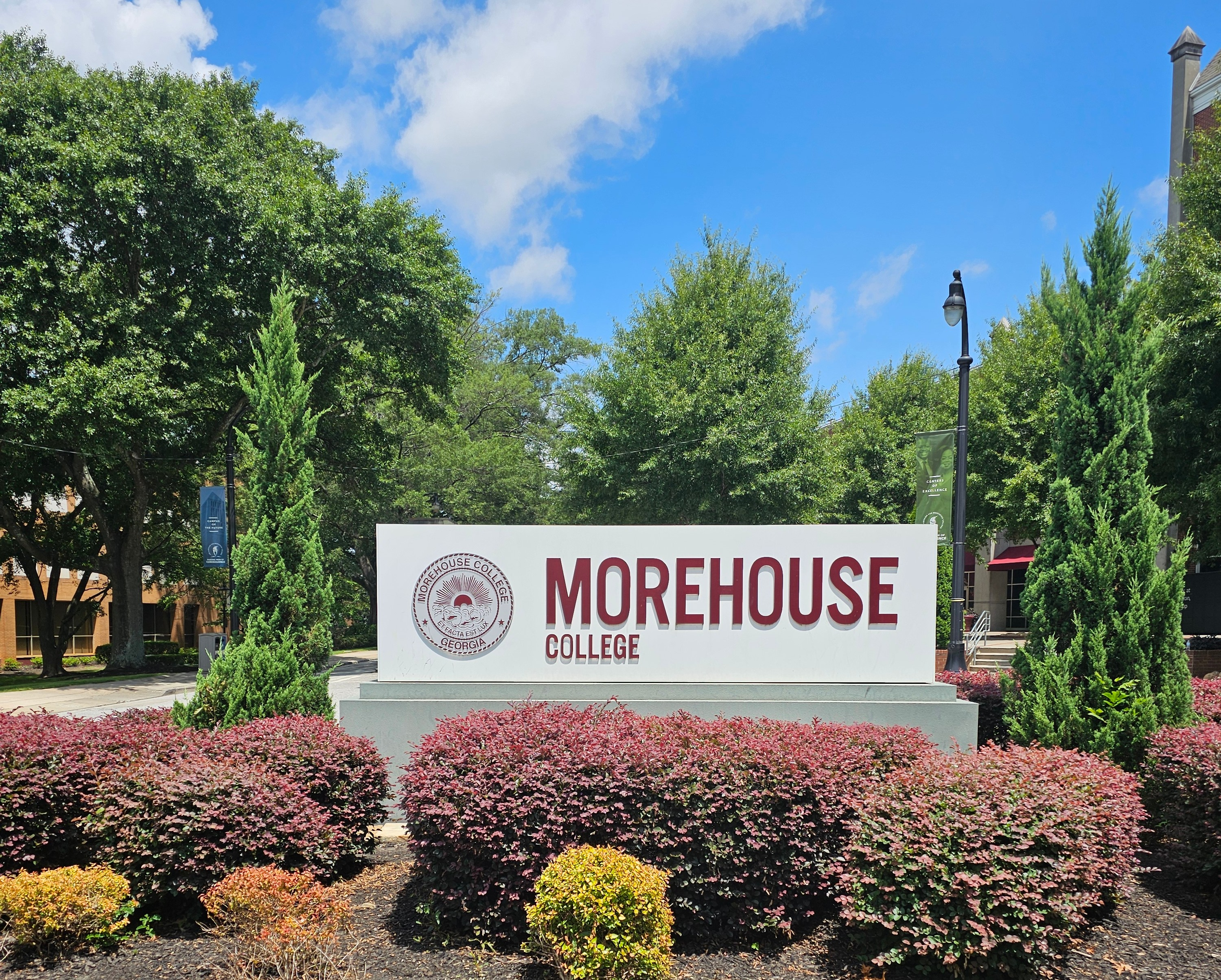
Morehouse College sign in 2025

Morehouse is located on 61-acre (25 ha) campus near downtown Atlanta.

=== Buildings ===
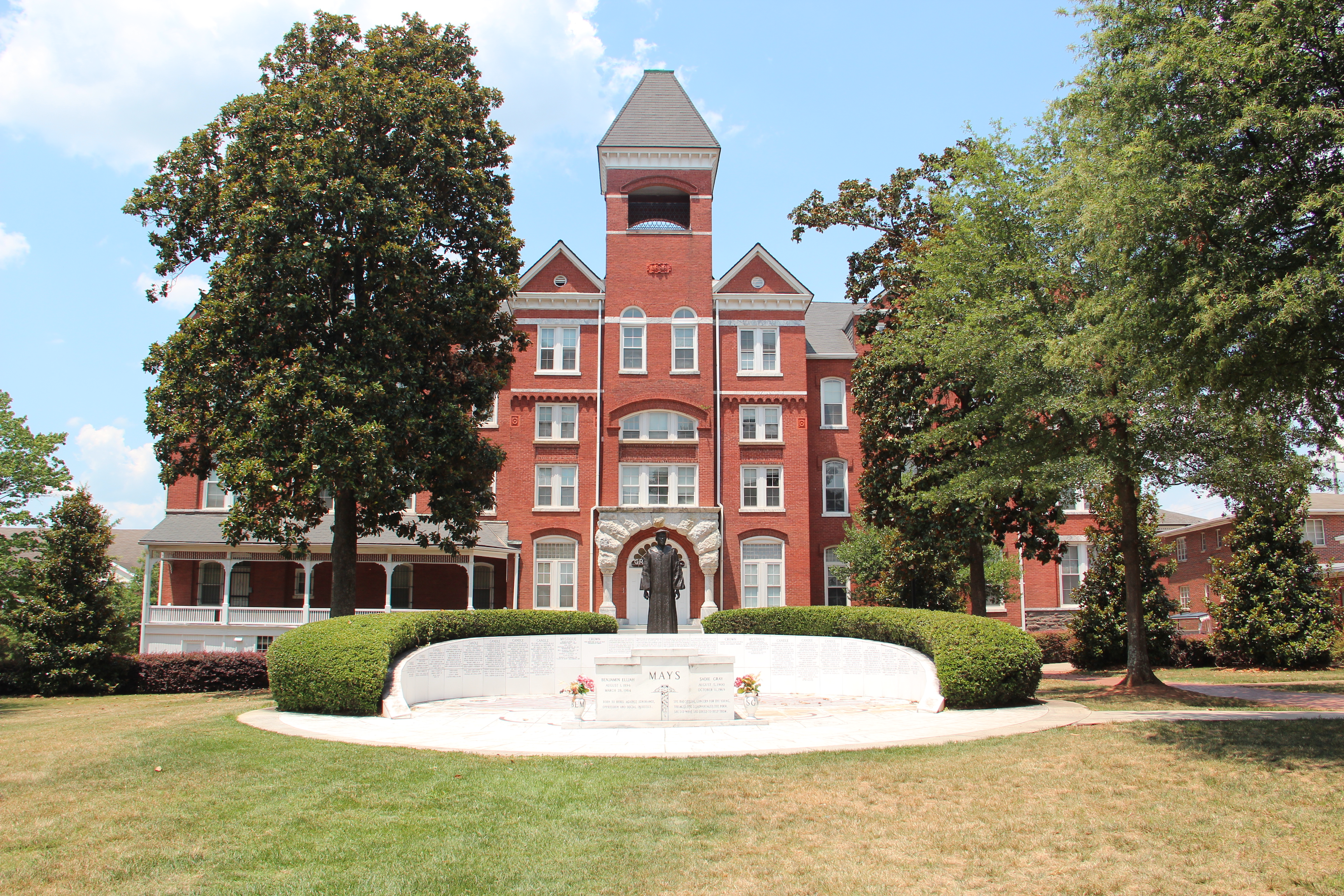
Graves Hall, Century Campus, and Benjamin Mays' tomb

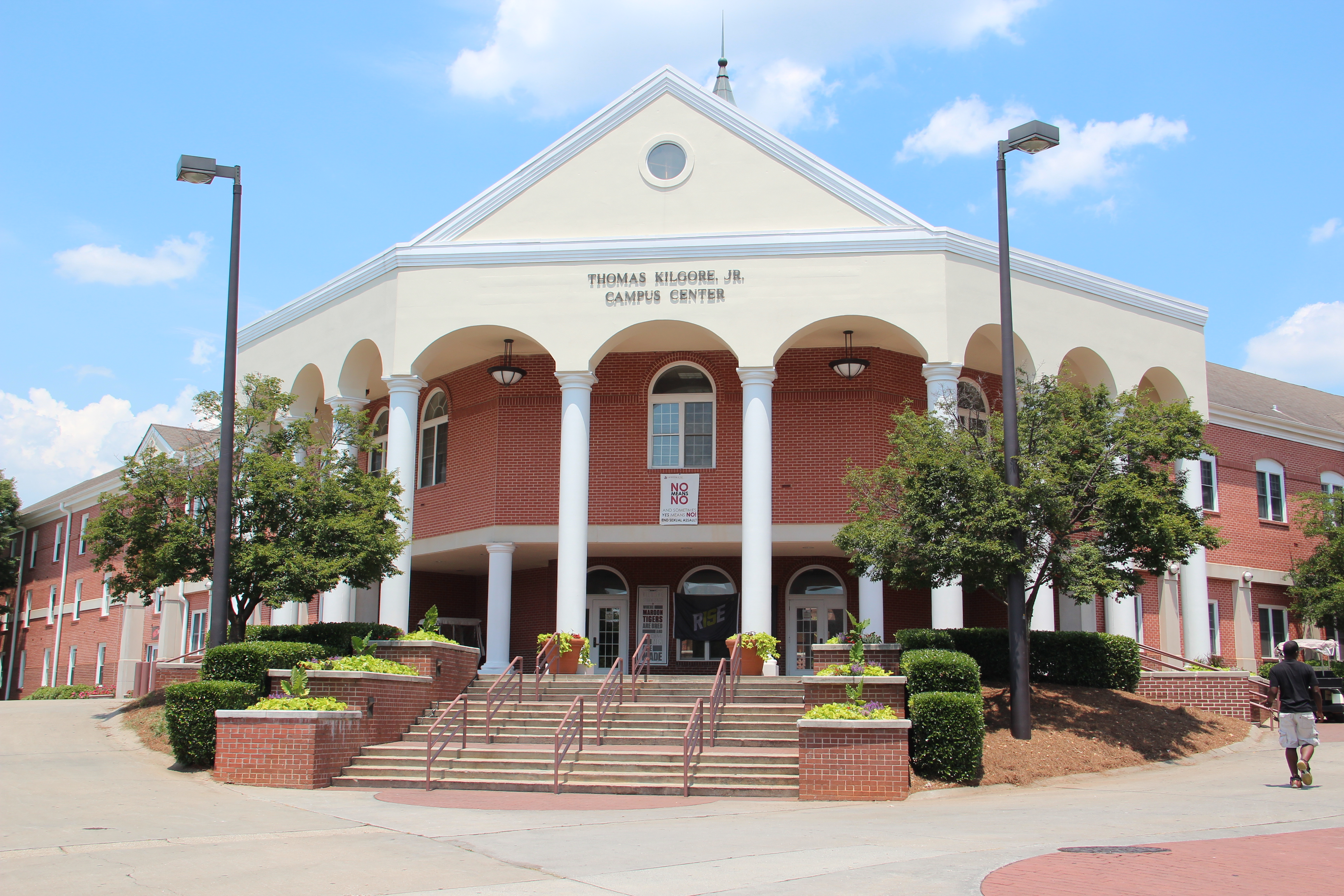
Kilgore Campus Center

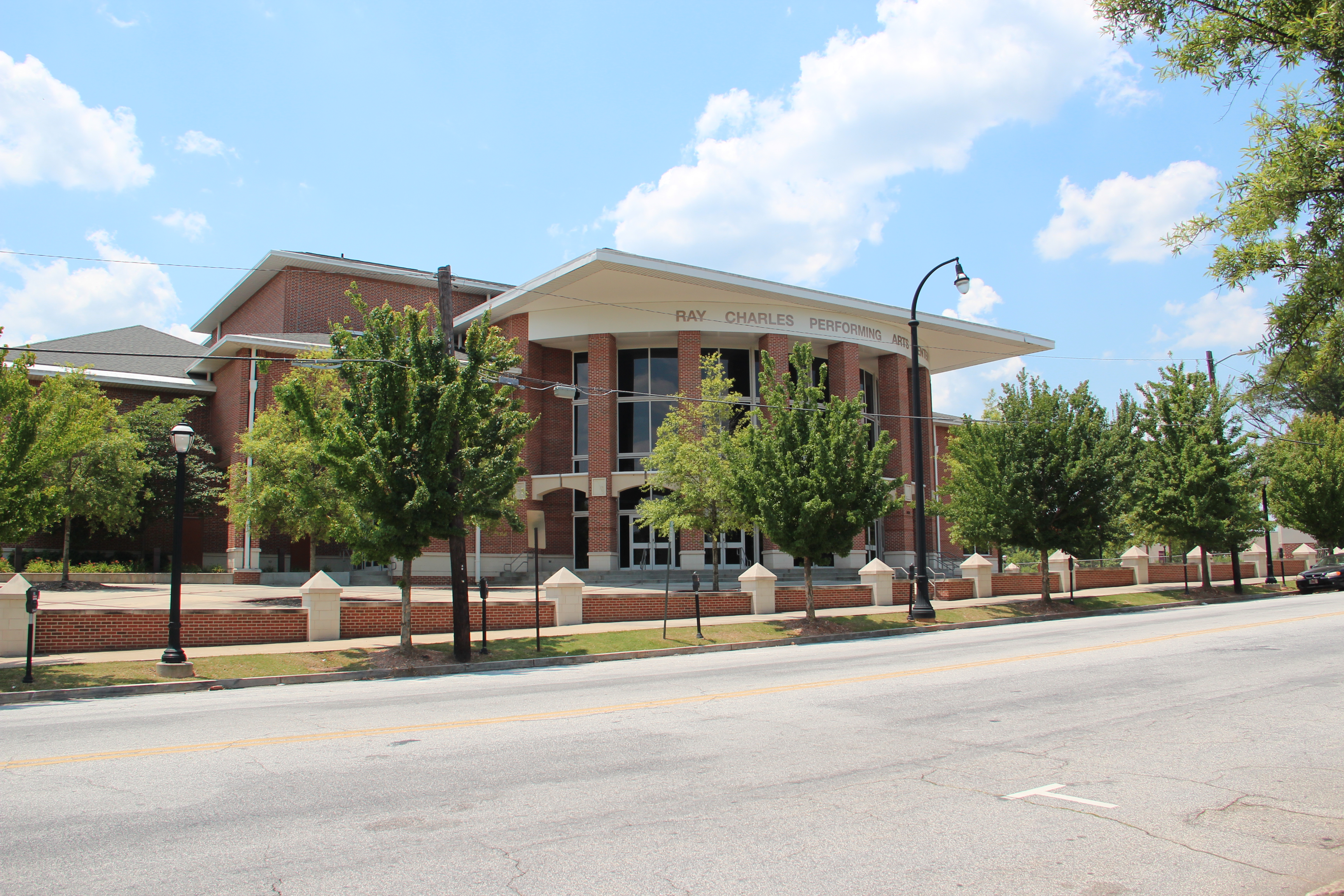
Ray Charles Performing Arts Center

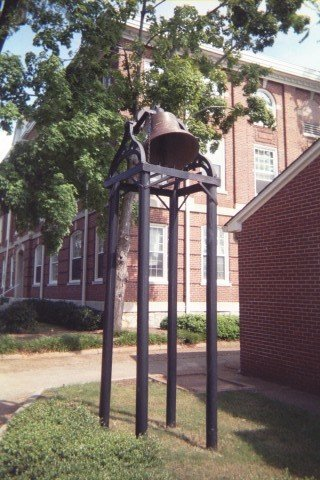
Historic Chapel Bell outside of Sale Hall

- Archer Hall, named after the fifth president of Morehouse College, Samuel H. Archer, holds the college's recreational facilities such as its gymnasium, swimming pool, and game room. The gymnasium seats 1,000 people and was used by the college's basketball team before Franklin Forbes Arena was built.
- B. T. Harvey Stadium/Edwin Moses Track is a 9,000-seat stadium built in 1983. The track is named after the only alumnus to win an Olympic gold medal. At the time of the stadium's completion, it was the largest on-campus stadium at any private HBCU in the nation.
- Brawley Hall, named after Benjamin Griffith Brawley, houses the college's History, English, Language, and Art departments.
- Brazeal Hall is a dormitory built in 1991. It housed athletes during the time of the 1996 Olympics in Atlanta. Brazeal Hall originally housed upper-class men, though it currently serves as a freshman dorm.
- Ray Charles Performing Arts Center and Aretha Robinson Music Academic Building is a 76,000-square-foot (7,100 m^{2}) facility dedicated on September 29, 2010. The Emma & Joe Adams concert hall is named after Ray Charles' longtime manager and his wife. Joe Adams was president of the Ray Charles Foundation and played a significant fundraising role in the construction of the center.
- Chivers Hall/Lane Hall is the cafeteria of the college and has been featured in many movies. It seats 600 people and is attached to Mays Hall. The Sadie Mays lounge, named for the wife of Mays, connects Mays Hall and Chivers Hall.
- Dansby Hall houses the school's Physics, Psychology, and Mathematics departments.
- Douglass Hall (also known as LRC (Learning Resource Center)), named after Frederick Douglass was originally built as the school's student center but today serves as an academic readiness center, which features study spaces, conference rooms, and a computing lab. Most of the college's tutoring and academic support programming takes place here.
- DuBois Hall is a freshman dorm erected in 1973, named after philosopher W. E. B. Du Bois.
- Franklin L. Forbes Arena is a 5,700-seat capacity arena, built for the 1996 Olympic Games. It is now the main gymnasium for the college's basketball team and holds many events year-round. In 2018, for the first time in program history, Morehouse hosted the 2018 NCAA Division II men's basketball tournament's South Region Championship and the 2018 McDonald's All American Dunk Contest in Forbes Arena. The arena has hosted many celebrities and politicians, including President Barack Obama and presidential hopefuls Stacey Abrams, Bernie Sanders, and Joe Biden.
- Graves Hall, named after the second president of Morehouse College, Samuel T. Graves, is home to the Howard Thurman Honors Program and Bonner Scholars. When constructed in the 1880s, it was the tallest building in Atlanta. When the college relocated to the West End area, student housing, classrooms, and administration offices were all contained within the building.
- Hope Hall was named after John Hope, the first African-American president (fourth president) of Morehouse College. When erected, it was known as the Science Building, then later the Biology Building. Through the years, the building became too small for classroom use and now holds laboratories for departments that are in other buildings. Hope Hall includes the offices of the Public Health Sciences Institute.
- Hubert Hall is a freshman dorm named after Charles D. Hubert, who was an acting president from 1938 to 1940.
- Kilgore Campus Center houses administrative offices, as well as several seminar rooms and lounges. A separate area of the building serves as a dormitory. Archer Hall, B. T. Harvey Stadium, and the exterior of Graves Hall are featured in the Spike Lee film School Daze.
- Living Learning Center (LLC) was formerly known as Thurman Hall. It is one of the school's freshman dorms.
- Martin Luther King, Jr. International Chapel/Gloster Hall was built in 1978 as the new auditorium and administration building for Morehouse College, replacing Sale and Harkness halls. It is home to the Gandhi–King–Ikeda Reconciliation Institute. Notably, Harkness hall was originally erected as an Atlanta University structure but also housed administrative offices for Morehouse. Harkness hall is now a Clark Atlanta University structure due to Atlanta University's consolidation with Clark College.
- Mays Hall was named after the sixth president of Morehouse College, Benjamin Mays. It houses dorm rooms and is the headquarters for residence life for the college.
- Merrill Hall, named after Charles E. Merrill Jr., a chairman of the college's board of trustees, became the chemistry building. The 2000s (decade) saw Merrill Hall undergo a renovation that doubled its size. Its new corridor is called John Hopps Technology Tower, which houses the Computer Science department as well as the office of Information Technology Services.
- Nabrit–Mapp–McBay Hall was erected in 1987. The building is also known as Bio-Chem' from a plaque at the corridor stating that the building was built to house the Biology and Chemistry classrooms. It now holds the Biology department. It was named for distinguished science professors Samuel M. Nabrit, Frederick Mapp, and Henry McBay.
- Otis Moss Jr. Residential Suites are apartment, studio, and suite dwellings built in 2003. The Suites were renamed in spring 2006, after Otis Moss Jr. (class of 1956), former chair of Morehouse's board of trustees.
- Perdue Hall is a residences hall built around the time of the 1996 Summer Olympics. It housed athletes during the 1996 Olympic events.
- Robert Hall, named after Joseph T. Robert, the first president of the college, was erected to be the college's first residence hall. When built, there was a cafeteria in its basement. Today the basement houses a post office.
- Sale Hall, named after the third president, was built to contain classrooms. Today, it is the department building for religion and philosophy courses. On the second floor, a small auditorium, called the Chapel of the Inward Journey', was used for religious and commencement proceedings. Today, the chapel is used for recitals, pageants, and student government association election debates.

Shirley A. Massey Executive Conference Center is named after the first lady of the ninth president of the college. It houses several large conference rooms and the Bank of America Auditorium. The building has hosted human rights film festivals, moving screenings, and panel discussions featuring international figures.

- Walter E. Massey Leadership Center houses the Business Administration and Economics departments, the Bonner Office of Community Service as well as other offices. It also has a 500-seat auditorium and an executive conference center. The building was completed in 2005 and is named after Walter E. Massey (ninth president).
- Wheeler Hall is a building used primarily by the Political Science and Sociology departments.
- White Hall is a freshman residence hall, named after the college's founder.

=== Monuments ===
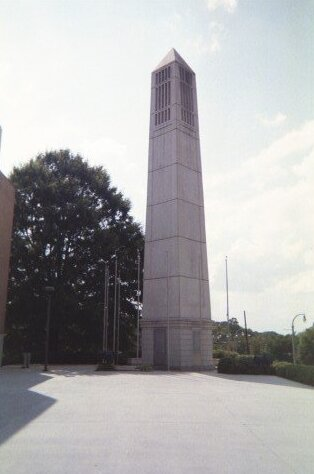
Obelisk in front of King Chapel dedicated to theologian and civil rights leader Howard Thurman

A bronze statue of Martin Luther King Jr. stands at the eastern portion of the main entrance plaza of the Martin Luther King Jr. International Chapel. Inscribed in the base of the statue are the words of King.

An obelisk named in honor of Howard Thurman stands at the western end of the main entrance plaza of King Chapel. The base of the Thurman Obelisk contains the remains of Thurman and his wife. The obelisk also houses a carillon.

The grave sites of two presidents of Morehouse College are located on campus:

- A statue of Benjamin Mays stands atop a marble monument situated in front of Graves Hall. This monument marks the graves of President Mays and his wife, Sadie Gray Mays. Behind the graves are memoirs and a time capsule set to be opened in May 2095.
- Hugh Morris Gloster, seventh president of Morehouse College and founder of Morehouse School of Medicine, is buried in the eastern lawn of the college's main administration building bearing his name.

== Academics ==
Morehouse College is accredited by the Commission and Colleges of the Southern Association of Colleges and Schools (SACS) to award Bachelor of Arts and Bachelor of Science degrees. Morehouse offers more than 30 majors and the Howard Thurman Honors Program which is a selective academic program providing special opportunities for students of outstanding intellectual ability, high motivation, and broad interests. Additionally, students have many opportunities to participate in domestic exchange, study abroad, research, dual degree, internship, and leadership programs.

Its most popular majors, based on 2021 graduates, were:

Business Administration & Management (108)
Biology/Biological Sciences (45)
Political Science & Government (31)
Sports, Kinesiology & Physical Education/Fitness (30)
Psychology (27)

=== Reputation and rankings ===
Academic rankings

Liberal arts
- U.S. News & World Report: 100
- Washington Monthly: 196

National
- Forbes: 645
- WSJ/College Pulse: 401–500

In 2023, U.S. News & World Report ranked Morehouse tied for 100th overall, tied 20th for "Social Mobility", and tied 20th for "Best Undergraduate Teaching" among liberal arts colleges in the US; additionally, it ranked Morehouse 5th among Historically Black Colleges and Universities. In 2019, The Alumni Factor ranked Morehouse among the best 50 colleges in the nation.

Morehouse has conferred more bachelor's degrees on Black men than any other institution in the nation. Morehouse is the top institution for producing the most Black male Rhodes Scholars and leads all HBCUs in total Rhodes Scholars. Morehouse is a top baccalaureate-origin institution of Black male doctorate recipients. In 2015, TrendTopper MediaBuzz College Guide ranked Morehouse as the HBCU with the best brand. A 2008 National Science Foundation study found that of more than 3,000 colleges and universities in the U.S., Morehouse College was the fifth biggest producer of African Americans who eventually earned PhDs in the STEM fields.

=== Library and collections ===
Morehouse College, along with other members of the Atlanta University Center, share the Robert W. Woodruff Library.

Morehouse College is home to a 10,000-piece collection of original documents written by Martin Luther King Jr. (referred to as the King Collection). The set was valued by the Library of Congress as being worth between $28 and $30 million and was originally scheduled by his family to be auctioned off to the general public in 2006, but private donors in Atlanta intervened and offered a pre-auction bid at $32 million. On June 29, it was announced by Atlanta mayor Shirley Franklin, a key catalyst in the buyout, that a new civil rights museum would be built in the city to make the documents available for research, public access and exhibits. Coca-Cola donated a land parcel valued at $10 million in order to assist with the development of the project. The collection includes King's 1964 Nobel Prize acceptance speech.

== Athletics ==
Official athletics logo

In sports, the Morehouse College Maroon Tigers are affiliated with the NCAA Division II Southern Intercollegiate Athletic Conference (SIAC). Morehouse College competes in football, basketball, baseball, cross country, tennis, track & field, men's volleyball, polo, and golf.

== Student life ==
The Morehouse College student population is approximately 2,250, with 70% coming from outside Georgia. Approximately 80% of the student body receives financial aid to pay for their education. The average first-year student received $18,241 in need-based scholarships or grants.

=== New Student Orientation ===
New Student Orientation (NSO) is an eight-day experience that culminates with new students ceremoniously initiated as Men of Morehouse. They learn about the legacy of the college, traditions, academic divisions, the brotherhood, and the "Morehouse Mystique". These components complement academic success strategies designed to help them successfully matriculate to Morehouse Men (graduates). NSO is led by student orientation leaders, staff and alumni; all new students are placed on midnight curfew during NSO.

=== Residence halls ===
Morehouse has 10 residence halls on campus. Approximately 60% of Morehouse students live on campus. Five residence halls are for first-year students only and five for upperclassmen only. It is a tradition for students living in first-year only residence halls to compete in various friendly competitions (i.e. stroll-offs, chant-offs, pranks, fundraising, etc.) during the academic school year. Seniors (minimum of 90 credits) are the only group automatically allowed to live off campus; non-seniors must get approval by the college.

=== Regulation of campus attire ===
In October 2009, Morehouse College initiated a campus wide attire policy that prohibits students from wearing women's clothes, jewelry on their teeth, pajamas as classroom attire, du-rags or bandanas on their heads, or pants which hang below the waist at official college-sponsored events. This dress code is part of the Five Wells which holds that "Morehouse Men are Renaissance Men with a social conscience and global perspective who are Well-Read, Well-Spoken, Well-Traveled, Well-Dressed and Well-Balanced." William Bynum, vice president for Student Services was quoted by CNN as saying, "We are talking about five students who are living a gay lifestyle that is leading them to dress [in] a way we do not expect in Morehouse men." These remarks and the attire policy itself have been the source of great controversy both on and off the campus. Then-university president Robert Michael Franklin Jr. sent out an email to the schools' alumni, clarifying that the university's attire policy was not intended as an affront to gay students.

=== Activities and clubs ===
Morehouse College offers organized and informal co-curricular activities including more than 80 student organizations, varsity, club, intramural sports, and student publications. Morehouse is an NCAA Division II school and competes in numerous sports, including football, baseball, basketball, cross country, volleyball, and track & field.

=== Morehouse Marching Band (House of Funk) ===
The Morehouse College Marching Band, better known as the House of Funk, is known for their halftime performances which combine dance and marching with music from various genres, including rap, traditional marching band music, and pop music. They have performed at Super Bowl XXVIII, the Today Show, at Atlanta Falcons home games, and in a national commercial with Morehouse alumnus Samuel Jackson. They gave the halftime show during the 2013 NCAA Men's National Championship basketball game. Affectionately known as the "House of Funk" they march alongside Spelman's Maroon Mystique Color guard (flag spinning) squad and Mahogany-N-Motion danceline.

=== Debate team ===
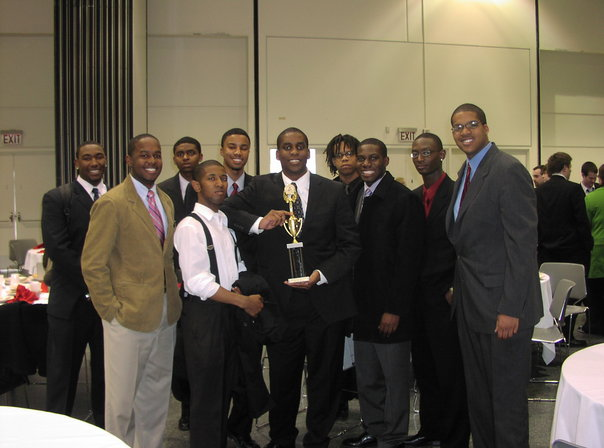
2005–2006 Morehouse College Mock Trial Team after it obtained an "Honorable Mention" award in their first appearance at the American Mock Trial Association National Championship Tournament in 2006

Morehouse's debate team claims to have been formed in 1906. In 2005, Morehouse College became a member of the American Mock Trial Association (AMTA). The school is one of only four competing teams to come from a historically Black college and is also the only all-male team in the AMTA. From 2006 to 2010, Morehouse consecutively won their regional championship competitions, and thus received direct trips to the AMTA national championship competitions in Iowa, Florida, and Minnesota.

In 2016, Morehouse became the first HBCU, Georgia institution, and men's college selected to host the annual US Universities Debating Championship which had nearly 200 teams from across the nation participate.

In 2017, the Morehouse College Debate Team won an international first place title and a trip to Paris, France after defeating Vanderbilt University in the final round at the Lafayette Debates North American Championship in Washington D.C.

=== Glee Club ===
Founded in 1911, the Morehouse College Glee Club has an extensive performance history. The Glee Club has performed at Martin Luther King Jr.'s funeral, President Jimmy Carter's inauguration and funeral, Super Bowl XXVIII, and the 1996 Summer Olympics in Atlanta.

=== The Maroon Tiger ===
The college's weekly student-run newspaper is The Maroon Tiger. Founded in 1898 as The Athenaeum, it was renamed in 1925. American poet and writer Thomas Dent was a contributor while he attended from 1948 to 1952, as was Martin Luther King Jr. Maroon Tiger former editors and contributors include Geoff Bennett, Vann R. Newkirk II, Donovan Ramsey, Tre'vell Anderson, Lerone Bennett Jr., Shaun King as well as a host of others. The 2008–2009 staff sought to expand the newspaper into a news organization by creating Morehouse's first television news program, Tiger TV, and advancing online news coverage.

=== Miss Maroon & White ===
Several Spelman and Clark Atlanta juniors that advance past preliminary interviews compete for the title of Miss Maroon & White through a formal campaign and beauty pageant process during the spring semester of each year. Only Morehouse students can vote to determine the winner which is the contestant that best represents the ideal counterpart for a Morehouse Man. Miss Maroon & White and her royal court (two runners-up known as attendants) collectively serve as official Morehouse ambassadors and represents the womanly embodiment of the institution. The tradition of crowning a young woman as Miss Maroon & White began in 1936 with Juanita Maxie Ponder of Spelman College winning the first crown. Miss Maroon & White is the longest active pageant title in the Atlanta University Center.

=== National fraternities and honor societies ===
Morehouse College has chapters of several national fraternities and honor societies on campus. About three percent of students are active in Morehouse's National Pan-Hellenic Council (NPHC).

=== Religious organizations ===
Campus religious organizations include the Atlanta University Center Catholic Student Coalition, King International Chapel Ministry, Martin Luther King International Chapel Assistants, King Chapel Choir, Muslim Students Association, New Life Inspirational Fellowship Church Campus Ministry, and The Outlet.

== Notable alumni ==
Morehouse is the first historically Black college to produce a Rhodes Scholar. The school's first Rhodes Scholar, Nima Warfield, was named in 1994, the second, Christopher Elders, in 2001. A third, Oluwabusayo "Topé" Folarin, was named in 2004, the fourth, Prince Abudu, was named in 2015, the fifth, Franck Nijimbere, was named in 2018, and the sixth, Aniaba Jean-Baptist N'guessan, was named in 2025. Morehouse has been home to 11 Fulbright Scholars. Since 1999, Morehouse has produced five Marshall Scholars, one Schwarzman Scholar, five Luce Scholars, four Watson Fellows and 2010 White House Fellow, Erich Caulfield.

Presidents Joe Biden, Barack Obama, and Jimmy Carter hold honorary doctorates of laws from Morehouse, after giving commencement speeches.

Notable Morehouse graduates include:

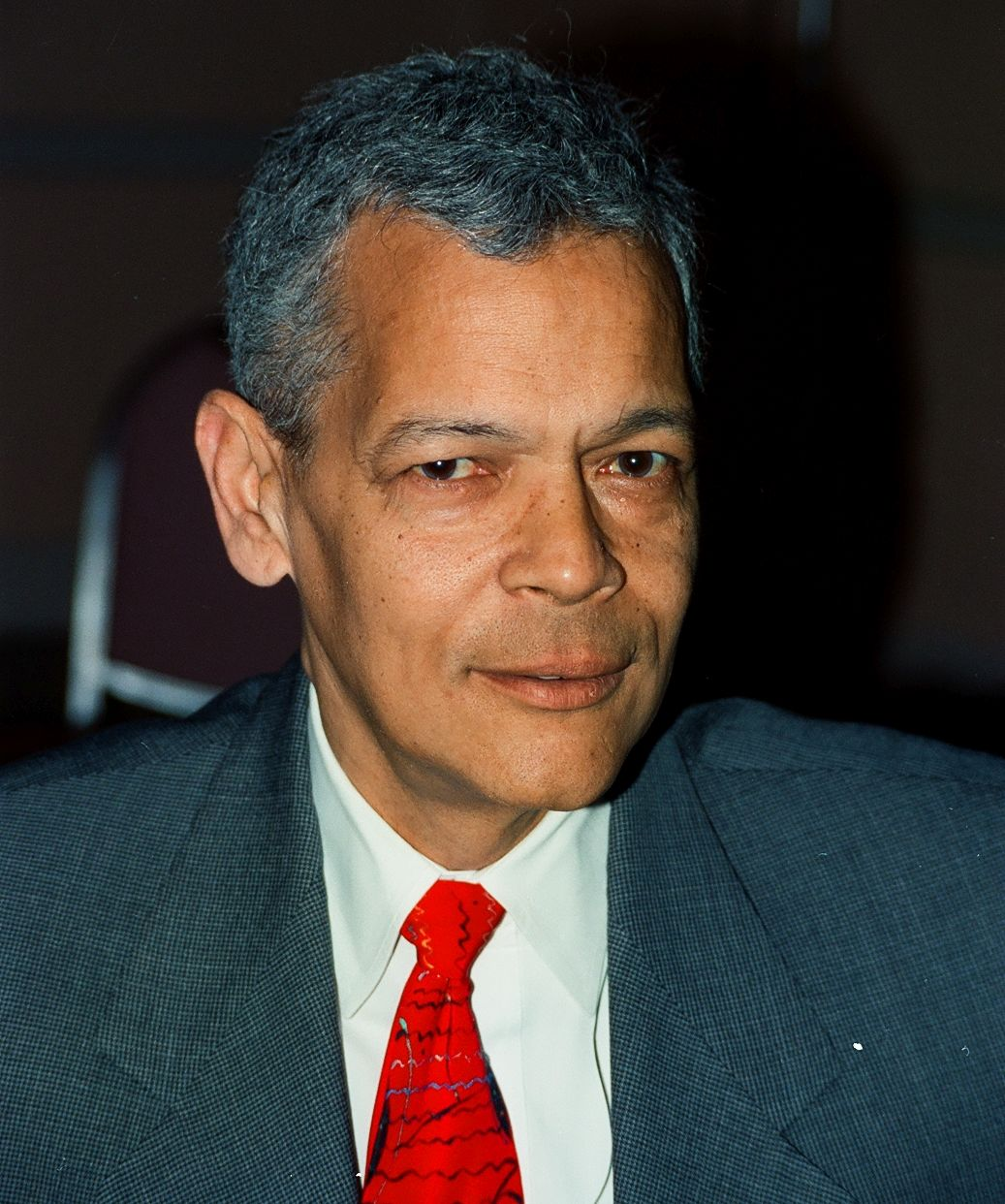
Julian Bond

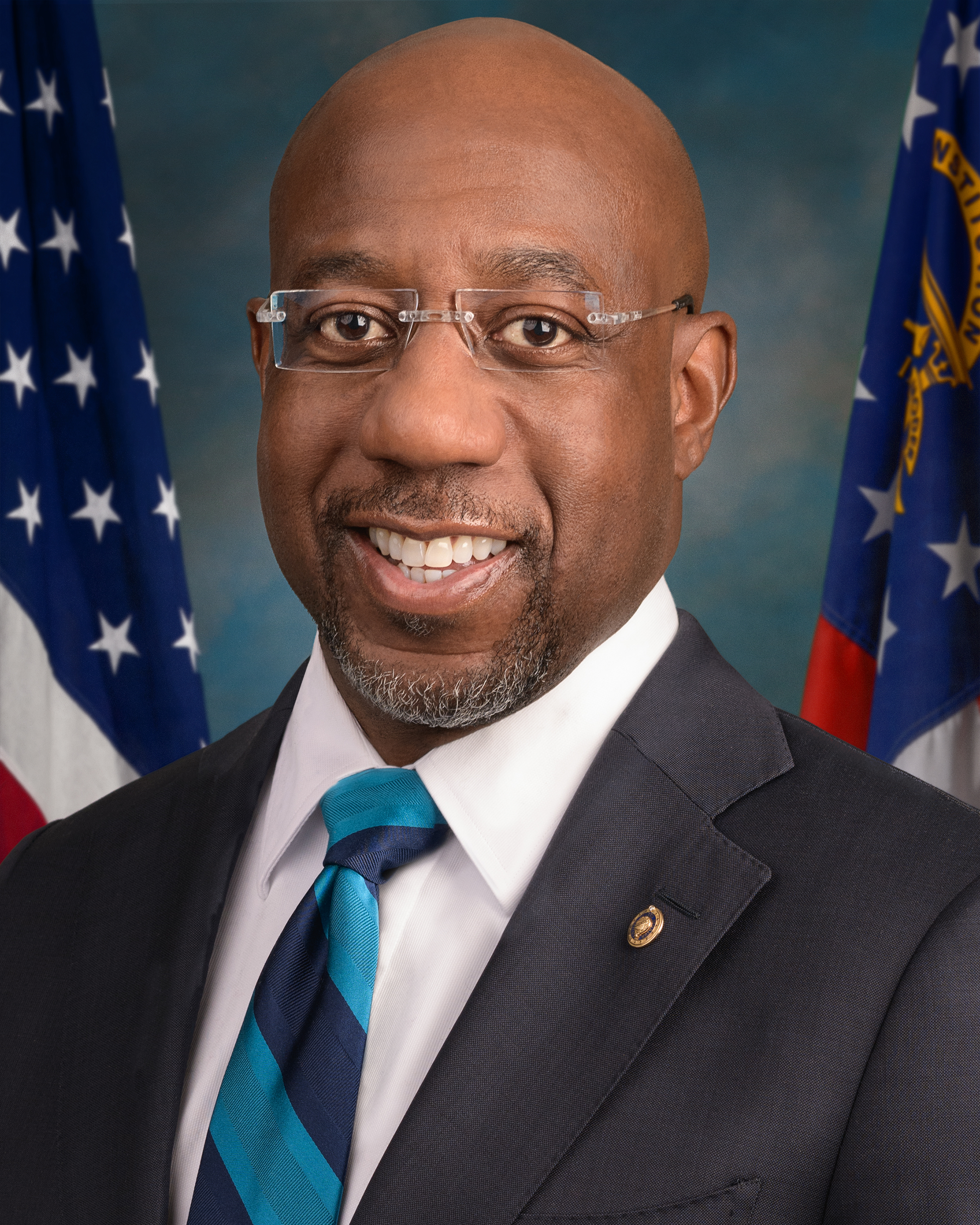
Raphael Warnock

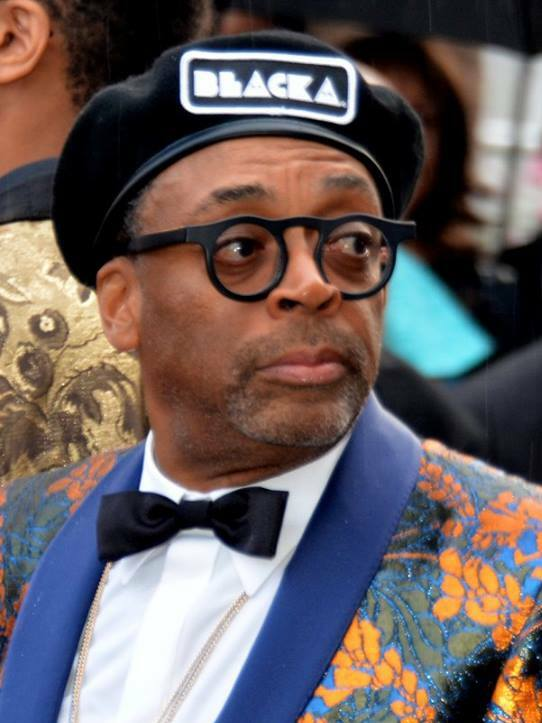
Spike Lee

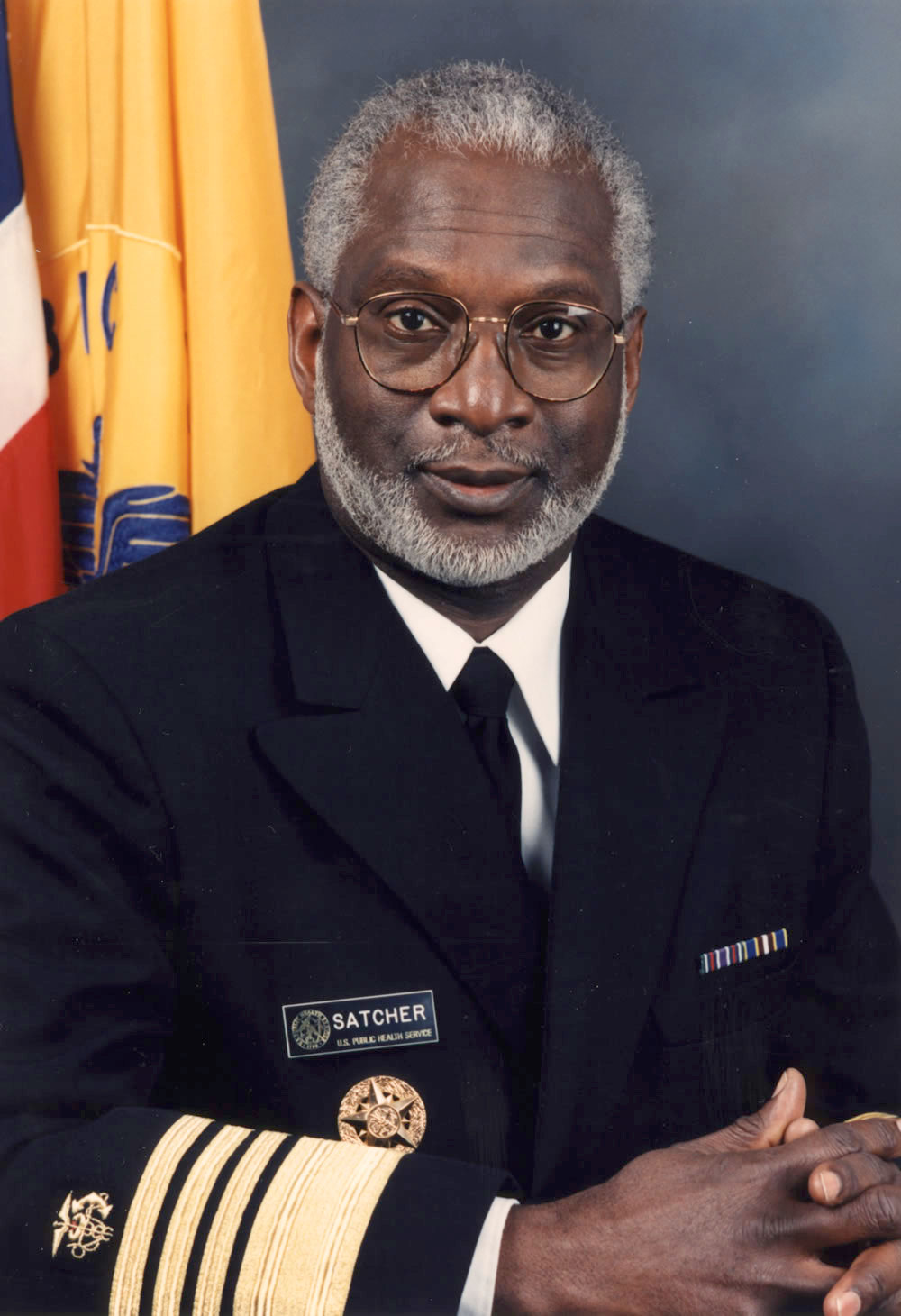
David Satcher

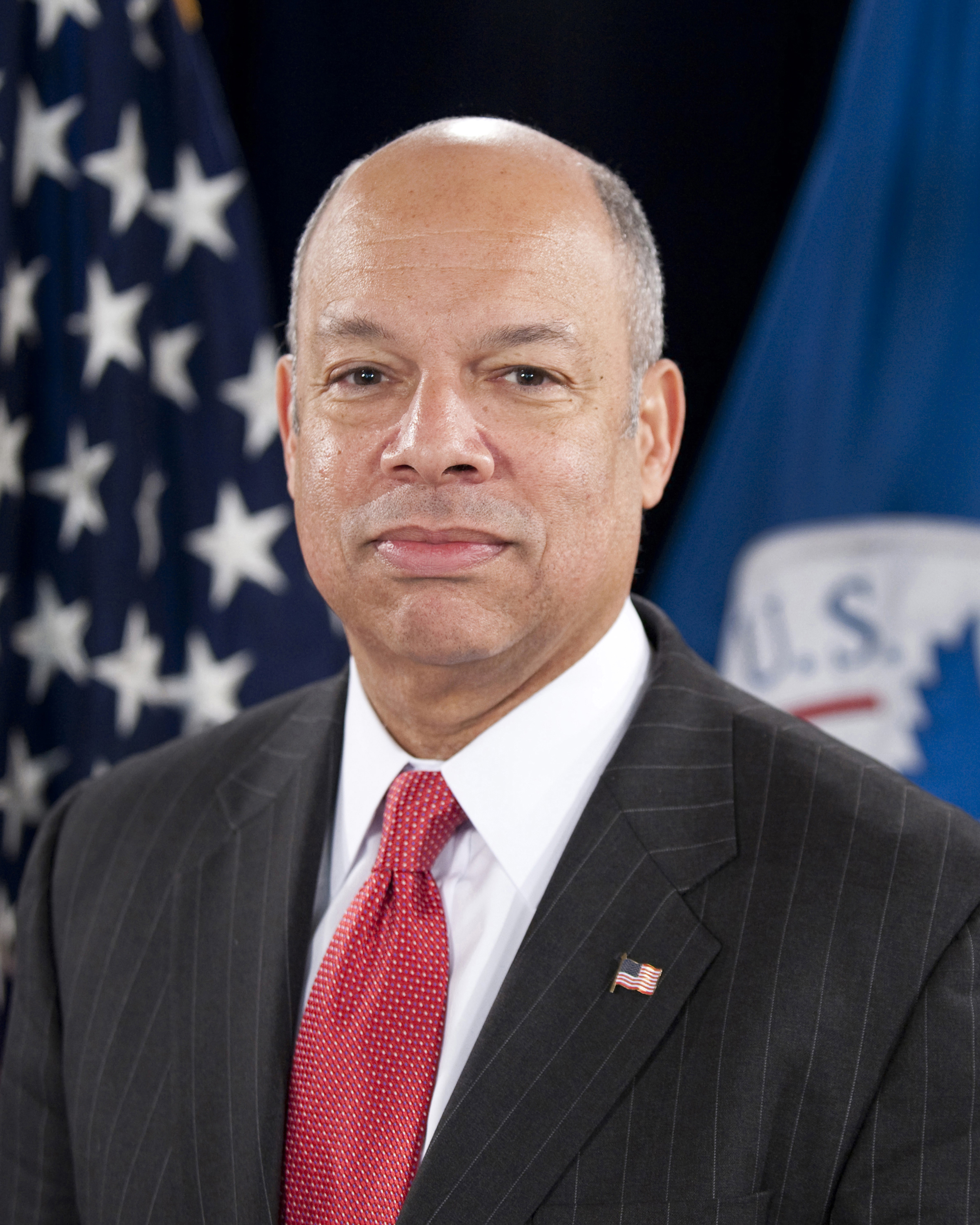
Jeh Johnson

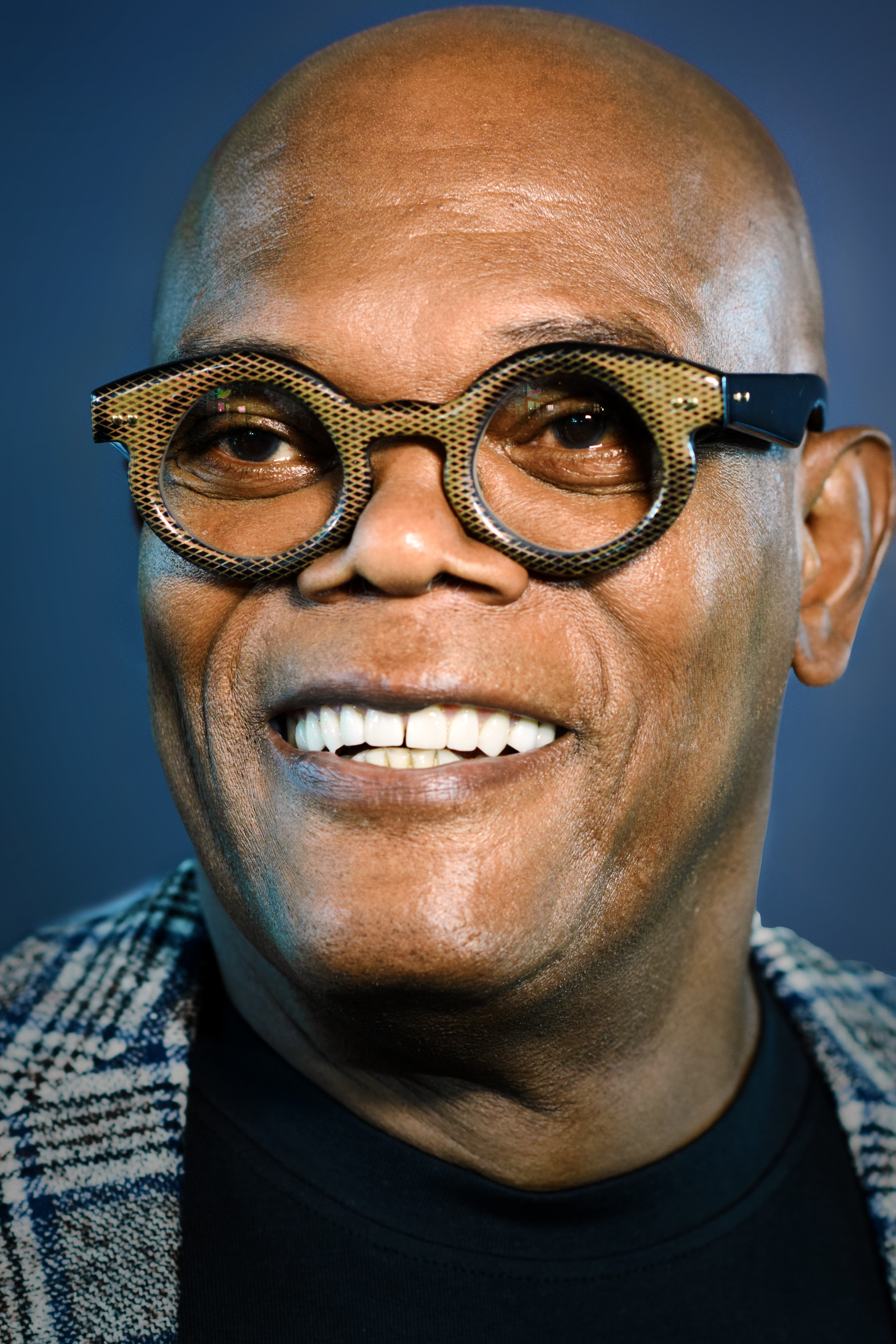
Samuel L. Jackson

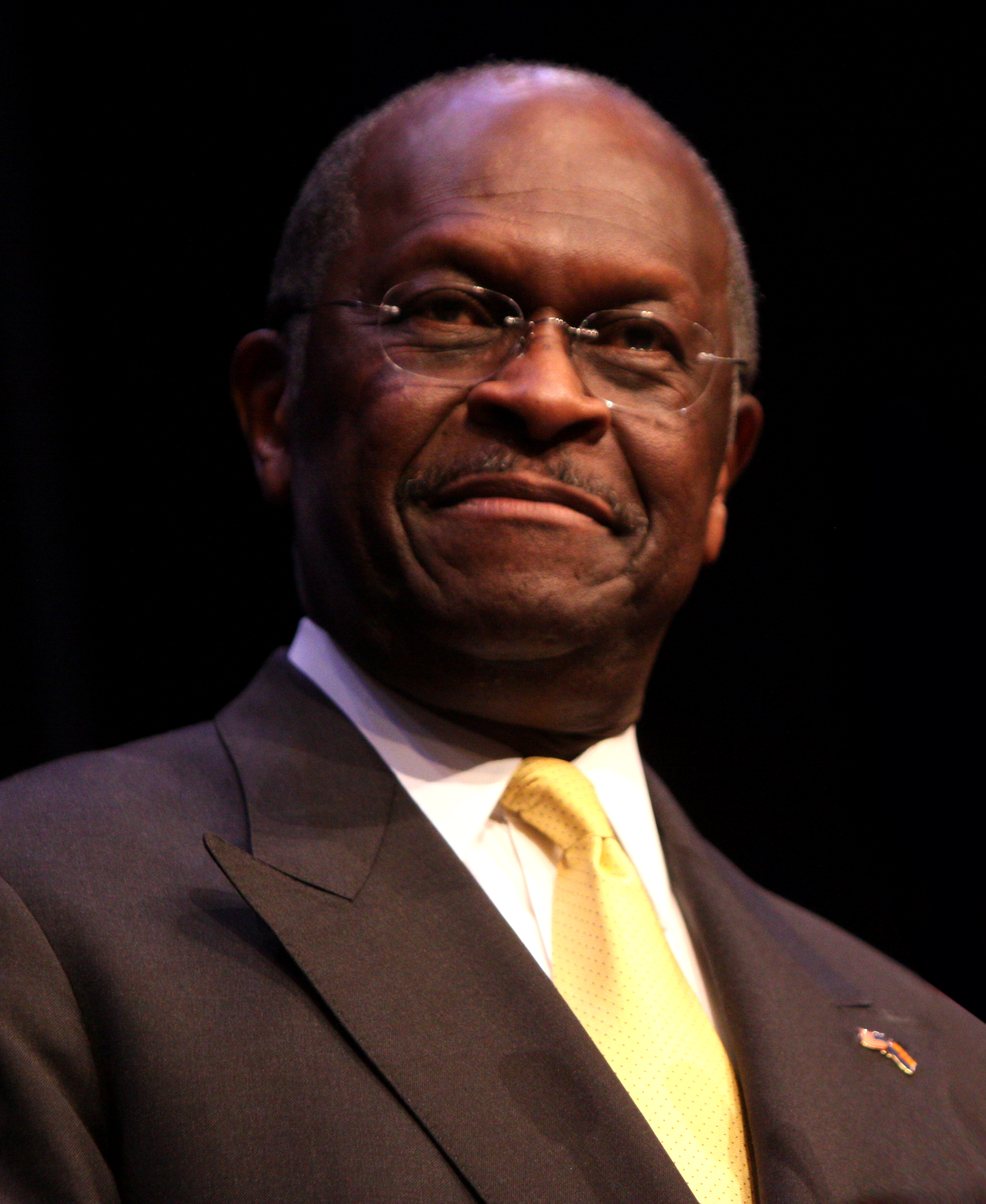
Herman Cain

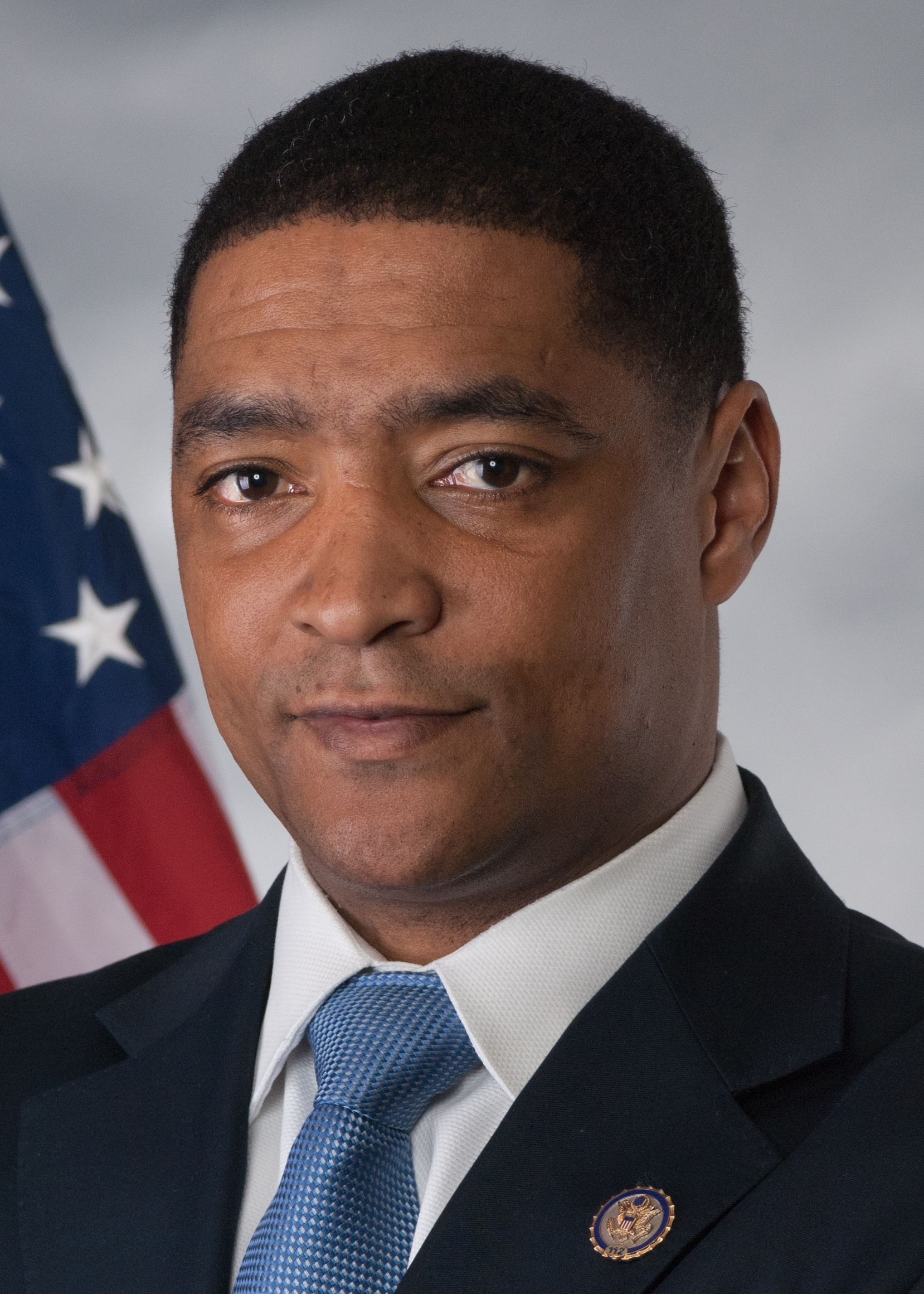
Cedric Richmond

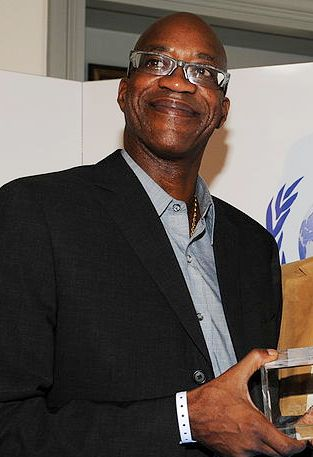
Edwin Moses

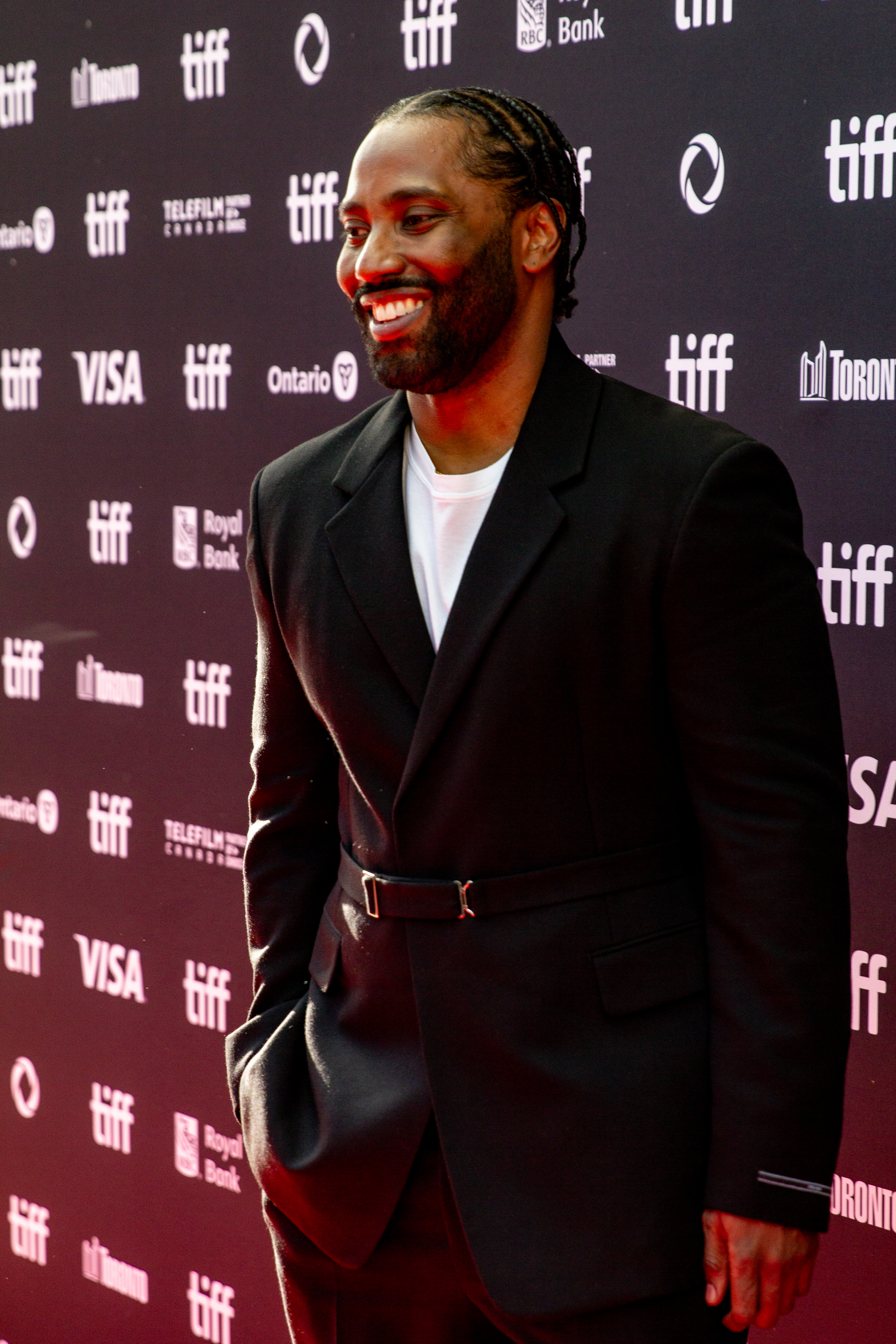
John David Washington

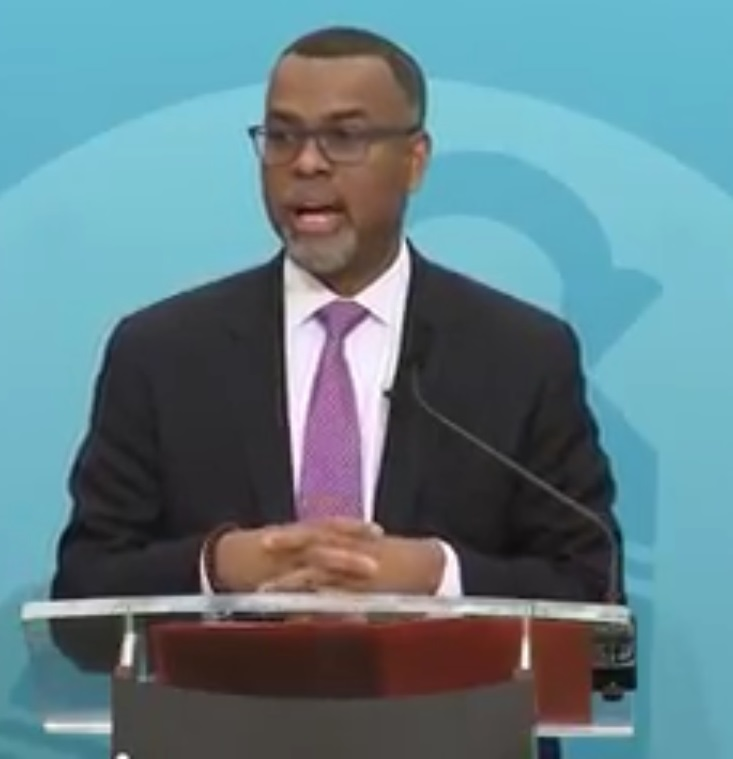
Eddie Glaude

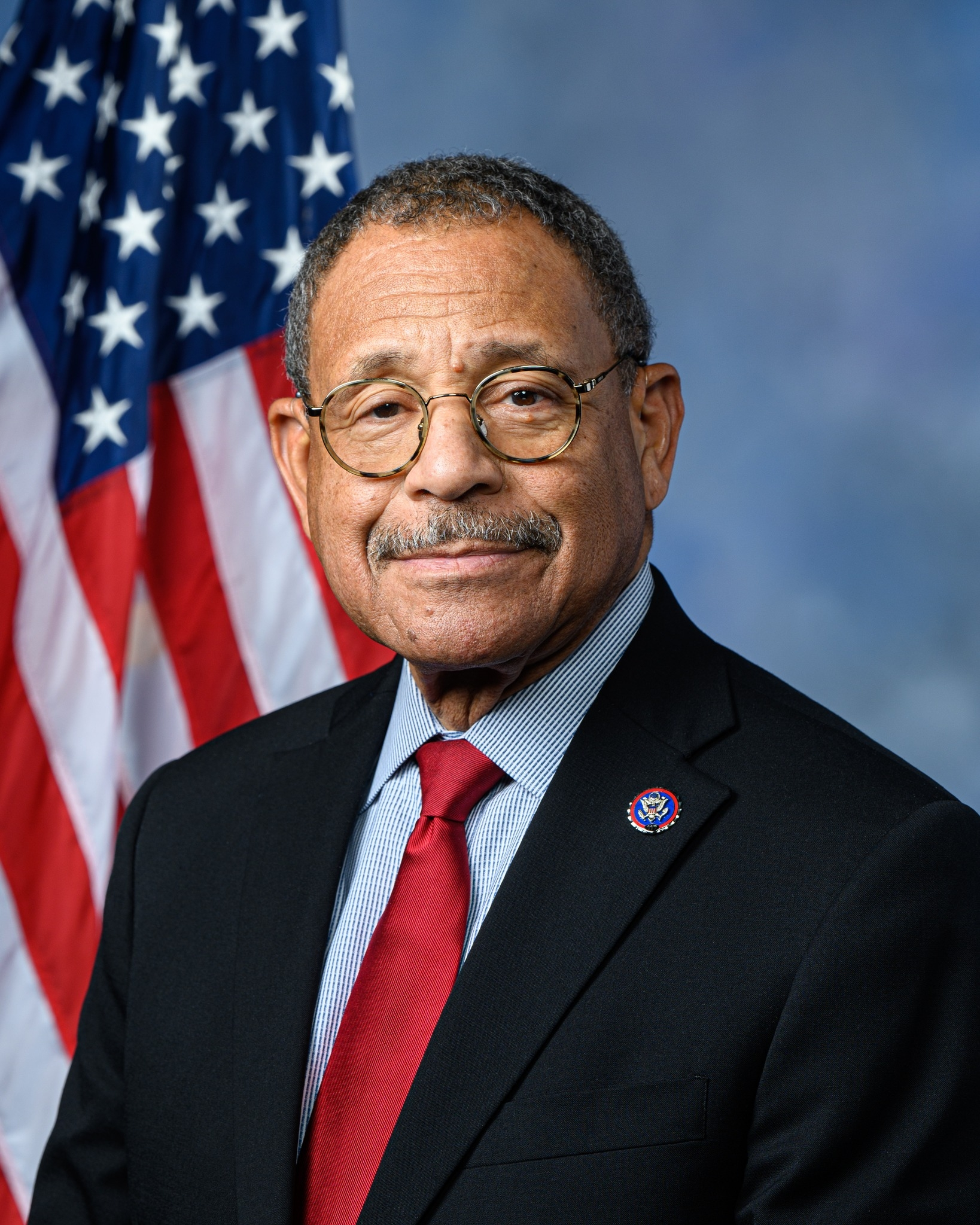
Sanford Bishop

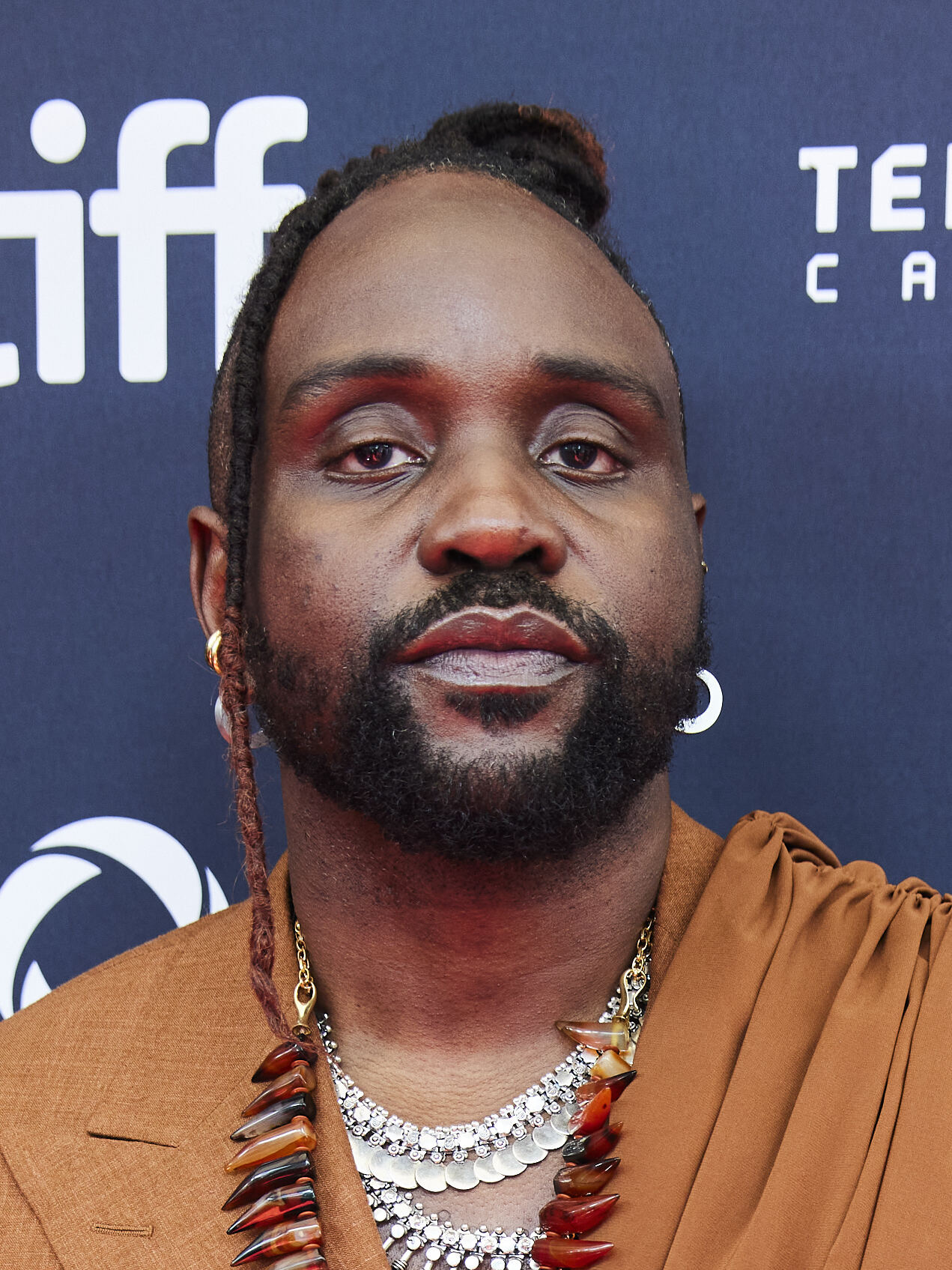
Brian Tyree Henry

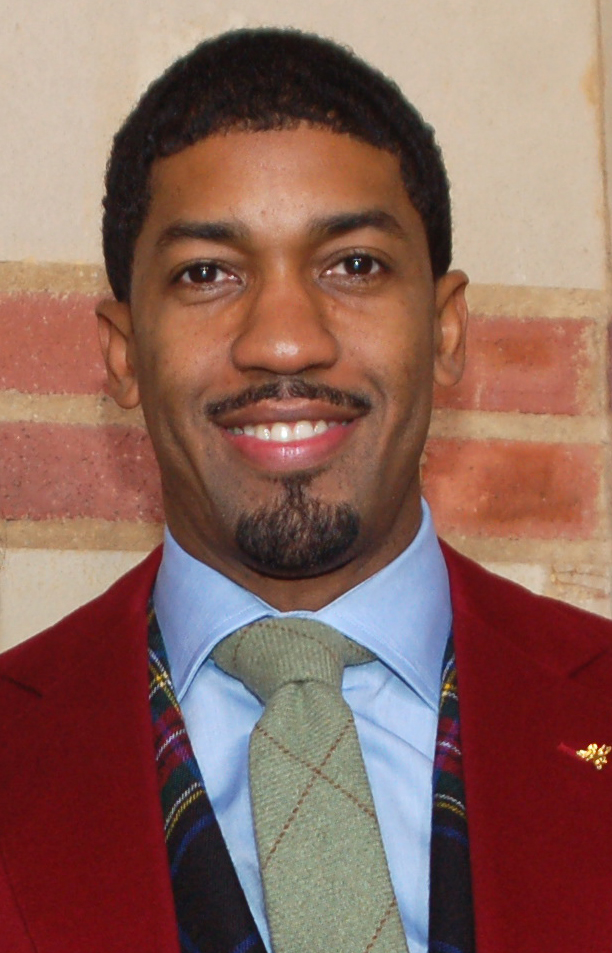
Fonzworth Bentley

== Oprah Winfrey Scholars ==
In 1990, Oprah Winfrey pledged to put 100 deserving young men through Morehouse. She made a donation to establish the "Oprah Winfrey Endowed Scholarship Fund". The school uses the fund to select deserving students based on academic achievement and financial need. Selected students are deemed "Oprah Scholars." Their financial support covers most of the costs of their education including prior student debt. Recipients must maintain their grade point average and provide additional volunteer support to the community.

In 2004, Winfrey increased her donation by $5 million for a total donation of $12 million. The fund has since supported more than 400 students. In 2011, several hundred Oprah Scholars surprised Winfrey by showing up at her final TV show carrying candles to thank her for her generosity. They, in turn, pledged $300,000 to help educate future Morehouse students.

In 2019, Winfrey added $13 million to the scholarship program bringing her grand total donations to $25 million.

== Gandhi King Ikeda Awards ==
Lawrence Carter, Professor of Religion and Dean of the Martin Luther King Jr. International Chapel at Morehouse College, founded the MLK Chapel Assistants Pre-seminarians Program. He commissioned the Gandhi Ikeda King Hassan Institute for Ethics and Reconciliation in 1999, and created the Gandhi–King–Ikeda Community Builder's Prize of the Morehouse Chapel in 2001. Named after Mahatma Gandhi (1869–1948), Martin Luther King Jr. (1929–1968), and Daisaku Ikeda (1928–2023), Morehouse's MLK Chapel awards the Gandhi, King, Ikeda Community Builders Prizes as well as the Gandhi King Ikeda Awards for Peace.
