= Henry Plummer (disambiguation) =

Henry Plummer (1832–1864) was a prospector, lawman, and outlaw in the American West.

Henry Plummer may also refer to:

- Henry Stanley Plummer (1874–1936), internist and endocrinologist who co-founded the Mayo Clinic
- Henry V. Plummer (1844–1905), Baptist preacher and chaplain with the US Army Buffalo soldiers
- H. Vinton Plummer (1876–?), American lawyer and civil rights activist
- Henry Crozier Keating Plummer (1875–1946), English astronomer
- Henry Waite Plummer (1771–1847), planter, slave-owner and politician in Jamaica

== See also ==
- Henry P. Cheatham (Henry Plummer Cheatham, 1857–1935), educator, farmer and politician from North Carolina
- Henry Plumer McIlhenny (1910–1986), American connoisseur of art and antiques, curator and chairman of the Philadelphia Museum of Art
- Harry Plummer (disambiguation)
