= Charles Henry Corey =

Canadian Baptist clergyman

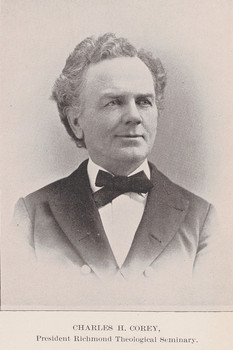
- Born: December 12, 1834; New Canaan, New Brunswick
- Died: September 5, 1899 (aged 64); Seabrook, New Hampshire
- Spouse: Fannie Sanborn (1865–1899, his death)
- Children: 2

Charles Henry Corey (1834–1899) was a Canadian Baptist clergyman.

== Biography ==
Corey was born at New Canaan, New Brunswick on 12 December 1834. He graduated from Acadia College in Wolfville, Nova Scotia, in 1858, and from Newton Theological Seminary in 1861. He served as pastor of the First Baptist Church in Seabrook, New Hampshire, from 1861 until the beginning of 1864, when he resigned to enter the service of the United States Christian Commission for the remainder of the United States Civil War. He previously accepted a commission with the USCC when he accompanied the 2nd New Hampshire Volunteer Regiment to Virginia in the summer of 1862. Following brief service in Texas and the Lower Mississippi, he served the remainder of the war in Morris Island and Charleston, South Carolina Following the war, he was a missionary among the freedmen of South Carolina. In 1867 he was appointed principal of the Augusta Institute, Augusta, Georgia, which went on to become Morehouse College and the following year was transferred to Richmond, Virginia, as president of the Richmond Theological Institute for the training of African-American preachers and teachers. He retired in 1898 to Seabrook and died the following year of Bright's disease.

== Richmond Theological Seminary ==
In 1867, a Richmond campus of the National Theological Institute was established by Dr. Nathaniel Colver of the American Baptist Home Mission Society. Colver died shortly thereafter, and the newly renamed Colver Institute was taken over by Corey. The school was renamed again as the Richmond Theological Seminary (also called Institute) which Charles Corey headed for 30 years. In the 1890s, Corey was instrumental in the merging of the Richmond Theological Seminary with the Wayland Seminary to form Virginia Union University. In 1895, Corey wrote a history of the school. He retired in 1898. The L. Douglas Wilder Library and Learning Resource Center holds the records of the Richmond Theological Seminary which includes Corey's personal and business correspondence.
