= Charles Corey =

Charles Corey may refer to:

- Charles Henry Corey (1834–1899), Canadian Baptist clergyman
- Nels Corey (Charles Nelson Corey Jr., 1915–2013), American football coach
- Charles Corey (politician), see Frank D. O'Connor
- Charles Corey (editor) of British Journal of Photography

== See also ==
- Charles Corri (1861–1941), English musician
- Charles B. Cory (1857–1921), American ornithologist and golfer
