= George Rice Hovey =

American university president (1860–1943)

President of Wayland Seminary
- In office 1897–1899

President of Virginia Union University
- In office 1904–1918
- Preceded by: Malcolm MacVicar

Personal details
- Born: January 17, 1860 Newton Center, Massachusetts, U.S.
- Died: January 17, 1943 (aged 83) Montclair, New Jersey, U.S.
- Education: Brown University, Newton Theological Institute
- Occupation: University president, professor, minister, author

Rev. George Rice Hovey (January 17, 1860 – January 17, 1943) was an American university president, professor, minister, and author. He served as the President of Wayland Seminary from 1897 to 1899; and as the President of Virginia Union University (VUU) from 1904 to 1918. Hovey taught theology, Hebrew, New Testament Greek, and philosophy. In his late career he worked to create an extension course for Black ministers. He was also known as George Hovey Rice.

== Early life and education ==
George Rice Hovey was born on January 17, 1860, in Newton Centre, Massachusetts, to parents Augusta M. (née Rice) and Alvah Hovey. His brother was tennis player Frederick Hovey. His father Alvah Hovey was a professor of theology and president of the Newton Theological Institute.

He graduated with a B.A. degree (1882) from Brown University, where he competed as a baseball athlete. Hovey was awarded the Foster Prize in Greek studies. He continued his studies at Newton Theological Institute (Andover Newton Theological School) where he graduated with a degree (1885).

Hovey also received honorary degrees from Temple University (1901) and Brown University (1902).

== Career ==
In 1887, Hovey taught Hebrew at Yale Hebrew Summer School (a part of Yale University). Followed by teaching at Richmond Theological Seminary (later known as Richmond Theological Institute), where he taught New Testament Greek and Hebrew from 1887 to 1897. He was appointed the President of Wayland Seminary from 1897 to 1899. By 1899, the Richmond Theological Institute of Richmond, Virginia, and the Wayland Seminary of Washington, D.C. merged into Virginia Union University of Richmond, Virginia.

Hovey was a professor of theology and philosophy at Virginia Union University from 1899 until 1905. Hovey succeeded Malcolm MacVicar, Virginia Union University's first president, after his death in 1904. He acquired land in 1907 for the Virginia Union University's athletic program. Hovey Park is now known as Hovey Field. Multiple newspapers reported on an educational tour in 1912 Hovey took in the North.

From 1919 until 1930, Hovey served as Secretary for Education of the American Baptist Home Mission Society, from 1919 to 1930; and from 1930 until he retired in 1935 was Director of the National Ministers Institute. After his retirement, Hovey created an extension course for Black ministers.

Hovey wrote multiple books, including a Hebrew textbook in 1902; a book about his late-father's life (1928); and multiple books on the Christian religion including his book, "Christian Ethics for Daily Life" (1932).

Hovey died on January 17, 1943, at his home in Montclair, New Jersey.

== Publications ==
- Hovey, George Rice (1902). A Hebrew Word-Book for Study and Classroom. Richmond, VA: Virginia Baptist Pub. Co.
- Hovey, George Rice (1928). Alvah Hovey, His Life and Letters. Judson Press.
- Hovey, George Rice (1932). Christian Ethics for Daily Life. Association Press.
- Hovey, George Rice (1933). Christian Teaching.
- Hovey, George Rice (1935). Bible Study: A Natural Method Illustrated.
