= Nellie Arnold Plummer =

American former slave, teacher and writer

Nellie Plummer
- Born: September 7, 1860; Ellicott's Mills, Maryland
- Died: 1933 (aged 72–73); Hyattsville, Maryland
- Occupations: Teacher, Author

Nellie Arnold Plummer (September 7, 1860 to 1933) was a former slave who became the first female student to attend the Normal Department of Wayland Seminary in Washington, D.C. She subsequently worked as a teacher for over forty-five years and published Out of the Depths, or the Triumph of the Cross, a notable biography of her family in 1927. Literary scholar Joanne M. Braxton describes Out of the Depths as a "'crossover' text bearing aspects of folklore, autobiography, and biography."

== Family ==
Plummer's father was Adam Francis Plummer (1819–1905). Her mother was Emily Saunders Plummer (c1815-1876). The two were married in 1841. After 1855, the two began a series of correspondence that is collected in Out of the Depths. One of her brothers was Baptist preacher and US Army Buffalo Soldier, Henry Vinton Plummer, Sr. Henry's son, Henry Vinton Plummer, Jr. was a lawyer who would become involved in black nationalism in New York and Virginia.

== Out of the Depths, or the Triumph of the Cross, 1927 ==
Plummer mortgaged $1000 worth of her family's land in order to publish Out of the Depths, or the Triumph of the Cross in 1927. The book traces the history of Plummer's family in Prince George’s County, Maryland beginning with her great grandfather Cupid Plummer, who served as a soldier in the American revolution. In 1790, the first US census listed Cupid as free, and in 1797, his wife and children were emancipated. Relationships like these between free and enslaved blacks were not uncommon in the United States. But because the condition of children followed that of the mother, the descendants of many free blacks were enslaved. One of these enslaved descendants of Cupid Plummer was Adam Francis Plummer, Nellie's father. From 1841 to 1905, Adam kept a diary that ended up running to 200 pages. Nellie draws heavily on her father's diary in Out of the Depths. Her publication of this history scandalized family members, who neither wanted to recall nor be reminded of their past. Nevertheless, the book became a treasured possession for families who owned copies and frequently referred to Out of the Depths simply as "The Book."
