= Harry Plummer =

Harry Plummer may refer to:

- Harry Plummer (Australian footballer)
- Harry Plummer (rugby union)

== See also ==
- Henry Plummer (disambiguation)
- Harold Plummer, English footballer
