= Henry N. Jeter =

American former slave, minister, and activist

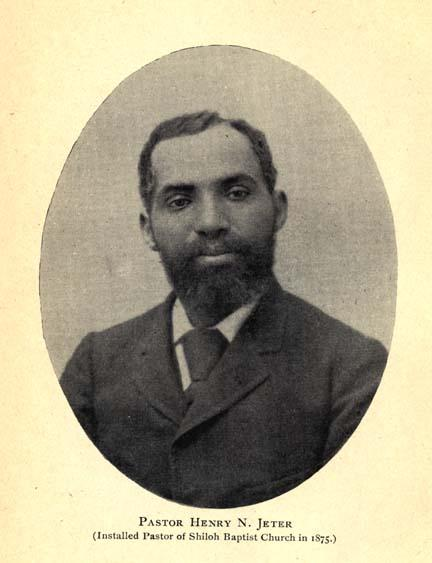
- Jeter in 1901
- Born: October 7, 1851; Charlotte County, Virginia
- Died: August 4, 1938 (aged 86); Newport, Rhode Island, United States
- Education: Wayland Seminary
- Occupation: Minister (Christianity)
- Political party: Republican

Religious life
- Religion: Baptist

Henry N. Jeter (October 7, 1851 – August 4, 1938) was a Baptist minister and social justice activist from Newport, Rhode Island. He was minister at Shiloh Baptist Church in Newport for 42 years before founding a pair of organizations seeking to aid poor, urban African Americans, the Pastors and Laymen's Humane and Reform Association and the Jeter Movement of Race Relations and Social Service.

== Early life ==
Henry Norval Jeter was born a slave in Charlotte County, Virginia on October 7, 1851, to Riland and Mary Jeter. In 1862, Riland was pressed to help build breastworks for the Confederate Army during the American Civil War (1861–1865). Later that year Riland was shot and killed by a soldier After the Emancipation Proclamation, Henry served as a shoemaker apprentice and attended night school in Lynchburg, Virginia. In 1868 he joined the Baptist religion, being baptized by Rev. Sampson White. He felt called to preach, and in 1869 he entered Wayland Seminary in Washington, D.C., under Rev. George Mellen Prentiss King.

== Move to Newport ==
Jeter was invited on January 8, 1875, to preach to the Shiloh Baptist Church in Newport, Rhode Island after the resignation of its previous pastor, Ananias Brown. Shiloh had been founded May 10, 1863, by Rev. Edmund Kelly. Jeter was ordained June 24, 1875, at Shiloh and made its pastor by a council including Kelly and others.

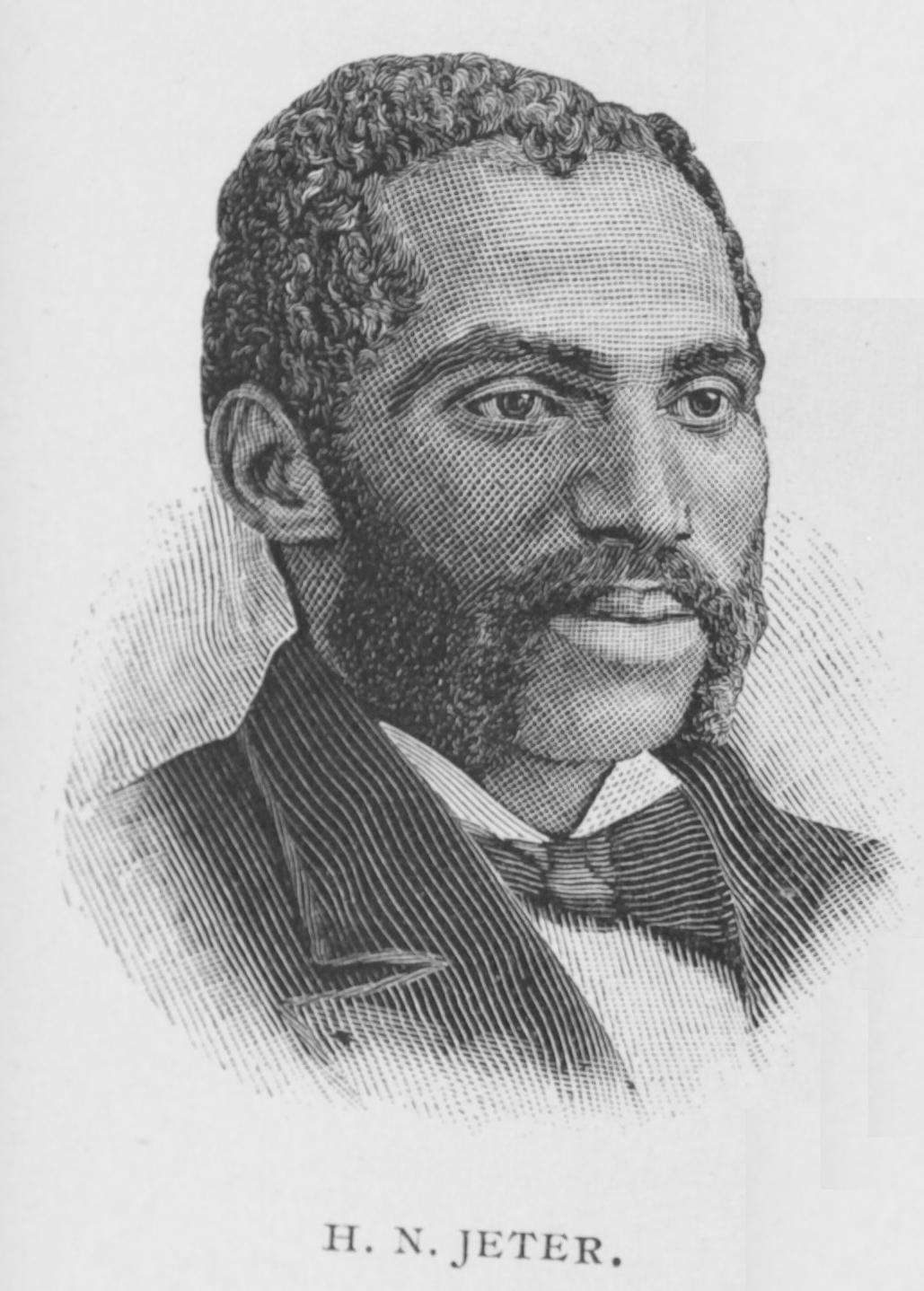
Jeter in 1887

In 1894, Jeter was a financial agent for the Wayland Seminary, collecting donations for the school. His work exhausted him, and he was advised to rest. He invited evangelist Joseph Murphy from Congdon Street Baptist Church in Providence to replace him during his vacation. On Jeter's return, Murphy sought to remain as pastor, and the case was put before a state council of Baptist ministers, who retained Jeter. Murphy sued Jeter for slander, but the case was thrown out.

== Expanded role ==
Jeter became a prominent leader in the national Baptist church and African American civil rights organizations. He was a founding member of the New England Baptist Convention. He was also a member of the National Afro-American League. In 1903 he attended the National Baptist convention in Philadelphia. He was also active in the Republican Party, participating in city Republican Convention in 1903. In 1904 he was awarded an honorary degree of doctor of divinity by Guadalupe College of Seguin, Texas.

== Aid organizations ==
On July 2, 1916, Jeter offered his resignation as pastor to take place after three months so that he could devote his time to other causes. That August he created an organization called the Pastors and Laymen's Humane and Reform Association for the improvement of the condition of blacks in big cities. His organization was initially supported by Robert Heberton Terrell, H. M. King, O. P Gifford, Clark Burdick, Bishop Rhinelander, Bishop Perry, Dr. Puller, and Watt Terry. Jeter was active in his organization and received broad support. In 1917, he presented on the group to the New England African Methodist Episcopal conference and was endorsed by that body. In 1922, he toured the Pacific Coast giving speeches and taking donations. In 1924, he took a similar tour of Middle Atlantic states and in 1927 he made a tour of the South.

In 1928, his focused shifted slightly, and he incorporated the Jeter Movement of Race Relations and Social Service along with Rufus L. Perry, Clinton Stevens, Mitchel Klupt, Francis W. Mandell Jr., Henry Barton Jacobs, Charles H. Brooks, and George W. Bacheller. This group would focus on black migrants from the South to the North.

== Family and death ==
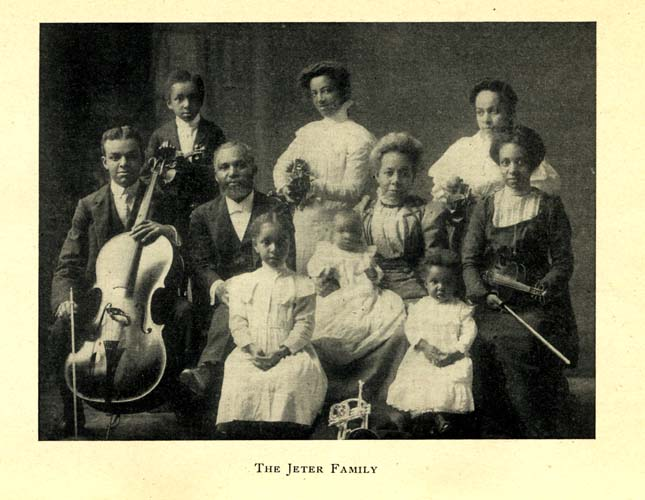
Jeter Family in 1901

In 1878 he married Thomasinia Hamilton, daughter of Thomas Hamilton, the editor of the influential New York City newspaper, the Anglo-African. They had twelve children, five sons and six daughters: Octavia, Leonard, Hiram, Nellie, Susie, Walter, May, Mary, Francis, Willie, Olive and Paul. The Jeter family was noted for their musical talent, and gave numerous concerts. Thomasina was an officer in the Northeastern Federation of Colored Women's Club and president of the Josephine Silone Yates Mothers' Club in Newport. She was also a member of the Women's Newport League, the Newport Women's Missionary Alliance, and Hope of Circle of Kings Daughters. She accompanied Henry on many of his tours and was active in many other community works. She died November 19, 1931, in Newport.

Henry died August 4, 1938, at his home in Newport. His funeral was held at his home led by Thomas B. Livingston, and he was buried in the City cemetery.

== Bibliography ==
- Jeter, Henry Norval. Pastor Henry N. Jeter's Twenty-five Years Experience with the Shiloh Baptist Church and Her History: Corner School and Mary Streets. Remington Printing Company, 1901, accessed November 3, 2016
