= Peter Kostacopoulos =

American baseball and football coach (1934–2021)

Biographical details
- Born: April 25, 1934; Pawtucket, Rhode Island, U.S.
- Died: March 25, 2021 (aged 86); Putnam, Connecticut, U.S.
- Education: University of Maine

Coaching career (HC unless noted)

Football
- 1957–1958: Deering HS (ME) (asst.)
- 1959–1964: Bowdoin (line)
- 1965–1967: Bowdoin
- 1968–1986: Wesleyan (DC)

Baseball
- 1974–2001: Wesleyan

Head coaching record
- Overall: 7–15 (football); 478–304–7 (baseball)

Peter Kostacopoulos (April 25, 1934 – March 25, 2021) was an American baseball and football coach who was the head football coach at Bowdoin College from 1965 to 1967 and the head baseball coach at Wesleyan University from 1974 to 2001.

== Early life ==
Kostacopoulos was born in Pawtucket, Rhode Island and attended the Maine Central Institute. He attended the University of Maine, where he lettered in football, basketball, and baseball and captained the football and basketball teams.

== Career ==
After graduating, Kostacopoulos became an assistant football and basketball coach at Deering High School in Portland, Maine. In 1959, he became the line coach at Bowdoin College. When head coach Nels Corey resigned in 1965, Kostacopoulos was chosen to succeed him. Over three seasons, he amassed a 7–15 record. He resigned in 1968 to become an assistant coach at Wesleyan University.

In 1973, Kostacopoulos was named Wesleyan's head baseball coach, succeeding Norm Daniels, who retired after 33 years. Under Kostacopoulos, the Cardinals posted a 478–304–7 record and won 11 Little Three titles. His 1994 team went 30–8 and made it to the finals of that year's NCAA Division III baseball tournament. He retired in 2001.

== Honors ==
Kostacopoulos was inducted into the University of Maine Sports Hall of Fame in 1995 and the Wesleyan Cardinals Hall of Fame in 2016.

== Personal life ==
Kostacopoulos and his wife, Joann, had three sons, two of whom, Peter and Paul, are also baseball coaches. Kostacopoulos died on March 25, 2021 at Day Kimball Hospital. He was a resident of Thompson, Connecticut at the time of his death.
