= Charles B. W. Gordon Sr. =

American minister, journalist, publisher (1861–1941)

Charles B.W. Gordon Sr.
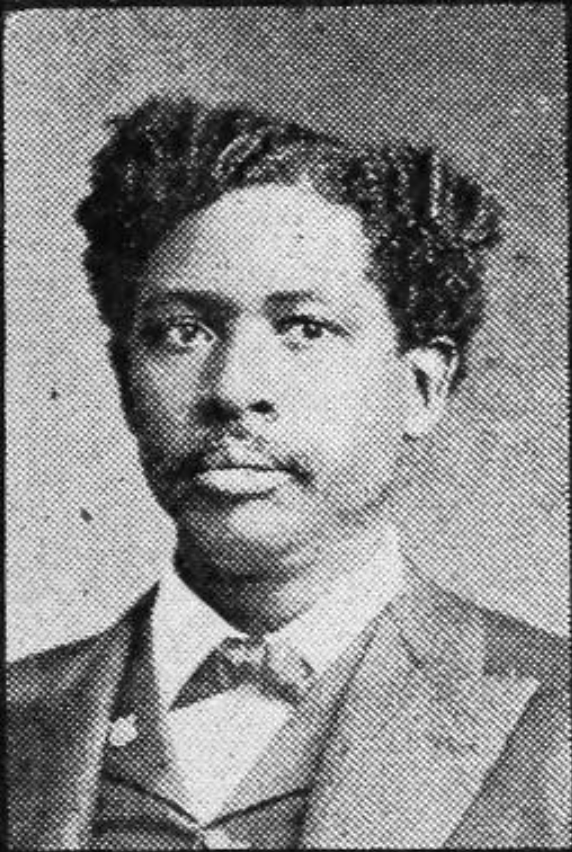
- Charles B. W. Gordon Sr., c. 1890
- Born: Charles Benjamin William Gordon; November 1, 1861; Colerian, Bertie County, North Carolina, United States
- Died: September 15, 1941 (aged 89); Petersburg City, Virginia, United States
- Burial place: Little Church Street Cemetery, Petersburg City, Virginia, United States
- Education: Richmond Theological Seminary, Virginia Union University
- Occupation(s): Newspaper publisher, journalist, writer, Baptist minister

Rev. Charles Benjamin William Gordon Sr. (1861–1941) was an American newspaper publisher, author, journalist, and Baptist minister. He was the publisher and editor of The National Pilot (The Pilot), a Baptist weekly newspaper published in Petersburg, Virginia.

== Biography ==
Charles Benjamin William Gordon was born on November 1, 1861, in Colerian, Bertie County, North Carolina. He attended education classes with Thomas Mixon in Roanoke Island, North Carolina.

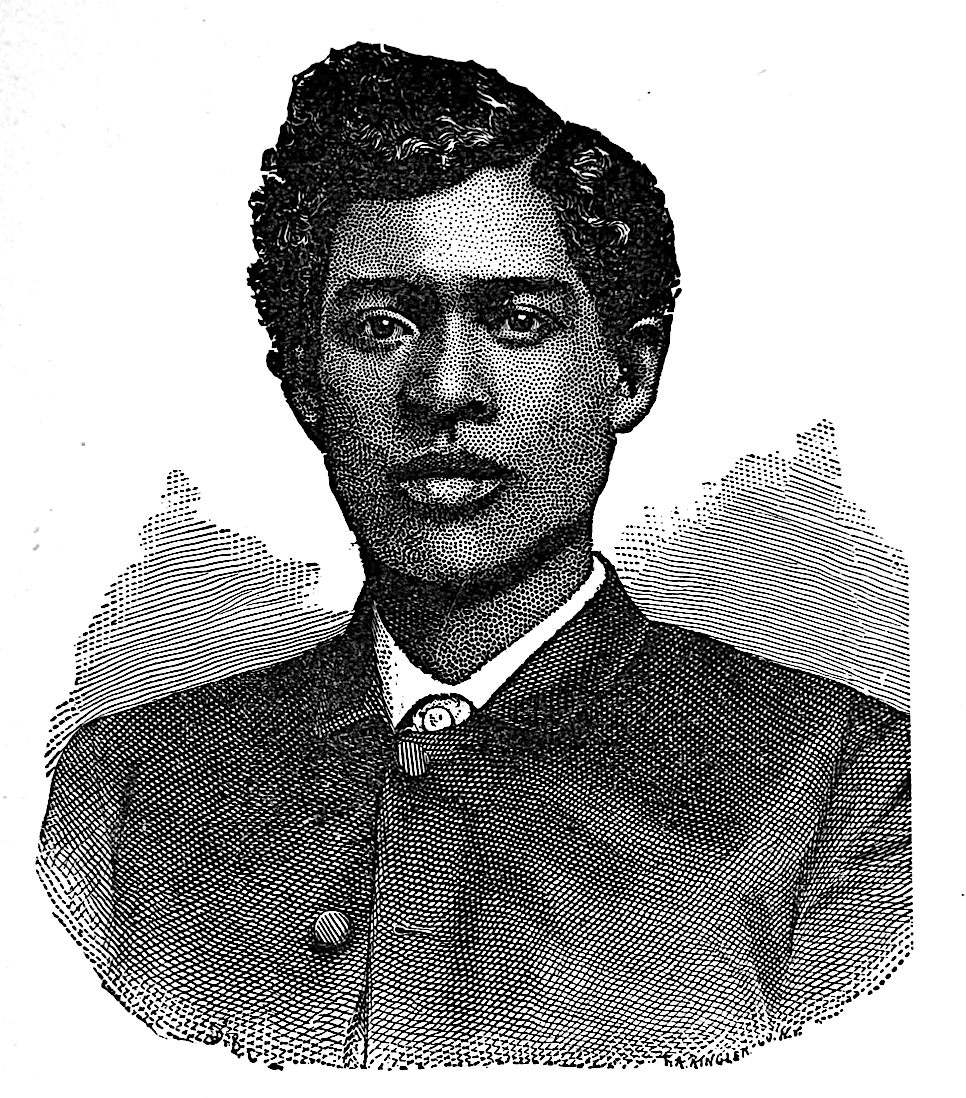
Charles B. W. Gordon Sr.

From 1881 to 1884, Gordon attended the Richmond Theological Seminary (now Richmond Theological Institute) in Richmond, Virginia, which later merged in 1899 to form the Virginia Union University.

On May 1888, Gordon launched The Pilot, and served as the editor and publisher. After The Baptist Companion from Portsmouth, Virginia stopped publication, The Pilot was used as an organ during the Virginia Baptist State Convention.

He was the pastor at one of the largest congregations, at the First Baptist Church in Petersburg, Virginia. In 1890, he founded Tabernacle Baptist Church in Petersburg. He died on September 15, 1941, in Petersburg City, Virginia, and is buried at Little Church Street Cemetery.

A profile of Gordon is included in the books, The Afro-American Press and Its Editors (1891), and Who's Who Among the Colored Baptists of the United States (1890).
