= Leonard Black =

American slave and author (1820–1883)

- Born: March 8, 1820; Anne Arundel County, Maryland
- Died: April 28, 1883 (aged 63); Petersburg, Virginia
- Occupations: Minister, author
- Known for: The Life and Sufferings of Leonard Black, a Fugitive from Slavery
- Spouses: Mary A. Black (1838/1842 - ca. post 1850, her death); Mary Anne Wheeden (ca. 1859 - 1883, his death)
- Children: 7 children (5 with Mary A., 2 with Mary Anne)

Leonard Black (March 8, 1820 – April 28, 1883) was born a slave in Anne Arundel County, Maryland, and was separated from his family by the age of six. He escaped after 20 years of slavery. In 1847 he wrote The Life and Sufferings of Leonard Black: A Fugitive from Slavery. With encouragement and support, he became a Baptist minister, preaching in Boston, Providence, and Nantucket before becoming minister of First Baptist Church in Petersburg, Virginia.

Black married twice in his lifetime. The first marriage was to a woman named Mary A. Black, a woman who died at some point in time after 1850 and with whom Black had five children. Her father, George Black, was an African-American Baptist minister who took him into his home after he escaped slavery and helped him become established. Black's second marriage was to Mary Anne Wheeden, with whom he had two children.

== Early life ==
Black was born a slave, the youngest of five boys. He also had a sister. The family's master was a physician. At the age of six, Leonard was sold to a carpenter named Bradford and was separated from his parents and siblings. His mother and sister were sold away to people in New Orleans. His four brothers were also "placed out". Mrs. Bradford, his mistress, was brutal. After two years and fearing that he would be killed by his wife when he was out of town, Mr. Bradford gave the boy to his father, a senior Mr. Bradford, where he served until Mr. Bradford's death.

He was abused, beaten, burned, fed little and had no personal possessions. At one point, he said: "During this time I had no hat, no pantaloons, but one pair of shoes, and wore a lindsey slip only." He felt he was "owned like a cow or horse".

When Black was 13 years old, the elder Mr. Bradford died and with the rest of his property, the boy was inherited by the man's daughter, Elizabeth Bradford who married a quick-tempered man named Gardner. Throughout his enslavement he endured hunger, beatings and harsh treatment. Black was beaten, among other times, when he acquired books to learn to read.

Black returned to his "old master" and met up with his four brothers. The three oldest boys ran away soon after his return; 6 months later Black ran away but was returned and spent about another 10 years in slavery. His brother Nicholas remained in slavery with him. At times his situation was alleviated by the intervention of the man's son, a preacher. Black related his experiences with some of the people in the Bible and found strength in the verse "I experienced a hope under a slave man" and "Give us of your oil, for our lamps have gone out." He converted to Christianity in 1836.

== Freedom ==
=== Maine ===
In 1837, after 20 years enslavement, Black decided to escape and go north to meet up with his three brothers; He thought his family was either in Boston, Massachusetts, or Canada. He believed he had the support of his friend Henry, but Henry informed his master that Black had escaped. Black left with 75¢ and the clothes he was wearing. He traveled to Boston, working odd jobs to earn money for food. He resisted attempts to be captured throughout his travels. In Boston he was told that there was a man named George Black, a Baptist minister from the West Indies, in Portland, Maine, but when he arrived he found that he was not related to Mr. Black. George Black and his family were kind to him; Mrs. Black was like a mother to him and he became attached to the couple's daughter. Clothes were made for him and he attended school to learn to read and write. In the spring he went to work for a farmer named Major Purley. He returned to Portland, lived with George Black and his family and worked as an engineer at a steam factory.

=== Boston ===
When George Black and his family moved to Boston to become minister of the African Meeting House on Belknap Street, Leonard went with them. George was the minister of the Meeting House from 1838 to 1840.

== Family and church life ==
=== 1840 to 1856 ===
==== Boston ====
By 1840, Black married the daughter of George Black and lived with George in Boston. They also lived at the house of David Walker, the abolitionist, on Joy Street. Over the course of their marriage, the couple had five children, one of whom died in childhood. Black worked at the wharfs and became a member of the Belknap Street church.

==== Providence ====
After five years in Boston, Black moved to Providence, Rhode Island. He first studied with Francis Wayland, president of Brown University, and became an active member and student of religion at the Meetinghouse Street Church, organized as a Baptist Church and at that time led by Rev. Jeremiah Ashur, then the African Union Meeting and Schoolhouse. He was invited "to officiate for him one Sunday morning, as he knew I was accustomed to exhort when in Boston." He took up work as a stone mason and had his family join him in Providence. He then operated a canal boat from Providence to Woonsocket. During one of the canal runs he was seriously injured when a horse stumbled, fell upon him and slashed his face. He was brought home to his ill, pregnant wife. Unable to work, members of the community, including President Wayland, brought food to the family while he recovered.

==== Nantucket ====
After his accident, Black was determined to become a preacher. He traveled to Nantucket with a letter of recommendation from two Providence preachers for Deacon Berry. He preached at the York Street Baptist Church for several weeks.

==== Novel or slave narrative ====
In 1847 called The Life and Sufferings of Leonard Black: A Fugitive from Slavery. He wrote the book to inform Christians of what slavery was like in hopes of ending slavery which would free his fourth brother and earn enough money to pursue religious studies. His autobiography includes a poem entitled The Traveling Pilgrim and an essay on slavery.

Of slavery he began:

The slaves are taught ignorance as we teach our children knowledge. They are kept in darkness, and are borne down under a cruel, cruel oppression! All human rights are denied them as citizens! They are not recognized as men! My old master frequently said, "he did not believe a d--d nigger had any soul!" They are made to undergo everything as a beast. Having a full, perfect, undeniable right to stand out before God as MEN, the cruel, God-defying white man, without semblance of right, with no pretence [sic] but might, has prostituted them to the base purpose of his cupidity, and his baser beastly passions, reducing them to mere things, mere chattels, to be bought and sold like hogs and sheep! Born, like the white man, to an individual responsibility to the Father of mercies, the treatment of the white man to the poor African, unmixed with mercy, has curtained his mind to all knowledge, aye, even to the knowledge of the God of heaven and earth, and thus removed from him the accountability! But, where does this terrible accountability rest? Let the hardened slave-tyrant, when he stands quivering before the Almighty bar of retribution, answer this question! Well might Thomas Jefferson remark, when his deep, penetrating mind was reflecting upon the stupendous wrongs of slavery, "I tremble for my country, when I remember that God is just, and that his justice cannot slumber forever." I appeal, then, to every rational, intelligent mind, if slavery be not an abomination in the sight of the Lord.

==== Stonginton and Brooklyn churches ====
In 1850 Black was a Baptist minister at the Third Stonington Church in Stonington, Connecticut. There were 26 Sunday School students and 29 adult members, but nearly doubled to 59 before he left in 1851. He obtained a position at the Concord Baptist Church of Christ in Brooklyn, New York, in 1851, but left the position shortly after when the Fugitive Slave Act of 1850 was enacted that required escaped slaves to be returned to their owners.

Black was the minister of the Third Baptist Church in Williamsburg, Brooklyn, in 1855. The church was formed one year earlier and had 40 members.

=== 1860 to 1872 ===
In 1860, Black and his wife Mary Ann (Note: Mary Ann is reportedly Black's second wife, his first wife dying after 1850 and the couple marrying about 1859. So far, though, there is no reliable source for this information.) lived in New York. Children that were recorded to be living by themselves and next door were Elizabeth, Lydia, Charles, Georgiana and Mary, ages 18 to 5. Leonard was married to Mary Ann and living in New Haven, Connecticut in 1870. With them were Charles, Georgiana and Anna, ages 22 to 14. Ten years later, Leonard was married to Mary Ann, who was born about 1835 in St. Thomas.

Rev. Leonard Black was the Vice President of the Virginia Baptist State Convention in 1872, living in Norfolk.

=== 1873 to 1883 ===
Black moved to Virginia where in 1873 he was made pastor of the First Baptist Church, also known as Harrison Street Church, in Petersburg. He was successful in doubling the church's membership during his time, from 1900 to 3600 people. He preached there until his death. (Note: Julian Greene, church historian, said of Black: "He would go into the woods, escape and go into the woods and preach to the trees. But what he was preaching was what he had heard, not what he had read or knew about.")

In 1882 Black was interviewed and a biography was written from that interview.

== Death ==
He died on April 28, 1883. More than 5,000 people attended his memorial service, one of the largest funerals held in the city. "On the day of his funeral, every store that employed a black person closed." Funds were raised within months of his death for a stone monument with a bas-relief portrait to mark Black's burial site in the African-American cemetery now known as People's Memorial Cemetery in Petersburg.

== See also ==
- Slave narratives
- African-American literature
