= Thomas G. Keen =

American Baptist minister

Thomas G. Keen (also known as T. G. Keen, 1815–1887) was an American Baptist minister, whose pulpits included the Hopkinsville, Kentucky Baptist Church (circa 1845), the Walnut Street Baptist Church (Louisville, Kentucky) (1847–1849) and the Saint Francis Street Baptist Church in Mobile (beginning in 1849), the First Baptist Church (Petersburg, Virginia) (beginning around 1855), and the Hopkinsville again in 1864. Later he was president of the Female College in Hopkinsville, Kentucky.

Keen was born in Philadelphia in 1815 and studied at Hamilton College, 1834–38. In 1837 he attended the Baptist convention in Philadelphia when he was a resident of New Jersey. Keen delivered several speeches that were deemed important enough to be published, including "The Co-Operation of the Churches with the Ministry," Characteristics of the Times, Strong Incentives to Intellectual Effort, which was an address to the literary societies at Howard College (now Samford University) in Marion Alabama in 1850 and Elements of a Church's Prosperity: A Sermon, Delivered in the St. Francis St. Baptist Church, Mobile, November 18th, 1849. In 1860 he delivered a commencement address at Wake Forest in North Carolina. At that point he was a minister in Petersburg, Va.

He was married to Eleanor Jones and they had two daughters, Fannie Keen and Mary Lecock Keen Armistead (1841–1927). He died in 1887.
