= Henry V. Plummer =

American former slave and army chaplain

Henry Vinton Plummer
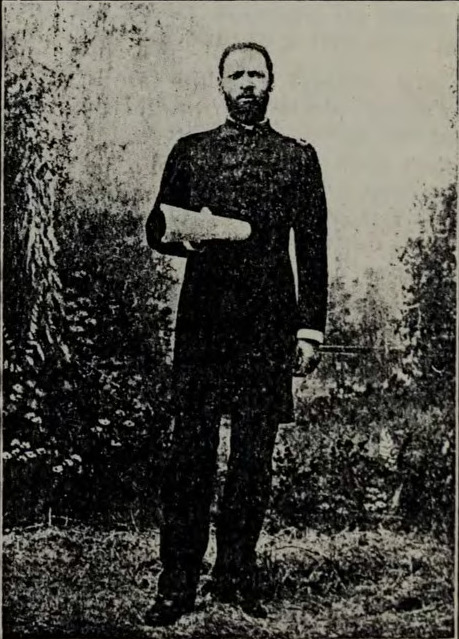
- Born: July 30, 1844; Three Sisters Plantation, near Bowie, Maryland
- Died: February 19, 1905 (aged 60); Kansas City, Kansas
- Resting place: National Harmony Memorial Park; Landover, Maryland
- Occupations: Baptist preacher, United States Army chaplain

Henry Vinton Plummer (July 30, 1844 – February 10, 1905) was an American Baptist preacher and chaplain with the United States Army Buffalo Soldiers. Born a slave on a plantation near Bowie, Maryland, he escaped slavery in his early 20s and enlisted in the Union Navy during the American Civil War. He served as a pastor at several churches before being appointed chaplain of the 9th Cavalry Regiment by President Chester A. Arthur in 1884. At that time, he was the only black officer in the US Army. In 1894 he was dishonorably discharged from the Army for drunkenness and poor conduct, but his discharge was upgraded to honorable after a review in 2005.

== Early life ==
Henry Vinton Plummer was born a slave July 30, 1844, on the Three Sisters Plantation near Bowie, Maryland, the property of Gilbert Livingston Thompson, who was the son of Smith Thompson. Plummer's father was Adam Francis Plummer and his mother was Emily Saunders Plummer and he had multiple sisters, including Sarah Miranda Plummer Clark and Nellie Arnold Plummer. He and his mother were sold in 1851, and in 1862, Plummer escaped from slavery and traveled to Riversdale Plantation in Prince George's County to find his father. He hid at Riversdale for a time, before he enlisted with the Union Navy during the American Civil War in 1864. He married and had multiple children, including H. Vinton Plummer.

== Pre-Army career ==
After the war, Plummer took a position as a coachman and gardener with B. F. Guy of Hyattsville. He also became involved in the politics and religious life of Washington DC's Maryland suburbs. In 1870, Plummer founded the Union Association of Bladensburg, Maryland. In 1871, he received an appointment as watchman for the US Postal Service in Washington DC.

In 1872, he enrolled at Wayland Seminary in Washington and when he graduated, became the pastor at St. Paul Baptist Church in Bladensburg, Maryland. He was pastor of St. Paul's from 1876 to 1881. In 1876, he was also a co-founder of Mount Carmel Church in Washington, DC. In 1882 he became the pastor of Mount Carmel Church, where he served until 1884.

In 1872 and 1876, Plummer was a representative for Prince George's county at the State Republican Convention. In 1882, he was a member of the executive committee of the Maryland Republican Association under president James S. Crawford. Plummer was a participant of the First Washington Baptist Association in the early 1880s. In 1883 he was put forward as a Republican candidate for the Maryland House of Delegates but was passed over for the nomination on account of his race. In 1883, he was vice president of the Hyattsville Maryland Republican Club along with Robert S. Whitticomb and Ferdinand Hall under president F. H. Smith.

== Army ==
In 1884, President Chester A. Arthur appointed Plummer chaplain of the 9th Cavalry Regiment. His appointment was in large part due to the advocacy by Hart B. Holton. He replaced Chaplain Pierce and was the only black officer in the Army, holding the rank of captain. By 1890, 3 more black officers were also in the army, Charles Young and John H. Alexander, both also of the 9th Cavalry, and Allen Allensworth of the 24th Infantry, all serving in black regiments.

From August 1, 1885 to March 10, 1891, he was stationed at Fort McKinney in Wyoming. He also served for a time at Fort Riley in Kansas. Plummer was a very active chaplain, drawing hundreds to his services. He also conducted a well attended Sunday School. In 1892 and 1893 he inaugurated temperance meetings and founded a Temperance society.

His work was not without controversy. While stationed at Fort Robinson in Nebraska, he started a newspaper where, under a pseudonym, he advocated that the forts black soldiers defend themselves physically against abuse they received in nearby Crawford, Nebraska. In August 1894, Plummer proposed a scheme to the Secretary of War, Daniel S. Lamont, to explore parts of Africa. He designed this proposal with the support of Bishop Henry Turner and numerous other proponents of African Americans moving to Africa. However, his career in the army was cut short and ended in September.

On August 23, 1894, Plummer was court martialed for drinking and furnishing liquor and behaving inappropriately. This was in spite of Plummer's support of temperance and organizing an unpopular temperance group seeking to ban the sale of alcohol in Fort Robinson. The case relied heavily on the testimony of Sgt Robert Benjamin, also black, who had a grudge against Plummer because Plummer had reprimanded Benjamin for having an after-hours party. Benjamin's testimony was not corroborated by other witnesses and Plummer pled not guilty, but on September 7, after an 11-day trial, he was found guilty and appeals by Plummer and his wife were unsuccessful. Benjamin was promoted at about the same time. As chaplain of the 9th, Plummer was replaced by George W. Prioleau.

== Post-Army life and death ==
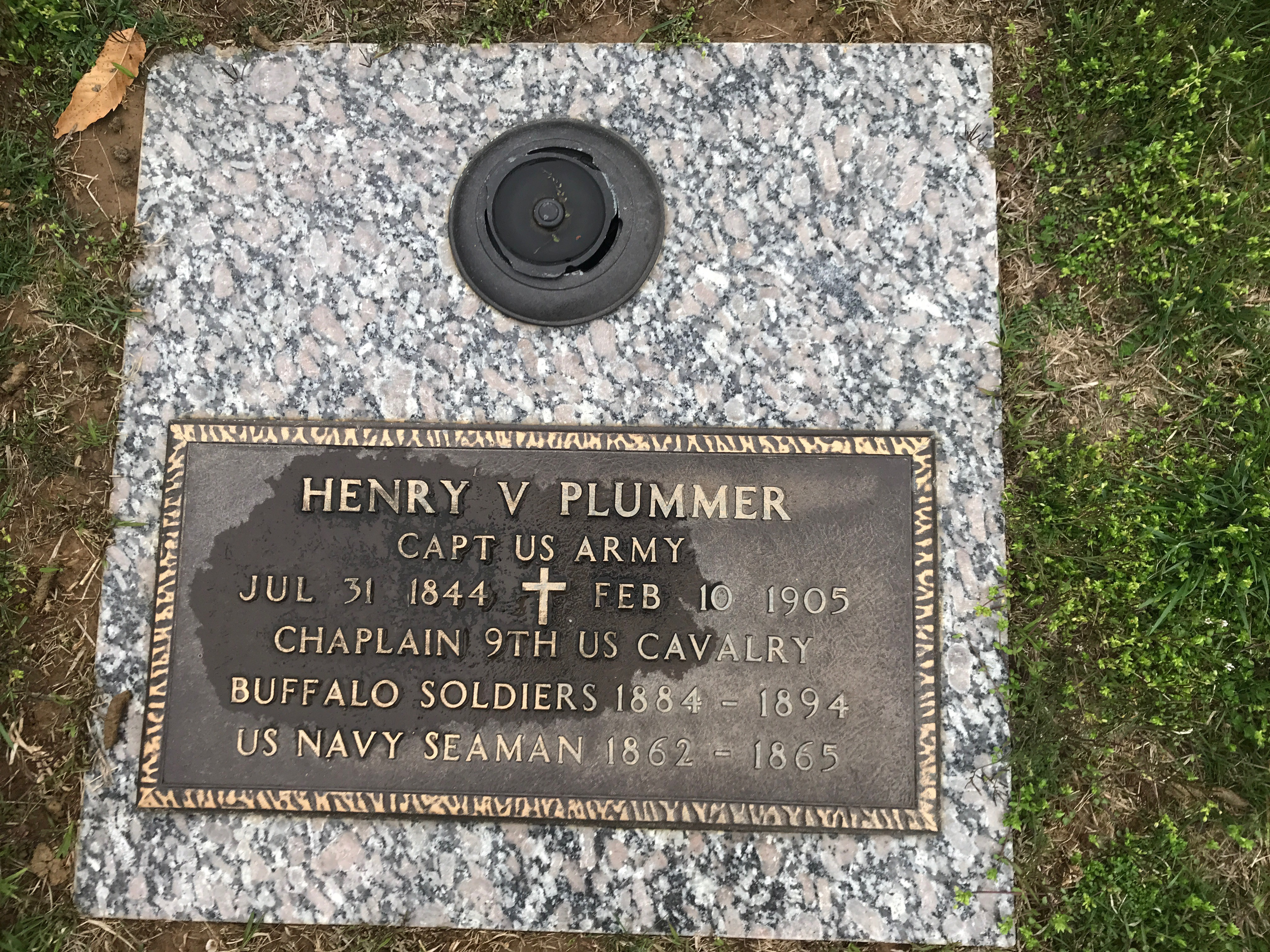
Grave of Captain Plummer in the National Harmony Memorial Park Cemetery, Prince George's County, Maryland

Plummer returned to Washington DC, where he took part in Baptist leadership, being a leader of the Baptist Minister's Union in 1899. He soon moved to Kansas City, Kansas, where he continued to be a religious leader and active in the local Republican Party.

Plummer died February 10, 1905. In 1924, his sister Nellie wrote a book which included a chapter about Plummer.

== Legacy ==
Multiple efforts were made to clear Plummer's name in Army records. In 1978, Army chaplain Earl V. Stover wrote a book about army chaplains and an article about Plummer which claimed that Plummer was the victim of racial prejudice and requested his discharge be upgraded. In 2002, Plummer's great-nephew L. Jerome Fowler organized a Committee to Clear Chaplain Plummer to work to clear Plummer's record with the Army. In 2003, after appeal from the group, Prince George's County Council passed a resolution calling on the president, Congress, the defense secretary, and the Army to review Plummer's case. In 2004, Maryland governor Robert Ehrlich signed an official document overturning the court-martial of Henry Plummer.

In February 2005, the Army changed Plummer's discharge to honorable, although it declined to remove Plummer's court martial and conviction from his record.

== Bibliography ==
- Plummer, Nellie Arnold. Out of the Depths, or the Triumph of the Cross. New York: G. K. Hall & Co. 1924
- Schubert, Frank N. Outpost of the Sioux Wars: A History of Fort Robinson. U of Nebraska Press, 1993.
