= Willis McGlascoe Carter =

American educator, editor, and civil rights activist (1852–1902)

- Born: September 3, 1852; Albemarle County, Virginia, U.S.
- Died: March 23, 1902 (aged 49); Staunton, Virginia, U.S.
- Resting place: Fairview Cemetery, Staunton, Virginia
- Education: Wayland Seminary
- Occupations: Educator, newspaper editor, civil rights activist
- Known for: Editing the Staunton Tribune; civil rights activism; advocacy against the Virginia Constitutional Convention of 1901–1902
- Political party: Republican
- Spouse: Serena B. Johnson (m. 1888; death 1898)
- Children: 2

Willis McGlascoe Carter (September 3, 1852 – March 23, 1902) was an African-American educator, newspaper editor, and civil rights activist in Virginia. Born into slavery in Albemarle County, he became principal of the West End School in Staunton, edited the African American weekly newspaper the Staunton Tribune, and was a leading figure in Black Republican politics in western Virginia during the late nineteenth century. He helped organize opposition to the Virginia Constitutional Convention of 1901–02, which disenfranchised most African American voters in the state. By the end of his life he was described by the Washington Bee as "one of the best known citizens of Virginia."
