= John Wesley Terry =

American preacher (1846–??)

- Born: 1846; Maury County, Tennessee, U.S.
- Died: Unknown
- Occupation: Minister
- Political party: United Labor Party

Religious life
- Religion: Baptist

John Wesley Terry (1846–?) was a Baptist preacher and labor leader in central Tennessee and Chicago. In Chicago, he became foreman of a shop in the West Division Street Car Company and became an officer of the Knights of Labor, taking part in the negotiations to end the strikes in 1886 - the Haymarket riots were a part of the same series of strikes.

== Early life ==
John Wesley Terry was born in Maury County, Tennessee in 1846 to slaves Hayward Terry and Mary. The family were owned by a man named William Pickard. Terry and his brother, Henry, were raised in very poor conditions until they were old enough to work in the fields. In 1863, his mother attempted to escape with Terry and his brother. This was during the US Civil War (1861-1865), and the Union Army controlled Columbia, Tennessee, where the family sought safety. Upon arrival, Henry enlisted in the army, but John was too young and remained with his mother in Columbia until the Union commander of the area turned them over to their master when Pickard came for them. Soon after, his mother fled again, escaping for good. When that commander, Colonel Myers, was superseded in command by the advance of a larger Union force which took full control of the county, John demanded his freedom and began to receive wages for his work. Terry then moved to a farm near Sandy Hook, Tennessee to work with his father. In 1866, he went to Nashville to live with his mother and work on steamboats. In 1868, he became foreman of a fruit farm for a year. In 1869, he returned to Nashville and opened a textile store. He also worked for P. J. Sexton in contracting and building. In 1872, he moved to Chicago.

In Chicago, he was baptized into the Baptist Religion by Rev. Richard DeBaptiste. March 11, 1873 he married Catherine Brown of Nashville at Olivet Baptist Church in Chicago. In 1875, he began working for the Chicago West Division Street Car company. He remained there until 1877 when he entered the Wayland Seminary in Washington DC. He received his diploma in 1881 and returned to Chicago where he was ordained and again took work with the West Division Street Car Company. He was promoted to foreman of the ironing and fitting department in 1882, the only black person to achieve this position and one of the few blacks working for the company, having seven to twelve white workers under his supervision.

== Labor leader ==
In 1886, Terry joined the Knights of Labor and was chosen by those working with him to represent them to settle the strikes in Chicago that year. On March 29, 1886 he was elected judge-advocate of the Charter Oak Assembly of the Knights. At this time he was the only black man in the organization. That same year, 1886, he was elected director of the Central Park Building and Loan Association. In December he was a delegate to the Cook County Political Assembly of the United Labor Party. He also helped form the Chicago Cooperative Packing and Provision Company and in its first meeting on January 2, 1887, he was elected director. At the first assembly of the Cook County United Labor Party he was chosen to be a member of the executive committee and on February 28, 1887 was a delegate to the city convention of the party where he was nominated to be city alderman for the thirteenth ward. Black workers played a major role in Chicago's ULP at this time, with William Bruce and James S. Nelson also receiving nominations for city positions at this time.
