= First Baptist Church (Petersburg, Virginia) =

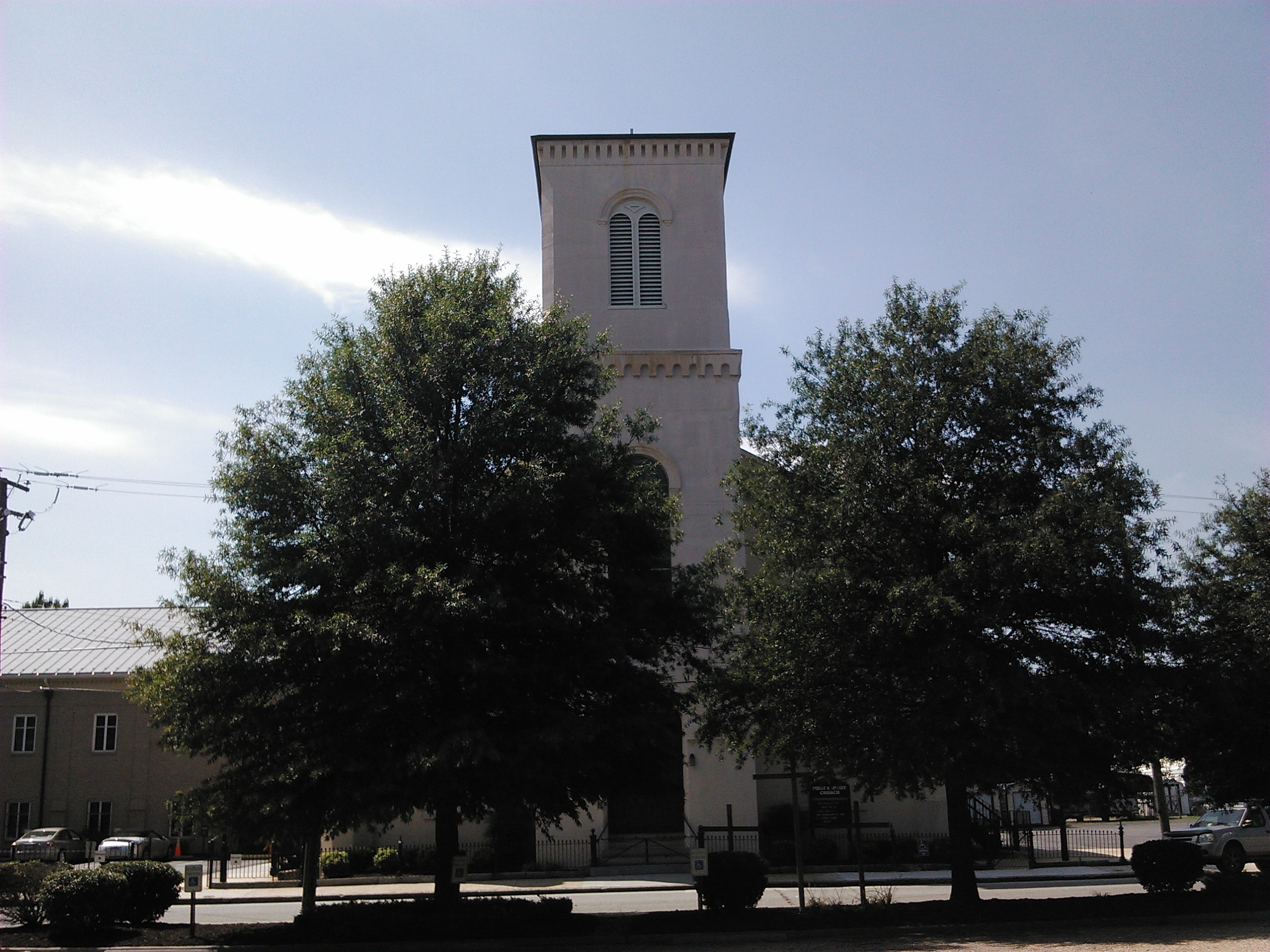
- First Baptist Church
- 37°13′24″N 77°24′14″W
- Location: 236 Harrison Street, Petersburg, Virginia
- Country: United States
- Denomination: Baptist
- Website: thefirstbaptistchurchpetersburg.org

History
- Founded: 1774

First Baptist Church (est. 1774) was the first Baptist church in Petersburg, Virginia; one of the first African-American Baptist congregations in the United States, and one of the oldest black churches in the nation. It established one of the first local schools for black children in the nation.

Its congregation was active during the 20th century Civil Rights Movement. Today it has the largest community outreach program in the city.

== History ==
In the earliest decades of the Baptist Church in the American Southeast, it was stimulated by preachers from New England who generated the Great Awakening. As more churches were started, members came together in an association. With growth through the end of the American Revolutionary War, in 1781 the association of churches split into two parts: along state lines for Virginia and North Carolina. The twenty-one congregations in Virginia formed the Portsmouth Baptist Association, named after their first meeting place. Representatives worked together to form church policy. From 1810 to 1828 they began to work on Foreign Missions and Christian Education. Later they established Sabbath Schools.

The history of First Baptist Church started with scattered black members in Prince George County, Virginia worshipping as New Lights in 1756 after the Great Awakening. Baptist preachers had traveled widely in the South where they appealed to both blacks and whites in evangelical outreach. In the early years, such preachers strongly supported an anti-slavery message, based on the equality of men made in God's image. Their democratic message and willingness to welcome blacks in active roles attracted many new members to the Baptists, including slaves. At a time when the Anglican Church was the established church in the colony, in some areas energetic young white men without many other opportunities were the ones to take up leadership roles as Baptist preachers, and they challenged the class system of the colony.

In 1774 some of the black New Light members united under the Rev. John Michaels. Calling themselves the First African Baptist Church, they met in Lunenburg in a building on the plantation of Colonel William Byrd III. After their meetinghouse at the Byrd plantation burned in a fire, in 1820 free members of the congregation moved to Petersburg, Virginia, where there was a growing free black community. (From about 300 free blacks in 1790, this community in Petersburg grew tenfold to 3,224 by 1860, when it was the largest free black population in the South. On the eve of the Civil War, city residents also included about 6,000 enslaved African Americans and 9,000 whites.)

With the move into Petersburg, the congregation took the name of First Baptist Church. They built their first church on Harrison Avenue (near the location of the current church.) This was one of two early black Baptist churches in the colonies before the American Revolutionary War; this was the first Baptist church to be established in Petersburg.

Emphasizing education, the First Baptist congregation also created one of the earliest local schools for black children in the nation. From its beginning, the congregation was led by black pastors. In the wake of Nat Turner's Rebellion in 1831, however, planters became so alarmed about the potential for religious messages to cause other revolts that they passed legislation in 1832 requiring that all black churches be led by white pastors. The planters believed they could ensure control of the message that whites would deliver. During this time, Thomas G. Keen was one of the ministers at First Baptist. After the Civil War, blacks took back control of their church and left the Southern Baptist Convention.

In 1851 they had 1,635 members making them the largest congregation in the Portsmouth Baptist Association of Virginia. By 1865 First Baptist had 1700 members. Rev. Leonard A. Black was pastor from 1873 to 1883, during which time the congregation grew to 3,600 members. At about age 17, he had escaped from slavery in Maryland in 1837, joining three brothers in Boston, Massachusetts and settling that year in Portland, Maine. He later married and lived for years in Providence, Rhode Island. In 1847 he had published a memoir of his trials and journey, The Life and Sufferings of Leonard Black, a Fugitive from Slavery, classified as a slave narrative.

First Baptist soon joined a state convention of black Baptist churches, aided by the Consolidated American Baptist Convention, to escape the supervision of whites. Such black state conventions eventually founded the National Baptist Convention, USA. The First Baptist congregation continued to grow after the war as numerous freedmen moved to Petersburg from outlying areas. Its members helped the rural migrants adjust to urban life.

The current church at 236 Harrison Avenue was built starting in 1870, after a fire burned the previous one. The congregation steadily added to the church, completing the steeple during Rev. Black's pastorate. In the late 1880s the pastor, Rev. Charles B. W. Gordon Sr., also edited The Pilot (later known as The National Pilot), a paper that was said to be a mouthpiece for Baptists in Virginia.

== 20th century ==
Like other major black churches, First Baptist long played a role in training new leaders in education, politics and business. Its congregation was active in the Civil Rights Movement, and the church was a place of mass meetings for demonstrations, support and voter registration.

In 1980 First Baptist built a new education building, and it has purchased nearby lots as part of planning for its future. It is an active leader in the downtown association of churches, with the largest community outreach program in the city. Its ministries include education and scholarship programs, welfare and family counseling. In addition, it televises services twice a week.

== See also ==
List of African American firsts
