= Shiloh Church (Newport, Rhode Island) =

Historic building

- Shiloh Baptist Church
- U.S. National Register of Historic Places
- U.S. National Historic Landmark District – Contributing property
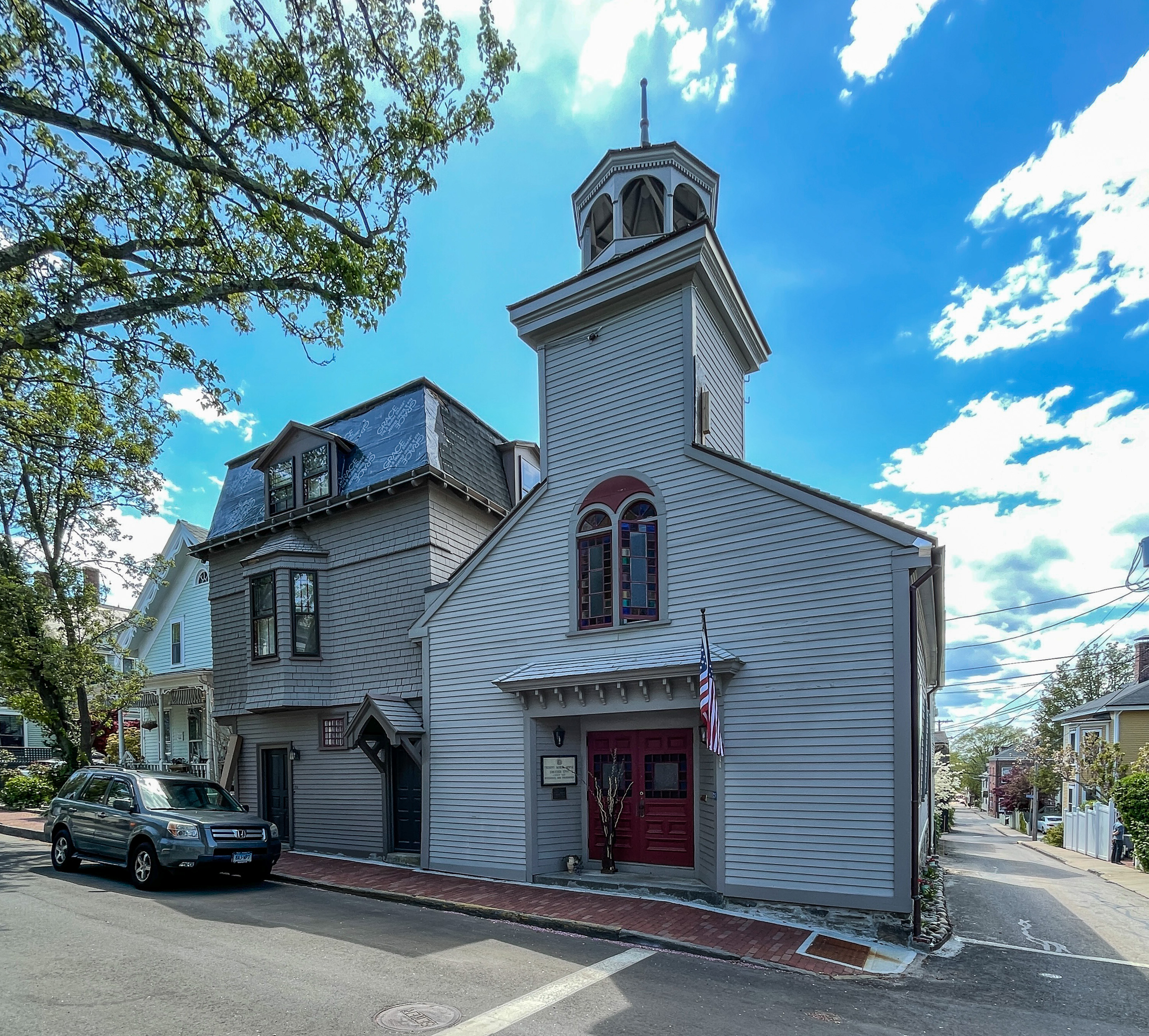
- Annex (left) and church (right)

- Location within Rhode Island Location within the United States
- Location: 25-29 School Street, Newport, Rhode Island
- Coordinates: 41°29′19″N 71°18′44″W
- Built: 1799
- Architectural style: Georgian
- Part of: Newport Historic District (ID68000001)
- NRHP reference No.: 71000026

Significant dates
- Added to NRHP: August 12, 1971
- Designated NHLDCP: November 24, 1968

Shiloh Baptist Church (also known as Trinity School House) is a historic former school building and former African American Baptist church in Newport, Rhode Island, United States.

== History ==
=== School house ===
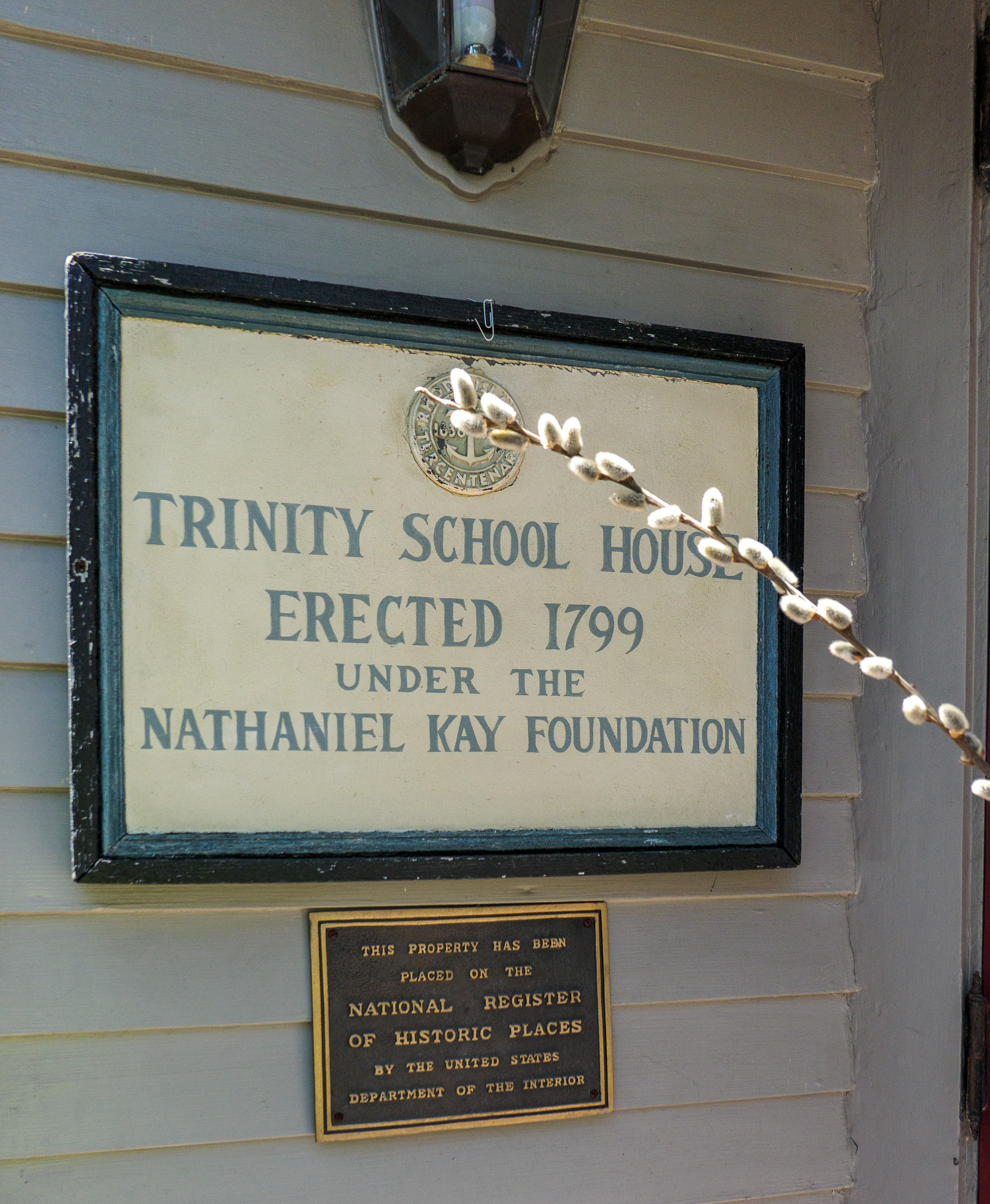
Plaque

In February 1799, the wardens and vestry of Trinity Church voted to build a school house. The funds were provided by a bequest by Nathaniel Kay. The resulting rectangular Georgian structure was 40 feet long and 25 feet wide. It was said that "many of the leading citizens of Newport attended school in this house." The school continued operation until 1867 when the building was purchased by the Shiloh Baptist congregation.

=== Shiloh Baptist Church ===
The Shiloh Church was an African American Baptist congregation founded on May 10, 1864, by Edmund Kelly in a house at 73 Levin Street owned by Esther Brinley. William James Barnett was installed as the first pastor, followed shortly by Theodore Valentine. The congregation met for five years in the Seventh Day Baptist Church, on Barney Street near Spring Street, but desired their own permanent location.

In 1868 the members of Shiloh Church purchased the school building on the corner of School and Mary streets from the Trinity Church corporation, at a cost of $2,000." The congregation moved into their new home on February 24, 1869, to a dedicatory sermon preached by Rev. Samuel Adlam. The cost of the church was raised from members over the next fourteen months.

=== Pastor Henry N. Jeter ===
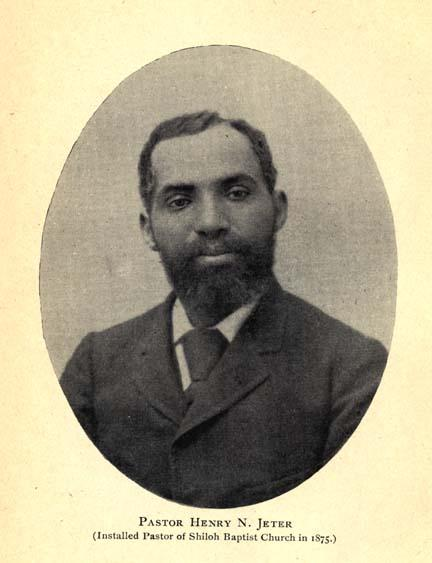
Pastor Henry N. Jeter (1851-1938)

Henry N. Jeter served as pastor of the Shiloh Baptist Church for 25 years, starting in 1875. Jeter established a written constitution and expanded the choir. He was known for "diligently uniting the people despite obstacles."

The building was renovated in 1873, at a cost of $1,600. An annex was built on the south side of the church in 1884, to house the parish hall. In 1897 the church remodeled the entrance and replaced the glass in the arched windows with stained glass.

=== Twentieth Century ===
The building was added to the National Register of Historic Places in 1971, at which time it was still owned by the Shiloh Baptist Society. By 2020, it was operating as a bed and breakfast.

== See also ==
- National Register of Historic Places listings in Newport County, Rhode Island
