= Lyman T. Johnson =

American teacher and desegregation pioneer

Lyman Johnson
- Born: Lyman Beecher Tefft Johnson; June 12, 1906; Columbia, Tennessee, USA
- Died: October 3, 1997 (aged 91); Louisville, Kentucky
- Education: Virginia Union University (1930), University of Michigan (1931)
- Occupations: Kentucky educator, school administrator, and desegregation pioneer
- Known for: Challenging Kentucky's Day Law
- Awards: Doctor of Letters (University of Kentucky, 1979)

Lyman Tefft Johnson (June 12, 1906 – October 3, 1997) was an American educator and influential role model for racial desegregation in Kentucky. He is best known as the plaintiff whose successful legal challenge opened the University of Kentucky to African-American students in 1949.

== Early life and education ==
Born in Columbia, Tennessee in 1906, Johnson was the eighth of nine children. His grandparents had been enslaved. His father was educated in part by Edmund Kelly and Lyman Beecher Tefft, for whom Johnson was named. His father was a graduate of Roger Williams University in Nashville and principal College Hill School in Columbia.

In 1926, he received his high school diploma from the preparatory division of Knoxville College. After earning his bachelor's degree in Greek from Virginia Union University in 1930, he went on to receive a master's degree in history from the University of Michigan in 1931. Johnson was a member of Alpha Phi Alpha fraternity.

== Military service ==
Johnson served in the United States Navy during World War II; he commented on the high point of his Naval career:

Toward the end of the war, long about the middle of '44, or maybe the beginning of '44, they made twelve ensigns, and they announced then to all the rest of us that, "We're making twelve ensigns. We won't make any more, and they won't be promoted." In other words, don't aspire for anything. So what they did in my group, they had 47 of us so-called educated Negroes stationed up there at Great Lakes. They didn't know what to do with us. I remember Commander Caufield who ran Great Lakes. He was the commander of the center. He told me, 'Well, my God, sailor,' that's what he called me, 'You fellows, some of you got more education than these officers that are appointed to serve over you. We don't know what to do with you. We don't have the nerve to be trying to tell you, when you outrank us in education. So you find something to do on your own.' I think there were about twenty of us who decided that the best service we could render would be to run a school for illiterates, and many a time, 5,000 black sailors would be dumped on Great Lakes from down in Mississippi, Alabama, and Georgia, right out of the cotton field, hadn't been to school one day in their lives. We'd take them in little batches for seven weeks. We said, 'Give them to us for seven weeks, and we'll have them passing what the public school called third grade tests.' We must have had something on the ball ... that was the biggest contribution that I rendered. ...

== Career ==
Johnson taught history, economics, and mathematics for 16 years at Louisville's Central High School before engaging the University of Kentucky in a legal test case intended to permit him to pursue further graduate study there.

Johnson filed a federal lawsuit against the University of Kentucky in 1948, challenging the state's Day Law, the state law that prohibited blacks and whites from attending the same schools.

His challenge was successful, which allowed him to enter UK in 1949 as a 43-year-old graduate student. in a documentary, Great Leaders:the Odyssey of Lyman Johnson, he says that crosses were burnt on the campus the first few days that he attended. Although he left UK before earning a degree, he received an honorary Doctor of Letters degree in 1979.

Johnson continued teaching at Central until 1966, before spending another five years in the Jefferson County Public Schools as an assistant principal at two junior high schools (one of the schools was Parkland Jr. High). After retirement from the public school system, he then spent three years in a similar administrative capacity at a Catholic high school.

He was also a member of the Jefferson County Board of Education from 1978 to 1982.

Johnson was an eloquent speaker. Once while defending underprivileged youth in public schools, Johnson quoted from memory lines from "Thomas Gray's "Elegy Written in a Country Churchyard." He said that these forgotten students were like desert flowers:"Full many a flower has been born to bloom and blush unseen and waste the sweetness of its fragrance on the desert air."

In addition to opening the door for thousands of minority students, he also led struggles to integrate neighborhoods, swimming pools, schools, and restaurants. He also headed the Louisville chapter of the National Association for the Advancement of Colored People for six years.

Johnson died in Louisville, Kentucky in 1997 at the age of 91.

== Legacy ==
The University of Kentucky Graduate School currently oversees a competitive fellowship program in his honor, for students who meet the academic requirements and who directly contribute to the University of Kentucky's compelling interest in diversity. There is also a postdoctoral fellowship program named in his honor. Recipients are known as Lyman T. Johnson Postdoctoral Fellows.

In 2015 in his honor the University of Kentucky renamed a dormitory to Lyman T. Johnson Hall.

Within the University of Kentucky Alumni Association the African American constituent group is named the Lyman T. Johnson African American Alumni.

Lyman T. Johnson Middle School—commonly known as Johnson Traditional Middle School—was named in his honor in 1980. Wade Hall, professor emeritus and former Chair of the English Department of Bellarmine University, wrote a biography of Johnson titled The Rest of the Dream: The Black Odyssey of Lyman Johnson. University of Kentucky Press. 1988. ISBN 0-8131-1674-0.
