= Nathaniel Colver =

Baptist minister in the United States

- Born: 10 May 1794; Orwell
- Died: 25 December 1870 (aged 76); Chicago

Nathaniel Colver (born in Orwell, Vermont, 10 May 1794; died in Chicago, 25 December 1870) was an American Baptist clergyman.

== Biography ==
Colver's father, a Baptist minister, moved, while Nathaniel was a child, to Champlain, in northern New York, and thence to West Stockbridge, Massachusetts, where the son was converted and decided to enter the Baptist ministry. Though he had but slender opportunities of early education, he made himself a respectable scholar.

After brief pastorates in various places, Colver was called in 1839 to Boston, where he cooperated in organizing the church later known as Tremont Temple. His ministry there was remarkable for its bold, uncompromising, and effective warfare upon slavery and intemperance, as well as for its directly spiritual results. On leaving Boston in 1852, Colver was pastor at South Abington, Massachusetts, at Detroit, at Cincinnati, and finally, in 1861, at Chicago. While in Cincinnati, he received from Denison University the degree of D.D. In Chicago he held the inaugural professorship of doctrinal theology in the theological seminary which later became the Divinity School of the University of Chicago.

From 1867 to 1870, Colver was president of the Freedman's Institute in Richmond, Virginia. Colver played a conspicuous role in the anti-masonic, anti-slavery, and temperance movements of his day. In 1867, Colver headed the Richmond Campus of the National Theological Institute of Washington D.C., created by the American Baptist Home Mission Society. He died shortly thereafter and the school was renamed the Colver Institute in his honor. It eventually became part of Virginia Union University in 1899.

== Works ==
Colver published, besides occasional addresses, three lectures on Odd-fellowship (1844).
