= Emily Saunders Plummer =

- Born: Emily Saunders c. 1815; Lanham, Maryland
- Died: January 17, 1876 (aged 60–61); Riversdale, Maryland
- Spouse: Adam Francis Plummer (m. 1841)
- Children: 9, including Henry V. Plummer

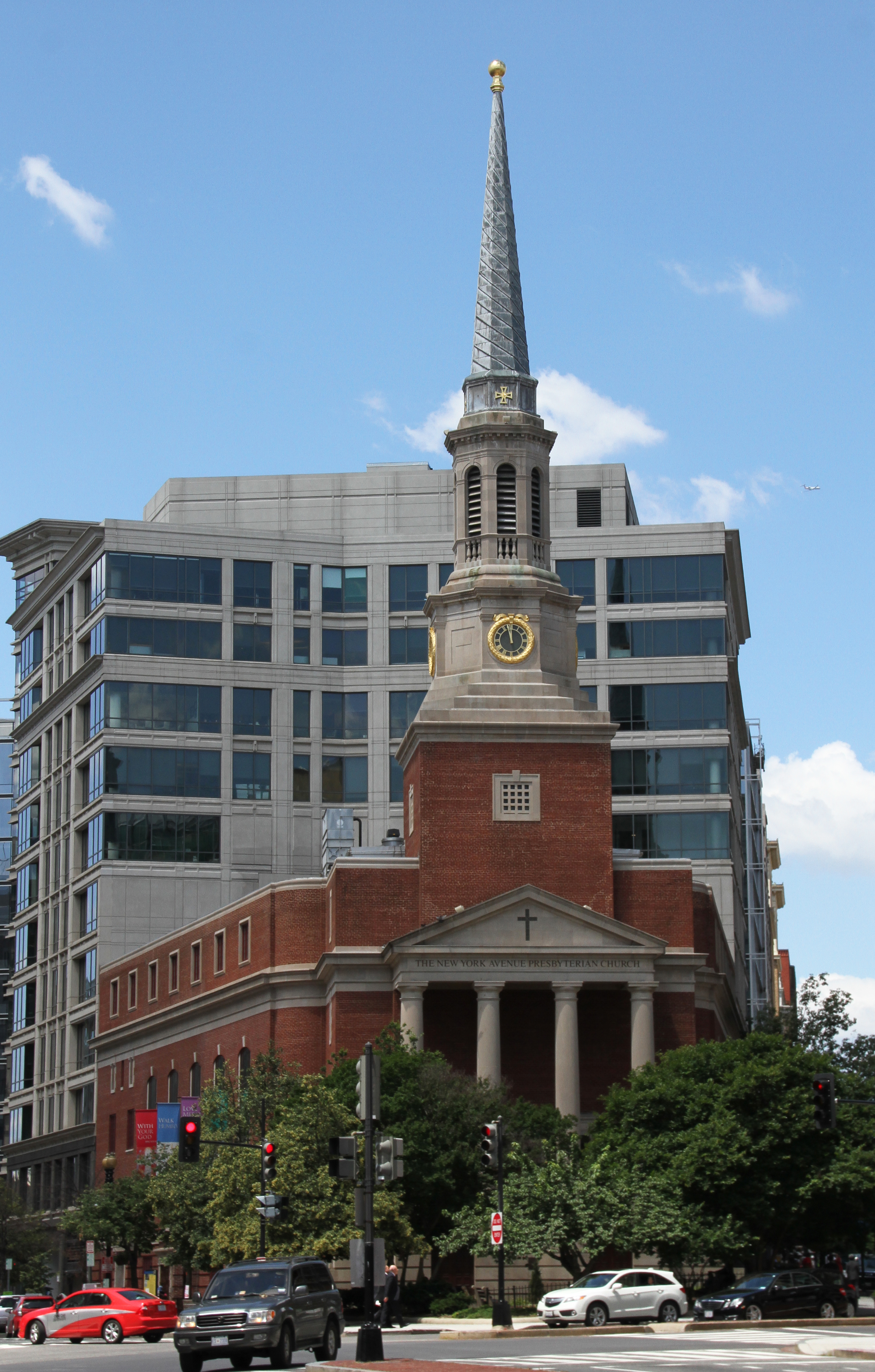
The New York Avenue Presbyterian Church, the site of Emily and Adam's marriage, in the present day.

Emily Saunders Plummer (c. 1815 – January 17, 1876) was an American slave from Prince George's County, Maryland. She married a slave from another plantation, Adam Francis Plummer, on May 30, 1841. The two of them had nine children and spent much of their marriage attempting to prevent the family being separated through sale. After failing to do so previously, Emily managed to escape from her master, taking five of her children with her, in October, 1863. After spending time in a Baltimore jail, Emily and her children were able to reunite with the rest of the family in Riverdale. She ultimately contracted pneumonia and died on January 17, 1876.

== Early life ==
Emily was born on the Three Sisters Plantation located in Lanham, Maryland. Her precise date of birth is uncertain, but it was likely sometime around the year 1815. Emily never knew her father, Richard Saunders, as he was sold in Annapolis while she was very young. Her mother, Nellie Orne Saunders, was of mixed ancestry; her mother was English and her father an African slave. Altogether, Nellie had 23 children, including Emily, some of whom were from another marriage.

== Marriage ==
In 1839, Emily and her mother visited the Riverdale plantation to tend to her Aunt Lucy, who was suffering from illness. While there, Emily met Adam Francis Plummer, a Riverdale slave, and the two fell in love. The couple were married at the New York Avenue Presbyterian Church in Washington DC on May 30, 1841; The marriage was legally recognized and a license was issued in spite of the fact that marriages between slaves were usually not legally binding at the time. Throughout the years, Adam and Emily would have nine children, but only eight lived to adulthood.

== Life as a Slave ==
During the first twenty-two years of their marriage, Adam and Emily were unable to see each other on a daily basis as they lived on different plantations. While Emily lived at Three Sisters, Adam would make the eight mile journey to visit her on weekends. However Adam was granted provision grounds in to cultivate crops in his free time, which could be sold at market in order to purchase provisions and gifts with which he refurbished and decorated Emily's cabin. The couple's lives changed eight years after their marriage when Emily's enslaver, Sarah Ogle Hilleary, died, and her new owner, Tilman Hilleary, tried to sell her. His first attempted in March 1849 fell through due to the birth of Emily's fourth child, Julia and Emily's sister, Henny, was sold instead. Adam then sought a buyer for his wife and children, and ultimately settled on Colonel Livingston Gilbert Thompson from Meridian Hill, Washington D.C. The sale was completed on December 2, 1852, with Emily and three of her children being transferred to Colonel Thompson while two of them were forced to stay behind at the Three Sisters Plantation. Although it is believed the distance between Riverdale and Meridian Hill was similar to that between Riverdale and Three Sisters, Colonel Thompson's wife was less willing to allow Adam to visit his wife than Mrs. Hilleary had been so he began seeing his family on a biweekly, rather than a weekly, basis. Living conditions at the Thompson residence were worse for Emily than they had been at Three Sisters; In June 1854, Emily's sixth child, Marjory Ellen Rose Plummer, died due to neglect within a year of her birth. Colonel Thompson beat and swore at her children, and Emily would put herself in harm's way in order to protect them from his outbursts. In response Thompson threatened her with violence and considered selling her. In 1855, the Thompsons relocated to Mt. Hebron in Howard County, Maryland. The move meant the distance between Adam and Emily grew from around eight miles to twenty-six, and he could only visit his wife and children twice a year, on Christmas and Easter. Emily's problems grew further when her oldest daughter, Sarah Miranda Plummer, was caught attempting to escape from the Three Sisters plantation and was sold to an owner in New Orleans. During this period Adam's ability to read and write was critical in keeping the family together. He was able to send letters to Emily by using a friend as a messenger, and Emily in turn relied upon her masters to both read and deliver letters on her behalf.

== Escape Attempts and Freedom ==
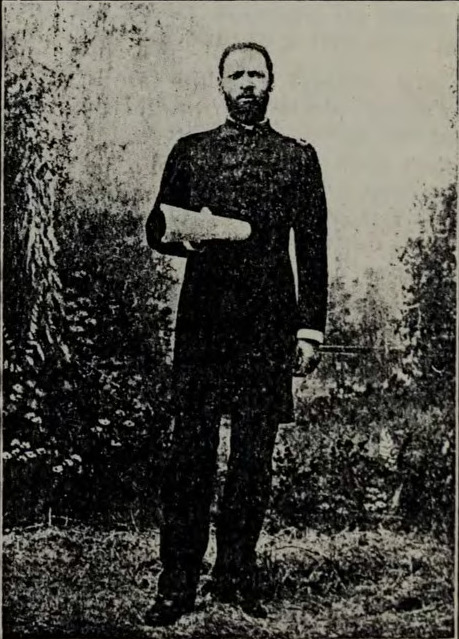
Emily's oldest son, Henry.

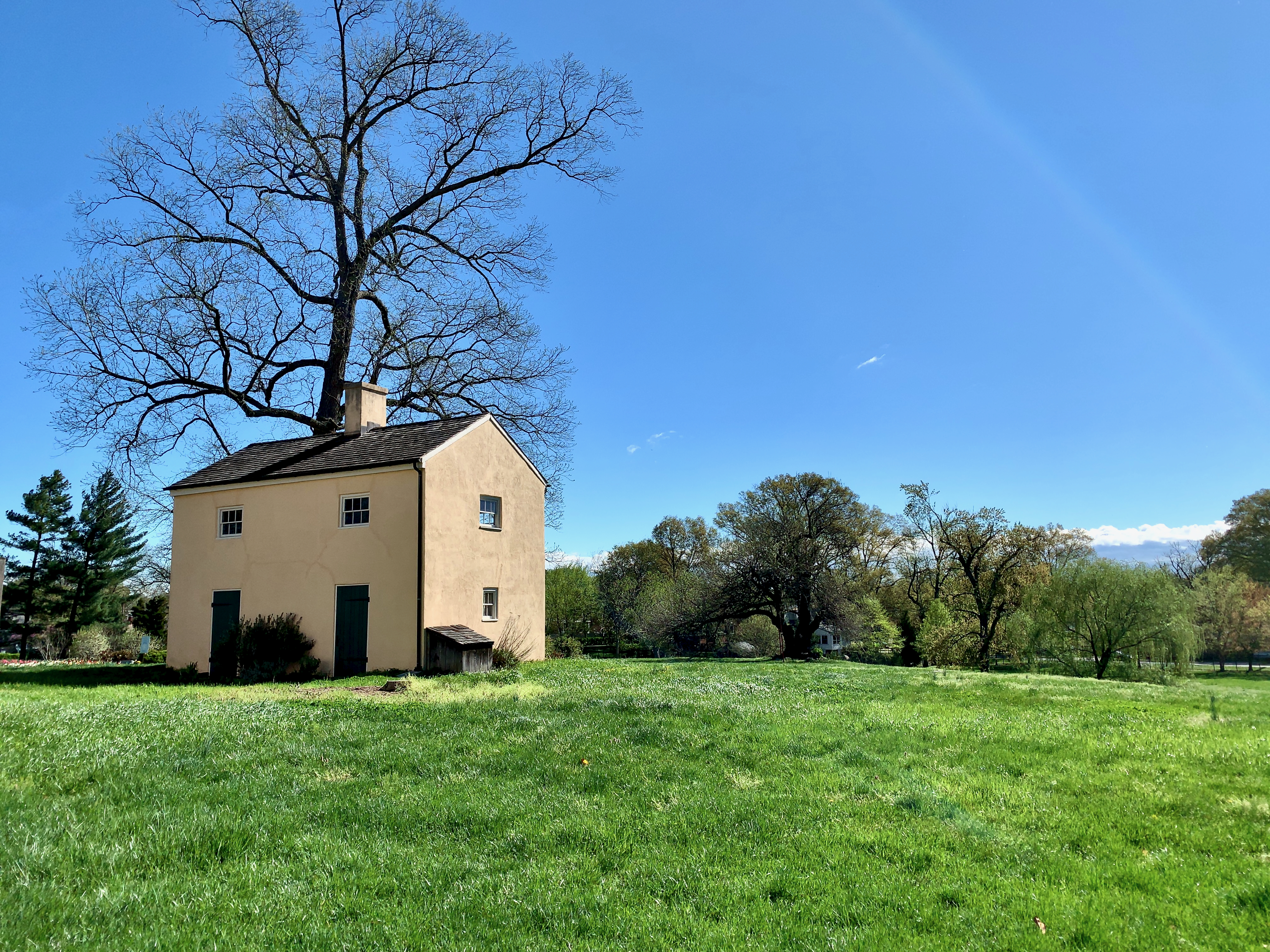
The last outbuilding of the Riverdale Plantation was restored and is now a museum for the Plummer Family.

Emily and Adam had received their marriage license in 1841. Because it was not a common practice to allow slaves to legally marry, the Northern United States and Canada generally recognized marriage licenses as proof of freedom. The Plummers knew this, and in 1845 they planned to escape with their children to a free state but were foiled when Emily's aunt provided details of the plot and handed over the marriage license to Mrs. Hilleary. In response, Mrs. Hilleary had Emily, who normally worked as a cook, work in the fields as punishment.After Emily had been relocated to Mt. Hebron with the Thompsons she made her next attempt. On January 1, 1863, during the American Civil War, the Emancipation Proclamation took effect, legally rendering all slaves in the Confederate States of America as free. It did not, however, free slaves living in states which had remained loyal to the Union, including Maryland. This did not discourage Emily, who soon had her oldest son, Henry, flee the plantation on his own. Emily made the next step in October 1863, taking along the remaining five children under her care, and going to Baltimore, where they were caught and kept in jail for two months. Emily was able to befriend the warden by working for him as a cook, and Colonel Thompson failed to pay the fees necessary to retake possession of her and the children. This provided Adam the opportunity to take custody of them instead. With most of the family finally together, Adam and Emily tasked Henry with bringing Sarah back from New Orleans which he did in October 1866.

== Final Years and Death ==
In 1870, Adam purchased a ten-acre homestead near Riverdale, nicknamed "Mt. Rose", where he and Emily lived for the rest of their lives. Sarah meanwhile started the First Baptist Church of Bladensburg where, on New Year's Eve of 1875, Emily watched her son Henry give his first sermon. She began showing symptoms of pneumonia on January 9 and died on January 17, 1876.

== Family ==
Her daughter, Nellie Arnold Plummer, wrote the book Out of the Depths or The Triumph of the Cross, on it describes the story of her fathers since him was bought at age of 10, his marriage and the transition of her family from slavery to freedom, using as one of her sources the diary that his father started when he married her mother.
