= Harold Plummer =

English footballer

Personal information
- Full name: Harold George Plummer
- Place of birth: Bristol, England
- Height: 5 ft 11 in (1.80 m)
- Position: Full back

Senior career*
Years	Team	Apps	(Gls)
1929–1930	Burnley	0	(0)
1930–1933	Darlington	30	(0)
- * Club domestic league appearances and goals

Harold George Plummer was an English professional footballer who played as a full back.
