= Malcolm MacVicar =

American educator (1829–1904)

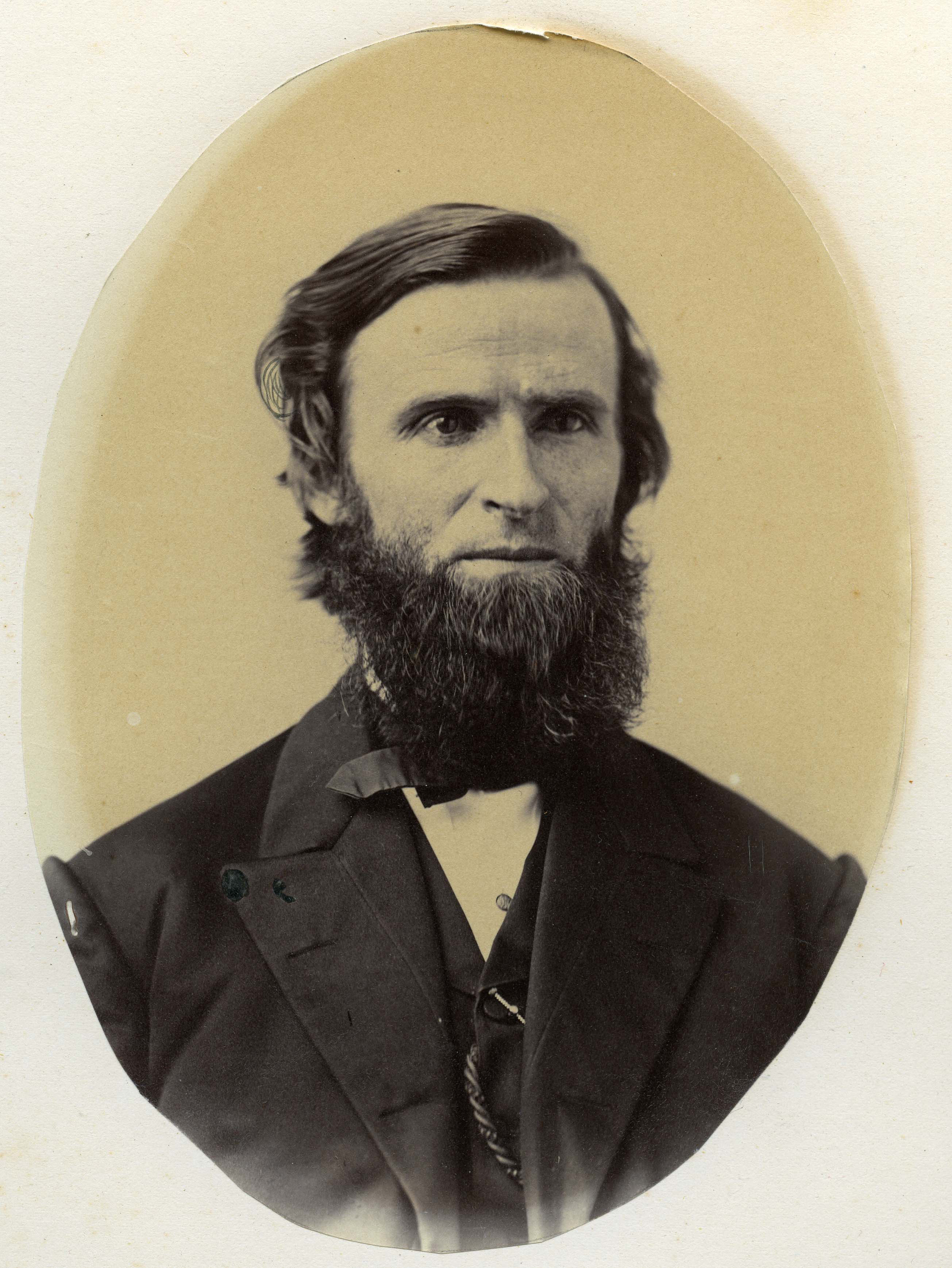
This is an 1866 photograph of Malcolm MacVicar, last principal of the Brockport (NY) Collegiate Institute at the time of the photograph.

Malcolm MacVicar (September 30, 1829 – May 18, 1904), later called Malcolm MacVicar Sr to distinguish him from his grandson of the same name, was a prominent American educator active during the latter half of the 19th century.

== Early years ==
Born in Dunglass, Argyllshire, Scotland, MacVicar's parents emigrated to Canada when he was young. He served for a time as a ship's carpenter in Cleveland, Ohio, before becoming a Baptist minister and eventually attending the University of Rochester, from which he graduated in 1859. After graduation he was hired as a teacher of math and natural science at Brockport Collegiate Institute, now The College at Brockport, State University of New York.

== University leader ==
[I]t is one thing to give young men and women such industrial training as will fit them to earn successfully a good livelihood; and yet quite another thing to imbue them with a missionary spirit, and fit them to be instructors and leaders of others. The latter . . . should be the chief, if not the only, work of the Home Mission Schools.

— Malcolm MacVicar

After teaching there for four years, MacVicar became the principal of Brockport Collegiate Institute (now The College at Brockport, State University of New York), remaining there from 1863 to 1867. During this time, he oversaw the school's transition from a private academy to that of a state school, the Brockport State Normal School, one of four normal schools in New York. MacVicar Hall is named for him.

In 1868, he left Brockport to become the superintendent of Leavenworth Public Schools in Leavenworth, Kansas, a position which he held for one year. He then returned to New York to be the principal of Potsdam State Normal School (now SUNY Potsdam) from 1869 to 1879. In 1880, he served as the principal of Michigan State Normal School (now Eastern Michigan University).

In 1881, he was appointed "professor of Apologetics and Biblical Interpretation" at Toronto Baptist College, and was a leader in the movement for the school to merge with Woodstock College, which it did in 1887. MacVicar then served as the first chancellor of the newly formed McMaster University, leading the school from 1888 until 1890.

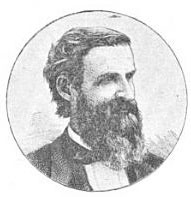

MacVicar left McMaster to become the superintendent of education for the American Baptist Home Mission Society, which founded a number of historically black colleges and universities. MacVicar said that "it is one thing to give young men and women such industrial training as will fit them to earn successfully a good livelihood; and yet quite another thing to imbue them with a missionary spirit, and fit them to be instructors and leaders of others. The latter . . . should be the chief, if not the only, work of the Home Mission Schools." Under MacVicar's leadership, the Society founded Virginia Union University in Richmond, Virginia, and from the school's founding in 1899 until his death in 1904, MacVicar was the first president. MacVicar Hall, a women's residence hall, is named for him.

MacVicar Hospital, at Spelman College, is also named for him, owing to his involvement with the American Baptist Home Mission Society.

== Inventor ==
MacVicar invented and sold a teaching tool, called the "MacVicar Tellurian Globe".

== Author ==
During the course of his career as an educator and an administrator, MacVicar found the time to write a number of books relating to education. These included A Complete Arithmetic (1876), An Elementary Arithmetic (1877), Hand-book of the MacVicar Tellurian Globe (1878), Teachers' Manual of Elementary Arithmetic (1880), and Principles of Education (1892). A Complete Arithmetic and Principles of Education remain in print as of 2011.

The Journal of Education reviewed Principles in 1893, saying, "[MacVicar] has endeavored—with, on the whole, considerable success—to state briefly, but clearly and suggestively, the leading propositions concerning the nature and processes of education, leading up, finally, to the training necessary for one who is to become a teacher. . . Altogether, we like this little book, and are glad to have it."
