= Henry Waite Plummer =

Planter and politician in Jamaica

Henry Waite Plummer (1771-1847) was a planter and slave-owner in Jamaica. He was elected to the House of Assembly of Jamaica in 1820.
