= Richmond Theological Institute =

- Richmond, Virginia; United States

Information
- Former names: Richmond Theological Institute, Colver Institute (1869–1876), Richmond Institute (1876–1886), Richmond Theological Seminary (1886–1899)
- Religious affiliation: American Baptist Home Mission Society
- Founded: 1867
- Founder: Nathaniel Colver
- Closed: 1899, merged
- Part of: National Theological Institute of Washington D.C.

Richmond Theological Institute (RTI) was a higher education institution active from 1867 until 1899 in Richmond, Virginia, serving African American and former slaves after the American Civil War. Formerly known as Richmond Theological Seminary, Richmond Institute, and Colver Institute.

== History ==
It had its beginnings in November 1865 when the American Baptist Home Mission Society (ABHMS) sponsored Joseph Getchell Binney (formerly of Columbian College in Washington, D.C., and later of Karen Theological Seminary in Rangoon, Burma) for a short-lived class in Richmond, Virginia for theological training of African-Americans. Around the same time, the National Theological Institute of Washington, D.C. was forming schools for ministerial training of freedmen in Washington and Augusta, Georgia.

They sponsored Nathaniel Colver to form a school in Richmond, Virginia, which commenced in Lumpkin's Jail, formerly a slave trading facility, in late 1867. Robert Ryland was hired as an instructor the first year. Both Dr. Colver and Dr. Ryland resigned after one year, and in 1868, Charles Henry Corey was transferred from the Augusta Institute (which was later to become Morehouse College) and commenced classes in October. At the recommendation of Dr. Ryland, a female instructor was hired at half the pay he had received. The school took the name Colver Institute in 1869.

In 1876 the school was incorporated as the Richmond Institute, only to be reincorporated as the Richmond Theological Seminary in 1886 after it became the central college for advanced theological training of Black Baptist ministers in the South.

In 1870, the National Theological Institute was absorbed by the ABHMS, which carried on its work in Augusta and Richmond, and merged operations in Washington into its Wayland Seminary. Charles Corey headed the RTS for 30 years. In 1899, Corey was instrumental in the merging of the Richmond Theological Seminary with the Wayland Seminary in order to form Virginia Union University.

In 1895, Charles Corey wrote a history of the school. The L. Douglas Wilder Library and Learning Resource Center holds the records of the Richmond Theological Seminary.

Notable alumni include Charles B. W. Gordon Sr.
