= H. Vinton Plummer =

American lawyer

Henry Vinton Plummer, Jr.
- Born: 1876; Hyattsville, Maryland, US
- Occupations: Lawyer, real estate agent, civil rights activist
- Father: Henry V. Plummer

Henry Vinton Plummer, Jr. (born 1876) was an American lawyer, real estate agent, civil rights activist, and black nationalist. In the 1920s, he became involved in Marcus Garvey's Universal Negro Improvement Association and African Communities League (UNIA), leading the organizations publicity and propaganda wings, Garvey's secret service, and its militia.

== Early life and family ==
Henry Vinton Plummer, Jr. was born in 1876 in Hyattsville, Maryland to Henry V. Plummer, a Baptist minister and future Army chaplain. Plummer's father was stationed at forts in the Western United States from 1884 to 1894, and Plummer attended schools in or near these forts. He attended high school in Wyoming, where he was valedictorian of his class, in which he was the lone black student, graduating in 1889. He enrolled at the University of Nebraska from 1897–1900 and afterwards was admitted to the bar in Omaha. Plummer's wife, Zora B. Rucker graduated from the Armour Institute in Chicago in about 1905 and worked as a lecturer in home economics, often traveling throughout the country.

== Career ==
Living in Omaha, Plummer became involved in law, real estate, and local politics. In 1907, Plummer worked with saloon-keeper Ole Jackson to oppose a bill in the state legislature which would restrict tipping as being unfair to service workers. In 1908, Plummer held the position of tax clerk in the county clerk's office and spoke out against removal of black officers in favor of white ones to lead black fire companies.

In September 1908, Plummer was an Omaha delegate to the convention of the National Republican League in Cincinnati, Ohio. That fall, he ran as a Republican candidate for the Nebraska Legislature. He was favored in the race but lost. In December 1908, Plummer supported the candidacy of fellow Omahan John Grant Pegg for president of the Interstate Literary Association in Kansas City.

In February 1910, Plummer was given ten dollars to either pay bail or otherwise help get a woman get out of jail. He did not succeed, and the person who gave Plummer the money would not accept its return, instead suing Plummer. The judge in that case, Police Judge Crawford, argued that Plummer was trying to cheat and swindle. Plummer claimed that there was a conspiracy to injure his reputation. In May, Plummer was given another ten dollars by another client seeking to help in a real estate deal. Plummer again was unsuccessful in securing the deal and the client would not take the money back, and again Plummer was sued. Judge Crawford was again in charge of the proceedings and Plummer was found guilty, barred from law, and fined $25 and jailed for several hours.

== Washington, D.C. ==
Later in 1910, he moved to Washington, D.C., where he established a real estate business. He became involved in progressive politics and he was the assistant sergeant at arms at the 1912 Progressive party national convention. He also continued legal work. In 1914, Plummer was an assistant for attorney John E. Collins in a trial before Judge Daniel Thew Wright. Later, Wright was at that time the subject of congressional investigation, and Plummer spoke before the committee against Wright.

In late 1915, Plummer was again in trouble with the law, and was sentenced to 30 days for using fake checks. In early 1916, he was indicted along with Thomas F. Karr on embezzlement charges.

== UNIA ==
He became involved in Marcus Garvey's Universal Negro Improvement Association and African Communities League (UNIA). Plummer was a founding member of the Newport News, Virginia UNIA and was first vice president of the branch from 1918–1920. He became the head of the Black Star Line bureau of Publicity and Propaganda and the chief of Marcus Garvey's secret service staff. He also was a leader in its African Legion. In 1920, he helped rewrite US Army drill regulations for use by the militia and led drills for the group. He moved to New York City in the early 1920s and in March 1921 was a member of the UNIA delegation that welcomed Liberian president Charles D. B. King. He also was a New York delegate to the 1920, 1922, and 1924 UNIA conventions.

Plummer continued to have legal and personal troubles, and served time in prison in the early 1920s. In March 1923, Plummer and Garvey's secretary, Amy Lamos, had a serious disagreement and Plummer threatened to leave the UNIA, but remained. At the August 1924 UNIA convention, Garvey stood by Plummer against charges that Plummer had been disloyal during his periods in prison.

== Bibliography ==
- Bair, Barbara, and Robert A. Hill. Marcus Garvey, Life and Lessons: A Centennial Companion to the Marcus Garvey and Universal Negro Improvement Association Papers. University of California Press, 1988. p419-420
- Harold, Claudrena N. The Rise and Fall of the Garvey Movement in the Urban South, 1918–1942. Routledge, 2014.
- Hill, Robert A., and Marcus Garvey. The Marcus Garvey and Universal Negro Improvement Association Papers, Vol. IX: Africa for the Africans June 1921 – December 1922. Vol. 9. Univ of California Press, 1995.
