= Wayland Seminary =

American school

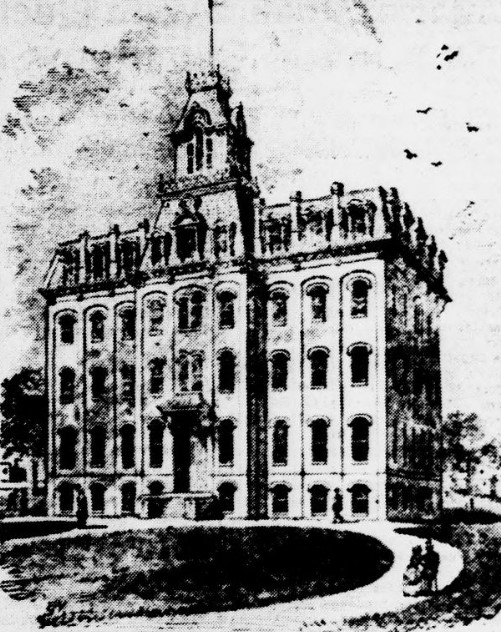
Wayland Seminary was located in present-day Meridian Hill Park in Washington, D.C.

Wayland Seminary was the Washington, D.C., school of the National Theological Institute. The institute was established beginning in 1865 by the American Baptist Home Mission Society (ABHMS). At first designed primarily for providing education and training for African-American freedmen to enter into the ministry, it expanded its offerings to meet the educational demands of the former enslaved population. Just before the end of the 19th century it was merged with its sister institution, the Richmond Theological Seminary, to form the current Virginia Union University in Richmond.

== 1865: Plans to educate the freedmen ==
By late 1865, the American Civil War was over and slavery in the United States ended with the adoption of the Thirteenth Amendment to the United States Constitution. However, known as "freedmen", millions of former African American slaves were without employable job skills, opportunities, and even literacy itself (e.g., in Virginia, since Nat Turner's Rebellion in 1831, it had been unlawful to teach a slave to read).

Some realized that these newly freed people were in need of educational opportunities. Members of the American Baptist Home Mission Society (ABHMS) proposed a "National Theological Institute" (NTI) which would educate those wishing to enter the Baptist ministry. Soon, the proposed mission was expanded to offer courses and programs at college, high school and even preparatory levels, to both men and women.

== 1867–1897: Washington, D.C. ==
Separate branches were set up in Washington, D.C., and Richmond, Virginia. (Another school, the Augusta Institute, now Morehouse College, also received the support of the NTI.) Classes began in both cities by 1867. In Washington, classes were held in the basement of the First Colored Baptist Church of Washington, D.C. (the church was later renamed the Nineteenth Street Baptist Church). The classes which eventually developed into a school became known as Wayland Seminary. The school was named in commemoration of Francis Wayland, former president of Brown University and a leader in the anti-slavery struggle. A new building for Wayland students opened in 1875. It was located in present-day Meridian Hill Park and demolished around 1900.

The first president was George Mellen Prentiss King, an abolitionist, who administered Wayland for 30 years (1867–1897). Over the 30 years King led Wayland, the other branch of the originally planned National Theological Institute at Richmond had faced even greater challenges than Wayland. There, the first classes were actually held in a former "slave jail" building.

George Rice Hovey served as president of the school from 1897 to 1899.

== 1899: Merger to form Virginia Union University ==
During the 1890s plans were pushed forward to merge several ABHMS institutions into one university, and by 1899 it was agreed that Wayland Seminary and Richmond Theological Seminary would come together to form Virginia Union University (VUU) in Richmond and land for a new campus was purchased. Over 100 years later, VUU's 84-acre (340,000 m^{2}) campus is still located there, at 1500 North Lombardy Street in Richmond's North Side.

== Notable students ==
Students at Wayland between 1867 and 1897 included a number of individuals who became famous African American citizens of the United States. These include:

- Alfred L. Cralle, inventor of the ice cream scoop
- Kate Drumgoold, author of A Slave Girl's Story: Being an account of Kate Drumgoold (1898)
- Henry N. Jeter, Newport, Rhode Island minister
- Harvey Johnson, Baltimore, Maryland pastor and early civil rights activist
- Robert S. Laws, 19th century American Baptist pastor who founded two churches with active congregations in the 21st century
- Nellie Arnold Plummer, teacher and author
- Adam Clayton Powell, Sr., pastor of Abyssinian Baptist Church in Harlem (New York City), civil rights activist, speaker and author
- John Wesley Terry, Chicago labor leader
- Booker T. Washington, prominent educator and political figure
- Willis McGlascoe Carter, Virginia educator and civil rights leader
