= Nels Corey =

American football coach (1915–2013)

Biographical details
- Born: June 4, 1915; Lynn, Massachusetts, U.S.
- Died: August 10, 2013 (aged 98); Gardiner, Maine, U.S.

Coaching career (HC unless noted)

Football
- 1939–1941: Pomfret School
- 1945–1946: Governor Dummer Academy (assistant)
- 1947–1948: Maine Central Institute
- 1949–1950: Colby (assistant)
- 1951: Colby
- 1952–1953: Maine Central Institute
- 1954: Williams (freshmen)
- 1955–1958: Bowdoin (assistant)
- 1959–1964: Bowdoin
- 1965–1979: Hotchkiss School
- 1980: Maine (offensive backfield)

Men's basketball
- 1939–1942: Pomfret School
- 1948–1949: Maine Central Institute
- 1952–1954: Maine Central Institute
- 1954–1957: Bowdoin (assistant)

Baseball
- 1940–1942: Pomfret School
- 1946–1947: Governor Dummer Academy (assistant)
- 1956: Bowdoin (assistant)

Men's ice hockey
- 1946–1947: Governor Dummer Academy (assistant)
- 1950–1952: Colby
- 1954–1955: Williams (freshmen)
- 1955–1957: Bowdoin (assistant)
- 1957–1958: Bowdoin

Men's lacrosse
- 1958–1965: Bowdoin
- 1966–1980: Hotchkiss School

Accomplishments and honors

Championships
- 2 MIAA (1960, 1963)

Charles Nelson "Nels" Corey Jr. (June 4, 1915 – August 10, 2013) was an American football coach. He served as the head football coach at Colby College in Waterville, Maine in 1951 and at Bowdoin College in Brunswick, Maine from 1959 to 1964.

== Biography ==
Corey was born in Lynn, Massachusetts and grew up in Newburyport, Massachusetts. He attended Newburyport High School and the Governor Dummer Academy. He was a three sport athlete (football, ice hockey, and baseball) at Bowdoin College and was captain of the Bowdoin football team in 1938.

Corey began his coaching career at the Pomfret School in Pomfret, Connecticut. He served in the United States Navy during World War II and resumed his career at Governor Dummer in 1945 as an assistant football, baseball, and hockey coach. He was the head football coach at the Maine Central Institute in Pittsfield, Maine in 1947 and 1948 and his team won the Maine Prep School title both seasons. He was also the school's basketball coach during the 1948-49 season.

In 1949, Corey became an assistant football coach under Walt Holmer at Colby College. He also served as the school's head men's hockey coach. He became the head football coach in 1951 and led the Mules to a 2–5 record. He resigned unexpectedly on May 21, 1952 to return to MCI.

In 1954, Corey became the freshman hockey and football coach at Williams College. The following year, he returned to Bowdoin as assistant football, basketball, baseball, and hockey coach. He was promoted to varsity hockey coach in 1957. Following the 1958 season, he succeeded the retiring Adam Walsh as head football coach and gave up his hockey duties. During his six seasons as head coach, the Polar Bears sent 22-20-1 and won the Maine Intercollegiate Athletic Association championship twice (1960 and 1963). Following the 1964 season, he announced he was leaving college coaching.

From 1965 to 1980, Corey was the athletic director and head football and lacrosse coach at the Hotchkiss School in Lakeville, Connecticut. He retired to Gardiner, Maine and served as the offensive backfield coach for part of the 1980 Maine Black Bears football season while coach Stump Merrill was managing the Nashville Sounds. In 1989, his son, Charles N. Corey III, was named men's hockey coach at Colby. Corey remained in Gardiner until his death on August 11, 2013 at the age of 98.
