= Virginia Union University =

Private Baptist university in Richmond, Virginia, US

- Former names: Colver Institute (1865–1886); Richmond Theological Institute (1886–1899); Wayland Seminary (1865–1899); Hartshorn Memorial College (1883–1932)
- Motto: The Lord Will Provide
- Type: Private historically black university
- Established: 1865; 161 years ago
- Endowment: $29 million
- President: Hakim Lucas
- Students: 1,662
- Location: Richmond, Virginia, United States; 37°33′45″N 77°27′4″W
- Campus: 84 acres (34 ha); Urban
- Colors: Maroon and Steel
- Nickname: Panthers
- Sporting affiliations: NCAA Division II – CIAA
- Website: vuu.edu
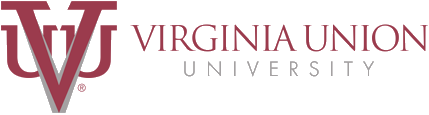
- Virginia Union University
- U.S. National Register of Historic Places
- Virginia Landmarks Register
- Location: 1500 N. Lombardy St., Richmond, Virginia, United States
- Area: 11 acres (4.5 ha)
- Built: 1899
- Architect: John H. Coxhead
- Architectural style: Richardsonian Romanesque
- NRHP reference No.: 82004590
- VLR No.: 127-0354

Significant dates
- Added to NRHP: July 26, 1982
- Designated VLR: June 16, 1981

Virginia Union University is a private historically black university in Richmond, Virginia, United States.

== History ==
The American Baptist Home Mission Society (ABHMS) founded the school as Richmond Theological Institute in 1865 shortly after Union troops took control of Richmond, Virginia, at the end of the American Civil War, for African-American freedmen to enter into the ministry. The college had the first academic library at a historically black college or university (HBCU), building the library the same year the college was established.

Its mission was soon expanded to offer courses and programs at college, high school, and preparatory levels, to both men and women. This effort was the beginning of Virginia Union University. Separate branches of the National Theological Institute were set up in Washington, D.C., and Richmond, Virginia, with classes beginning in 1867. In Washington, the school became known as Wayland Seminary, named in commemoration of Francis Wayland, former president of Brown University and a leader in the anti-slavery struggle. The first and only president there was George Mellen Prentiss King, who administered Wayland for thirty years (1867–1897). Famous students there included Booker T. Washington and Adam Clayton Powell, Sr.

Beginning in 1867, Colver Institute was housed in a building long known as Lumpkin's Jail, a former "slave jail" owned by Mary Ann Lumpkin, the African-American widow of the deceased white owner. It became Richmond Theological Institute (formerly Colver) and joined with Wayland Seminary of Washington in 1899 to form Virginia Union University at Richmond.

In 1932, the women's college Hartshorn Memorial College, established in Richmond in 1883, became a part of Virginia Union University. Storer College, a historically black Baptist college in West Virginia founded in 1867, merged its endowment with Virginia Union in 1964.

List of presidents
Name	Term
Malcolm MacVicar	1899–1904
George Rice Hovey	1904–1918
William John Clark	1919–1941
John Malcus Ellison*	1941–1955
Samuel Dewitt Proctor	1955–1960
Thomas Howard Henderson	1960–1970
Allix Bledsoe James	1970–1979
David Thomas Shannon	1979–1985
S. Dallas Simmons	1985–1999
Bernard Wayne Franklin	1999–2003
Belinda C. Anderson	2003–2008
Claude G. Perkins	2009–2016
Joseph F. Johnson	2016–2017 (acting)
Hakim J. Lucas	2017–present
*first alumnus and African-American to serve as president of the university

== Academics ==
The university is divided into four main schools:

- Evelyn Reid Syphax School of Education and Interdisciplinary Studies
- School of Arts and Sciences
- Samuel DeWitt Proctor School of Theology
- Sydney Lewis School of Business

=== Theology program ===
Virginia Union University's Theological training program is called The Samuel DeWitt Proctor School of Theology. James Henry Harris, the early American civil rights advocate, was a graduate. The school is a member of the Washington Theological Consortium.

== Student activities ==
There are over 20 student organizations, including several fraternities and sororities.

== Athletics ==
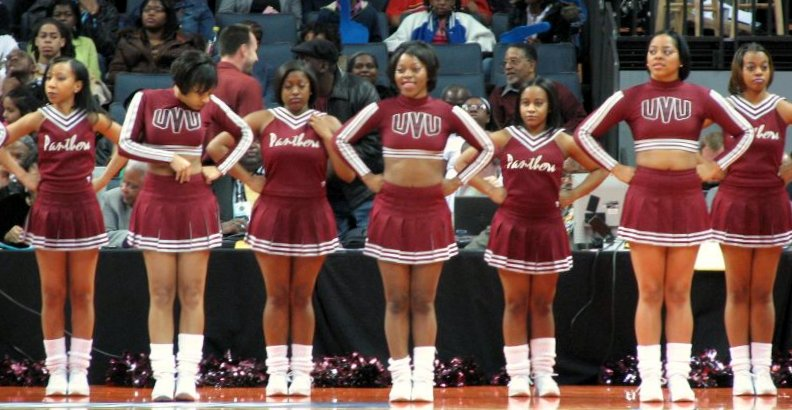
Panthers Cheer Squad

Virginia Union competes in the NCAA Division II in the Eastern Division of the Central Intercollegiate Athletic Association. The school has varsity teams in men's basketball, football, cross country, golf, tennis and track and field, and in women's basketball, bowling, cross country, tennis and track and field, softball and volleyball.

In 2018, both Virginia Union University's DII Men & Women's Basketball Teams won the CIAA Championship. Virginia Union plays basketball and volleyball in the Barco-Stevens Hall, built as the Belgian Building for the 1939 New York World's Fair. The building, which has stone reliefs depicting the Belgian Congo, was one of thirteen facilities designated as "unique" by NCAA News in 2005. The building was awarded to the university in 1941 and moved to its present location in 1943. The basketball team began using the facility in early 1947.

== Affiliations ==
The university is affiliated with the American Baptist Churches USA.

== Notable alumni ==
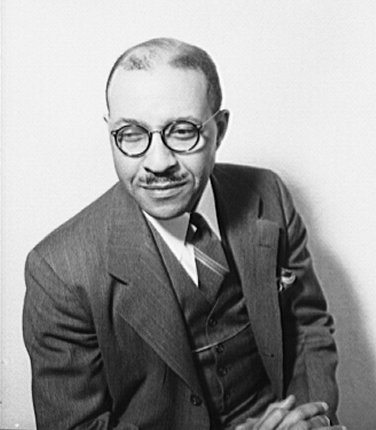
Charles S. Johnson

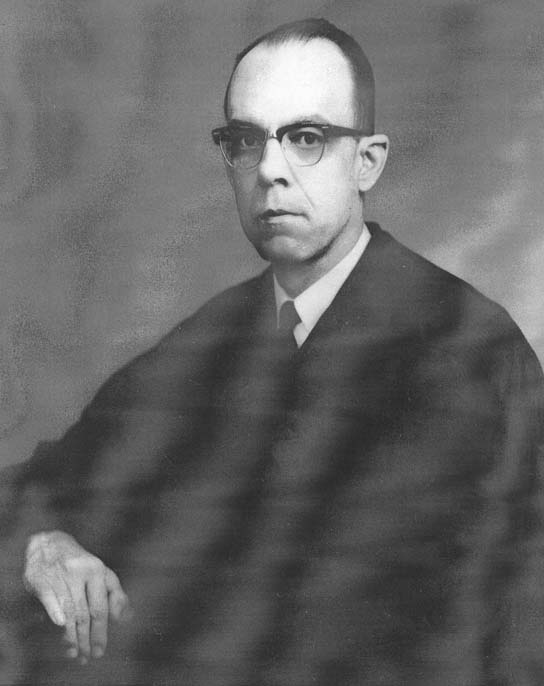
Spottswood William Robinson III

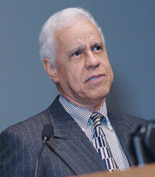
Douglas Wilder

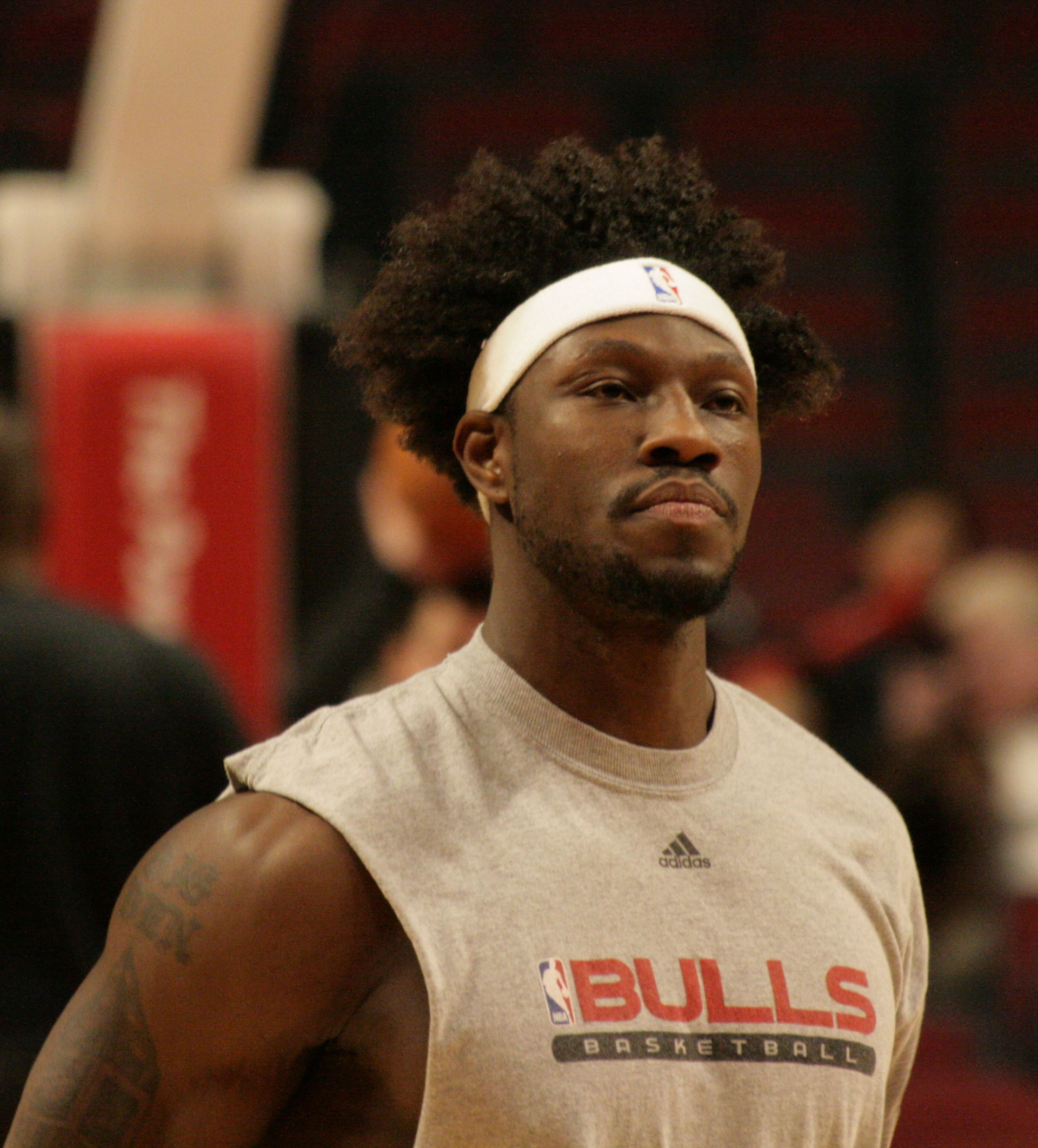
Ben Wallace

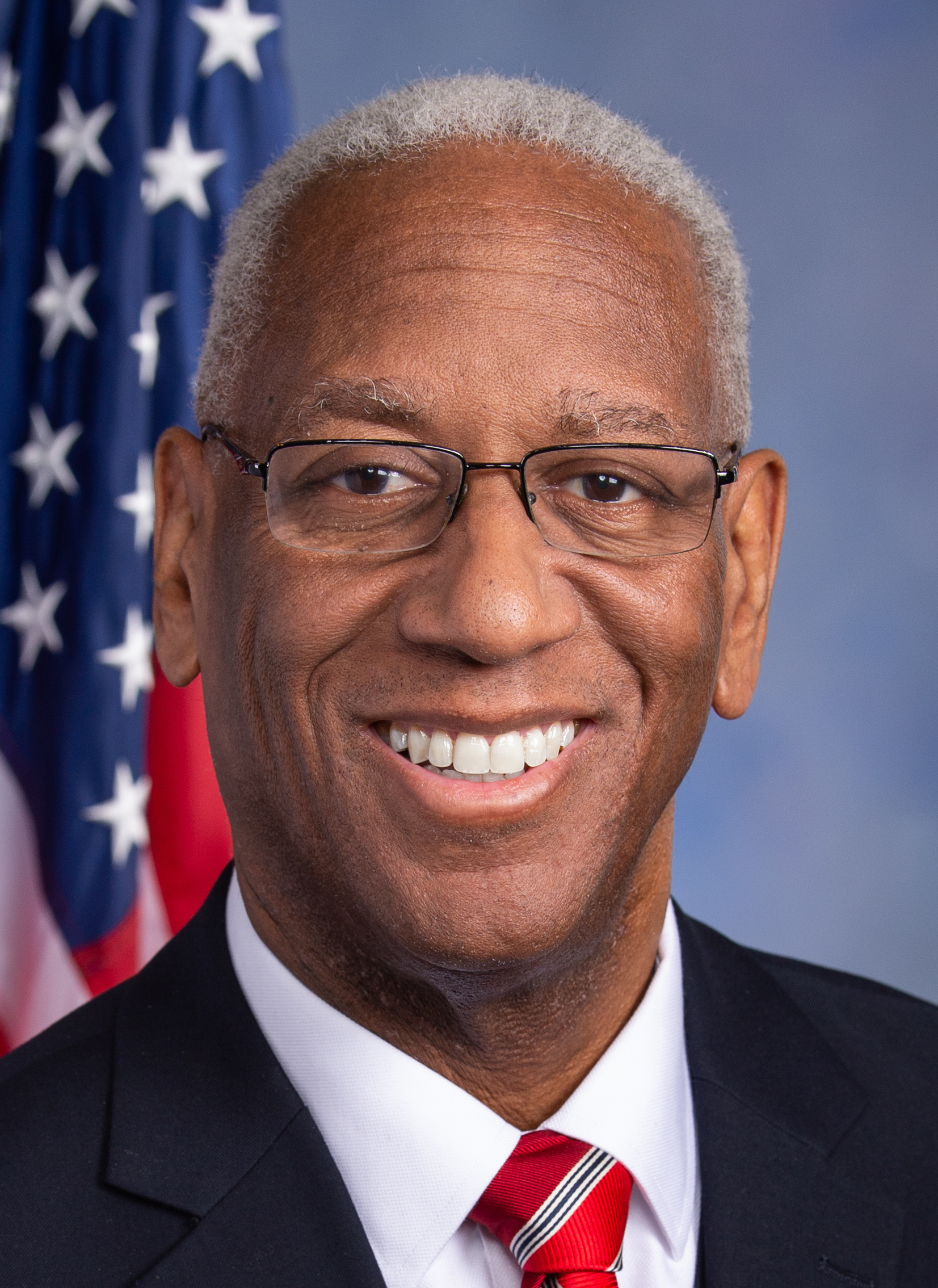
Donald McEachin

Name	Class year	Notability	Reference(s)
Roger Anderson		NFL player	
James Atkins	2002	Former NFL player	
Mamye BaCote	1961	Virginia House of Delegates (2004-2016)	
Darius Bea	attended two years	Negro league outfielder and pitcher	
Bessye J. Bearden	1900s	Journalist and social activist; mother of artist Romare Bearden	
Leslie Garland Bolling	1924	Early 20th-century wood carver	
Simeon Booker	1941	Journalist, first African-American reporter for The Washington Post	
Michael Brim	1988	Former National Football League player	
Roslyn M. Brock	1987	Chairman of the National Association for the Advancement of Colored People (NAACP)	
Homer S. Brown		Judge, civil rights leader, and state representative in Pittsburgh, Pennsylvania	
Henry Allen Bullock	1928	Historian, winner of the Bancroft Prize	
Emmett C. Burns, Jr.		Maryland House of Delegates (1995–2006)	
Robert Prentiss Daniel	1924	President of Shaw and Virginia State universities for more than 30 years in total	
Terry Davis	1989	Former NBA player	
Will Downing	attended	R&B singer	
AJ English	1990	Former professional basketball player	
Walter Fauntroy	1955	Civil rights leader, minister, former Member of the U.S. House of Representatives, from Washington, D.C.'s at-large district and was a candidate for the 1972 Democratic presidential nomination	
Samuel Lee Gravely, Jr.	1948	First African-American to reach the rank of admiral in the United States Navy	
Abram Lincoln Harris	1922	Economist; chair, Economics Dept. Howard University (1936–1945); professor, University of Chicago	
Nat Horne	1951	Dancer, choreographer, theatre director and educator	
Pete Hunter	2002	Former National Football League player	
Cornelius Johnson	1967	Former NFL player	
Charles Spurgeon Johnson	1916	First black president of Fisk University	
Lyman T. Johnson	1930	Integrated the University of Kentucky	
Dwight Clinton Jones	1967	Mayor of Richmond, Virginia (2009–2016)	
Eugene Kinckle Jones	1906	Member of the Black Cabinet under President Franklin D. Roosevelt and a founder of Alpha Phi Alpha fraternity	
Leontine T. Kelly	1960	Bishop of the United Methodist Church	
Delores McQuinn	1976	Virginia House of Delegates (2009-present)	
Tamarat Makonnen	1994	Film director, producer and writer	
Henry L. Marsh	1956	First African-American mayor of Richmond, Virginia and member of the Virginia Senate from the 16th district	
Benjamin Mays	1916-1917, transferred to Bates College	President of Morehouse College, mentor to Martin Luther King, Jr.	
Bai T. Moore		Liberian author and poet	
Charles Oakley		Professional basketball player	
Chandler Owen	1913	Writer, editor and early member of the Socialist Party of America.	
N. Scott Phillips	1983	Member, Maryland House of Delegates	
Wendell H. Phillips		Member, Maryland House of Delegates (1979–1987)	
Samuel DeWitt Proctor	1942	President of VUU and president of North Carolina Agricultural and Technical State University, where he made close acquaintance with then student body president Jesse Jackson	
Randall Robinson		Attorney, founder of TransAfrica	
Spottswood William Robinson III	1937	Prominent civil rights attorney, dean of Howard University Law School, first African American to be appointed to the United States District Court for the District of Columbia	
James R. Roebuck, Jr.	1966	Member of Pennsylvania House of Representatives, District 188	
Frank S. Royal	1961	Chairman of VUU's board; director of public companies; former president of the National Medical Association	
Herbert Scott	1974	National Football League player, 2-time All-Pro, 3-time Pro Bowl; Dallas Cowboys	
Charles Sherrod	1958	SNCC organizer and co-founder of the Albany Movement	
Clarence L. Townes Jr.	1948		
Wyatt T Walker		Activist, civil rights motivator, musician, theologian who gave letter to Martin Luther King from Coretta; close confidant and preacher	
Ben Wallace	1996	Professional basketball player, NBA Defensive Player of the Year, NBA Champion, Member of Basketball Hall of Fame; Detroit Pistons	
Douglas Wilder	1951	First African-American governor of Virginia (1990–1994) and mayor of Richmond (2005–2009)	
