= Adams (surname) =

Origin
- Meaning: "Son of Adam"
- Region of origin: England, Scotland

Other names
- Variant forms: Addams, MacAdam (in Scotland)

Adams is a common surname of English and Scottish origin, derived from the given name Adam. Related surnames include Addams and McAdam/MacAdam.

== People with the surname ==
=== Politics and law ===
- Alice Abadam (Welsh form of Adams) (1856–1940), Welsh suffragist, feminist, public speaker.
- A. A. Adams (1900–1985), American politician
- Abigail Adams (1744–1818), second First Lady of the United States and mother of John Quincy Adams, sixth President of the United States
- Alma Adams (born 1946), U.S. representative from North Carolina
- Annette Abbott Adams (1877–1956), judge of the California Court of Appeal
- Arlin Adams (1921–2015), judge of the United States Court of Appeals for the Third Circuit
- Barbara Adams (born 1962), Canadian politician
- Benjamin C. Adams (1847–1907), American politician
- Benjamin F. Adams (1822–1902), American politician
- Brock Adams (1927–2004), U.S. representative and U.S. senator from Washington
- Bryan Adams (politician) (born 1963), member of the Louisiana House of Representatives from Jefferson Parish
- Campbell W. Adams (1852–1930), New York state engineer and surveyor
- Carl S. Adams (1917–2019), American politician
- Charles C. Adams Jr. (born 1947), American international arbitration lawyer, civic activist
- Charles Francis Adams Sr. (1807–1886), U.S. congressman, ambassador
- Dick Adams (Australian politician) (born 1951), Australian politician
- Dorothy Adams, later known as Dorothy Williams (activist) (1928–2011), South African anti-apartheid activist
- Edward Hamlyn Adams (1777–1842), British merchant and politician.
- Ekene Abubakar Adams (1985–2024), Nigerian politician
- Elmer B. Adams (1842–1916), United States District Court judge
- Elmer Ellsworth Adams (1861–1950), American newspaper editor and politician
- Eric Adams (born 1960), Mayor of New York City (2022–2025)
- Floyd Adams Jr. (1945–2014), American politician
- Fraser L. Adams (1891–1979), mayor of Huntsville, Alabama
- Gabriel Adams (1790–1864), mayor of Pittsburgh, Pennsylvania
- Gerry Adams (born 1948), Irish republican politician, leader of Sinn Féin 1983–2018
- Grantley Herbert Adams (1898–1971), Barbadian politician
- Green Adams (1812–1884), United States congressman from Kentucky
- Hank Adams (1943–2020), Native American rights activist
- Henry Cullen Adams (1850–1906), U.S. representative from Wisconsin
- Irene Adams, Baroness Adams of Craigielea (born 1947), Scottish politician
- Isaac Adams (inventor) (1802–1883), American inventor and politician
- Isaac Adams (Maine politician) (1773–1834), American politician
- Isaac Adams (Wisconsin politician) (1825–1879), American politician
- J. C. Adams (politician), mayor of Phoenix Arizona and businessman
- J. J. Adams (1860–1935), American politician
- Jed C. Adams (1876–1935), judge of the United States Board of Tax Appeals
- Jesse A. Adams (1876–1940), American politician
- John Donley Adams (born 1973), American lawyer and politician
- John Adams (1735–1826), one of the Founding Fathers, first vice president of the United States and second president of the United States
- John Adams (Canadian general) (born 1942), Chief of the Canadian Security Establishment
- John Adams (New York politician) (1778–1854), U.S. congressman from New York
- John Adams (Virginia politician) (1773–1825), American politician
- John Quincy Adams (1767–1848), sixth president of the United States and son of John Adams, second president of the United States
- Judith Adams (politician) (1943–2012), Australian senator
- Junior Adams (born 1979), American football coach
- Jüri Adams (born 1947), Estonian politician
- Lawrence Adams (Mississippi politician) (1914–1994), American politician
- Leo G. Adams (born 1937), American politician
- Les Adams (politician) (born 1974), American politician and judge from Virginia
- Marshal T. Adams (1886–1987), American politician
- Mumuni Adams (1907–?), Ghanaian politician
- N. Q. Adams (1839–1922), American politician
- Natalie Adams (born 1965), Australian judge
- Nigel Adams (born 1966), British politician
- Philip Adams (1915–2001), British diplomat
- Platt Adams (politician) (1792–1887), New York politician
- Robert Adams Jr. (1849–1906), U.S. representative from Pennsylvania
- Robert H. Adams (1792–1830), U.S. senator from Mississippi
- Salisbury Adams (1925–2004), American lawyer and politician
- Samuel Adams (1722–1803), American revolutionary
- Samuel Adams (Arkansas politician) (1805–1850), governor of Arkansas
- Simeon R. Adams (1814–1860), American politician and newspaper owner
- Teresa Adams (1869–1947), American civil rights activist and suffragist
- Thomas Adams (politician) (1730–1788), American Continental Congressman
- Tom Adams (politician) (1931–1985), Barbadian politician, the prime minister of Barbados
- W. C. Adams (1884–1972), American politician
- Washington Adams (1814–1883), justice of the Supreme Court of Missouri

=== Sports ===
- Alvan Adams (born 1954), American basketball player
- Amare Adams (born 2006), American football player
- Amos Adams (footballer) (1880–1941), English footballer
- Andre Adams (born 1975), New Zealand cricketer
- Ashley Adams (1955–2015), Australian Paralympic shooting medallist
- Austin Adams (baseball, born 1986), American baseball player
- Austin Adams (baseball, born 1991), American baseball player
- Babe Adams (1882–1968), American baseball pitcher
- Blair Adams (born 1991), English footballer
- Blake Adams (born 2000), American baseball pitcher
- Bob Adams (1920s pitcher) (1901–1996), American National League baseball pitcher
- Bob Adams (1930s pitcher) (1907–1970), American National League baseball pitcher
- Bob Adams (American football) (born 1946), US American football player
- Bobby Adams (1921–1997), American Major League Baseball infielder
- Boyd Adams (1934–2025), American racing driver
- Brendan Adams (born 2000), American basketball player in the Israeli Basketball Premier League
- Bud Adams (1923–2013), owner of American professional football team, Tennessee Titans
- Carl Adams (born 1942), American racing driver
- Charles Adams (1876–1947), American businessman and Boston Bruins founder
- Ché Adams (born 1996), English footballer who plays for Scotland
- Chris Adams (cricketer) (born 1970), English cricketer
- Chris Adams (footballer) (1927–2012), English footballer
- Chris Adams (rugby league) (born 1986), Australian rugby league footballer
- Chris Adams (wrestler) (1955–2001), English judoka and professional wrestler
- Chuck Adams (born 1971), American tennis player
- Danesha Adams (born 1986), American footballer (soccer)
- Danielle Adams (born 1989), American basketball player
- Darren Adams (born 1974), English footballer
- Davante Adams (born 1992), American football player
- Davey Adams (1883–1948), Scottish footballer
- Dennis Adams (boxer) (1934–1971), South African boxer
- Derek Adams (born 1975), Scottish footballer and manager
- Diane Adams, Canadian curler, World champion
- Doc Adams (1814–1899), American baseball player and executive, credited with inventing the shortstop position
- Don Adams (basketball) (1947–2013), American basketball player
- Eddie Adams (racing driver), American racing driver
- Eli Adams (born 2002), Australian footballer
- Emery Adams (1911–1960), American baseball player
- Ernie Adams (footballer, born 1922) (1922–2009), English footballer
- Ernie Adams (footballer, born 1948) (born 1948), English footballer
- Gaines Adams (1983–2010), American football player
- Gary Adams (baseball) (born 1939), American college baseball coach
- Georgia Adams (born 1993), English women's cricketer
- Harry Adams (baseball umpire) (1863–1941), American Major League Baseball umpire
- Hassan Adams (born 1984), American basketball player
- Isaiah Adams (born 2000), American football player
- Jack Adams (1894–1968), National Hockey League player, coach, and manager
- Jalen Adams (born 1995), American basketball player for Hapoel Jerusalem in the Israeli Basketball Premier League
- Jamal Adams (born 1995), American football player
- Jamie Adams (footballer) (born 1987), Scottish footballer
- Jen Adams (born 1980), Australian lacrosse coach and former player
- Jeff Adams (born 1970), Canadian wheelchair racer
- Jens Adams (born 1992), Belgian cyclist
- Jimmy Adams (racing driver) (born 1972), US racecar driver
- Jordan Adams (basketball, born 1981) (born 1981), American-Canadian basketball player
- Jordan Adams (basketball, born 1994) (born 1994), American basketball player
- Jordyn Adams (born 1999), American baseball player
- Josh Adams (American football) (born 1996), American football player
- Junior Adams (born 1979), American football coach
- Katrina Adams (born 1968), American professional tennis player
- Keion Adams (born 1995), American football player
- Kenny Adams (1940–2025), American boxing trainer
- Kevyn Adams (born 1974), American ice hockey player
- Kola Adams (born 1980), Nigerian footballer
- Layonel Adams (1994–2026), Russian footballer, brother of Lyukman
- Lyukman Adams (born 1988), Russian triple jumper
- Marcus Adams (footballer) (born 1993), Australian rules footballer
- Martin Adams (born 1956), English darts player, 2007 British Darts Organisation World Champion
- Matt Adams (born 1988), American baseball player
- Matthew Adams (American football) (born 1995), American football player
- Maximo Adams (born 2008), American basketball player
- Michael Adams (basketball) (born 1963), American NBA basketball player, college basketball
- Michael Adams (chess player) (born 1971), English chess grandmaster
- Micky Adams (born 1961), English football (soccer) manager
- Mike Adams (born 1974), professional American football player
- Montravius Adams (born 1995), American football player
- Myles Adams (born 1998), American football player
- Neil Adams (born 1958), British judoka
- Neil Adams (born 1965), English football (soccer) player
- Nick Adams (born 1948), British racing driver
- Nicola Adams (born 1982), English boxer
- Ondigui Adams (born 1987), Cameroonian football (soccer) player
- Philippe Adams (born 1969), Belgian Formula One driver
- Phillip Adams (American football) (1988–2021), American football player
- Rex Adams (1928–2014), English footballer
- Riley Adams (born 1996), American baseball player
- Rodney Adams (born 1994), American football player
- Ronnie Adams (1916–2004), British rally driver
- Roosevelt Adams (born 1994), Filipino-American basketball player
- Russ Adams (born 1980), American baseball player with the Toronto Blue Jays
- Sadick Adams (born 1990), Ghanaian footballer
- Sam Adams (born 1973), US American football player
- Sam Adams Sr. (1948–2015), US American football player
- Shawn Adams (born 1974), Canadian curler
- Sidney Adams (1904–1945), English cricketer
- Spencer Adams (1898–1970), American Baseball player
- Stephen Adams (born 1989), Ghanaian football player
- Steven Adams (born 1993), New Zealand basketball player; half-brother of Valerie Adams (below)
- Stewart Adams (ice hockey) (1904–1978), Canadian ice hockey player
- Taeyanna Adams (born 2002), Micronesian swimmer
- Tony Adams (born 1966), English footballer and manager
- Travis Adams (born 2000), American baseball player
- Trey Adams (born 1997), American football player
- Tyler Adams (born 1999), American soccer player
- Valerie Adams (born 1984), New Zealand shot putter
- Vicki Adams (born 1989), Scottish curler
- Vicki Adams (trick rider) (born 1951), rodeo performer
- W. Adams, English football manager of Shrewsbury Town Football Club between 1905 and 1912

=== Literature and journalism ===
- Bristow Adams (1875–1957), American journalist, forester, professor, illustrator
- Brooks Adams (1848–1927), American historian and a critic of capitalism
- Carol J. Adams (born 1951), American writer, feminist, and animal rights advocate
- Cecil Adams, pseudonym of author(s) of a syndicated question-and-answer column, The Straight Dope
- Douglas Adams (1952–2001), British comic radio dramatist and writer, author of The Hitchhiker's Guide to the Galaxy series
- Eddie Adams (1933–2004), American photojournalist
- Ellinor Davenport Adams (1858–1913), British journalist and writer
- Flora Adams (1840–1910), American author and clubwoman
- Francis Adams (writer) (1862–1893), Australian essayist, poet, dramatist, novelist and journalist
- Franklin P. Adams (1881–1960), American columnist (under the pen name F.P.A.), writer, and wit
- Hannah Adams (1755–1831), American historian and theologian
- Harriet Adams (1892–1982), American novelist and publisher
- Henry Adams (1838–1918), American historian, journalist, and novelist
- J. C. Adams (born 1970), American porn author
- Kay Adams (sportscaster) (born 1986), American sportscaster and television personality
- Lois Bryan Adams (1817–1870), American writer, journalist, newspaper editor
- Mary Hall Adams (1816–1860), American editor, letter writer
- Mary Mathews Adams (1840–1902), American writer, philanthropist
- Phillip Adams (born 1939), Australian broadcaster, columnist
- Poppy Adams (born 1972), British television director/producer and novelist
- R. J. Q. Adams (born 1943), American historian and professor
- Randolph Greenfield Adams (1892–1951), American librarian and historian
- Richard Adams (1920–2016), British novelist, author of Watership Down and The Plague Dogs
- Roy Adams (born 1940), Canadian author, newspaper columnist, human rights activist, and academic
- Samuel Hopkins Adams (1871–1958), American journalist and short story writer
- Sarah Fuller Flower Adams (1805–1848), English poet, hymn writer

=== Music ===
- Ben Adams (born 1981), British singer, member of the boy band A1
- Bryan Adams (born 1959), Canadian singer, guitarist, and songwriter
- Charlie Adams (drummer) (born 1954), American musician
- Dave Adams (musician) (1938–2016), English musician and songwriter
- Derroll Adams (1925–2000), American folk musician
- Glen Adams (1945–2010), Jamaican musician
- Gregory Adams (born 1987), American musician, guitarist, and songwriter
- India Adams (1927–2020), American singer
- Jim Adams, American thrash metal guitarist with the band Defiance
- John Adams (composer) (born 1947), American minimalist composer
- John Luther Adams (born 1953), American composer
- Johnny Adams (1932–1998), American R&B singer
- Louise Adams (born 1983), Australian musician
- Oleta Adams (born 1953), American soul and jazz singer
- Pepper Adams (1930–1986), American jazz saxophonist and composer
- Pierrette Adams (born 1962), singer from the Republic of the Congo
- Ryan Adams (born 1974), American alternative-country and rock and roll singer/songwriter
- Ryan Adams (born 1993), birth name of Rylo Rodriguez, American rapper
- Suzanne Adams (1872–1953), American operatic soprano
- Victoria Adams (born 1974), birth name of British pop singer Victoria Beckham, known as "Posh Spice"
- William James Adams Jr. (born 1975), birth name of will.i.am, American rapper, singer, songwriter and record producer
- Yolanda Adams (born 1961), American gospel singer

=== Art and photography ===
- Ansel Adams (1902–1984), American photographer
- Arthur Adams (comics) (born 1963), American comic book artist
- Clinton Adams (1918–2002), American painter and lithographer
- Elinor Proby Adams (1885–1945), English painter
- Gina Adams (born 1965), Ojibwe-American cross-media artist and activist
- Harriet Isabel Adams (1863–1952), British artist and scientific illustrator
- Herbert Adams (sculptor) (1858–1945), American sculptor
- Igshaan Adams (born 1982), South African textile artist
- J. Ottis Adams (1851–1927), American Impressionist painter
- JJ Adams (born 1978), British mixed media artist
- Lee Adams (born 1970), British performance artist
- Mark Adams (artist) (1925–2006), American painter, mosaicist
- Mark Adams (photographer) (born 1949), New Zealand photographer
- Marta Adams (1891–1978), German painter, sculptor
- Neal Adams (1941–2022), American comic book artist
- Phoebe Adams (born 1953), American visual artist
- Robert Adams (photographer) (born 1937), American photographer
- Scott Adams (1957–2026), American author and cartoonist, creator of the Dilbert comic strip
- Theo Adams (born 1989), British performance artist
- Tracey Adams (born 1954), American expressionist painter
- Wayman Elbridge Adams (1883–1959), American portrait painter

=== Dance ===
- Precious Adams, American ballet dancer

=== Drama and television ===
- Abel Adams (1879–1938), Finnish film producer
- Amy Adams (born 1974), American actress
- Beverly Adams (born 1945), Canadian-born actress
- Brian Adams (wrestler) (1964–2007), American professional wrestler
- Brooke Adams (born 1949), American actress
- Carol Adams (1918–2012), American actress
- Cecily Adams (1958–2004), American actress, daughter of Don Adams
- Chris Adams (1955–2001), English model and professional wrestler
- CJ Adams (born 2000), American actor
- Don Adams (1923–2005), American actor, comedian and director
- Edie Adams (1927–2008), American comedienne, actress, singer and businesswoman
- Fran Adams, American actress
- Jane Adams (born 1965), American actress
- Joey Adams (1911–1999), American author and comedian
- Joey Adams (born 1968), American actress
- Julie Adams (1926–2019), American actress
- Kathryn Adams (1893–1959), American silent film actress
- Kelly Adams (born 1979), English actress
- Marla Adams (1938–2024), American actress
- Mary Kay Adams (born 1962), American actress
- Maud Adams (born 1945), Swedish model and actress
- Maude Adams (1872–1953), American stage actress
- Nick Adams (1931–1968), American actor and screenwriter
- Nykiya Adams (born 2012), English child actress
- Patrick J. Adams (born 1981), Canadian actor
- Rahart Adams (born 1996), Australian actor
- Stanley Adams (1915–1977), American actor and film writer
- Stella Adams (1883–1961), American actress
- Toni Adams (1964–2010), American professional female wrestler
- Tony Adams (1940–2005), Welsh actor
- Trudy Adams, American actress and professional wrestler

=== Models ===
- Stephanie Adams (1970–2018), American Playboy model and author

=== Military ===
- Charles Francis Adams Jr. (1835–1915), American Civil War General and president of the Union Pacific Railroad
- Charles Francis Adams III (1866–1954), U.S. Navy secretary
- Daniel Weisiger Adams (1821–1872), American Civil War Confederate General
- Donald E. Adams (1921–1952), American pilot and Korean War flying ace
- James Frank Adams (1844–1922), American Civil War Medal of Honor recipient
- John G. B. Adams (1841–1900), American Civil War Officer and Medal of Honor recipient
- Robert Bellew Adams (1856–1928), Scottish recipient of the Victoria Cross
- Samuel Adams (naval officer) (1912–1942), U.S. Navy officer

=== Science, medicine, and engineering ===
- Amanda Adams (born 1976), American author and archaeologist
- Arthur Adams (1820–1878), British physician and naturalist
- Charles Hitchcock Adams (1868–1951), U.S. astronomer
- Clarence Raymond Adams (1898–1965), American mathematician
- Douglas Q. Adams, American linguist
- Edward Dean Adams (1846–1931), American engineer, financier, and scientist, Niagara Falls hydroelectric dam engineer, recipient of the 1926 John Fritz Medal
- Edwin Plimpton Adams (1878–1956), American physicist
- Emily Adams, British molecular diagnostician
- Francis Adams (1796–1861), Scottish medical doctor and translator of Greek medical works
- Fred Adams (born 1961), American astrophysicist
- Henry Adams (1858–1929), American architectural engineer
- Henry Percy Adams (1865–1930), English architect
- Jean Adams, epidemiologist
- Jeanne Clare Adams (1921–2007), American computer scientist
- Johann Friedrich Adam (1780–1838), Russian botanist known by the author abbreviation "Adams"
- John Bodkin Adams (1899–1983), Irish-British physician and suspected serial killer
- John Couch Adams (1819–1892), British mathematician and astronomer
- Karl Adams (mathematician) (1811–1849), Swiss mathematician and teacher
- Matthew Algernon Adams (1836–1913), British medical doctor and chemist
- Michael J. Adams (1930–1967), American aviator and NASA astronaut
- Otto Eugene Adams (1889–1968), American architect
- Patch Adams (born 1945), American physician, social activist and clown
- Raymond Delacy Adams (1911–2008), American neurologist
- Robert Adams (1540–1595), British architect and surveyor
- Robert Adams (1809–1870), British firearms designer
- Robert McCormick Adams Jr. (1926–2018), U.S. anthropologist
- Roger Adams (1889–1971), American organic chemist
- Stewart Adams (chemist) (1923–2019), British chemist
- Tarn Adams (born 1978), American mathematician and indie video game creator
- Thomas Adams (1871–1940), Scottish architect and urban planner
- Walter Sydney Adams (1876–1956), US astronomer
- William Adams (locomotive engineer) (1823–1904), British locomotive engineer
- William Adams (oculist) (1783–1827), British ophthalmic surgeon
- William Bridges Adams (1797–1872), British author, inventor, and locomotive engineer

=== Other ===
- Adams baronets, a 17th and 18th century English baronetcy
- Barbara Adams (Egyptologist) (1945–2002), British Egyptologist
- Bartlett Adams (1776–1828), American stonecutter
- Briel Adams-Wheatley, American beauty influencer
- Charles Francis Adams IV (1910–1999), American: president of Raytheon Company
- Charles Kendall Adams (1835–1902), American educator and historian
- Charlotte Adams (1859–?), Australian, first European woman to climb to the peak of Mount Kosciuszko
- Clifford Adams (fl. 1990s–2010s), computer programmer
- Edward Robert Adams (born 1934), South African Roman Catholic bishop
- Eliphalet Adams (1677–1753), American Puritan minister
- Fannie Phelps Adams (1917–2016), American educator, activist
- Herbert Baxter Adams (1850–1901), American educator and historian
- Jane Kelley Adams (1852–1924), American educator
- JiDion Adams (born 2000), American Christian YouTuber and streamer
- John Adams (mutineer) (1766–1829), last survivor of the Bounty mutineers who settled on Pitcairn Island
- Kevin Adams (born 1962), American theatrical lighting designer
- Marcel Adams (1920–2020), Canadian real estate investor, billionaire, and Holocaust survivor
- Mary Ann Adams, or Kudnarto, the first Aboriginal woman to marry a British settler in the colony of South Australia in 1848
- Richard Adams (businessman) (born 1946), British fair trade organisation founder
- Richard Adams (religious writer) (c. 1626–1698), non-conforming English Presbyterian divine
- Robert Merrihew Adams (1937–2024), American philosopher
- Rolan Adams (1975–1991), victim of racially motivated murder in Southeast London
- Samuel Adams, American beer company
- Scott Adams (game designer) (born 1952), American computer game designer and programmer
- Shorland Adams (c1605–1664), British priest
- Thomas William Adams (1842–1919), New Zealand forestry pioneer
- Trudie Adams (born 1959), American woman who has been missing since 1978A
- Truly Adams (born c. 2010), American racing driver and karting champion
- Weaver W. Adams (1901–1963), American chess player
- William Adams (samurai) (1564–1620), English navigator and first Briton to reach Japan
- William Adams (Master of Pembroke) (1706–1789), English Master of Pembroke College, Oxford
- Zabdiel Adams (1739–1801), American minister and writer, cousin of President John Adams

=== Disambiguation lists ===
- Andrew Adams
- Arthur Adams
- Bernard Adams
- Bert Adams
- Brian Adams
- Charles Adams
- Charles Francis Adams
- Chris Adams
- Colin Adams
- Craig Adams
- Daniel Adams
- David Adams
- Don Adams
- Douglas Adams
- Edward Adams
- Francis Adams
- Frank Adams
- George Adams
- Greg Adams
- Henry Adams
- Herbert Adams
- James Adams
- Jimmy Adams
- John Adams
- Joseph Adams
- J. C. Adams (disambiguation)
- Keith Adams
- Lee Adams
- Mark Adams
- Matthew Adams
- Michael Adams
- Mike Adams
- Neil Adams
- Nick Adams
- Patrick Adams
- Paul Adams
- Richard Adams
- Rick Adams
- Robert Adams
- Roger Adams
- Samuel Adams
- Scott Adams
- Stanley Adams
- Stephen Adams
- Steve Adams
- Terry Adams
- Thomas Adams
- Tom Adams
- Tony Adams
- Walter Adams
- William Adams

== See also ==
- Adams (disambiguation)
- Adams (taxonomic authority)
- Adams political family
- Addams (disambiguation)
