= George Adams =

George Adams may refer to:

== Arts ==
- George Gammon Adams (1821–1898), English portrait sculptor and medallist
- George G. Adams (architect) (1850–1932), American architect from Lawrence, Massachusetts
- George Adams (musician) (1940–1992), American jazz musician

== Politics ==
- George Anson (politician, born 1731) (1731–1789), known as George Adams until 1773, British Whig politician and Staffordshire landowner
- George Adams (Mississippi judge) (1784–1844), American lawyer and political figure in Kentucky and Mississippi
- George Willison Adams (1799–1879), abolitionist and member of the Ohio General Assembly
- George Washington Adams (1801–1829), eldest son of John Quincy Adams
- George Adams (magistrate) (1804–1873), magistrate of the Pitcairn Islands, 1848
- George Madison Adams (1837–1920), U.S. representative from Kentucky
- George E. Adams (1840–1917), U.S. representative from Illinois
- George B. Adams (1845–1911), U.S. lawyer and federal judge
- George H. Adams (1851–1911), American Republican politician and lawyer

== Science and academia ==
- George Adams (scientist, died 1772) (c. 1709–1772), English instrument maker and scientific writer
- George Adams (scientist, died 1795) (1750–1795), his son, English instrument maker and scientific writer
- George Adams (translator) (1698–1768), English translator of Sophocles
- George Burton Adams (1851–1925), American medievalist historian at Yale University
- George Rollie Adams (born 1941), American educator and historian
- George W. Adams (academic) (1905–1981), chairman of Commission on Extension Courses and director of the University Extension at Harvard University

== Sports ==
- George Adams (American football) (born 1962), former American football running back
- George Adams (baseball) (1855–1920), American baseball player for the 1879 Syracuse Stars
- George Adams (basketball) (born 1949), retired American basketball player
- George Adams (footballer, born 1926) (1926–2011), Scottish football player (Leyton Orient)
- George Adams (footballer, born 1947), English football player (Peterborough United)
- George Adams (footballer, born 1950), Scottish football player and coach (director of football at Ross County)
- George C. Adams (1863–1900), head coach of the Harvard University football program

== Others ==
- George J. Adams (1811–1880), Mormon leader of failed colony in Palestine
- George James Adams (1811–1888), American textile manufacturer and abolitionist
- George Adams (businessman) (1839–1904), Australian publican and Tattersall's lottery founder
- George Adams (newspaperman) (1836–1918), Australian editor, proprietor, and land agent
- George Matthew Adams (1878–1962), newspaper columnist and founder of newspaper service
- George G. Adams (engineer) (born 1948), American mechanical engineer

== See also ==
- Adams George Archibald (1814–1892), Canadian lawyer and politician
- George Adam (born 1969), Scottish politician
- George Adams Post (1854–1925), Democratic member of the U.S. House of Representatives from Pennsylvania
- Adams (surname)
- Georgy Adams (born 1967), French Polynesian basketball player
