= Mayor Adams =

Mayor Adams may refer to:

== United States ==
- Benjamin C. Adams (1847–1906), mayor of Grenada, Mississippi (1896–1898)
- Billy Adams (politician) (1861–1954), mayor of Alamosa, Colorado
- Charles Francis Adams III (1866–1954), mayor of Quincy, Massachusetts (1896–1897)
- Charles H. Adams (New York politician) (1824–1902), mayor of Cohoes, New York (1870–1872)
- Charles H. Adams (Massachusetts journalist) (1859–1952), mayor of Melrose, Massachusetts (1915–1921)
- Charles Powell Adams (1831–1893), mayor of Hastings, Minnesota (1872–1873)
- Edwin Adams (politician) (1829–1928), mayor of South Norwalk, Connecticut (1881)
- Eric Adams (born 1960), mayor of New York City (2022–2025)
- Floyd Adams Jr. (1945–2014), mayor of Savannah, Georgia (1996–2003)
- Fraser L. Adams (1891–1979), mayor of Huntsville, Alabama (1922–1926)
- Gabriel Adams (1790–1864), mayor of Pittsburgh, Pennsylvania (1847–1849)
- Greg L. Adams (born 1952), mayor of York, Nebraska
- James Adams (Massachusetts politician) (1810–1880), mayor of Charlestown, Massachusetts (1854)
- Joe Adams (Missouri politician) (born 1944), mayor of University City, Missouri (1995–2010)
- John Adams (Virginia politician) (1773–1825), mayor of Richmond, Virginia (1819–1825)
- J. C. Adams (politician), mayor of Phoenix, Arizona (1897–1899; 1905)
- J. J. Adams (1860–1935), mayor of Bellefontaine, Mississippi
- Paul L. Adams (Michigan judge) (1908–1990), mayor of Sault Ste. Marie, Michigan (1938–1942)
- Sam Adams (Oregon politician) (born 1963), mayor of Portland, Oregon (2009–2013)
- T. Patton Adams (born 1943), mayor of Columbia, South Carolina (1986–1990)

== Other ==
- Carol Adams (politician) (born 1961), mayor of Kwinana, Australia (2006–2023)
- David Morgan Adams (1875–1943), mayor of Poplar, England (1934–1935)
- Johnny Ned Adams (born 1960), mayor of Kuujjuaq, Canada
- Robin Adams (politician), mayor of Norfolk Island, Australia (2016–2021)
- Samuel Hunter Adams (1878–1975), mayor of Calgary, Canada (1921–1923)
- Sir Thomas Adams, 1st Baronet (1586–1667/1668), Lord Mayor of the City of London (1645–1646)
- William Adams (1752–1811), mayor of Totnes, England (1780–1781; 1788–1789; 1797–1798)
- William G. Adams (1923–2005), mayor St John's, Canada (1965–1973)

== See also ==
- Adams (surname) § Politics and law
