= J. C. Adams (disambiguation) =

J. C. Adams (born 1970) is an American author, magazine editor, reporter and a gay pornographic film director.

J. C. Adams may also refer to:

- J. C. Adams (politician), mayor of Phoenix Arizona and businessman
- Jed C. Adams (1876–1835), American lawyer
- Jeanne Clare Adams (1921–2007), American computer scientist
- John Couch Adams (1819–1892), British astronomer

== See also ==
- J. C. Adams Stone Barn, a historic Romanesque Revival barn in Sun River, Montana, United States
