= James Wanklyn =

James Wanklyn may refer to:

- James Alfred Wanklyn (1834–1906), English analytical chemist
- James Leslie Wanklyn (1860–1919), British politician
