= Roger Adams (disambiguation) =

Roger Adams (1889–1971), an American organic chemist and president of the American Chemical Society

Roger Adams may also refer to:

- Roger Adams (printer) (c. 1681–1741), printer and bookseller
- Roger Adams (MP) (died 1405), Member of Parliament (MP) for Great Yarmouth

== See also ==
- Adams (surname)
- Roger Adam, French aircraft designer
