= Arthur Adams =

Arthur Adams may refer to:

- Arthur Adams (zoologist) (1820–1878), English physician, naturalist, and malacologist
- Arthur Henry Adams (1872–1936), New Zealand writer
- Arthur Adams (spy) (1885–1969), Soviet spy
- Artie Adams (Arthur Henry Adams, 1891–1969), Australian rules footballer for South Melbourne
- Arthur S. Adams (1896–1980), American university president
- Edward Adams (footballer) (Arthur Edward Adams, 1908–1981), English footballer who played for Tranmere Rovers
- Arthur Adams (singer) (born 1943), American blues guitarist and singer
- Arthur Adams (comics) (born 1963), American comic book artist
- Arthur A. Adams, mayor of Springfield, Massachusetts, 1919–1920

== See also ==
- Adams (surname)
