= Don Adams (disambiguation) =

Don Adams (1923–2005) was an American actor.

Don Adams may also refer to:

== Musicians ==
- Don Adams (country singer) (1941–2026), American country singer
- Don Adams (R&B singer) (1942–1995), Munich based Scottish singer
- Donald Adams (1928–1996), English opera singer and actor

== Sports ==
- Donald Adams (cricketer) (1880–1976), English cricketer
- Don Adams (boxer) (born c. 1930), British bare-knuckle boxer
- Don Adams (basketball) (1947–2013), American basketball player
- Don Adams (footballer) (1931–1993), English footballer
- Don Adams (1934–2020), better known as Bandy Adams, Australian rugby league footballer

== Other uses ==
- Don Alden Adams (1925–2019), American president of the Watch Tower Bible and Tract Society of Pennsylvania
- Don Adams (politician) (born 1938), American politician and legislator in Texas

== See also ==
- Donald Adams (disambiguation)
- Adams (surname)
