= Edward Adams =

Edward Adams may refer to:

== Sportspeople ==
- Ed Adams (sailor), sailor
- Edward Adams (footballer) (1908–1981), English footballer who played for Tranmere Rovers
- Edward Adams (boxer), British boxer
- Eddie Adams (racing driver), former American racecar driver
- Edward H. Adams (1910–1958), American college football and basketball coach

== Other people ==
- Edward Adams (surgeon) (1824–1856), English naval surgeon and naturalist
- Edward Hamlyn Adams (1777–1842), British member of parliament for Carmarthenshire
- Edward Joseph Adams (born 1944), American prelate of the Roman Catholic Church
- Edward Dean Adams (1846–1931), American businessman, banker and numismatist
- Edward J. Adams (1887–1921), American bank and train robber, killer
- Eddie Adams (photographer) (1933–2004), American photojournalist

== Fictional characters ==
- Dirk Diggler, alias of Eddie Adams, a character played by Mark Wahlberg in the film Boogie Nights

== See also ==
- Edward Adam (1768–1807), inventor of still modifications to improve chemical rectification
- Ted Adams (disambiguation)
- Adams (surname)
