= Matthew Adams =

Matthew Adams may refer to:

- Buddy Matthews (born 1988), born Matthew Adams, Australian professional wrestler
- Matthew Algernon Adams (1836–1913), British doctor
- Matt Adams (born 1988), American baseball player
- Matt Adams (umpire), Australian rules football umpire
- Matthew Adams (American football) (born 1995), American football linebacker
- Matthew J. Adams, American archaeologist
