= Lee Adams (disambiguation) =

Lee Adams (born 1924) is an American lyricist best known for his musical theatre collaboration with Charles Strouse

Lee or Leigh Adams may also refer to:

- Lee Adams (performance artist) (born 1970), British performance artist, curator and experimental film maker
- Leigh Adams (born 1971), Australian motorcycle speedway rider
- Leigh Adams (footballer) (born 1988), Australian rules footballer

== See also ==
- Adams (surname)
