= Donald Adams (disambiguation) =

Donald Adams (1928–1996) was an English opera singer and actor.

Donald Adams may also refer to:

- Donald Adams (cricketer) (1880–1976), English cricket player
- Donald E. Adams (1921–1952), American fighter pilot
- Donald Adams (sport shooter) in 1966 ISSF World Shooting Championships

== See also ==
- Don Adams (disambiguation)
