= Paul Adams =

Paul Adams may refer to:

== Academics ==
- Paul L. Adams (academic) (1915–1984), president of Roberts Wesleyan College and candidate for Governor of New York
- Paul Adams (scientist), British professor of neurobiology at Stony Brook University
- Paul C. Adams, professor of geography at University of Texas at Austin

== Politics ==
- Paul Adams (Massachusetts politician), Massachusetts politician
- Paul Adams (New Zealand politician) (born 1948), rally driver and former politician from New Zealand

== Sports ==
- Paul Adams (American football coach) (1936–2019), American football player and Hall of Fame high school coach
- Paul Adams (center) (1919–1995), American football player and coach
- Paul Adams (cricketer) (born 1977), South African cricketer
- Paul Adams (coach) (1921–1986), American football, cross country running, and track and field coach
- Paul Adams (sport shooter) (born 1992), Australian sport shooter
- Paul Adams (umpire) (born 1949), English cricket umpire

== Other ==
- Paul Adams (journalist) (born 1961), English BBC television news correspondent
- Paul Adams (musician) (born 1951), musician, writer, and musical instrument builder
- Paul Adams (property developer) (born 1949), New Zealand businessman and philanthropist
- Paul D. Adams (1906–1987), U.S. Army general
- Paul L. Adams (Michigan judge) (1908–1990), member of the Michigan Supreme Court
- Paul Adams (pilot) (1922–2013), World War II pilot with the Tuskegee Airmen

== See also ==
- Adams (surname)
- Paul Adam (disambiguation)
