= Greg Adams =

Greg Adams may refer to:

- Greg Adams (ice hockey, born 1963), retired Canadian hockey player
- Greg Adams (ice hockey, born 1960), retired Canadian hockey player
- Greg Adams (writer) (born 1970), American music writer and reissue producer
- Greg Adams (musician), trumpet player formerly with Tower of Power
- Greg L. Adams (born 1952), Nebraska legislator

== See also ==
- Adams (surname)
