= Andrew Adams =

Andrew Adams may refer to:

- Andrew Adams (American football) (born 1992), American football safety
- Andrew Adams (politician) (1736–1797), American lawyer, jurist, and political leader
- Andrew Leith Adams (1827–1883), Scottish physician, naturalist and geologist
- Andy Adams (writer) (1859–1935), American writer of western fiction
- Andrew Adams, character in Fear the Walking Dead

== See also ==
- Adams (surname)
