= Douglas Adams (disambiguation) =

Douglas Adams (1952–2001) was an English writer and dramatist.

Douglas or Doug Adams may also refer to:

- Douglas Adams (cricketer) (1876–1931), American cricketer
- Douglas Adams (engineer), American engineer
- Douglas Adams (painter) (1853–1920), British painter
- Douglas J. Adams, American admiral
- Douglas Q. Adams, American linguist and Indo-Europeanist
- J. Douglas Adams (1949–2026), American school superintendent
- Doug Adams (American football) (1949–1997), American football player
- Doug Adams (baseball) (born 1943), MLB player
- Doug Adams (music journalist), American music journalist and author
- Doug Adams (television producer), American television producer
- Doug Adams (cyclist) (1941–2023), Australian cyclist

== See also ==
- Doug Adam (1923–2001), Canadian ice hockey player
