= Christine Adams =

Christine Adams may refer to:

- Christine Adams (actress) (born 1974), English actress
- Christine Adams (athlete) (born 1974), German athlete

== See also ==
- Chris Adams (disambiguation)
