= Derric Van Rensburg =

Derric van Rensburg (born 1952 in Cape Town, South Africa) is an internationally known impressionist painter.

== Career ==
Since his first exhibition in Cape Town in 1976 van Rensburg has been commissioned by various clients including multinational corporate clients such as First National Bank, South African Airways, Price Waterhouse Coopers and Mobil. His work is internationally recognised and he has been rated as one of South Africa's top artists. British artist JJ Adams worked in van Rensburg's studio following his family's emigration to South Africa from the UK and cites him as one of his greatest influences.

van Rensburg's career was celebrated in a coffee table book published in 2007 to coincide with the artist's 55th birthday.
