= Hotel Adams =

Former hotel in Phoenix, Arizona

- Interactive map of the Hotel Adams area

General information
- Location: Phoenix, Arizona, United States
- Coordinates: 33°26′58″N 112°04′25″W
- Groundbreaking: 1896
- Opened: December 6, 1896
- Destroyed: May 17, 1910 second hotel demolished 1973

Technical details
- Floor count: 4
- Lifts/elevators: 1

Design and construction
- Developer: W.A. Guthrie

The Hotel Adams was a luxury hotel in Phoenix, Arizona. Built in 1896, the hotel burned to the ground in 1910. The blaze left two people dead and the territorial governor of Arizona homeless. The hotel was rebuilt on the same location in 1911 and imploded in 1973 to make way for a third hotel, currently the Renaissance.

== History ==
The Adams Hotel was founded by J. C. Adams, a newcomer to Phoenix in 1896 who served two terms as the city's mayor. The building's foundation had been laid by June 1896. Construction finished later that year and the hotel opened to guests in late November 1896, with a formal opening in December. The hotel also hosted the offices of the Maricopa Club, a local membership organisation, and the local chamber of commerce.

The Adams featured four stories, an elevator, a dining room, and 90 guest rooms, of which "two-thirds" had private toilets. At the time of the fire, the hotel also counted a barber and a shoe shine among its tenants.

=== Fire ===
Around 5:45 am on the morning of May 17, 1910, a fire broke out in the basement of Hotel Adams. The basement was used for storage for the hotel's pharmacy.

Arizona Territorial Governor Richard Elihu Sloan and his family were residing in the hotel at the time and were left homeless by the fire; the governor's daughter was saved by the night bell clerk Henry Willey, who was also the first person to spot the smoke coming from the basement. Willey and a porter were able to warn all of the guests of the hotel and a proper evacuation ensued. No deaths were initially reported, but two people died in the blaze. Damage was estimated at $250,000.

== Hotel Adams (1910–1973) ==
The hotel was quickly rebuilt after the fire. Only three days after the fire had consumed the first hotel, Adams had pitched in $75,000 for the rebuilding and, with clear demand for a modern hotel in the Phoenix area, an additional $43,000 was raised in only four minutes.

Work on the new hotel began in January 1911 and was scheduled to be completed by September. After a brief work stoppage relating to the potential for prohibition in Phoenix, the building opened in stages with guests arriving on November 6, 1911, just in time for the territorial fair. On its first day, the hotel's usual 178 rooms were expanded to 186, all of which were occupied. The wireless transmitter on the roof had opened a couple of weeks earlier, in October 1911, and wirelessly linked Arizona with California for the first time.

A nine-story addition was added in 1928, adding 112 rooms. Air conditioning was added in 1929 and the system was expanded in the 1930s, one of the first hotels in the world with the feature.

Frances Bergen's first appearance came at the hotel's Corinthian Room.

The hotel was sold in February 1972 for $2.3 million to Dallas company Continental Firms. Continental would sell to Vita Trading Co. in 1973.

The hotel closed in May 1973. While the hotel had been built to survive another fire, the new fire code would have required the building to retrofit a sprinkler system which was deemed to be cost-prohibitive. Drawings for a new $20 million, 18-story Rodeway-branded hotel on the site were drawn up.

The front five stories of the hotel was partially imploded on August 12, 1973, with the remaining twelve story rear part of the building coming down in late September. The second Adams was the first building in Arizona to be imploded.

== Current hotel (1975–) ==
The new hotel opened in April 1975 and was initially known as the Adams Hotel. With 538 rooms, it was the largest hotel in Arizona at the time of opening. The new hotel initially struggled and Vita Corporation, the owners, filed for bankruptcy in 1976. In 1981, the hotel was first bought out of bankruptcy by a Prudential Insurance company subsidiary and subsequently became a member of the Hilton brand. The hotel was renamed the Adams Hilton.

The hotel, known in the 1980s as the New Adams Hilton and the Phoenix Hilton, became the Phoenix Sheraton hotel sometime during early 1988. In 1991 it became the Omni Adams, and then became the Holiday Inn Crowne Plaza in 1993. It is now called the Renaissance Phoenix Downtown Hotel.
