= Pat Adams (disambiguation) =

Pat Adams (born 1928) is an American painter and printer.

Pat Adams may also refer to:

- Pat Adams (cycle race organiser), British organiser of cycling events

== See also ==
- Patrick Adams (disambiguation)
- Patricia Adams (disambiguation)
