= Tony Adams (disambiguation) =

Tony Adams (born 1966) is an English football player and manager.

Tony or Toni Adams may also refer to:

- "Tony Adams", song by Joe Strummer tribute to the footballer, from Rock Art and the X-Ray Style
- Tony Adams (actor) (1940–2025), Welsh actor
- Tony Adams (quarterback) (born 1950), American and Canadian football quarterback
- Tony Adams (safety) (born 1999), American football safety
- Tony Adams (producer) (1953–2005), Irish film and stage producer
- Toni Adams (1964–2010), American female professional wrestler

== See also ==
- Anthony Adams (disambiguation)
- Adams (surname)
