= Albert Adams =

Albert Adams may refer to:

- Albert J. Adams (1845–1906), American racketeer
- James Adams (bishop of Barking) (Albert James Adams, 1915–1999), Anglican bishop

== See also ==
- Bert Adams (disambiguation)
