= Marcus Adams =

Marcus Adams may refer to:

- Marcus Adams (director), British film director
- Marcus Adams (photographer) (1875–1959), British society photographer
- Marcus Adams (Canadian football) (born 1979), Canadian football defensive tackle
- Marcus Adams (footballer) (born 1993), Australian Football League defender

== See also ==
- Marcus Adam (born 1968), English athlete
- Mark Adams (disambiguation)
