= Stephen Adam =

Stephen Adam may refer to:

- Stephen Adam (MP) (died 1405), English politician
- Stephen Adam (stained glass designer) (1848–1910), Scottish stained glass designer
- Sir Stephen Timothy Forbes Adam, 4th Baronet (1923–2019)

== See also ==
- Stephen Adams (disambiguation)
