= Patrick Adams =

Patrick Adams may refer to:

- Patrick Adams (musician) (1950–2022), American musician and producer
- Patrick "Patsy" Adams, member of the Clerkenwell crime syndicate
- Patrick J. Adams (born 1981), Canadian actor
- Patrick Adams (River City), fictional character

== See also ==
- Pat Adams (disambiguation)
- Adams (surname)
