= Patricia Adams =

Patricia Adams may refer to:

- Patricia J. Adams (born 1952), Anguillan writer
- Patricia Emily Adams, South African politician
- Pat Adams (born 1928), American painter and printmaker

== See also ==
- Pat Adams (disambiguation)
