= Daniel Adams =

Daniel Adams may refer to:

- Daniel Adams (physician) (1773–1864), American physician, legislator, and author
- Daniel Weisiger Adams (1821–1872), brigadier general in the Confederate Army
- Dan Adams (1887–1964), Major League Baseball pitcher
- Dan Adams (American football) (born 1984), American football linebacker
- Daniel Adams (novelist) (1930–2017), pseudonym of British novelist Christopher Robin Nicole
- Daniel Adams (director) (born 1961), American director of the film Primary Motive
- Danny Adams (born 1976), English footballer
- Doc Adams (1814–1899), baseball player and executive

== See also ==
- Danielle Adams (born 1989), American basketball player
- Adams (surname)
