= Neil Adams =

Neil Adams may refer to:

- Neil Adams (judoka) (born 1958), British judoka
- Neil Adams (footballer) (born 1965), English footballer
- Neil Adams (ice hockey) (born 1982), English ice hockey player
- Neil Adams (rugby union) (1923–1986), Australian rugby union player

== See also ==
- Neal Adams (1941–2022), American comic book artist
- O'Neal Adams (1919–1998), American football and basketball player
- Neil Adam (disambiguation)
- Adams (surname)
