= Craig Adams =

Craig Adams may refer to:

- Craig Adams (musician) (born 1962), British musician
- Craig Adams (ice hockey) (born 1977), Canadian ice hockey player in the National Hockey League
- Craig Adams (footballer) (born 1974), English footballer
- DJ Assault (born Craig De Shan Adams, 1977), American rapper

== See also ==
- Adams (surname)
