= Ted Adams =

Ted Adams may refer to:

- Ted Adams (actor) (1890–1973), American film actor
- Ted Adams (footballer) (1906–1991), English professional footballer who played as a goalkeeper
- Ted Adams (cricketer) (1896–1977), Australian cricketer
- Ted Adams (publisher), American comic publisher

== See also ==
- Edward Adams (disambiguation)
- Theodore Samuel Adams (1885–1961), British colonial civil servant
