= Keith Adams =

Keith Adams may refer to:

- Keith Adams (American football) (born 1979), American football player
- Keith Adams (cricketer) (1932–2018), English cricketer
- Keith Adams (filmmaker) (1926–2012), Australian adventurer and filmmaker
- Keith Adams (weightlifter) (born 1950), Canadian weightlifter
- Keith John Adams, British singer/songwriter

== See also ==
- Adams (surname)
