= Terry Adams =

Terry Adams may refer to:

- Terry Adams (baseball) (born 1973), former Major League Baseball pitcher
- Terry Adams (BMX rider) (born 1983), professional flatland BMX rider
- Terry Adams (musician) (born 1948), American pianist/composer
- Terry Adams (rugby league) (fl. 1973–1979), Australian professional rugby league footballer
- Terry Adams, Irish/British criminal connected to the Clerkenwell crime syndicate

== See also ==
- Adams (surname)
- Terry v. Adams, 1953 United States Supreme Court decision
