= Neil Adam =

Neil Adam may refer to:

- Neil Kensington Adam (1891–1973), British chemist
- Neil Adam (racehorse trainer) (1932–2003), British racehorse trainer
- Neil Adam, musician in the band Silly Wizard

== See also ==
- Neil Adams (disambiguation)
