= The Albury Banner and Wodonga Express =

Australian newspaper published in Albury, New South Wales from 1939 to 1949

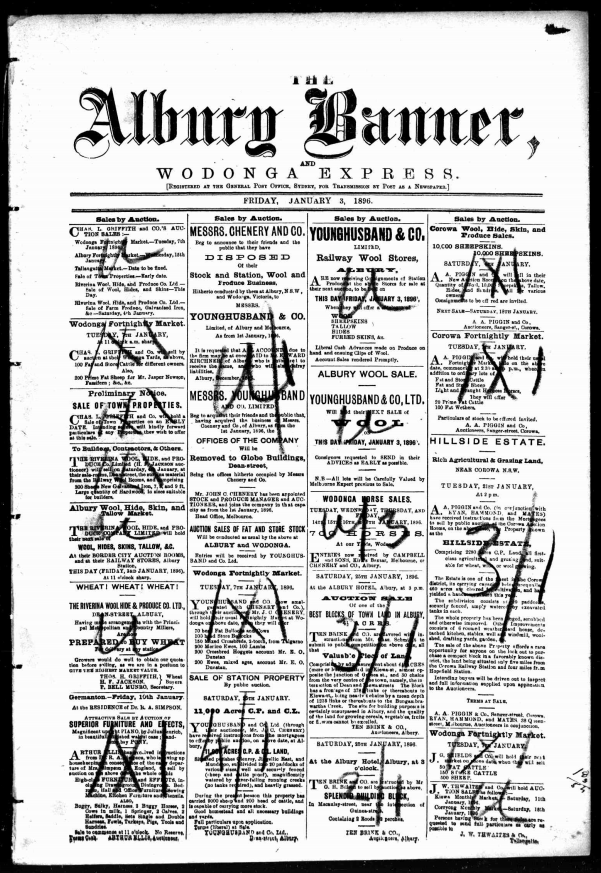
The Albury Banner and Wodonga Express, 3 January 1896

The Albury Banner and Wodonga Express was a weekly English language newspaper published in Albury, New South Wales, Australia.

== History ==
The Albury Banner, according to the National Library's Trove, was up and running by 7 July 1860, although reported elsewhere as 3 January 1896. First printed and published on 3 January 1896 by George Adams for the proprietors of the Albury Banner and Wodonga Express. It was published from 1896 to 1939. The paper became known as "The Cocky's Bible" because Adams advocated the cause of free settlers. From 1939 to 1949 it was published as The Albury Banner, Wodonga Express and Riverina Stock Journal and as the Albury Banner from 1949 to 1950.

== Digitisation ==
The paper has been digitised as part of the Australian Newspapers Digitisation Program of the National Library of Australia.

== See also ==
- List of newspapers in Australia
- List of newspapers in New South Wales
