= Anthony Adams (disambiguation) =

Anthony Adams (born 1980) is a former American football player.

Anthony Adams may also refer to:

- Anthony Adams (California politician) (born 1971), former California State Assemblyman
- Anthony Adams (Michigan politician), former deputy-mayor of Detroit
- Anthony Adams (optometrist) (1940–2021), Australian-American optometrist
- Anthony Irvine Adams (1936–2025), Australian public health physician
- Tony Adams (actor) (Anthony S. Adams, 1940–2025), British actor

== See also ==
- Tony Adams (disambiguation)
- Antoine Adams (born 1988), St.Kitts and Nevis track and field runner
