= Walter Adams =

Walter Adams may refer to:

== People ==
- Walter Adams (economist) (1922–1998), American university professor and president
- Walter Adams (bishop) (1877–1957), Canadian religious leader who served as the Anglican Archbishop of British Columbia
- Walter Sydney Adams (1876–1956), American astronomer
- Walter Adams (runner) (1945–2023), German runner
- Sir Walter Adams (historian) (1906–1975), economist, principal of the University College of Rhodesia and director of the London School of Economics
- Walter Adams (footballer), English professional footballer
- Walter Adams (politician) (1830–1892), Australian businessman, sugar planter and politician
- Walter Adams (wrestler) (1887–1939), British wrestler

== Fictional ==
- Walter Adams, character in Alice Adams (film)

== Ships ==
- USS Walter Adams, a US Navy patrol vessel in commission from 1918 to 1919

== See also ==
- Walter Adams Coxen (1870–1949), Australian Army major general in World War I
- Adams (surname)
