= Chris Adams =

Chris Adams may refer to:

== Sports ==
- Chris Adams (footballer) (1927–2012), English footballer
- Chris Adams (wrestler) (1955–2001), English judoka and professional wrestler
- Chris Adams (cricketer) (born 1970), English cricketer
- Chris Adams (rugby league) (born 1986), Australian rugby league footballer

== Music ==
- Chris Adams (Scottish musician) (1944–2016), of the Scottish folk band String Driven Thing
- Chris Adams (UK musician), of the UK post-rock band Hood
- Chris "Cid" Adams, American bassist, former member of the heavy metal band Byzantine
- Chris Adams (American drummer), former drummer with the punk band Riverboat Gamblers
- Badvoid (born Christopher Adams, 2000), British music producer and DJ

== Politics ==
- Christopher R. Adams, member of the New Hampshire House of Representatives
- Christopher T. Adams (born 1972), member of the Maryland House of Delegates

== Other ==
- Chris Adams (general) (born 1930), American author and Air Force officer
- Chris Adams (character), The Magnificent Seven leader
- Christopher Adams (scientist), African American scientist, and biotechnology CEO

== See also ==
- Adams (surname)
- Christine Adams (disambiguation)
