= Wilson Fairweather =

Scottish footballer

Personal information
- Full name: John Wilson Fairweather
- Date of birth: 12 August 1924
- Place of birth: Dornoch, Scotland
- Date of death: December 1989 (aged 65)
- Place of death: Bath, England
- Position: Right-half

Youth career
- Queen of the South

Senior career*
Years	Team	Apps	(Gls)
–1944	Annan Athletic		
1944–1947	Blackburn Rovers	0	(0)
1947–1948	Cowdenbeath	10	(0)
1948–1950	Carlisle United	1	(0)
1950–1953	Bath City		

Managerial career
- 1953–1956: Frome Town
- * Club domestic league appearances and goals

John Wilson Fairweather (12 August 1924 – December 1989) was a Scottish footballer who played as a right-half.

Fairweather, known as Jock, played for Queen of the South and Annan Athletic before joining English club Blackburn Rovers in April 1944. He moved to Cowdenbeath in 1947 and made 10 appearances. He then returned to England in November 1948 to join Carlisle United, where he made a single Football League appearance.

He was enlisted by Bath City for the 1950–51 season, joining fellow new recruits Trevor Jones, Tommy Edwards, and George Adams, and spent three seasons with the club.

Fairweather went on to manage Frome Town and led the club to an FA Cup first-round game against Leyton Orient in 1954. He returned to Bath City as reserve team coach in July 1956.
