= Samuel Adams (disambiguation) =

Samuel Adams (1722–1803) was a Founding Father of the United States and a Boston leader in the era of the American Revolution.

Samuel Adams or Sam Adams may also refer to:

== Politics ==
- Samuel Adams (Arkansas politician) (1805–1850), acting Governor of Arkansas in 1844
- Sam Adams (Oregon politician) (born 1963), mayor of Portland, Oregon
- Samuel Hunter Adams (1878–1975), mayor of Calgary, Alberta, Canada

== Military and intelligence ==
- Samuel Adams (Loyalist) (1730–1810), Loyalist officer in the Revolutionary War, physician, surgeon
- Samuel Adams (naval officer) (1912–1942), United States naval officer
- Samuel A. Adams (1934–1988), CIA analyst known for challenging official enemy troop estimates during the Vietnam War

== Sports ==
- Sam Adams (golfer) (born 1946), PGA Tour golfer
- Sam Adams Sr. (1948–2015), American football player
- Sam Adams (American football) (born 1973), American football player
- Sam Adams (Canadian football) (1928–2015), Canadian football player
- Sam Adams (footballer, born 1989), Ghanaian footballer

== Other people ==
- Samuel Adams Sr. (1689–1748), American brewer
- Soren Sorensen Adams or Sam Adams (1879–1963), Danish-born American inventor of the joy buzzer and other novelties
- Sam Adams (explorer) (1828–1915), surveyor of the American West
- Samuel S. Adams (1937–2006), economic geologist
- Samuel Hopkins Adams (1871–1958), American writer and investigative journalist
- Samuel Adams (composer) (born 1985), American composer
- Sammy Adams (born 1987), American rapper
- Samuel Adams (priest) (1886–1856), Irish Anglican priest and Dean of Cashel
- Samuel B. Adams (1853–1938), Supreme Court of Georgia judge
- Samuel Hoppus Adams (1835–1895), British surgeon, physician and botanist

== Other uses ==
- Samuel Adams (beer), an American brand of beer
- Sam Adams Alliance
- Sam Adams Award

== See also ==
- Adams (surname)
