= Tommy Edwards (footballer) =

Welsh association football player

Personal information
- Full name: Walter Thomas Edwards
- Date of birth: 11 February 1923
- Place of birth: Llanelli, Wales
- Date of death: October 2000 (aged 77)
- Place of death: Lambeth, England
- Position: Left winger

Senior career*
Years	Team	Apps	(Gls)
–1946	Workington		
1946–1948	Fulham	2	(0)
1948	Southend United	12	(1)
1948–?	Leicester City	3	(1)
1950–1952	Bath City		
1952–1953	Walsall	12	(0)
1953–?	Oswestry		
- * Club domestic league appearances and goals

Walter Thomas Edwards (11 March 1923 – October 2000) was a Welsh footballer who played as a left winger in the Football League for Fulham, Southend United, Leicester City and Walsall.

Edwards joined Fulham from Workington in August 1946. He joined Southend United for £2,000 in March 1948, then moved to Leicester City in December of that year for £3,500. After a period playing in the north of England, he moved to Bath City for the 1950–51 season, joining fellow new recruits Trevor Jones, Wilson Fairweather and George Adams. He joined Walsall in May 1952, then moved to Oswestry in July 1953.
