= Colin Adams =

Colin Adams is the name of:

- Colin Adams (executive), British television executive
- Colin Adams (mathematician) (born 1956), American mathematician and author

== See also ==
- Adams (surname)
