= Trevor Jones (Welsh footballer) =

Welsh footballer

Personal information
- Date of birth: 27 January 1923
- Place of birth: Aberdare, Wales
- Date of death: March 1983 (aged 60)
- Place of death: Merthyr Tydfil, Wales
- Position: Winger

Senior career*
Years	Team	Apps	(Gls)
–1948	Aberaman		
1948–1949	Plymouth Argyle	0	(0)
1949–1950	Watford	15	(2)
1950–?	Bath City		
- * Club domestic league appearances and goals

Trevor Jones (27 January 1923 – March 1983) was a Welsh footballer who played as a winger in the Football League for Watford.

Jones played for Aberaman and had trials at Cardiff City and Norwich City before moving to Plymouth Argyle as an amateur during the 1947–48 season. He signed as a professional in May 1948, but moved on to Watford without appearing in the League.

Jones joined Watford in August 1949. He made 16 appearances, scoring three goals, during the 1947–48 season, including a goal in Watford's FA Cup win against amateur club Bromley on 26 November 1949. He was released at the end of the season.

He moved to Bath City for the 1950–51 season, where he joined fellow new recruits Tommy Edwards, Wilson Fairweather and George Adams. A local paper commented that "although signed as an outside right, he is a useful centre-forward".
