= Mark Adams =

Mark Adams may refer to:

- Mark Adams (artist) (1925–2006), American artist
- Mark Adams (photographer) (born 1949), New Zealand photographer
- Mark Adams (designer) (born 1961), English car designer
- Mark Adams (metal musician) (1958–2023), American metal bassist
- Mark Adams (funk musician), funk band Slave bassist
- Mark Adams (basketball, born May 1956), college basketball coach, former head coach of Texas Tech
- Mark Adams (basketball, born June 1956), college basketball analyst and former head coach of Central Connecticut
- Mark Adams, executive director of the Welsh Chess Union

== See also ==
- Marcus Adams (disambiguation)
- Adams (surname)
