= Michael Adams =

Michael Adams may refer to:

== Academia ==
- Michael Friedrich Adams, alternate name of Johann Friedrich Adam (1780–1838), Russian botanist
- Michael F. Adams (1948–2026), former president of the University of Georgia
- J. Michael Adams (1947–2012), president of Fairleigh Dickinson University

== Arts and entertainment ==
- Michael Adams (journalist) (1920–2005), who worked for the BBC
- Michael Adams (stunt performer) (1950–2010), actor, stunt performer and stunt coordinator
- Michael Adams (presenter) (born 1999), British television personality

== Politics ==
- Michael Adams (Canadian politician) (1845–1899), Canadian politician
- Michael Adams (Kentucky politician) (born 1976), secretary of state of Kentucky
- Michael Adams (Wisconsin politician) (1831–1903), American businessman and politician

== Sports ==
- Michael Adams (basketball) (born 1963), American basketball player
- Michael Adams (chess player) (born 1971), English chess grandmaster
- Michael Adams (American football) (born 1985), American football cornerback
- Mick Adams (1951–2017), rugby league player
- Micky Adams (born 1961), English former professional footballer and football coach

== Other people ==
- Michael J. Adams (1930–1967), American test pilot and astronaut
- Michael Adams, co-founder of the Canadian polling firm Environics
- Michael Adams (RAF officer) (1934–2022), British Royal Air Force officer
- Michael Adams (lawyer) (born 1961), American attorney and LGBT+ civil rights advocate
- Michael Adams (comics), fictional character from DC Comics

== See also ==
- Mike Adams (disambiguation)
- Adams (surname)
