= Herbert Adams =

Herbert Adams may refer to:

- Herbert Baxter Adams (1850–1901), American educator and historian
- Herbert Adams (carmaker), maker of the Adams-Farwell automobile 1893–1912
- Herbert Adams (novelist) (1874–1958), English writer
- Herbert Adams (sculptor) (1858–1945), American sculptor
- Herbert Jordan Adams (1838–1912), English entomologist
- Herb Adams (baseball) (1928–2012), American baseball player
- Herb Adams (politician) (born c. 1955), American politician and historian in Maine
- Herbert C. Adams (1873–1955), British philatelist

== See also ==
- Bert Adams (disambiguation)
- Adams (surname)
