= Paul Adam =

Paul Adam may refer to:

- Paul Adam (French novelist) (1862–1920)
- Paul Adam (German soldier) (1892–1969)
- Paul Adam (English novelist) (born 1958), English journalist and novelist
- Paul Adam (music) (born 1964), British songwriter
- Jean-Pierre-Paul Adam, French actor

== See also ==
- Paul Adams (disambiguation)
