= Carl S. Adams =

American politician

Member of the New Hampshire House of Representatives from the Grafton 13th district
- In office 1986–1992

Member of the New Hampshire House of Representatives from the Grafton 14th district
- In office 1992–1996

Personal details
- Born: Carl Stevens Adams; August 16, 1917 Lebanon, New Hampshire, U.S.
- Died: April 20, 2019 (aged 101) Lebanon, New Hampshire, U.S.
- Party: Republican

Carl Stevens Adams (August 16, 1917 – April 20, 2019) was an American politician. A member of the Republican Party, he served in the New Hampshire House of Representatives from 1986 to 1996.

== Life and career ==
Adams was born in Lebanon, New Hampshire, the son of Arthur Adams and Clara Gates. He attended Lebanon High School, graduating in 1935. After graduating, he attended Dartmouth College, but his education was interrupted by military service during World War II, which after his discharge, he worked as a farmer.

Adams served in the New Hampshire House of Representatives from 1986 to 1996.

== Death ==
Adams died on April 20, 2019, in Lebanon, New Hampshire, at the age of 101.
