= Artie Adams =

Australian rules footballer (1891–1969)

Personal information
- Full name: Arthur Henry Adams
- Born: 4 September 1891; South Melbourne, Victoria
- Died: 12 July 1969 (aged 77); Coburg, Victoria
- Original team: Williamstown

Playing career^{1}
Years	Club	Games (Goals)
1915	South Melbourne	3 (0)
- ^{1} Playing statistics correct to the end of 1915.

Arthur Henry Adams (4 September 1891 – 12 July 1969) was an Australian rules footballer who played for the South Melbourne Football Club in the Victorian Football League (VFL).
