= Stephen Adams =

Stephen or Steven Adams may refer to:

- Stephen Adams (composer) or Michael Maybrick (1841–1913), English composer
- Stephen Adams (business) (1937–2024), American businessman and private equity investor
- Stephen Adams (cricketer) (born 1953), New Zealand cricketer
- Stephen Adams (footballer) (born 1989), Ghanaian footballer
- Stephen Adams (politician) (1807–1857), U.S. Representative and Senator from Mississippi
- Steven Adams (born 1993), New Zealand basketball player
- Steven Adams (musician), British musician

== See also ==
- Steve Adams (disambiguation)
- Stephen Adam (disambiguation)
