= George Adams (footballer, born 1947) =

English footballer

Personal information
- Full name: George Robert Adams
- Date of birth: 28 September 1947 (age 79)
- Place of birth: Shoreditch, England
- Position: Midfielder

Senior career*
Years	Team	Apps	(Gls)
1965–1966	Chelsea	0	(0)
1966–1968	Peterborough United	16	(2)
- * Club domestic league appearances and goals

George Robert Adams (born 28 September 1947) is an English former professional footballer who played in the Football League as a midfielder.
