= Steve Adams =

Steve Adams may refer to:

== Sportsmen ==
- Steve Adams (footballer, born 1958), English footballer
- Steve Adams (footballer, born 1959) (1959–2017), English footballer
- Steve Adams (footballer, born 1980), English footballer

== Musicians ==
- Steve Adams (musician) (born 1975), American bassist and co-founder of Animal Liberation Orchestra
- Cat Stevens (born 1948), singer who used the stage name Steve Adams

== Other uses ==
- Steve Adams (actor), Australian actor
- Steve Adams (politician) (born 1951), Tennessee State Treasurer from 1987 to 2003
- Steve Adams (writer) (born 1947), American screenwriter
- Steve Adams (Western Federation of Miners), played minor but important role in events surrounding the murder trial of Harry Orchard
- Steve Adams, co-founder of Steamy Window Productions, a Canadian production house in partnership with Sean Horlor

== See also ==
- Stephen Adams (disambiguation)
