= Amanda Adams =

American author, archaeologist, and former fashion model

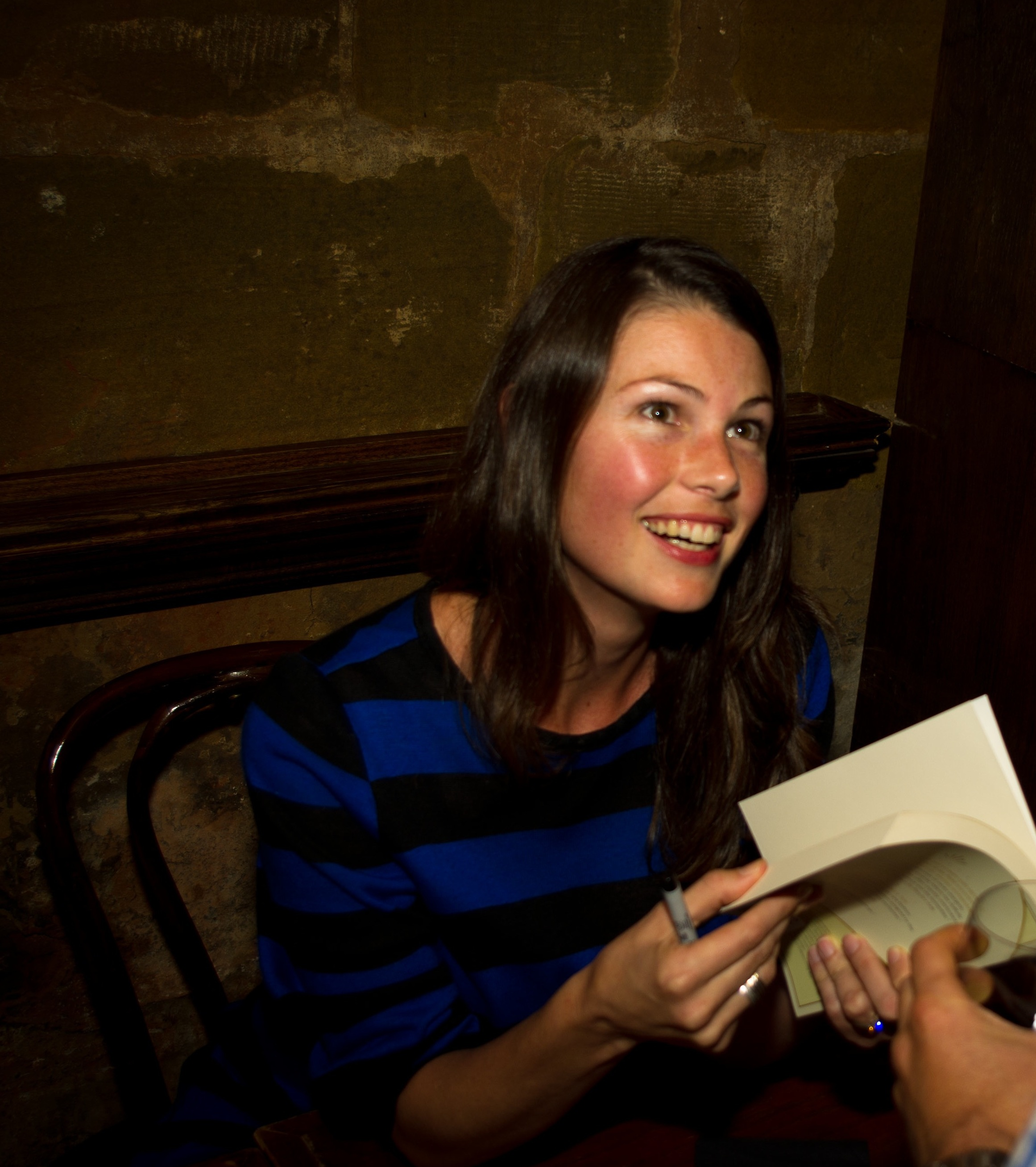
- Adams during a book signing event, 2010
- Education: University of California, Berkeley, University of British Columbia
- Scientific career
- Fields: Archaeology
- Thesis: Visions Cast on Stone

Amanda Adams is an American author and archaeologist. She is also a former fashion model and was featured in the 1996 Buffalo Jeans campaign.

== Biography ==
She attended University of California, Berkeley, Department of Anthropology in the late 1990s and completed her degree with the Kroeber prize. She then obtained a master's degree in archaeology from the University of British Columbia, Vancouver. Her thesis was titled Visions Cast on Stone, abstracts were published in the journal The Midden.

Adams's first book. A Mermaid's Tale, was about the mermaid legends from around the world. It received a starred review in Booklist. Her second book, Ladies of the Field, details the adventurous lives of early, female archaeologists.

== Publications ==
- Adams, Amanda (2006), A mermaid's tale: a personal search for love and lore, Greystone Books, ISBN 978-1-55365-117-8
- Adams, Amanda (2010), Ladies of the Field: Early Women Archaeologists and Their Search for Adventure, Douglas & McIntyre, ISBN 978-1-55365-433-9
