= Bernard Adams =

Bernard Adams may refer to:

- Bernard Adams (bishop) (1566–1626), Anglican bishop in Ireland
- Bernard Adams (writer) (1890–1917), British military officer and writer
- Bernard S. Adams (1928–2017), American academic
