= Teresa Adams =

American suffragist and civil rights activist (1869–1947)

- Born: c. 1869; Keokuk, Iowa, United States
- Died: 1947; Manteno, Illinois, United States
- Occupations: Activist; suffragist

Teresa Adams (c. 1869 –1947) was an American civil rights activist and suffragist. Adams was involved in women's clubs and civil rights organizations in Davenport, Iowa, and frequently travelled across the state to advocate women's rights and suffrage.

== Biography ==
Adams, a Black woman, was born in Keokuk, Iowa, around 1869, to parents Thomas and Mary Ann Adams, originally from Kentucky. Adams moved with her sister to Davenport, Iowa, in October 1895.

In Davenport, she joined civil rights organizations and women's clubs, including the Toussaint L'Ouverture Club, which she was elected registrar for in 1916.. She was associated with the city's Bethel AME Church. She was also involved in the Davenport chapter of the National Association for the Advancement of Colored People (NAACP), chairing its education committee. In the 1910s, Adams became a board member of the Iowa Association of Colored Women’s Clubs (IACWC), later known as the Iowa Federation of Colored Women’s Clubs (IFCWC). In 1912, she was a founding member of a girl's improvement club in Davenport, serving on the board of directors. In 1914, when the IFCWC established a standing suffrage committee, Adams became its leader. She travelled throughout Iowa to give speeches on behalf of the committee. In 1919, the Iowa General Assembly passed a presidential suffrage bill, three months prior to the state's ratification of the Nineteenth Amendment to the United States Constitution, which was officially ratified in 1920.

Sometime after 1920, Adams moved to Chicago. Adams died in Manteno, Illinois, in 1947.
