= Lawrence Adams (Mississippi politician) =

American lawyer and politician

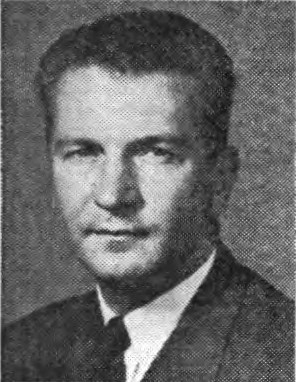
- c. 1949

Member of the Mississippi State Senate from the 9th district
- In office January 1948 – January 1960
- Preceded by: L. A. Whittington
- Succeeded by: Marion W. Smith

Personal details
- Born: December 10, 1914 Natchez, Mississippi, U.S.
- Died: July 18, 1994 (aged 79) Natchez, Mississippi, U.S.
- Party: Democratic

George Lawrence Adams (December 10, 1914 - July 18, 1994) was an American lawyer and Democrat politician. He represented Adams County in the Mississippi State Senate from 1948 to 1960.

== Early life ==
George Lawrence Adams was born December 10, 1914, in Natchez, Mississippi. He graduated from Natchez High School. He then graduated from the University of Mississippi with a L.L.B. degree. In 1937, he started practicing law in Natchez. During World War II, Adams served in the Infantry branch of the United States Army and held the rank of Major when he was discharged. He also served on the Board of Trustees of Jefferson Military College.

== Political career ==
=== 1947-1951 ===
In 1947, Adams was elected to represent the 9th District (Adams County) in the Mississippi State Senate for the 1948–1952 term. During this term, Adams the chairman of the Senate's Interstate Cooperation Committee and the vice-chairman of the Municipalities Committee and the Local & Private Affairs Committee. He also served on several other committees: Conservation of Natural Resources; Finance (Recurring Appropriations); Judiciary; Registrations & Elections; and Military Affairs.

=== 1951-1955 ===
In 1951, Adams was re-elected to represent the 9th District for the 1952–1956 term. During this term, Adams was the chairman of the Senate's Insurance Committee. He also served on the following committees: Conservation of Natural Resources; Finance (Recurring Appropriations); Drainage; Interstate Cooperation; Judiciary; Juvenile Delinquency and Child Welfare; Local & Private Legislation; and Municipalities.

=== 1955-1960 ===
In 1955, Adams was re-elected from the same district for a third term spanning from 1956 to 1960. During this term, Adams was the chairman of both the Insurance and the Interstate & Federal Cooperation Committees. Adams was also a member of the following committees: Aviation; Commerce & Manufacturing; Finance; Judiciary; Municipalities; Oil & Gas; and the powerful Rules Committee.

Adams's Senate tenure ended in 1960 and was succeeded in the 9th District by Marion W. Smith. In 1961, Adams was elected to serve on the Board of Directors of Mississippi Power & Light. Adams died of a heart attack at 11 AM on July 18, 1994, in Natchez, Mississippi.

== Personal life ==
Adams was a member of the Presbyterian Church. He was a member of the Phi Delta Theta fraternity. He was married to Kate Don Brandon, and they had two sons and two daughters.
