= Stanley Adams =

Stanley Adams may refer to:

- Stanley Adams (actor) (1915–1977), American actor and screenwriter
- Stanley Adams (singer) (1907–1994), American singer and lyricist
- Stanley Adams (whistleblower) (born c. 1927), Swiss pharmaceutical company executive and corporate whistleblower
- Stanley T. Adams (1922–1999), American Army officer, recipient of the Medal of Honor during the Korean War
- Stanley Theodore Adams (born 1966), American serial killer
- Stan Adams (born 1960), American football player
