= J. C. Adams Stone Barn =

- U.S. National Register of Historic Places
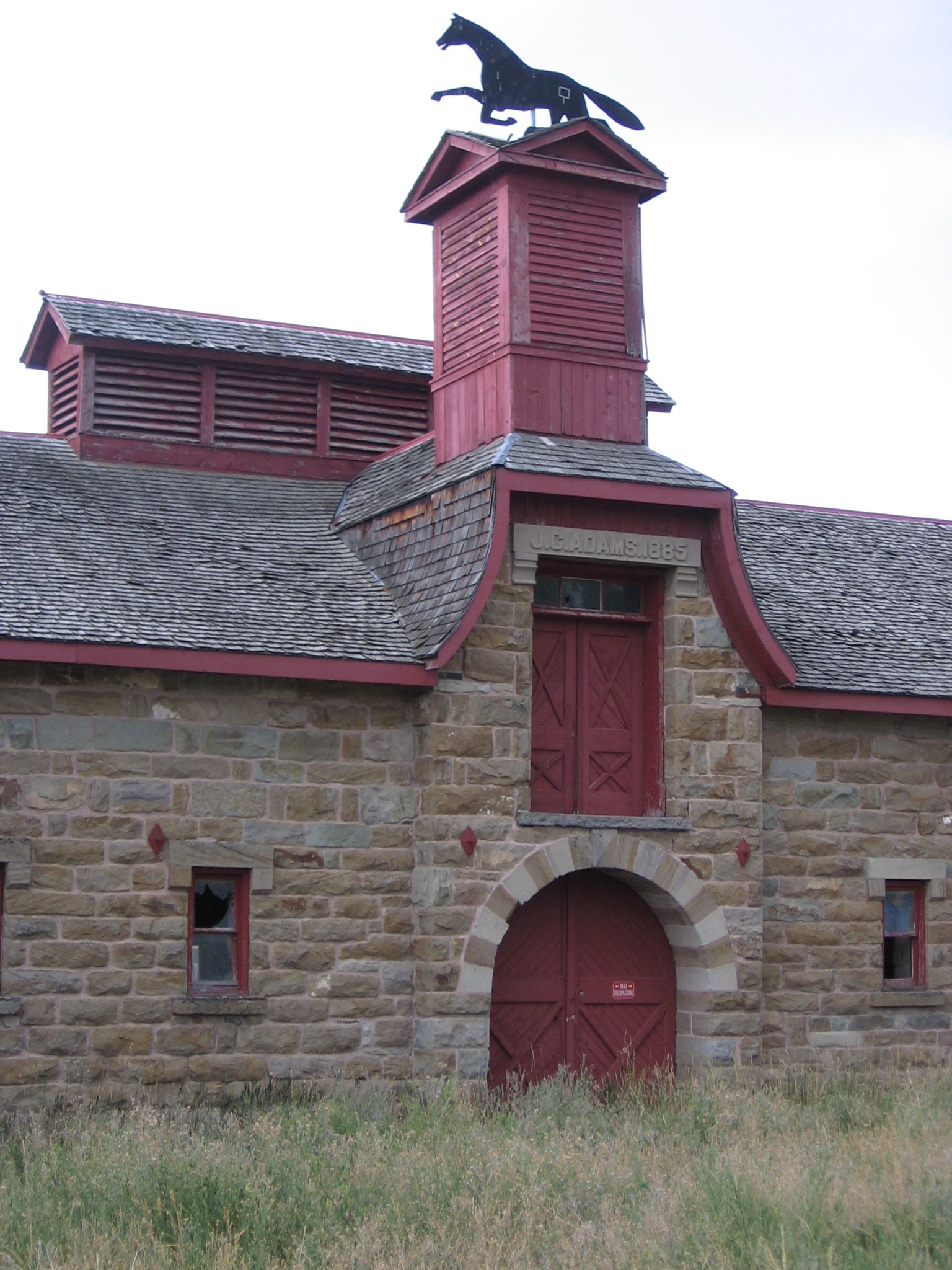
- Front entrance to Adam's Stone Barn
- Location: Northeast of Sun River, Montana, off U.S. Route 89
- Coordinates: 47.540278°N 111.686389°W
- Built: 1885
- NRHP reference No.: 79001399

The J. C. Adams Stone Barn is a historic Romanesque Revival barn constructed of stone and wood located about 1 mile (1.6 km) northeast of the town of Sun River, Montana, in the United States. It is just south of U.S. Route 89. It is the only Romanesque Revival stone barn in the United States located west of the Mississippi River. Chere Jiusto, Christine Brown, and Tom Ferris of the Montana Historical Society have described the Adams Stone Barn as "one of Montana's most-beloved and best-known landmark barns." The structure was added to the National Register of Historic Places on January 12, 1979.

== History of the barn ==
=== J.C. Adams and construction of the barn ===
James Calvin Adams was born in Morgan County, Kentucky, on December 11, 1846 to Lott William and Rebecca May Adams. He spent his childhood working on his family's farm. He was the third of eight children, and the oldest boy. His mother died in 1856 at the age of 32. His father died in Bates County, Missouri, in 1861 at the age of 44, leaving Adams orphaned. After being imprisoned at the age of 16 during the American Civil War, he was released and settled in the Montana Territory in 1863 (traveling up the Missouri River by steamboat). He spent several years working for the Diamond R. Wagon Co. hauling supplies from Fort Benton to Walla Walla via the Mullan Road. In December 1874, he moved to Sun River, Montana, where he established the Sun River Ranch. He raised cattle, horses, and sheep, which he sold to the United States Army at nearby Fort Shaw. He opened stores in Sun River and in Augusta, Montana, and by 1882 was one of the wealthiest landowners in the area.

Adams began construction of the stone barn in 1882. He hired two Swedish immigrant stonemasons to help construct it. William Bruce, a Canadian immigrant, was hired as the construction foreman. He spent more than $10,000 on the structure, which was considered an extremely lavish amount at the time. The single-piece stone arches for the barn were imported from St. Louis, Missouri, and shipped by steamboat to nearby Fort Benton. When completed after nearly three years, the nearby Sun River Press newspaper called it the "Marvel of Montana." To celebrate the barn's completion, Adams held a roller skating party on the barn's second floor.

The main section of the barn was used by Adams to house cattle. The west wing contained several horse stalls, and was also used to house the horse tack. The east wing was used as a garage for storing wagons, and contained a cooled room for holding dressed meat. The second floor was used to store hay. But dances were also held there, and it sometimes functioned as housing for passengers on the local stagecoach route. Two of Adams' workers, Robert Swain and Samuel Gilmour, founded Gilmour and Swain's Buggy and Carriage Repair and Corrective Shoeing in the barn in 1885. (The business still existed as of 2012 as Swains Spring Service.)

Fort Shaw closed in 1890. But until then, the fort's soldiers often held roller skating parties as well as formal functions in the barn's second floor. The barn's large meat locker also often stored meat for the fort.

=== 20th century ownership changes ===
Adams died in 1913. His widow, who had nine children to support, was unable to pay the taxes on the farm. Fred A. Woehner, owner of the Great Falls Drug Co. (a small chain of pharmacies in the area), acquired the ranch in a tax sale in 1920 and used it as a home. Woehner died, and in 1939 C.A. Christensen (whose family owned a ranch next to the Adams property) purchased the ranch from his estate. The Christensen family used the barn to house cattle for their dairy. The Christensen family sold the ranch to Great Falls lumber yard and hardware store owner Harold Poulsen in 1973.

The same year that Poulsen bought the old Adams ranch and its stone barn, Mike and Teresa Stuckslager began researching the history of the barn. Mike Stuckslager was a former graphic and advertising design artist for the Chicago Tribune newspaper who quit to be the editor of two historic gun-collecting magazines. Teresa Stuckslager was a writer of commercials for radio and television. The Stuckslagers moved to Montana in early 1973, and quickly discovered the Adams Stone Barn. Over the next six years, the Stuckslagers researched the history of the barn, documented the genealogy of the Adams family, and established the historic nature of the structure.

By 1979, the stone barn was in poor condition. The sandstone front wall was leaning forward by about 2 feet (0.61 m), most of the windows lacked glass, and the life-size horse weathervane had lost its ears and tail to lightning. The roof was collapsing, most of the shingles were gone, and the ventilators had collapsed. The local newspaper, the Great Falls Tribune, said the structure was close to "near-certain collapse".

Stuckslager nominated the barn for placement on the National Register of Historic Places, to which it was added in 1979. The Stuckslagers approached Poulsen about restoration efforts. Poulsen agreed the barn needed conserving, and that same year established a nonprofit organization, the Dracut Junction Stone Barn Co., to take ownership of the barn and the immediate land it stood on. (The nonprofit was named after a town that J.C. Adams planned to found near his ranch, but never did.) Poulsen received a $79,000 tax credit for donating the barn to the nonprofit.

=== Dracut Junction Stone Barn Co. and the restoration of the barn ===
Ownership of the Adams Stone Barn by Dracut Junction Stone Barn Co. made the structure eligible for preservation grants from the United States Department of the Interior. The nonprofit received a $79,000 preservation grant in 1980 that greatly improved its structural integrity. The roof was restored, new glass windows installed, and the second floor reinforced to prevent its collapse. The front sandstone wall was set upright, and all the walls strengthened against collapse. Much of the preservation work was performed by local volunteers. Another $31,000 was raised locally to finish the restoration work in 1981. The rededication of the Adams Stone Barn in August 1981 was attended by Montana Governor Ted Schwinden and Alma Adams Morgan, the 101-year-old surviving child of J.C. Adams.

At some point between 1981 and 2002, Stuckslager installed an underground electrical power line that allowed the barn to have electric lighting and power. But no electric wiring inside the barn was installed, and the power never turned on.

=== Sun River Valley Historical Society ownership ===
In 2004, the board of directors of the Dracut Junction Stone Barn Co. voted to dissolve and sell the Adams Stone Barn. Teresa Osborne Stuckslager died in October 1994, and Mike Stuckslager married Jennifer Elaine Bobo in 1996. Mike Stuckslager died of heart disease in May 2003. Jennifer Stuckslager later remarried and had two children. Jennifer Stuckslager Stetson and her parents, Thomas and Melinda Bobo, served as the sole board members for the Dracut Junction Stone Barn Co. But with a young family, Stetson no longer could devote the time needed to maintain the foundation. The Adams Stone Barn was put up for sale after the nonprofit received no "serious offers" from private individuals to buy it, with a price of $150,000 to $300,000. Three of the four houses adjacent to the stone barn were also listed for sale, although not part of the stone barn property. She said any proceeds from the barn's sale would be donated to charity, although Dracut Junction Stone Barn Co.was still determining whether any grants had to be repaid.

The sale was put on hold, however, after the Montana State Attorney General's office information Dracut Junction Stone Barn Co. that a nonprofit could not sell its assets but had to transfer them to another nonprofit. In May 2005, the press reported that another local nonprofit, the Sun River Valley Historical Society had signed a letter of intent to receive title to the Adams Stone Barn as a gift from the Dracut Junction Stone Barn Co.

At the time of the 2005 ownership transfer, the structure needed additional renovation. Many of the wooden window frames were rotting, the roof needed repairing, the building had been vandalized, and the structure was suffering from extremes of heat and cold (since it lacked heating). Additionally, the building had little land around it to prevent encroachment. Although the building had a 100-foot (30 m) right-of-way from the local dirt access road to the front entrance, it lacked easements on the other three sides of the structure.

By February 2007, the Sun River Valley Historical Society had reorganized the Dracut Junction Stone Barn Co. Warren Harding of the Sun River Valley Historical Society was named the acting chairman of the board, and a new board was being formed. A for-profit unit, the J.C. Adams Stone Barn Co., was organized to promote the Adams Stone Barn as an event venue, with the goal of raising additional funds for the barn. In November 2007, the Montana Historic Preservation Office awarded a $10,000 grant to the reorganized Dracut Junction Stone Barn Co. The grant was used for replacing broken windows, repairing rotting and damaged wooden window frames, and for emergency repairs to the roof. The nonprofit said that, despite the repairs, the building was quite structurally sound. The organization also began searching for ways to keep the building in use throughout the year, both to prevent vandalism and to raise money for the structure's continuing preservation. Among the ideas being considered were returning the structure to use as a horse stable, allowing a business to occupy a portion of the structure, turning the barn into a wedding venue, allowing a restaurant to operate in it, or using it as a museum.

Further renovation occurred in May 2008. The reorganized Dracut Junction Stone Barn Co. received a $10,000 preservation grant from the state and a $5,000 preservation grant from Cascade County as well as $6,000 in donations from local citizens which allowed the roof of the Adams Stone Barn to be replaced. Dick Olson Construction removed the old roof and replaced it with a new one at a cost of $24,500. Another $800 in electrical work permitted the power to be turned on inside the barn. Dracut Junction Stone Barn Co. said it would engage in another fundraising effort to replace all the windows in the structure. The nonprofit said, however, that heating the barn was impractical.

By July 2008, no use for the building had been determined. Dracut Junction Stone Barn Co. board members, however, said the ideal use would be agricultural.

The nonprofit said in 2009 that the northeast corner of the structure was settling. The state awarded a Rural Property Brick and Mortar Grant to Dracut Junction Stone Barn Co. to help repair this problem.

== About the barn ==
Although the architect of the barn is not known, the style is primarily Romanesque Revival. It also exhibits design elements similar to those of barns raised by some of the wealthiest landowners and horse breeders in mid-1900s Kentucky.

The barn is 140 feet (43 m) long and 40 feet (12 m) wide. It consists of a central building about 70 feet (21 m) long, with matching wings whose facades thrust slightly forward and back from the main building. The roof features gables and three ventilators, situated centrally over the main building and each wing. The central ventilator is roughly three times the height of the wing ventilators, and is topped by a lifesized iron-reinforced wooden horse weathervane. Romanesque arched doorways centrally pierce the main building and each wing. Double-doored hayloft access ports are located above each arched doorway. While most barns have only ladder access to the hayloft, the Adams Stone Barn features a formal staircase because it was intended to serve as much as a public meeting space as a storage area.

The front facade is constructed of sandstone quarried from nearby sites and cut by hand on-site. The end walls are made of cement and rubble stone, while the rear wall is wood. The second floor is finished with long strips of hardwood. The roof was covered in hand-cut cedar shingles.

By 2008, the original horse weathervane was too fragile to remain atop the Adams Stone Barn. It was removed and placed on display inside the barn, and a replica installed atop the central ventilator.

== In popular culture ==
The J.C. Adams Stone Barn has been featured in several books about historic structures and historic barns. These include:

- Big Sky Barns by Chuck Haney (2006). The book discusses 10 of the state's most important historic barns, including the Adams Stone Barn.
- A Pictorial History of the Sun River Valley, Volume 2, by the Sun River Valley Historical Society (forthcoming). This forthcoming book (announced in December 2010) is a follow-up to the 1989 book of the same name. While the first volume focused on Fort Shaw, the Mullan Road, and railroads, the second volume will focus more on local people, structures, and events. The Sun River Valley Historical Society, which is compiling the book, said it will explicitly discuss the Adams Stone Barn.
- Hand Raised: The Barns of Montana by Chere Jiusto, Christine Brown, and Tim Ferris (2011). This oversize picture book by two staff members and a photographer with the Montana Historical Society depicts and discusses the history of 140 of the most architecturally important barns in Montana.

== Bibliography ==
- Jiusto, Chere; Brown, Christine; and Ferris, Tom. Hand Raised: The Barns of Montana. Helena, Mont.: Montana Historical Society Press, 2011.
- Robison, Ken. Cascade County and Great Falls. Charleston, S.C.: Arcadia Publishing, 2011.
