= Boyd Adams =

American racecar driver (1934–2025)

- Born: January 1, 1934; Nashville, Tennessee, U.S.
- Died: June 25, 2025 (aged 91)

NASCAR Cup Series career
- 1 race run over 1 year
- Best finish: 135th (1965)
- First race: 1965 Nashville 400 (Nashville Fairgrounds)
Wins	Top tens	Poles
0	0	0

Boyd Adams (January 1, 1934 – June 25, 2025) was an American NASCAR driver. He started his first and only Grand National Division – later known as the Winston Cup Series – race at the Nashville Speedway in Nashville, Tennessee, during the 1965 Nashville 400.

Adams started the race last in a 1963 Ford, driving for Reid Shaw. In the 400-lap race, he completed only 15 laps before retiring due to a problem with the car's gas tank, and earned only $100. He finished 23rd of the 24 starters. He died on June 25, 2025, at the age of 91.

== Motorsports career results ==
=== NASCAR ===
(key) (Bold – Pole position awarded by qualifying time. Italics – Pole position earned by points standings or practice time. * – Most laps led.)

==== Grand National Series ====
NASCAR Grand National Series results
Year	Team Owner	No.	Make	1	2	3	4	5	6	7	8	9	10	11	12	13	14	15	16	17	18	19	20	21	22	23	24	25	26	27	28	29	30	31	32	33	34	35	36	37	38	39	40	41	42	43	44	45	46	47	48	49	50	51	52	53	54	55	NGNC	Pts	Ref
1965	Reid Shaw	23	Ford	RSD	DAY	DAY	DAY	PIF	AWS	RCH	HBO	ATL	GPS	NWS	MAR	CLB	BRI	DAR	LGY	BGS	HCY	CLT	CCF	ASH	HAR	NSV	BIR	ATL	GPS	MBS	VAL	DAY	ODS	OBS	ISP	GLN	BRI	NSV; 23	CCF	AWS	SMR	PIF	AUG	CLB	DTS	BLV	BGS	DAR	HCY	LIN	ODS	RCH	MAR	NWS	CLT	HBO	CAR	DTS	135th	60	
