= Amos Adams (footballer) =

English footballer

Personal information
- Date of birth: June 1880
- Place of birth: West Bromwich, England
- Date of death: 1941 (aged 60–61)
- Position: Defender

Senior career*
Years	Team	Apps	(Gls)
- George Salter Works
- Springfields
1898–1907	West Bromwich Albion	209	(3)
- * Club domestic league appearances and goals

Amos Adams (June 1880 – 1941) was a footballer who played in the Football League for West Bromwich Albion.
