= Tracey Adams (painter) =

American abstract painter and printmaker

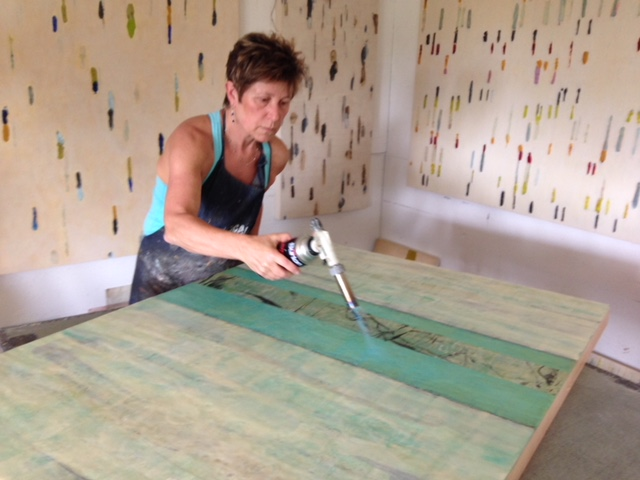
Adams in studio working with molten, pigmented beeswax and torches

Tracey Adams (born 1954) is an American abstract painter and printmaker. She was born in Los Angeles, the daughter of a ceramist. Her artworks reflect a strong interest in musical patterns, rhythms, lyrical compositional elements and what she calls a sense of performance. She lives and works in Carmel, California.

== Education ==
Adams earned her BA from Mount St. Mary's College in Los Angeles in 1978. She studied printmaking and painting at the School of the Museum of Fine Arts in Boston from 1979 to 1981 and earned her master's degree from the New England Conservatory of Music in 1980.

== Awards ==
Adams has received several fellowships and grants, including the Pollock-Krasner Foundation Grant in 2015, a grant from the US Department of State and the Ministry of Culture, and a Vermont Studio Center Fellowship.

== Exhibitions ==
Adams has exhibited extensively in solo and group shows throughout the United States and in Europe, including the Andy Warhol Museum in Medzilaborce, Slovak Republic.

== Collections ==
Work by Adams is part of the permanent collections of several museums, including the Bakersfield Museum of Art, the Monterey Museum of Art, the Fresno Art Museum, the Tucson Museum of Art, and the Santa Barbara Museum of Art. Her work is also part of multiple corporate collections, including those of Adobe Systems, AT&T Corporate Headquarters, Hallmark Corporate Headquarters, Sony Corporation, Albemarle Corporation, and Intel.
