= Bert Adams (disambiguation) =

Bert Adams (1891–1940) was an American baseball player.

Bert Adams may also refer to:

- Bert Adams, character in Always Greener
- Bert Adams (Canadian football), see 1934 in Canadian football
- Bert Adams (politician) (1916–2003), member of the Louisiana House of Representatives from 1956 to 1968
- Camp Bert Adams

== See also ==
- Albert Adams (disambiguation)
- Robert Adams (disambiguation)
- Herbert Adams (disambiguation)
