= Matthew Algernon Adams =

British physician (1836–1913)

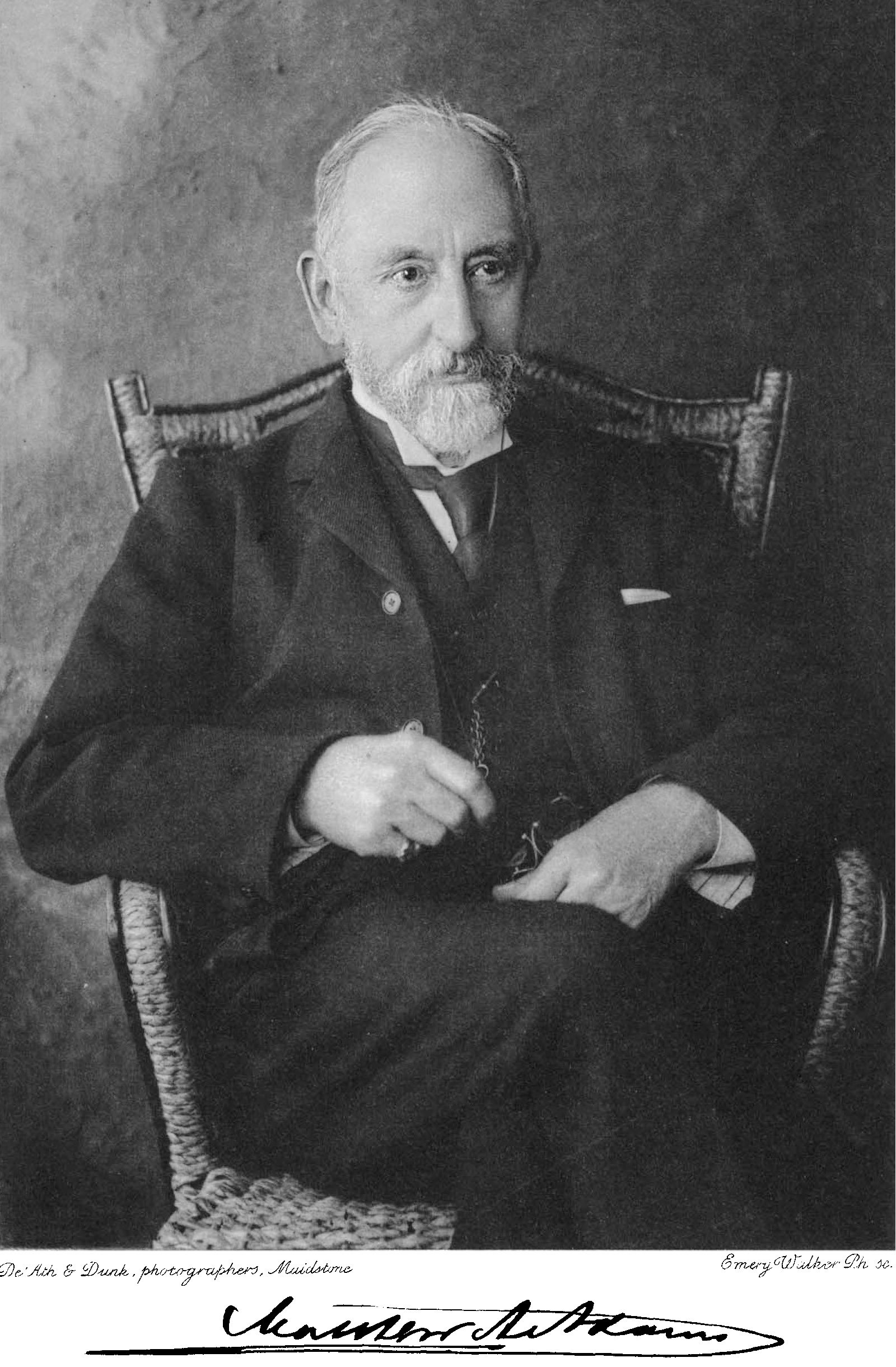
- Born: 9 August 1836; London, UK
- Died: 29 April 1913 (aged 76); Bearsted, UK

Matthew Algernon Adams (9 August 1836 – 29 April 1913) was a British medical doctor. He was the president of the Society of Public Analysts in 1889 and 1890, and a Fellow of the Royal Institute of Chemistry.

== Biography ==
Adams was born in London and studied medicine at Guy's Hospital, hearing chemistry lectures by William Odling. After having been house-surgeon to the Public Dispensary in Leeds he settled, soon after 1860, as a medical practitioner in Maidstone. He specialised in eye surgery, in which he excelled and earned an almost international repute. Hard-working and well-read, he had wide scientific interests, with a predilection for chemistry. In 1874, while the Sale of Food and Drugs Bill was under parliamentary discussion, Adams worked for some time in the laboratory of James Alfred Wanklyn, and was in the same year appointed Public Analyst for the county of Kent. He held that position till 1911.

Adams was one of the medical men who, when the Food and Drugs Act compelled local authorities to appoint public analysts knowledgeable in chemistry. At that time delicate questions involving an accurate knowledge of the chemistry of food had not yet arisen, and there was fair reason why appointing authorities should entrust to the doctors, who to them were the apostles of all that was scientific, the duty of controlling the food supply. Adams showed the importance of chemistry on several examples. In 1884, he found that cooked apple-pulp contained a substance reacting with iodine like starch. This method enabled the distinction of apple in mixtures with other fruits and was used in examination of jams.

For a few years close to 1880 a controversy raged round the composition and analysis of milk. James Alfred Wanklyn had stated that milk, apart from a considerable variation in the fat percentage, was of remarkably constant composition, the amount of "solids-not-fat" ranging from 9.0 to 9.3%. While this statement had never met with acceptance by continental chemists, public analysts had adopted Wanklyn's figures and methods of milk analysis. The Wanklyn's procedure for the separation of fatty and non-fatty constituents was rather crude and yielded vastly varying results, as demonstrated in a celebrated milk case, heard in Manchester in 1885. Adams proposed a rather simple alternative: by merely distributing a weighed quantity of milk over strips of blotting paper and thus subdividing the solids over a very large surface, the direct extraction of the fat from milk became easy and complete. It has become the standard method by which all other methods of fat-estimation in milk were judged and regulated. The observation in itself was a small one, but it has affected fifty thousand milk analyses made annually in Britain.

Adams married early in life, his wife being the daughter of the late Mr. John Prall, solicitor, of Rochester; she survived him, together with a son and three daughters. Adams was an avid traveller, and almost each year he and his wife would spend a lengthy vacation abroad.
