= George Adams (footballer, born 1926) =

Scottish footballer

Personal information
- Full name: George Adams
- Date of birth: 16 October 1926
- Place of birth: Falkirk, Scotland
- Date of death: July 2011 (aged 84)
- Place of death: Wandsworth, England
- Position: Wing half

Senior career*
Years	Team	Apps	(Gls)
- Brighton & Hove Albion
- Chelmsford City
1949–1950	Leyton Orient	4	(0)
1950–?	Bath City		
- Crystal Palace
- * Club domestic league appearances and goals

George Adams (16 October 1926 – July 2011) was a Scottish professional footballer who played in the Football League, as a wing half for Leyton Orient.

Adams was born in Falkirk on 16 October 1926. He started his career at Brighton & Hove Albion and played for Chelmsford City, before joining Leyton Orient in May 1949, making his League debut against Newport County in May 1950. Unable to hold down a place in the first team, he moved to Southern League side Bath City in July 1950, joining fellow new recruits Trevor Jones, Tommy Edwards and Wilson Fairweather. He scored 7 goals in 21 appearances for the Somerset club.
