= Isaac Adams (Maine politician) =

American politician

Isaac Adams (c. 1773 – 5 July 1834) was an American politician from Portland, Maine. Adams graduated from Dartmouth College and then served in the Massachusetts House of Representatives from 1808 to 1819. After Maine attained statehood in 1820, he served in the Maine House of Representatives; in the first Maine legislative session, he was one of three legislators from Portland and served alongside Asa Clapp and Nicholas Emery. He was elected to single-year terms from 1821 to 1824 and 1826 to 1830.
