= Addams =

Addams is a patronymic surname of English origin from the given name Adam. There are other spellings. Notable people with the surname include:

- Calpernia Addams (born 1971), American transgender author, actress, and activist
- Christian Hejnal Addams (born 1969), American producer and musician
- Charles Addams (1912–1988), American cartoonist, author of "The Addams Family"
- Dawn Addams (1930–1985), English actress
- Jane Addams (1860–1935), American founder of the Settlement House movement
- Jessicka Addams (born 1975), Italian-American artist, musician, and activist
- Olivia Addams (born 1996), Romanian singer
- William Addams (1777–1858), American politician, U.S. representative from Pennsylvania

Fictional characters:

- “The Addams Family”, American print cartoon by Charles Addams; and television series, films, and video games based on the cartoon
  - Morticia Addams, the family's reserved matriarch
  - Gomez Addams, patriarch of the family
  - Pugsley Addams, son of Gomez and Morticia, brother to Wednesday
  - Wednesday Addams, daughter of Gomez and Morticia, sister to Pugsley
