= Lee Adams (performance artist) =

British performance artist

- Born: 27 August 1970 (age 55); Liverpool
- Known for: Performance Art, Curator, Experimental Film Maker

Lee Adams (born August 27, 1970) is a London based performance artist, curator and experimental film maker. Much of his work has been influenced by the ideas of French dissident surrealist and philosopher Georges Bataille.

== Life and work ==
Adams studied Fine Art at The Ruskin School of Drawing and Fine Art, University of Oxford (1989–1992) under Professor Brian Catling. He has performed and exhibited extensively in London and internationally in Milan, Athens, Belfast, Paris, Bordeaux, Lausanne, Berlin, Tallinn, Vilnius, Copenhagen, Sydney, Houston, New York City, San Francisco, Los Angeles and Mexico City.

In 2003 he performed The Language of Flowers for Visions of Excess, an eighteen-hour event inspired by Georges Bataille's book of collected early essays (1927–1939), featuring Udo Kier, Bruce LaBruce, Slava Mogutin and Kembra Pfahler, curated by Ron Athey & Vaginal Davis for Fierce! Festival. He performed with Guillermo Gómez-Peña at Tate Modern.

In 2006 he collaborated with Athey to curate The Monster in the Night of the Labyrinth, commissioned by The Hayward Gallery, London as part of the exhibition Undercover Surrealism, Georges Bataille & Documents.

This was followed by a series of collaborative events with Athey including Re-Visions of Excess for the finale of the 10th anniversary of Fierce! Festival in 2007, Visions of Excess at SHUNT Vaults, London, commissioned by the SPILL Festival of Performance in 2009 and A History of Ecstasy (2009) alongside Othon Mataragas, Ernesto Tomasini, Vaginal Davis, Julie Tolentino, Mouse and Pigpen at the Museo d'Arte Contemporanea Donna Regina (MADRE) Naples, as part of the Napoli Teatro Festival Italia.

He later performed in London for Panic, curated by Guerrilla Zoo at the Old Abattoir, alongside works by the founders of Mouvement Panique - Alejandro Jodorowsky and Roland Topor and in Copenhagen for Visions of Excess at the International Festival of Performance Art alongside Kira O'Reilly, Dominic Johnson, Lazlo Pearlman and Mouse at Warehouse 9.

He presented Through A Glass Darkly, a retrospective lecture covering his early experimental films and more recent documented performance at the London Underground Film Festival, hosted by the Horse Hospital London in December 2010.
