= Sidney Adams =

English cricketer

Personal information
- Full name: Sidney Clarke Adams
- Born: 17 August 1904; Northampton, England
- Died: 24 March 1945 (aged 40) near Hamminkeln, Germany
- Batting: Right-handed
- Bowling: Leg-break

Career statistics
Competition	First-class
Matches	11
Runs scored	158
Batting average	10.53
100s/50s	0/1
Top score	87
Balls bowled	359
Wickets	13
Bowling average	19.23
5 wickets in innings	1
10 wickets in match	0
Best bowling	6/32
Catches/stumpings	5/–
- Source: CricketArchive, 6 December 2022

Sidney Clarke Adams (17 August 1904 – 24 March 1945) was an English first-class cricketer. He was a right-handed batsman and a leg-break bowler who played 11 matches of first-class cricket for Northamptonshire between 1926 and 1932.

Adams was born in Northampton. His only first-class fifty, a knock of 87, came against Dublin University in a match in which he recorded his best bowling figures of 6 for 32 and took wickets with the first two balls he bowled in first-class cricket. The victim of his first delivery was the playwright Samuel Beckett.

Gunner Adams died on 24 March 1945 near Hamminkeln, Germany, while serving with the 53rd (Worcestershire Yeomanry) Air Landing Light Regiment, Royal Artillery. He is buried at the Reichswald Forest War Cemetery.
