= W. Adams =

English football manager

W Adams
Managerial career
- Years: Team
- 1905–1912: Shrewsbury Town

W. Adams was the first manager of Shrewsbury Town F.C. He managed the club for seven years, between 1 May 1905 and 31 May 1912, during which period the club moved from Copthorne barracks ground to the Gay Meadow site. He was also manager during the then-record attendance for a Shrewsbury Town match of 5,000 against Wellington Town.
