= Truly Adams =

American Racing Driver

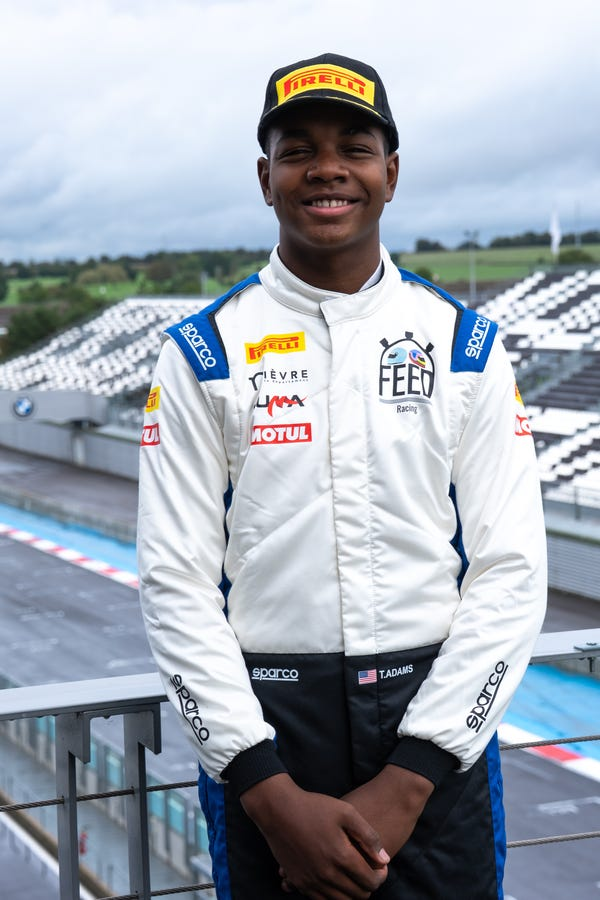
- Truly Adams at FEED Racing 2025 Volant F4
- Nationality: (United States) American
- Born: 2009 or 2010 (age 15–16) Riverside, California, U.S.
- Statistics up to date as of December 15, 2025.

Truly Adams (born c. 2010) is an American racing driver and karting champion. He is best known for winning the 2022 Tillotson T4 Nations Cup world title in the Junior category and for becoming the first American driver to reach the finals and podium at the FEED Racing F4 Academy in France in 2025.

== Early life ==
Adams was born in Riverside, California. He is the son of Troy Adams, a former NASCAR Featherlite Southwest Tour driver and driving coach. His family owns and operates Adams Motorsports Park, a karting circuit in Riverside, which has been in his family since 1959. In 2022, Adams was featured alongside his father on the Discovery+ reality series Baby Drivers, which followed young karters training under Troy Adams. Adams is fluent in Spanish and is studying French to aid his European racing career.

== Racing career ==
=== Karting ===
Adams began competitive karting at a young age, training at his family's circuit. In 2022, he traveled to Valencia, Spain, to compete in the Tillotson T4 Nations Cup. He won the world title in the T4 Junior class, finishing ahead of international competition in the final event. In June 2023, Adams won the KA100 Junior class at the SKUSA Pro Tour SpringNationals, his first SKUSA Pro Tour victory.

He returned to the Nations Cup in 2023 to defend his title. Although he crossed the finish line first in the final race, he was subsequently penalized for a front fairing violation (a bumper penalty common in karting), which relegated him to 12th place in the final classification.

=== Formula 4 ===
In 2025, Adams transitioned to open-wheel car racing. He entered the FEED Racing F4 Academy, a talent search program founded by 1997 Formula One World Champion Jacques Villeneuve and Patrick Lemarié, based at the Circuit de Nevers Magny-Cours in France.

Adams was one of six drivers selected from an initial pool of 62 international candidates to advance to the Grand Final. In October 2025, he became the first American finalist in the program's history. He finished third overall in the "Finale Blanche" session, securing a podium spot driving the Mygale M21-F4 chassis. His performance earned him a funded test day in a French Formula 4 car.

Ahead of the 2026 season, Adams signed with Berg Racing to compete in the Ligier Junior Formula Championship. On 11 April 2026, he finished second in both Ligier Junior Formula Championship Gen. 1 races at NOLA Motorsports Park.

== Karting record ==
=== Karting career summary ===
Season	Series	Team	Position
2022	Tillotson T4 Nations Cup – Junior	Team USA	1st
2023	SKUSA Pro Tour SpringNationals – KA100 Junior	Troy Adams Coaching / Factory Kart	1st
2023	Tillotson T4 Nations Cup – Junior	Team USA	12th
