= Lois Bryan Adams =

American journalist

- Born: Lois Bryan; October 14, 1817; Moscow, Livingston County, New York, U.S.
- Died: June 28, 1870 (aged 52); Washington, D.C., U.S.
- Resting place: Constantine Township Cemetery, Constantine, Michigan, U.S.
- Occupations: writer; newspaper editor; newspaper proprietor
- Spouse: James Randall Adams (m. 1841; died 1848)
- Writing career
- Pen name: L.
- Language: English

Lois Bryan Adams (née , Bryan; pen name, L.; October 14, 1817 – June 28, 1870) was an American writer, as well as a newspaper editor and proprietor. During twenty years, Adams was a contributor to the newspaper literature of Michigan, and wrote occasionally for New York periodicals of wide circulation. Her articles were favorites with the publishers of Graham's Magazine and the Ladies' Book. She published one book during her lifetime, entitled Sybelle ond Other Poems (1862) while Letter From Washington, 1863-1865 (1999) was published posthumously.

== Early life and education ==
Lois Bryan was born in Moscow, Livingston County, New York, October 14, 1817. Her parents were John (d. 1864) and Sarah (Babcock) Bryan (d. 1876). John Bryan was born in West Stockbridge, Massachusetts, February 1, 1794. Sarah Babcock was born in Whitestown, New York, June 22, 1794. They were married May 7, 1815, in the town of Leicester, New York. The family came to Michigan in 1823, when Lois was six years old. They had five children, Lois being the second, and Sarah the youngest. February 1824, a son was born, being the first white child born in Washtenaw County, Michigan, he was named Alpha Washtenaw Bryan.

John Bryan was an excellent carpenter, and the job of building the court-house at Ann Arbor, Michigan having been let to him, he moved his family to that place where they lived during the summer and fall of 1834. On the first day of 1835, they arrived at Constantine, Michigan, having been five days on the road, with household goods and children, all on one wagon with a long reach.

She had in early life, at Woodruff's Grove, Michigan the advantage of a school kept in her father's house by her aunt, Eliza Bryan. Lois afterwards attended the common school in Ypsilanti, Michigan and also a select school taught by Mrs. Mark Norris. Here Lois undoubtedly got a love of literature for which she was noted later in her life, or, at least, it was stimulated and made stronger by association with a teacher of literary culture as was possessed by Mrs. Norris, and, no doubt she established a taste in Lois for the higher and nobler things of the mind, as well as literature. While living in Ann Arbor, Michigan in 1834, Lois also had the advantage of a good select school. At her home in Constantine, Michigan, she attended the district school. She was also instructed by her elder sister who taught a school in her father's house. Her literary taste at this time included Shakespeare, Scott, and the English classic writers. The limited range of her father's library confined her to fewer books than she would have desired. Her habits were very retiring. She was something of a recluse, and sought little society aside from that of her home, her books, her writing, and the muses. She used to sit day after day on the banks of the St. Joseph River, writing in her blank books, filled with her earliest poems. In the winter of 1839, Lois was a student in the branch university located at White Pigeon, Michigan and received here the first prize for composition. Here, she also made a creditable advance in the higher studies.

== Career ==
On April 16, 1841, at the old farmhome, Constantine, Michigan, she married James Randall Adams, a newspaper editor and publisher. Mr. Adams was the editor of the White Pigeon Republican, published at that place. From White Pigeon, Mr. and Mrs. Adams went to Centreville, Michigan, and here for two or three years, he published the Centerville Democrat. In 1845, they removed to Kalamazoo, Michigan, where he, for a year or more, edited the Kalamazoo Gazette. Leaving Kalamazoo, he became proprietor of a sawmill on Spring Brook, near Gov. Enos T. Throop's, farm, north of Kalamazoo. Throop became a warm admirer of Mrs. Adams, and greatly enjoyed her society and literary abilities. At this home, a few miles north of Kalamazoo, Mr. Adams died in 1848.

Widowed and left without financial resources, Adams devoted herself to school teaching. She spent three years in Kentucky as a teacher, and here she got a knowledge of slave life on which she was writing a story at the time of her death.

Returning to Michigan, she became a regular contributor to the Michigan Farmer. In 1856, she became editor of the household department of the Michigan Farmer, and removed to Detroit. In 1858, she bought an interest in the Farmer, and in connection with R. F. Johnstone, the editor-in-chief, she devoted her time and talent to the literary and business affairs of the paper.

The civil war for the Union having forced, for a time, the suspension of the Michigan Farmer, Adams went to Washington, D.C. and was made clerk in the Department of Agriculture, and was finally promoted to the office of copyist in that department. She was also one of the commissioners appointed to take charge of the sick and wounded soldiers in the Washington hospital during the war.

Though a prolific writer, Adams published only one book, entitled Sybelle ond Other Poems and with the pen name, "L.". While living in Washington, her letters on life in that city were published in the Detroit Advertiser and Tribune. While visiting her oldest sister in Illinois, in 1853, her interesting letters from that state were published in the New-York Tribune. During the latter part of her life, when the business exactions of her position absorbed so much of her time, she did not write much poetry. Previous to this, her poems were published in the leading journals of Michigan. Published posthumously, Letter From Washington, 1863-1865, by Lois Bryan Adams (Wayne State University Press, 1999), was edited by Evelyn Leasher, who also provided an introduction.

== Personal life ==
In early life, Adams was a zealous Methodist. Later, she left the Methodist Episcopal Church. While living in Washington, she became interested in Emanuel Swedenborg.

She had no children.

In May 1870, Adams visited her old home in Michigan and in June, she returned to Washington. Wearied with work, she developed a severe cold, and before her friends knew of her sickness, she died, June 28, 1870, in Washington, D.C. The remains were brought to her Michigan home and laid by the side of her father in the Township Cemetery, at Constantine.

== Selected works ==
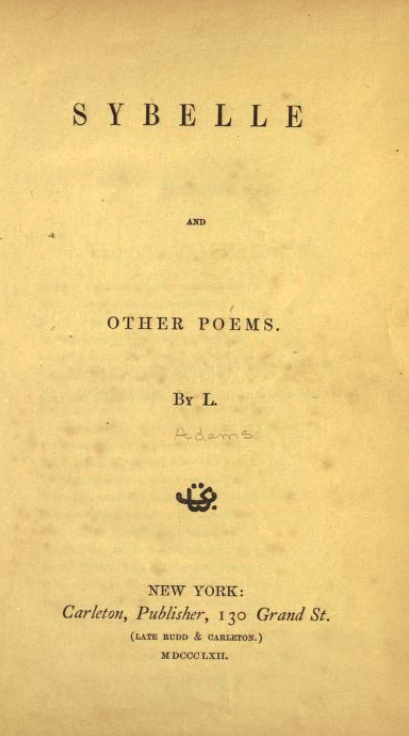
Sybelle and other poems (1862)

=== Books ===
- Sybelle ond Other Poems (1862)
- Letter From Washington, 1863-1865 (1999)
