= Ondigui Adams =

Cameroonian footballer (born 1987)

Personal information
- Full name: Ondigui Adams
- Date of birth: December 28, 1987 (age 38)
- Place of birth: Yaoundé, Cameroon
- Height: 1.77 m (5 ft 10 in)
- Position: Defensive midfielder

Senior career*
Years	Team	Apps	(Gls)
- Nassara
2006	Portuguesa Santista		
2006	Santos		
2007	Sport Recife		
2007	→ Grêmio (Loan)		
2008	Portuguesa Santista		
2010	Camboriú		
2011–2012	Canon Yaoundé		
- * Club domestic league appearances and goals as of October 23, 2007

Ondigui Adams, usually known as Adams (born December 28, 1987 in Yaoundé), is a Cameroonian football defensive midfielder.

Before moving to Portuguesa Santista, in 2006, he played for Nassara, which is a Cameroonian team. In 2006, he also played for Santos. In 2007, he joined Sport Recife, and then moved on loan to Grêmio, returning to Portuguesa Santista in 2008.
