= Francis Adams (translator) =

Scottish medical doctor and translator (1796–1861)

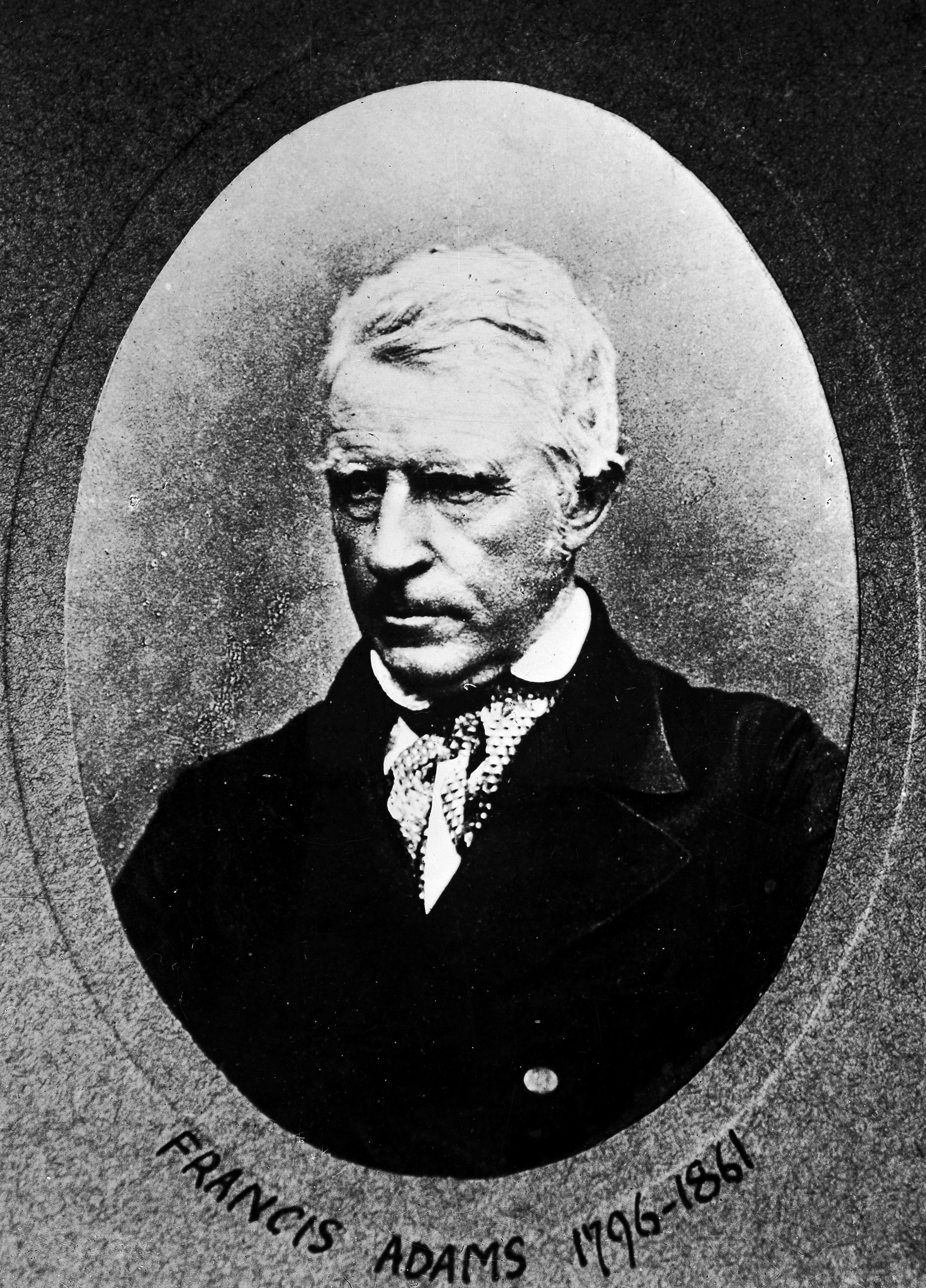
- Born: 13 March 1796; Lumphanan, Aberdeenshire
- Died: 26 February 1861 (aged 64); Banchory, Aberdeenshire
- Education: King's College, Aberdeen
- Children: at least 2, including Andrew Leith Adams

Francis Adams (13 March 1796 – 26 February 1861) was a Scottish medical doctor and translator of Greek medical works.

He was born in Lumphanan, Aberdeenshire. Adams had a practice in Banchory, Aberdeenshire, from 1819 to 1861. Because there were no English translations of the medical tracts of the Greek, Roman, and Arabian doctors, Adams undertook many translations himself, which were widely published.

== Works ==
- Doctissimus medicorum Britannorum
