= Roger Adams (printer) =

English printer and bookseller

Roger Adams (c.1681 – 1741) of Chester was a printer, publisher, and bookseller, and amongst the first printers of Welsh texts. 'Ystyriaethau o Gyflwr Dyn' (1724) was probably his earliest publication.
