= Fran Adams =

American actress

- Occupation: Actress

Fran Adams is an American actress who performed with Second City.

== Biography ==
Adams was an ensemble member of the Chicago based improvisational comedy troupe Second City. She is a featured player in the DVD release of The Best of Second City, a compilation of some of the most memorable sketches that helped make Second City one of the United States' foremost comedy troupes. Adams was a lead player in the Second City TV pilot entitled 149 1/2 along with other players such as Steve Carell, Judith Scott and Jackie Hoffman.

She performed with the troupe during the 1988 to 1994 seasons and in 2009 was invited to perform in the 50th anniversary celebration of Second City.
