= JJ Adams =

English pop artist

Jason John Adams (born March 1978) is an English mixed media contemporary pop artist and graphic designer.

== Life ==
Adams was born in Plymouth, England in 1978, the son of a Baptist minister. He lived in Manchester before moving to Cape Town, South Africa at the age of 6 in 1984.

During his school career, Adams was held back a total of two years and attended 11 different schools, including a borading school from which he was expelled, his ADHD was a constant struggle and he was prescribed Ritalin. After completing his GCSE's in order to get into art college, he took a graphic design course at Cape College, where he found that he did well in subjects like screen printing and early computer design but he only completed his first year at college after taking a job in a tattoo studio.

Adams worked in Wildfire Tattoos for a number of years in central Cape Town which he says hugely influenced him. He was interested in music, and played guitar in a band as a teenager while also being heavily into skateboarding and graffiti. In 1997 Adams was arrested for vandalising the side of a building in Cape Town with graffiti. His later work would feature graffiti and street art as well as his tattoo and musical influences. JJ's family returned to Plymouth, England in 1998.

After emigrating back to the UK Adams decided to move to London to become a tattoo artist. He describes giving up the dream when he "realised it wasn't what he was meant to be" after meeting London's tattoo godfather Lal Hardy and not having the confidence in himself to pursue this art form. Years later, Hardy would become a collector of Adams' work.

After several drug-fuelled years working in London's Camden Market between 1999-2003 and being an assistant manager at Cyberdog, a retail shop in Covent Garden, at the age of 24 JJ Adams returned to Plymouth where he enrolled in the Plymouth College of Art & Design to study commercial printing. He also worked for a commercial printing company where he worked on magazine layout and in the pre-press department exposing screens and plates for the lithographic printing presses.

Not long after this, Adams started his own commercial sign and graphic design business while working on art in his spare time.

In 2010 after selling a few of his acrylic paintings through a local gallery he decided it was time to move back to London and pursue his art career.

== Work ==
Adams' work can be found in galleries in the UK, US and Canada, he has done exhibitions with the likes of Rolls-Royce and Bang & Olufsen, and has been featured in magazines such as Vogue and GQ.

He describes his work as a simple formula of remixing old with something new. He uses a range of mixed media formats including spray painting, hand painting in acrylics, screen printing, collage, digital matte painting and photography.

His work features elements of graffiti, street art, tattoos and celebrity icons. Adams has developed his own unique style of hiding many things in his paintings, a style that he learned from his father and a jigsaw puzzle he loved as a child, as well spending many hours studying album covers from bands like Iron Maiden and Pink Floyd. As a child and teenager, Adams always hid things in his drawings.

Adams has curated bespoke artworks for two high-profile London restaurants, Hyde in Kensington and The Frog by Adam Handling in Covent Garden. His work is collected by celebrities and famous musicians such as Slash from Guns N' Roses and Shaun Ryder of the Happy Mondays. His work has also been featured on television shows such as Made in Chelsea, Britain's Next Top Model and Through the Keyhole.

Adams says his biggest influence is South African artist Derric Van Rensburg alongside other artists such as Storm Thorgerson, Norman Rockwell, Roy Lichtenstein, Andy Warhol and Sir Peter Blake. Most of his inspiration comes from film, television, music and life experience.

== Personal life ==
JJ Adams works from his art studio in West Sussex.
