= Mike Adams =

Mike Adams may refer to:

== Sports ==
=== American football ===
- Mike Adams (offensive tackle) (born 1990), American football offensive tackle for the Pittsburgh Steelers
- Mike Adams (safety) (born 1981), American football safety who played 16 seasons in the NFL for six different teams
- Mike Adams (wide receiver) (born 1974), former American football wide receiver of the Pittsburgh Steelers

=== Other sports ===
- Mike Adams (outfielder) (born 1948), Major League Baseball outfielder
- Mike Adams (pitcher) (born 1978), Major League Baseball pitcher
- Mike Adams (footballer) (born 1965), English former professional footballer
- Mike Adams (football manager) (born 1959), English manager of the Grenada national football team

== Other people ==
- Mike Adams (columnist) (1964–2020), American conservative columnist
- Mike Adams, founder of website Natural News

== See also ==
- Michael Adams (disambiguation)
