= Douglas J. Adams =

United States Navy rear admiral

Douglas J. Adams is a Rear Admiral in the United States Navy.

== Biography ==
Douglas J. Adams initially enlisted in the U.S. Navy before being commissioned as an officer via the Officer Candidate School. His early career included serving aboard the USS Tennessee (SSBN-734) and the USS Bremerton (SSN-698).

After serving as the Executive Officer of the USS Toledo (SSN-769), Adams was the Commanding Officer of the USS Rhode Island (SSBN-740) from 2010 to 2013. Among his assignments on land have been serving as an ROTC instructor at Marquette University and in the Office of the Naval Inspector General.

In 2024, Adams was promoted to Rear Admiral. He then assumed the role of Program Executive Officer, Undersea Warfare Systems.

Adams is a native of Valparaiso, Indiana. He holds a bachelor's degree in electrical engineering from Auburn University and a master's degree in civil and environmental engineering from Marquette University.
