= George Adams (newspaperman) =

George Adams (27 August 1836 – 20 November 1918) was editor and proprietor of the Albury Banner, a newspaper in Albury, New South Wales.

== History ==
Adams was born in London and on leaving school was apprenticed to a printer. In October 1854 he left for Australia on the sailing ship Sussex, accompanied by his brother, and found employment with the Melbourne Argus, but soon headed for the gold diggings at Ovens. Rather than fossick for gold, he earned good money at his trade, on the Ovens and Murray Advertiser of Beechworth. From there he travelled to Albury, where he took the job of compositor on George H. Mott's Border Post (founded 1856), and later worked on the Deniliquin Pastoral Times. In April 1862 Adams was able to purchase the Albury Banner, founded in 1860 by solicitor Samuel Fry Blackmore. He changed it from bi-weekly to weekly publication and changed its orientation to land matters, leaving the subject of politics to the Border Post. Adams engaged Henry A. Brooks (c. May 1826 – 25 May 1867), a brother of the novelist Shirley Brooks, as editor while himself becoming something of a land agent, to his considerable financial benefit. In 1884 he took on his eldest son George S. Adams and editor Foster Cooper as business partners. A curious coincidence is the fact that Cooper was a fellow passenger with Adams on the Sussex in 1854, and not realised until they became business associates. The Banner printing shop was sited at 623 David Street, Albury.

== Other interests ==
- Adams gave generously to St Matthew's (Anglican) Church, Albury.
- He became a justice of the peace in 1881, and for many years was a member of the Albury Licensing Bench.
- He was a member of the Discharged Prisoners' Aid Society.
- He gave much assistance to free settlers.
- He took considerable interest in the attempts of Wagga candidate James Gibb to unseat Sir William Lyne from the State electorate of Hume, and of the Federal seat of Hume.

== Family ==
Adams married Mary Sunderland; she died sometime around 1891; they had four (some said three) sons and one daughter.

- George Sunderland Adams (13 December 1861 – 1 June 1951) He married Thornton in 1891
- William Barker Adams (c. 1864 – 19 July 1926)
- Mary Ann "Polly" Adams (20 July 1867 – ) married Robert Thornton on 7 May 1889
- Thomas Henry Adams (c. 1870 – 17 July 1938)
- Henry Adams ( – 7 March 1943) married Lydia Caroline Shipard on 14 September 1893.

Their home for many years was "Marylands" at 465 Guinea Street, Albury, built in 1867. He married again, to Margaret Catherine Blakely (1872 – 16 March 1944); they had one son:

- Arthur George Adams

They had a home "Adamshurst", at 601 David Street. The property was acquired by the Education Department in 1943 as a hostel for high school students. It was heritage listed in 1977.

== Last years ==
He sustained a paralytic stroke in 1914, and died four years later. His remains were interred at the Albury cemetery.
