= Guerrilla Zoo =

Arts organization

Guerrilla Zoo logo

Guerrilla Zoo is a contemporary arts organisation formed in 2004 by founder and creative director James Elphick. The group produce a variety of creative events from experiential environments, live concerts, festivals, immersive theatre, art exhibitions, arts awards, parties and masquerade balls.

== Early Events ==
The group fronted by James Elphick curated a series of irregular happenings starting in April 2005 at Corsica Studios encompassing live art, live music & performance art. These events gained equal measures of popularity and notoriety and culminated with their last event at the venue in early 2010.

== William S. Burroughs ==
On Friday 28 March 2008 at The Synergy Centre in Oval, London, Guerrilla Zoo held an event in homage to the works of cult writer William S. Burroughs which marked a changing point in the direction of its events. The popularity of the experiential event which combined all the elements of previous events but within an immersive environment set the precedent for future shows. Interzone was influenced by the strange and seedy city of Interzone described by Burroughs in his books, inspired by his time living in the north Moroccan city of Tangier during the late 1950s.

On Friday 7 February 2014 at Bunker 51 in North Greenwich, London, Guerrilla Zoo returned to Interzone to celebrate Burroughs centennial with a new experimental event, with blessing from his estate. Dazed and Confused Magazine cited it as "The ultimate centenary party for the late creative rebel".

For ten days over August and September 2014, Guerrilla Zoo's artistic director James Elphick and Yuri Zupancic curated an exhibition entitled 'Animals in the Wall' featuring over 50 original artworks by William S Burroughs, alongside artists such as Brion Gysin, Shepard Fairey, Cleon Peterson and Matt Black of Coldcut, amongst others. The exhibition was premiered in Shoreditch at Londonewcastle Project Space.

== Alejandro Jodorowsky ==
In November 2009 Guerrilla Zoo celebrated the work of iconic figure of the arts Alejandro Jodorowsky in a season presenting his work through theatre, film and music at venues in London. Events such as: The première of Alejandro Jodorowsky and his wife Pascale Montandon collaborative visual art at The Horse Hospital, also Brontis Jodorowsky starred in the solo production The Gorilla based on Franz Kafka's Report to an Academy at Leicester Square Theatre, and the first Modern Panic exhibition was held at The Old Abattoir, plus many other Jodorowsky-related events.

== Modern Panic ==
The Modern Panic series is inspired by Alejandro Jodorowsky's Panic Movement and launched in 2009 originally as part of Season of Jodorowsky. The now annual exhibition features provocative and controversial international artists and live art's practitioners. It has established "a reputation for introducing new and edgy art" and been cited as "livening up modern art."

== The Goblin King's Masquerade Ball ==
In September 2010 Guerrilla Zoo launched a yearly themed and costumed ball which explores the darker side of fantasy. The Goblin King's Masquerade Ball features promenade theatre, interactive creatures, puppetry, art installations & site-specific immersive games alongside live music, performance and occasionally market traders. In part inspired by the British conceptual designer and artist Brian Froud and the trend of Renaissance events in USA. The event attracts large audiences from around UK and across Europe and has been featured on Arte TV.

== Make Believe Festival ==
In May 2013 the Make Believe Festival was launched, a festival designed to explore the world of immersive experiential story-telling alongside traditional festival staples of live music and performance.
