= Jean Adams (epidemiologist) =

Epidemiologist

- Website: www.epi.ims.cam.ac.uk/people/jean-adams/

Jean Adams is an epidemiologist and Professor of Dietary Public Health at the MRC Epidemiology Unit based at the School of Clinical Medicine, University of Cambridge. Her research focuses on population-level influences on dietary public health, and interventions to improve such health.

== Education ==
Adams earned a PGCert in Science Communication from the University of the West of England in 2012; a MSc in 2007 at the City, University of London in Health Psychology; in 2004, a Ph.D. at Newcastle University in Epidemiology and Public Health and a MBBS there in 2001 as well as a BMedSci in Health Psychology and Psychiatry in 1998.

Her doctorate was on the socio-economic inequalities of health, after which she completed a MRC Health of the Population fellowship and an NIHR Career Development Fellowship.

== Career ==
While completing her fellowships, Adams was a lecturer at Newcastle University before moving to the MRC Epidemiology Unit in 2004 and CEDAR in 2014. CEDAR is a partnership between the University of Cambridge, the University of East Anglia, and the MRC Epidemiology Unit to explore diet improvement. She helped form the Dietary Public Health group, was appointed Programme Leader in the Population Health Interventions unit in 2020 and Professor in 2022.
