= Paul Adams (center) =

American football player and coach (1919–1995)

Biographical details
- Born: December 12, 1919; Coal Grove, Ohio, U.S.
- Died: September 24, 1995 (aged 75); Russell, Kentucky, U.S.

Playing career
- 1938–1941: Morehead State
- 1947: Pittsburgh Steelers
- 1948–1949: Richmond Rebels
- Position: Center

Coaching career (HC unless noted)
- 1950–1955: Morehead State (assistant)
- 1956–1958: Morehead State

Head coaching record
- Overall: 4–21–4

Paul Hampton Adams (December 12, 1919 – September 24, 1995) was an American football player and coach. He played for the Pittsburgh Steelers of the National Football League (NFL) in 1947. Adams served as the head football coach at Morehead State University in Morehead, Kentucky from 1956 to 1958, compiling a record of 4–21–4.

== Head coaching record ==
Year	Team	Overall	Conference	Standing	Bowl/playoffs
Morehead State Eagles (Ohio Valley Conference) (1956–1958)
1956	Morehead State	2–6	0–5	6th	
1957	Morehead State	2–7	0–5	6th	
1958	Morehead State	0–8–1	0–6	7th	
Morehead State:		4–21–4	0–16		
Total:		4–21–4			
