= Emily Adams =

British scientist

- Education: Bristol University
- Known for: Molecular diagnostics
- Scientific career
- Institutions: Liverpool School of Tropical Medicine
- Website: www.lstmed.ac.uk/about/people/dr-emily-adams

Emily Adams is a Reader in Diagnostics for Infectious Disease at Liverpool School of Tropical Medicine. She is diagnostic lead for the Centre for Drugs and Diagnostics developing with industry diagnostics for various diseases. She is also the Director for Epidemics and Neglected Tropical Disease at Global Access Diagnostics (formerly Mologic), a not-for-profit diagnostics company in the UK.

== Life ==
She was World Health Organization TDR (Special Programme on Tropical Diseases Research) consultant in their RDT evaluation for Leishmaniasis program whilst working at the Koninklijk Instituut voor de Tropen.
