= James Alfred Wanklyn =

James Alfred Wanklyn FRSE FCS
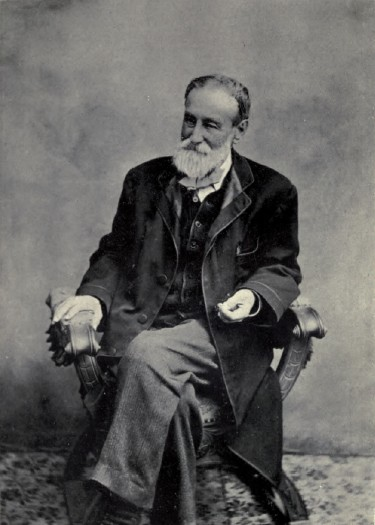

Personal details
- Born: 18 February 1834 Ashton-under-Lyne, Lancashire, England
- Died: 19 July 1906 (aged 72) New Malden, Surrey, England
- Occupation: Analytical chemist

James Alfred Wanklyn (18 February 1834 – 19 July 1906) was a nineteenth-century English analytical chemist who is remembered today chiefly for his "ammonia method" of determining water quality and for his fierce arguments with those, such as Edward Frankland, who opposed him over matters related to water analysis.

He worked with Edward Frankland and Lyon Playfair.

He gives his name to the Wanklyn reaction.

== Life ==
He was born in Ashton-under-Lyne on 18 February 1834 the son of Thomas Wanklyn and his wife, Ann Dakeyne, both members of the Moravian Brethren. He was educated at the Moravian School in Fairfield, Lancashire. He was at first apprenticed to a physician in Manchester 1843 to 1848. This seemed to inspire an interest in drugs and human health. He then went to study Chemistry at Owen's College in Manchester. He then did postgraduate studies at Heidelberg under Robert Bunsen in Germany 1857 to 1859.

In 1859 he moved to Edinburgh and became a Demonstrator in Chemistry at Edinburgh University.

In 1860 he was elected a Fellow of the Royal Society of Edinburgh his proposer being Lyon Playfair. In 1863 he was appointed Professor of Chemistry at the London Institution. He left the Institution in 1870 to concentrate on writing of scientific articles. During this period he founded the Society of Public Analysts.

In 1877 he returned to London to lecture in Chemistry and physics at St George's Hospital but resigned in 1880. He was thereafter Public Analyst to New Malden.

He died at home, 6 Derby Villas in New Malden in Surrey on 19 July 1906. He is buried in New Malden Cemetery

== Selected editions of writings ==
- Tea, coffee and cocoa: a practical treatise on the analysis of tea, coffee, cocoa, chocolate, maté (Paraguay tea), etc., London: Trubner and Company, 1874
- Milk Analysis. A practical treatise on the examination of milk and its derivatives, cream, butter, and cheese, London: Trubner and Company, 1874
- Air Analysis: a practical treatise on the examination of air. With an appendix on illuminating gas, London: Kegan Paul, Trench, Trubner and Company, 1890
- Arsenic, London: Kegan Paul, Trench, Trubner and Company, 1901
- Sewage Analysis, 2nd edition, London: Kegan Paul, Trench, Trubner and Company, 1905
- Water-analysis, a practical treatise on the examination of potable water, 1st edition 1876, 11th edition, London: Kegan Paul, Trench, Trubner and Company, 1907
