= Jeanne Clare Adams =

American computer scientist

- Born: June 15, 1921
- Died: April 21, 2007 (aged 85)
- Education: University of Michigan (BS) University of Colorado (MS)

Jeanne Clare Adams (June 15, 1921 – April 21, 2007) was an American computer scientist. She was Chairman of the ANSI X3J3 Fortran Standards Committee that "developed the controversial Fortran 8X proposal".

She graduated with a BS in economics from the University of Michigan in 1943, and an MS in telecommunications and electrical engineering from the University of Colorado in 1979. From 1943-1946 she worked as a systems analyst for the Army Air Corps and from 1947-1949 as a research statistician at Harvard University. Her longest held position was at the National Center for Atmospheric Research, Boulder, Colorado, from 1960 to 1981, serving from 1984 to 1997 as deputy head of the Computing Division. Adams was also chair of the International Standards Organization Committee on Programming Languages (TC97/SC5), now ISO/IEC JTC 1/SC 7 and the ANSI Fortran Standards Committee (X3J3). Adams wrote reference manuals for computer equipment such as the CYBER 205.

== Selected publications ==
- Adams, Jeanne C., Walter S. Brainerd, and Charles H. Coldberg, Programmer's Guide to Fortran 90, McGraw-Hill, New York, 1990.
- Adams, Jeanne C., Walter S. Brainerd, J. Martin, B. Smith, and J. Wagener, Fortran 90 Handbook, McGraw-Hill, New York, 1992.
