= Donald Adams (cricketer) =

English cricketer (1880–1976)

Career statistics
Competition	First-class
Matches	1
Runs scored	26
Batting average	13
100s/50s	0/0
Top score	14
Balls bowled	138
Wickets	1
Bowling average	83
5 wickets in innings	0
10 wickets in match	0
Best bowling	1/28
Catches/stumpings	2/–
- Source: CricketArchive, 12 January 2023

Donald Adams (8 June 1880 – 8 January 1976) was an English first-class cricketer. He was born in Ockley, Surrey and died in Walton-on-Thames. A fast medium bowler, he played one match for Surrey County Cricket Club in 1902 against W.G. Grace's London County at Crystal Palace Park. His only first-class wicket was that of W.G. Grace, bowled in the first innings for 10. London County won the match by 196 runs.
