= Eddie Adams (racing driver) =

American racing driver

- Born: Rising Sun, Maryland, U.S.

NASCAR Cup Series career
- 2 races run over 2 years
- First race: 1950 race #14 (Langhorne Speedway)
- Last race: 1952 race #9 (Langhorne Speedway)
Wins	Top tens	Poles
0	0	0

Eddie Adams is an American former racecar driver from Rising Sun, Maryland. He made two NASCAR starts; both at the circle track at Langhorne Speedway. He finished 34th in 1950 and 13th in 1952.

== Racing career results ==
NASCAR Grand National Series results
Year	Owner	No.	Make	1	2	3	4	5	6	7	8	9	10	11	12	13	14	15	16	17	18	19	20	21	22	23	24	25	26	27	28	29	30	31	32	33	34	NGNC	Pts	Ref
1950	N/A	48	Ford														LAN 34																					N/A	N/A	
1952	N/A	N/A	Plymouth									LAN 13																										102nd	N/A	
