= Matthew Adams (American football) =

American football player (born 1995)

Profile
- Position: Linebacker

Personal information
- Born: December 12, 1995 (age 30); Cleveland, Mississippi, U.S.
- Listed height: 6 ft 0 in (1.83 m)
- Listed weight: 230 lb (104 kg)

Career information
- High school: Hightower (Missouri City, Texas)
- College: Houston (2014–2017)
- NFL draft: 2018: 7th round, 221st overall pick

Career history
- Indianapolis Colts (2018–2021); Chicago Bears (2022); Cleveland Browns (2023); New York Giants (2024)

Career NFL statistics
- Total tackles: 102
- Forced fumbles: 2
- Fumble recoveries: 2
- Stats at Pro Football Reference

Matthew Adams (born December 12, 1995) is an American professional football linebacker. He played college football for the Houston Cougars.

== College career ==
Adams played four seasons for Houston. He led the Cougars with 82 tackles in 2016 and finished second with 88 in 2017. In his college career, he posted 259 tackles, 21 tackles for loss, and 7.5 sacks.

== Professional career ==
Pre-draft measurables
Height	Weight	Arm length	Hand span	40-yard dash	10-yard split	20-yard split	20-yard shuttle	Three-cone drill	Vertical jump	Broad jump	Bench press
6 ft 0 in (1.83 m)	229 lb (104 kg)	31 1/4 in (0.79 m)	9 5/8 in (0.24 m)	4.65 s	1.63 s	2.70 s	4.46 s	7.05 s	33.5 in (0.85 m)	10 ft 2 in (3.10 m)	30 reps
All values from Pro Day

=== Indianapolis Colts ===
Adams was selected by the Indianapolis Colts in the seventh round (221st overall) of the 2018 NFL draft.

Adams made an appearance in two postseason games, registering one tackle and one special teams stop. On September 26, 2020, Adams was placed on injured reserve with an ankle injury. He was activated on November 7, 2020. He was placed on the reserve/COVID-19 list by the team on November 11, and activated on November 16. In Week 12 against the Tennessee Titans, Adams was ejected from the game after punching Titans' linebacker Nick Dzubnar.

=== Chicago Bears ===
On April 9, 2022, Adams signed a one-year contract with the Chicago Bears. He suffered a calf injury in Week 5 and was placed on injured reserve on October 11. He was activated on November 16. For his one year with Chicago, Adams appeared in 10 games and recorded 22 tackles, the most tackles since his rookie year.

=== Cleveland Browns ===
On March 21, 2023, Adams signed with the Cleveland Browns. He played in every game for the Browns as a back-up and special teams player.

=== New York Giants ===
On April 12, 2024, Adams signed with the New York Giants. He was placed on injured reserve on August 27. He was activated on October 5.
