= Benjamin C. Adams =

American politician (1847–1906)

Member of the Mississippi State Senate from the 28th district
- In office January 1900 – January 1904

Mayor of Grenada, Mississippi
- In office May 4, 1896 – May 2, 1898
- Succeeded by: A. S. Bell

Personal details
- Born: Benjamin Chinn Adams; July 16, 1847 Carroll County, Mississippi, U.S.
- Died: May 1, 1906 (aged 58) Grenada, Mississippi, U.S.
- Party: Democratic

Benjamin Chinn Adams (July 16, 1847 – May 1, 1906) was a Mississippi Democratic politician and state senator from 1900 to 1904. He also served as the mayor of Grenada, Mississippi, from 1896 to 1898.

== Biography ==
Benjamin Chinn Adams was born on July 16, 1847, in Carroll County, Mississippi. He was a planter and a lawyer. From May 4, 1896, to May 2, 1898, he was the mayor of Grenada, Mississippi. In 1899, he was elected to represent the 28th District, which comprises Mississippi's Yalobusha and Grenada counties, in the Mississippi State Senate. He died on May 1, 1906, in Grenada, Mississippi.
