= J. C. Adams (politician) =

Mayor of Phoenix Arizona and businessman

John C. Adams
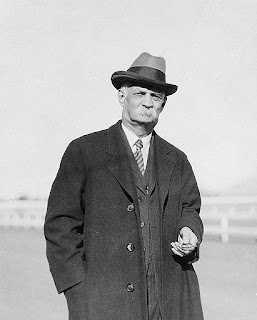

17th and 23d Mayor of Phoenix
- In office 1897 – May 11, 1899
- Preceded by: James D. Monihon
- Succeeded by: Czar James Dyer
- In office 1905–1905
- Preceded by: John T. Dunlap
- Succeeded by: Frank B. Moss

Personal details
- Party: Republican

John C. Adams was an American politician and businessman who served as the 17th and 23rd mayor of Phoenix, Arizona until resigning in 1905. He founded the Adams Hotel.

== Family ==
Adams' granddaughter Elizabeth Adams Rockwell became a member of the Arizona house of representatives.
