= John Adams (disambiguation) =

John Adams (1735–1826) was a Founding Father of the United States and served as its second president.

John Adams may also refer to:

== Relatives of the United States president ==
- John Adams Sr. (1691–1761), father and grandfather, respectively, of two U.S. presidents
- John Quincy Adams (1767–1848), sixth president of the United States and son of President John Adams
- John Adams II (1803–1834), son of President John Quincy Adams and grandson of President John Adams
- John Quincy Adams II (1833–1894), American politician and grandson of President John Quincy Adams
- John Quincy Adams (railroad official) (1848–1919), land and townsite agent for Milwaukee Railroad

== Politics ==
=== United States ===
- John Adams (Virginia politician) (1773–1825), mayor of Richmond, Virginia
- John Adams (New York politician) (1778–1854), congressman from New York
- John Q. Adams (Wisconsin politician) (1816–1895), Wisconsin state legislator
- John W. Adams (Kentucky politician) (1936–2011), Kentucky state legislator
- John W. Adams (Wisconsin politician) (1862–1939), Wisconsin state legislator
- John Adams (Wisconsin politician) (1819–1908), Wisconsin state legislator
- John H. Addams (1822–1881), Illinois state senator and father of Jane Addams
- John J. Adams (1848–1919), congressman from New York
- John T. Adams (1862–1939), Republican National Committee chairman
- John Adams Sr. (Nebraska politician) (1876–1962), American minister, lawyer, and politician
- John Adams Jr. (Nebraska politician) (1906–1999), American lawyer and politician
- John Adams (Ohio politician) (born 1960), Ohio House of Representatives
- John Adams (journalist) (1819–1897), American lawyer, politician and journalist in Maine
- J. C. Adams (politician) (John C. Adams), American politician and businessman in Arizona

=== Elsewhere ===
- John Adams (Pembroke MP) (by 1511–1571/75), Welsh MP for Pembroke Boroughs
- John Adams (merchant) (1672/3–1745), American-born member of the Nova Scotia Council
- John Adams (Carmarthen MP) (c. 1746–1817), British politician
- John Adams, 1st Baron Adams (1890–1960), British politician and public servant
- Tom Adams (politician) or Jon Adams (1931–1985), prime minister of Barbados

== Academics ==
- John Adams (Master of Sidney Sussex College, Cambridge) (died 1746), Master of Sidney Sussex 1730–1746
- John Adams (educational writer) (1750?–1814), Scottish compiler of books for young readers
- John Adams (educationist) (1857–1934), Scottish educator and principal of the Institute of Education
- John Cranford Adams (1903–1986), American educator and president of Hofstra University
- John Adams (geographer) (1938–2024), English professor of geography and theorist on risk compensation

== Arts and entertainment ==
=== Music ===
- John Clement Adams (born 1947), American composer and educator
- John Adams (composer) (born 1947), American composer of classical music and opera
- John Luther Adams (born 1953), American composer whose music is inspired by nature
- Jon Adams (musician) (born 1939), American folk musician

=== Literature ===
- John Adams (poet) (1705–1740), only son of the Nova Scotian merchant John Adams
- John K. Adams (1915–2003), English journalist and ornithologist; editor of Country Life
- John Joseph Adams (born 1976), American science fiction and fantasy fiction editor
- John Turvill Adams (1805–1882), American novelist
- John Quincy Adams (editor) (1848–1922), American newspaper editor and publisher

=== Performing arts ===
- John "Grizzly" Adams (1812–1860), American mountain man and animal trainer
- John L. Adams (born 1973), American actor, comedian and director

=== Visual arts ===
- John Clayton Adams (1840–1906), English landscape artist
- John Quincy Adams (painter) (1874–1933), Austrian genre and portrait painter
- John Wolcott Adams (1874–1925), American illustrator

=== Works of art ===
- John Adams (book), a 2001 biography by David McCullough
- John Adams (miniseries), a 2008 HBO television miniseries based on McCullough's book
- John Quincy Adams (Bingham), a portrait of the president by George Caleb Bingham

== Law ==
- John Hicks Adams (1820–1878), deputy U.S. Marshal for the Arizona Territory 1878
- John Jay Adams (1860–1926), American lawyer and judge
- John R. Adams (born 1955), U.S. federal judge
- John Donley Adams (born 1973), American lawyer and candidate for Attorney General of Virginia
- J. Christian Adams (born 1968), American attorney and conservative activist
- John T. Adams (born 1962), American lawyer and district attorney in Berks County, Pennsylvania

== Military ==
- John Worthington Adams (1764–1837), British general in India
- John Giles Adams (1792–1832), U.S. commander at the Battle of Stillman's Run during the 1832 Black Hawk War
- John Adams (Confederate Army officer) (1825–1864), US Army officer
- John G. B. Adams (1841–1900), Civil War Medal of Honor recipient
- John Mapes Adams (1871–1921), Boxer Rebellion Medal of Honor recipient
- John Adams (Royal Navy officer, died 2008) (1918–2008), British rear admiral
- John Adams (Royal Navy officer, died 1866) (1798–1866), British rear admiral
- John G. Adams (1932–2003), Army counsel in the Army-McCarthy hearings
- John Adams (Canadian general) (born 1942), Canadian military leader

== Religion ==
- John Adams (Protestant martyr) (died 1546), burnt to death
- John Adams (Catholic martyr) (c. 1543–1586), English Catholic priest who was hanged, drawn, and quartered
- John Adams (Provost of King's College, Cambridge) (1662–1720), British Anglican priest
- John Adams (minister) (c. 1704–1757), Scottish minister and moderator of the General Assembly of the Church of Scotland
- John Adams (educator) (1772–1863), who organized several hundred Sunday schools
- John Greenleaf Adams (1810–1897), editor of religious texts
- John Adams (educational writer) (c. 1750–1814), Scottish minister and author of school texts
- John Hurst Adams (1927–2018), American civil rights activist and Bishop in the African Methodist Episcopal Church
- John Adams (bishop) (born 1963), New Zealand Roman Catholic bishop

== Science ==
- John Adams (physicist) (1920–1984), British accelerator physicist
- John Adams (mathematician) (1738–1802), British mathematician
- John Couch Adams (1819–1892), British mathematician and astronomer
- John Franklin Adams (1843–1912), British amateur astronomer and author of stellar maps
- John Gennings Curtis Adams (1839–1922), Canadian dentist and father of dental public health in Canada
- John Stacey Adams, behavioral psychologist known for equity theory

== Sports ==
=== Football ===
- John C. Adams (1887–1969), American college football player
- John Adams (offensive lineman) (1921–1969), American football offensive lineman
- John Adams (running back) (1937–1995), American football player
- Johnny Adams (gridiron football) (born 1989), American football cornerback
- John Adams (center), college football player

=== Hockey ===
- Jack Adams (ice hockey, born 1919) (John Ellis Adams, 1919–1996), Canadian ice hockey winger in the NHL with the Montreal Canadiens
- John Adams (ice hockey, born 1946), Canadian ice hockey goaltender

=== Other sports ===
- Bert Adams (John Bertram Adams, 1891–1940), American baseball player
- John H. Adams (jockey) (1914–1995), American Hall of Fame jockey
- John Adams (basketball) (1917–1979), All-American basketball player from Arkansas
- John Adams (drummer) (1951–2023), perennial attendee of Cleveland Indians baseball home games
- John Adams (golfer) (born 1954), American professional golfer
- John Adams (judoka) (born 1960), Dominican Republic judoka

== Other people ==
- John Adams (cartographer) (c.1643–1690), produced a map of England and Wales
- John Adams (mutineer) (1767–1829), aboard HMS Bounty
- John Adams (glassmaker) (1823–1886), pioneer glass manufacturer
- John Bodkin Adams (1899–1983), British physician and suspected serial killer
- John Frank Adams (1930–1989), British mathematician
- John H. Adams (environmentalist) (born 1936), founding director and trustee of the Natural Resources Defense Council
- John Till Adams (1748–1786), English Quaker physician
- John Adams (shoemaker) (1745–1849), American shoemaker, veteran and centenarian
- John Adams (architect) (died 1938), British architect active in Uruguay
- John Adams (economist), Australian economist, public policy advocate and conspiracy theorist

== Other uses ==
- Johnadams, a minor planet
- John Adams, California, the former name of Centerville, California, US
- USS John Adams, several US Navy ships
- John Quincy Adams (train), of the New York, New Haven & Hartford Railroad
- John Adams Institute for Accelerator Science, a UK physics research institute named for the physicist John Adams
- John Adams Institute (Netherlands) (Stichting John Adams Instituut), a 1987 American cultural promotion organization

== See also ==
- Jonathan Adams (disambiguation)
- John Adam (disambiguation)
- Jack Adams (disambiguation)
- John Bertram Adams (disambiguation)
- John Quincy Adams (disambiguation)
