= John Quincy Adams (disambiguation) =

John Quincy Adams (1767–1848) was the sixth president of the United States. Others with the name include:

- John Quincy Adams II (1833–1894), American lawyer and politician, grandson of the president
- John Quincy Adams (railroad official) (1848–1919), employee of the Milwaukee Road Railroad, namesake of Adams County, North Dakota
- John Quincy Adams (painter) (1874–1933), Austrian genre and portrait painter of American ancestry
- John Quincy Adams (editor) (1848–1922), proprietor of The Appeal newspaper
- John Quincy Adams (train), a train of the New York, New Haven & Hartford Railroad
- John Q. Adams (Wisconsin politician) (1816–1895), state politician
- John Quincy Adams (Bingham), a portrait painting by George Caleb Bingham

== See also ==
- John Adams (disambiguation)
