= George Wallace (disambiguation) =

George Wallace (1919–1998) was governor of Alabama and a candidate for president of the United States.

George Wallace may also refer to:

== In arts ==
=== Australia ===
- George Wallace (Australian comedian) (1895–1960), Australian comedian, vaudevillian, radio personality and actor
- George Leonard Wallace (1918–1968), his son, Australian comedian, vaudevillian, television personality and actor

=== United States ===
- George Wallace (author), American novelist
- George Wallace (American comedian) (born 1952), American actor, comedian and screenwriter
- George D. Wallace (1917–2005), American actor
- George Wallace (film), a 1997 film about the Alabama governor

== In politics, military, law, and government ==
=== Africa and Oceania ===
- Watty Wallace (George Walter Gordon Wallace, 1900–1964), member of the Queensland Legislative Assembly
- George Wallace (diplomat) (born 1938), Liberian foreign minister, 2006–2007
- George Wallace Bollinger (1890–1917), diarist and WWI New Zealand soldier

=== Europe ===
- George Wallace (advocate) (1727–1805), Scottish jurist, son of Robert Wallace
- George Wallace, Baron Wallace of Coslany (1906–2003), British Labour MP for Chislehurst 1945–50, Norwich North 1964–74
- George Wallace, Baron Wallace of Campsie (1915–1997), Scottish businessman and peer

=== North America ===
- George Wallace (Georgia politician) (died 1881), African-American state senator in Georgia during reconstruction
- George Wallace Jr. (born 1951), American politician, son of governor George Wallace, and former Alabama state treasurer
- George W. Wallace (1872–1946), U.S. army officer
- George E. Wallace (North Dakota politician), North Dakota tax commissioner
- George Scott Wallace (1929–2011), British Columbia physician and politician
- George Wallace Jones (1804–1896), American senator from Iowa

== Sports ==
- George Wallace (American football), one of Fordham University's earliest football coaches
- George Wallace (English cricketer) (1854–1927), English cricketer
- George Wallace (New Zealand cricketer) (1913–1997), New Zealand cricketer

== See also ==
- George Wallis (disambiguation)
- Georg Wallace, Norwegian politician and great-great-grandfather of Roald Dahl
