= John Adam =

John Adam may refer to:

- John Adam (architect) (1721–1792), Scottish architect
- John Adam (silversmith) (1774–1848), silversmith and painter in Virginia
- John Adam (administrator) (1779–1825), British administrator in India
- John Adam (legislator) (fl. 1860–1887), Wisconsin populist legislator from Milwaukee
- John Adam (sailor) (1875–1946), British sailor, won silver medal at 1908 Summer Olympics
- John A. Adam (journalist) (born 1949), American reporter
- John A. Adam (mathematician), British-American applied mathematician
- John Adam (rugby league) (born 1955), Australian rugby league player
- John Adam (actor) (born 1960s), Australian television and theatre actor
- John Adam (MP) (died 1440), for New Romney
- John Adam (hoax), the name given by Islamic militants to a U.S. soldier they claimed to have captured
- John J. Adam (1807–1888), Scottish-American teacher, businessman, and politician

== See also ==
- John Adams (disambiguation)
- Jonathan Adams (disambiguation)
