= George Turnbull (theologian) =

Scottish philosopher and theologian

George Turnbull (11 July 1698 – 31 January 1748) was a Scottish philosopher, theologian, teacher, writer on education and an early but little-known figure in the Scottish Enlightenment. He taught at Marischal College, Aberdeen, worked as a tutor and became an Anglican clergyman. Aside from his published writings on moral philosophy, he is also known for the influence he exerted on Thomas Reid and as the first member of the Scottish Enlightenment to publish a formal treatise on the theory and practice of education.

== Life ==
George Turnbull was born on 11 July 1698 in Alloa, Clackmannanshire. He was the son of George Turnbull, a minister, and his wife Elizabeth, and the third of their nine children. Turnbull began his studies at the University of Edinburgh in 1711 and started studying for a degree in divinity in 1717, graduating MA in 1721. During his years of study in Edinburgh, he became involved with the Rankenian Club, a circle of intellectuals, which included those who would become his closest associates: George Young, the surgeon and William Wishart, a preacher. At this time, Turnbull was interested in creating a rational form of Christianity, which led to his correspondence with John Toland, and the writing of an essay in defence of religious toleration which was never published.

Turnbull was made regent at Marischal College, Aberdeen, on 14 April 1721. His two graduation theses were De scientiae naturalis cum philosophia morali conjunctione from 1723 and De pulcherrima mundi cum materialis tum rationalis constitutione from 1726. These two works indicate that he was the first Scottish thinker to publish writings that argued for the use of the so-called Newtonian method in constructing a moral philosophy. Turnbull also drew heavily on the ideas of Lord Shaftesbury. Although this might be taken to indicate a preoccupation with the scholarship of his time, Turnbull showed great fondness for the classical moralists of antiquity.

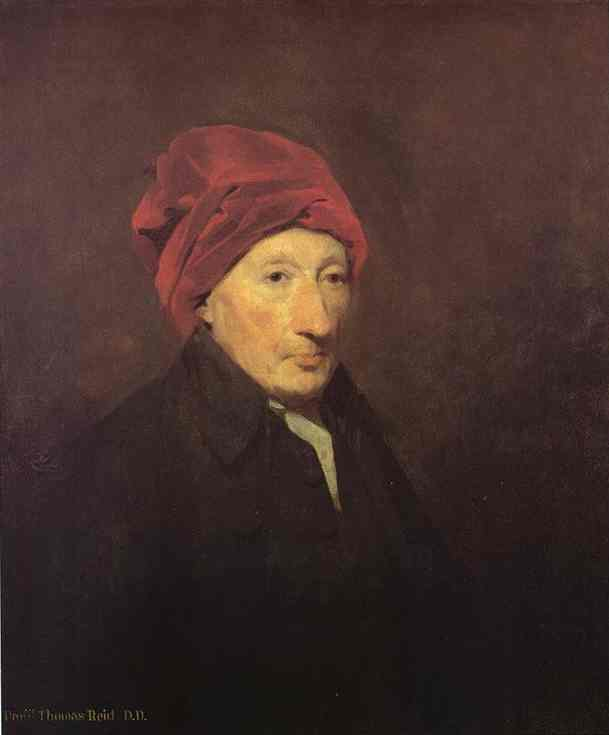
Turnbull is believed to have influenced his pupil Thomas Reid, who played an integral part in the Scottish Enlightenment.

Although Turnbull was a popular teacher and exerted lasting influence on pupils such as Thomas Reid, he nevertheless decided to leave Marischal. He sought a position elsewhere and had disputes with the principal of the college, Thomas Blackwell. Turnbull left the college without prior leave and went to serve as tutor to the Udney family. In 1727 he formally resigned. After his resignation, he took on tutoring jobs and travelled on the Continent of Europe. He then received a degree from the University of Edinburgh. At this point, Turnbull decided that he might seek employment in the Anglican church, and matriculated at Exeter College, Oxford, in 1733 and received a BCL degree.

Financial difficulties forced Turnbull to resume tutoring, and with some misgivings he spent 2 years in Italy, tutoring the son of Lord Rockingham. In 1737 he used his connections with Thomas Birch to secure his ordination by the bishop of Winchester. This precipitated his entry into court circles and in 1741 he was made chaplain to the Prince of Wales. A year later, Turnbull was granted the position of rector of Drumachose by the bishop of Derry and became the tutor of Horace Walpole in 1744.

== Works ==
Over the course of the 1730s and 1740s, Turnbull published a series of pamphlets and books which drew heavily on his theological concerns. He published a small tract in 1731 which was inspired by a passage in Lord Shaftesbury's writings: A philosophical enquiry concerning the connexion betwixt the doctrines and miracles of Jesus Christ, where he maintains that just as experiments confirm scientific theories, so the miracles of Jesus Christ confirm Christian doctrine. Turnbull then wrote a critique of Matthew Tindal in Christianity neither False nor Useless, Tho' not as Old as the Creation in 1732, which dwelled on the relationship between natural religion and revealed religion.

In 1740, Turnbull published A Treatise on Ancient Painting, where he argued for the educational usefulness of the finer arts, based on the idea that painting was a kind of language, conveying ideas and truths about life, philosophy and nature, with drawings by Camillo Paderni. Later that year, he published a brief religious work, An Impartial Enquiry into the Moral Character of Jesus Christ. In this work, Turnbull expounded Christ as the greatest of moral philosophers. He also published the greatest statements of his philosophy in The Principles of Moral and Christian Philosophy, which drew on his old Aberdeen lectures as well as his discussions with philosophers on the Continent. Turnbull's last significant work was published in 1742: Observations upon Liberal Education, where he suggested a new categorisation and breakdown of knowledge, and a revision of university curriculum.

Turnbull died in The Hague on 31 January 1748 for reasons unknown.
