= John Bertram Adams =

John Bertram Adams may refer to:

- John Bertram Adams (physicist) or Sir John Adams (1920–1984), British accelerator physicist
- John Bertram Adams (baseball) or Bert Adams (1891–1940), American baseball player

== See also ==
- John Adams (disambiguation)
