= James Hill (surgeon) =

Scottish surgeon (1703–1776)

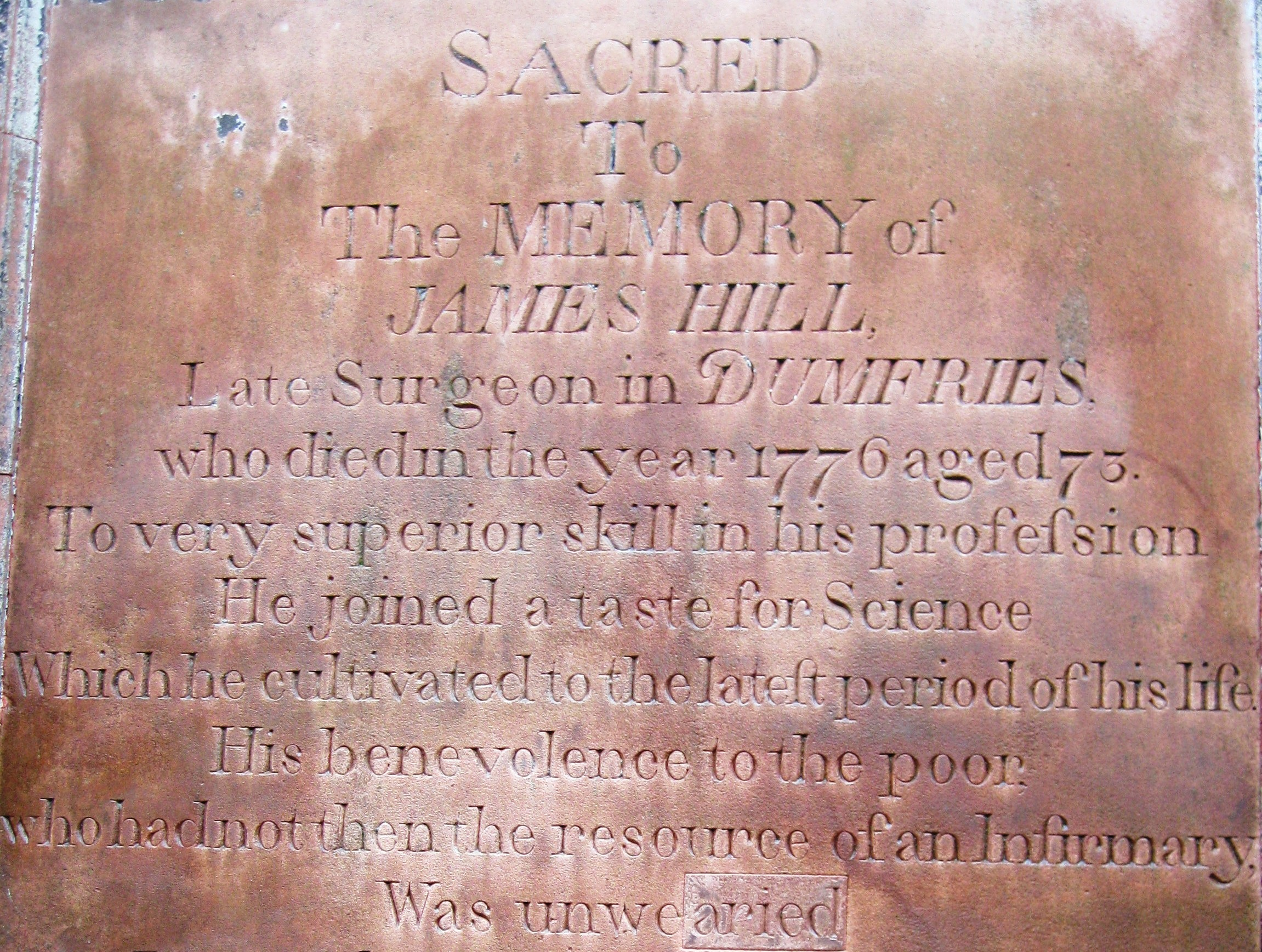
James Hill's grave in St Michael's Churchyard Dumfries.jpg

James Hill (30 October 1703 – 18 October 1776) was a Scottish surgeon working in Dumfries who advocated curative excision for cancer rather than the palliative approach adopted by many leading surgeons of the day. By follow-up of his patients over years he demonstrated that his radical approach resulted in better outcomes than those published by contemporaries. His experience in diagnosing and treating intracranial bleeding after head injury by directed trephine resulted in the best results published in the 18th century and represent an important landmark in the management of post-traumatic intracranial haemorrhage.

== Early life ==
James Hill was the son of Rev James Hill (1676-1743), minister of the parish church of Kirkpatrick Durham in Kirkcudbrightshire, and his wife Agnes Muirhead (1678-1742), daughter of a Dumfries merchant. James Hill was born in the village of Kirkliston, West Lothian on 30 October 1703. On 17 May 1723 he was apprenticed to the Edinburgh surgeon, physician and philosopher George Young (1692-1757), from whom he learned the value of careful observation and scepticism in medicine. It is known from Hill's later writing that Young was a powerfully influential figure to his young apprentice during the latter's formative professional years. Hill, like many Edinburgh surgical apprentices attended lectures at Surgeons’ Hall but like the majority of apprentices of the period did not proceed to a surgical diploma or a medical degree in the newly established University of Edinburgh Medical School. During Hill's apprenticeship there was no teaching hospital in Edinburgh. He later wrote "There was no infirmary in Edinburgh when I served my apprenticeship there, so that I never had an opportunity of seeing a cancerous breast extirpated or any other capital operation performed till I performed them myself." The first teaching hospital (the "Little House") opened opposite the head of Robertson's Close on 6 July 1729. Hill joined the Royal Navy as a surgeon in 1730. At this time naval surgeons were certified for the purpose after an examination by the Court of Examiners of the London Company of Barbers and Surgeons and many naval surgeons of the day had no other formal qualifications.

== Surgical practice in Dumfries ==
In 1732 Hill returned to Dumfries where he set up in surgical practice. On 28 January 1733 he married Anne McCartney, whose father John owned the Blacket (or Blaiket) estate, in the Parish of Urr and it was there that they established the family home. His practice was conducted from his town house in Amisfield's Lodging in the Fleshmarket, in Dumfries. There is no known portrait of James Hill but Murray provides this description: "... his height being about five feet eleven inches. He continued till his death to prefer that fashion of dress that had prevailed in his youth. He wore a full wig; and used a large staff. He was a man of dignity both of appearance and manners." Between 1742 and 1775, Hill trained sixteen surgical apprentices. Of these one, Benjamin Bell (1749-1806) was to achieve international fame largely through the success of his best selling textbook A System of Surgery first published in 1783.

== Hill’s early writing ==
Hill wrote a number of articles for the medical journal Medical Essays and Observations which had been launched in 1733 by the Society for the Improvement of Medical Knowledge, which would eventually become the Royal Society of Edinburgh. This was one of the earliest regular medical journals and it provided a vehicle for case reports and other types of article.

Hill's articles give an insight into the range of conditions with which he dealt as a surgeon-apothecary, and his understanding of their causes and treatment. He contributed a case report about a patient who was temporarily ‘cured’ of syphilis by a ‘mercurial suffumigation’. After various therapies including laudanum, tonics, claret and Dr Plummer's pills were unsuccessful, he resorted to mercury, a recognised treatment for syphilis and fumes were thought to be the fastest mode of delivery. The symptoms eventually and she survived for more than a year. This report demonstrates that surgeons in Scotland at this time truly acted as surgeon-apothecaries. His report on two cases of hydatid disease describes one patient discharging hydatid cysts via a chronic cutaneous fistula from the liver and the other discharging cysts in the sputum. Both recovered without active treatment. Although able to diagnose hydatid disease he thought the condition arose because ‘some people have hydatic constitutions.’

== Cases in Surgery ==
In 1772 Hill published Cases in Surgery a summary of his life's work as a surgeon. Cases deals with the infectious disease sibbens, with cancers and with ‘disorders of the head from external violence’.

== Sibbens ==
Sibbens is now known to be endemic syphilis, a Treponemal infection spread by non-sexual social contact and seen in association with deprivation, especially overcrowded living conditions, poor sanitation and malnutrition. Hill's account is written ‘to rectify the mistakes’ in the MD thesis on the topic submitted to the University of Edinburgh on the topic by Adam Freer in 1767. Hill concluded that syphilis and sibbens were the same disease and that sibbens, having been introduced into a family by sexual means, could then be transmitted around the family by close non-sexual contacts, giving his own family as an example of this mode of transmission. His apprentice Benjamin Bell, who was the first to show that syphilis and gonorrhoea were different diseases, also subscribed to this mode of transmission. Hill, like Freer before him and Bell after him, believed that the most successful treatment was mercury, supplemented on occasion by Peruvian bark. Hill was clear that sibbens and what he termed West Indian yaws were distinct diseases. Subsequent writers credited Hill and his physician colleague and friend Dr Ebenezer Gilchrist (bap1708-1774) with providing the most precise description of the clinical features and natural history of the disease in Scotland. Hill and Gilchrist also appreciated that the condition could be prevented by improving personal hygiene and avoiding contact with sufferers, and both men advocated these and similar preventive measures.

== Cancers ==
Hill's views on cancer treatment were that cancers should be radically excised aiming for cure, an approach in contrast to the mainstream view of leading European surgeons such as Alexander Monro primus, Samuel Sharp (c1709– 1778) and Henri François Le Dran (1685–1770) that cancers should only be minimally excised to relieve symptoms. He was able to review the outcome of surgery in 88 patients, 86 of whom recovered from the procedure and 77 of these enjoyed a normal expectation of life ‘according to the bills of mortality.’ These outcomes were much superior to the documented results of, for example, Alexander Monro primus. The cancers concerned were mainly skin cancers and a few breast cancers and Hill acknowledges the difficulty in dierentiating some cancers from benign lesions in the era before histological examination. He concludes that his results justify his recommendation that tumours, including ‘the most trifling,’ should be ‘cut entirely out.’

== Head injuries ==
It is Hill's chapter entitled ‘Disorders of the head from external violence’ that marks him out as a careful clinician and an innovative surgeon able to achieve remarkable outcomes by the standards of the day. Hill recorded 18 cases of head injury which he had treated over 40 years. The cause of the injury, the clinical features, his treatment and the outcome in each case are all recorded in detail. Head injuries, he asserts, have been treated in ‘a much more rational manner’ in the previous 15 years as a result of discoveries and ‘valuable publications’ over that period. He describes the rationale for his treatment and how this changed over time as his knowledge and understanding of the problems progressively increased. He gives ‘a historical view of the gradual progress of the improvements made by others as well as by myself.’ His first patient, a five-year-old boy, sustained a depressed frontal fracture associated with an epidural haematoma (EDH). When the fracture was elevated and the haematoma drained by trepanning the skull, the boy ‘immediately recovered his senses’ but after some days the ‘stupor’ returned, indicating that 'some matter was lodged under the meninges’. Hill made a cruciate incision in the meninges to drain the haematoma with beneficial effect. Ganz regarded this as the first ever description of a lucid interval associated with a subdural haematoma. This case also demonstrates Hill's understanding of the clinical features of cerebral compression: ‘The smallest compression brought on a stupor, a low intermittent pulse, nausea, vomiting and sometimes convulsive twitches.’ From case 3 onwards he avoided dressings which compressed the trepanned area. In case 3 he again relieved the features of cerebral compression by a trepan with drainage of an EDH. In case 5 drainage of a large EDH resulted in restoration of consciousness and resolution of a right sided weakness. His account of this case also shows that he appreciated the concept that paralysis on one side of the body indicated compression on the opposite side of the brain. This patient, who crucially did not have a fracture, demonstrates Hill's appreciation that it was injury to the brain that caused symptoms rather than the fracture itself. Percival Pott (1714–1788) by contrast would only operate if a fracture were present. Hill's understanding of concepts of cerebral compression is demonstrated further by his use of the word ‘compression’ and by his recording of cerebral pulsation or tension in all but one of the operations described. Both of his patients who exhibited poor or absent cerebral pulsation had sustained primary cerebral damage and both died. Hill more than any other eighteenth century writer appreciated the importance of cerebral pulsation as an indicator of cerebral health. Further evidence of his understanding of the need to decompress where possible is shown by his use of the technique of relieving pressure by shaving off cerebral hernias caused by raised intracranial pressure, a technique he learned from the writing of Henri Francois Le Dran (1685–1770). Hill's outcomes in treating patients with head injury compares favourably with those of his contemporaries with a mortality rate of 25%, much lower than that of le Dran (57%) or Percival Pott (51%). This was the result of Hill's appreciation of the concept of cerebral compression and his better understanding of the indication for and location of the trephine. Hill's work was recognised and was cited by the influential Edinburgh physician John Abercrombie(1780–1844), the Edinburgh surgeon John Bell (1763–1820)) and the London surgeon John Abernethy (1764–1831)

== Hill’s legacy ==
James Hill died on 18 October 1776 and is buried in St Michael's churchyard in Dumfries. He advanced the understanding of the treatment of head injury by showing that epidural and subdural haematoma could be recognised from clinical features and successfully treated by trepan and surgical drainage to relieve compression. He appreciated the importance of cerebral compression and the significance of unilateral limb weakness in lateralising intracranial bleeding and determining on which side to operate. This work represented a significant advance in our understanding of the nature of brain injury following trauma and how it should be treated.
