= Jack Adams (disambiguation) =

Jack Adams (1895–1968) was a Canadian ice hockey player and coach of the Detroit Red Wings.

Jack Adams may also refer to:

== Sports ==
- Jack Adams Award, National Hockey League award for coaches
- Jack Adams (ice hockey, born 1920) (1920–1996), Canadian pro hockey player with the Montreal Canadiens
- Jack Adams (rugby union) (1986–2021), English professional rugby union player
- Jack Adams (basketball), in the American Basketball League

== Other ==
- Jack A. Adams (1922–2010), Bronze Star recipient in World War II, professor at University of Illinois Urbana-Champaign
- John Adams (mutineer) (1767–1829), known as "Jack Adams" last survivor of the Bounty mutineers
- John Adams, 1st Baron Adams (1890–1960), British trade unionist and politician, known as "Jack Adams"
- John Adams, pseudonymous writer of NEQUA or The Problem of the Ages

== See also ==
- John Adams (disambiguation)
