= Jonathan Adams =

Jonathan Adams may refer to:

- Jonathan Adams (American actor) (born 1967), American actor and voice actor
- Jonathan Adams (British actor) (1931–2005), English actor
- Jonathan Adams (architect) (born 1961), Welsh architect
- Jonathan Adams (athlete) (born 1992), Paralympic athlete from England
- Jonathan Adams (American football) (born 1999), American football player
- Jonathan Adams, American guitarist, part of the duo Montana Skies

== See also ==
- Jonathan Adam (born 1984), Scottish racing driver
- Johnny Adams (1932–1998), American blues, jazz and gospel singer
- John Adams (disambiguation)
- John Adam (disambiguation)
