= George Wallis (disambiguation) =

George Wallis (1811–1891) was a British artist, museum curator and art educator.

George Wallis may also refer to:

- George Wallis (footballer) (1910–1988), English footballer
- George C. Wallis (1871–1956), British printer, cinema manager and writer
- George Augustus Wallis (1761–1847), English painter
- George Wallis Building, university building in Wolverhampton, England

== See also ==
- George Wallace (disambiguation)
