= John Adams (minister) =

Scottish minister (1704–1757)

John Adams (c.1704–1757) was a Church of Scotland minister who served as Moderator of the General Assembly in 1744.

== Life ==
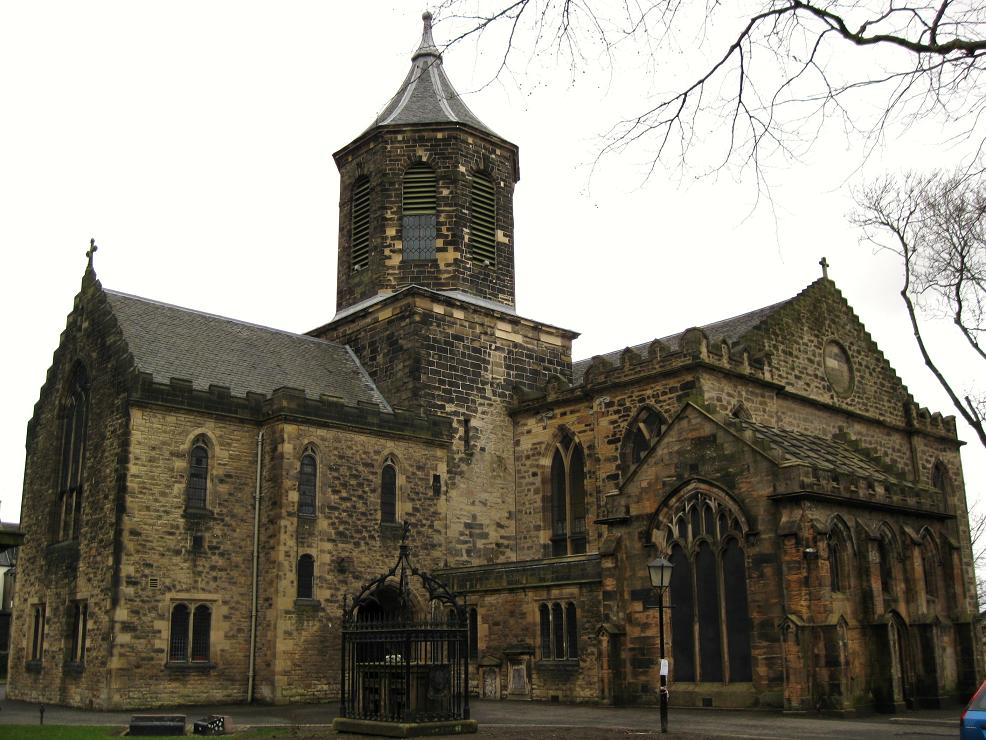
Falkirk Old Parish Church

Adams was born in Kirkoswald in Ayrshire, the son of Henry Adams (d.1719), the parish minister. He was educated locally, and then studied at Glasgow University, graduating MA in 1723. He was licensed to preach by the Presbytery of Ayr in September 1725.

In February 1726 he was ordained as minister of Dalrymple Parish Church. In November 1743 he was "called" to Falkirk Parish Church and translated to this new role in May 1744.

In the same month of 1744 he succeeded Robert Wallace as Moderator of the General Assembly of the Church of Scotland the highest position in the Scottish church. He was proposed as Moderator a second time in 1748 but lost this to Rev George Wishart.

He died on 20 March 1757.

== Family ==
He married Janet Osborne (d.1768). They had nine children.

== Publications ==
- An Inquiry into the Powers Committed to the General Assembly of this Church
- Apology at the Bar of the General Assembly on the Settlement of Torphichen
