= USS Adams =

USS Adams may refer to the following ships of the United States Navy:

- USS Adams (1799), was a 28-gun frigate launched in 1799 and active in the War of 1812 and scuttled to prevent capture in 1814.
- USS Adams (1874), was a wooden screw steamer commissioned in 1876 and decommissioned in 1919.
- USS Adams (DM-27), was a destroyer minelayer serving at the end of World War II, named for World War II aviator Lieutenant Samuel Adams

== See also ==
- USS John Adams - list of US Naval ships named for President Adams
- USS Charles F. Adams a guided missile destroyer that served during the Cold War.
- Adams, a 200-ton brig purchased during the summer of 1812 but captured by the British and renamed HMS Detroit. The Americans briefly recaptured her but had to abandon her when she grounded; she was then burnt
