= Benjamin Bell =

Scottish surgeon (1749–1806)

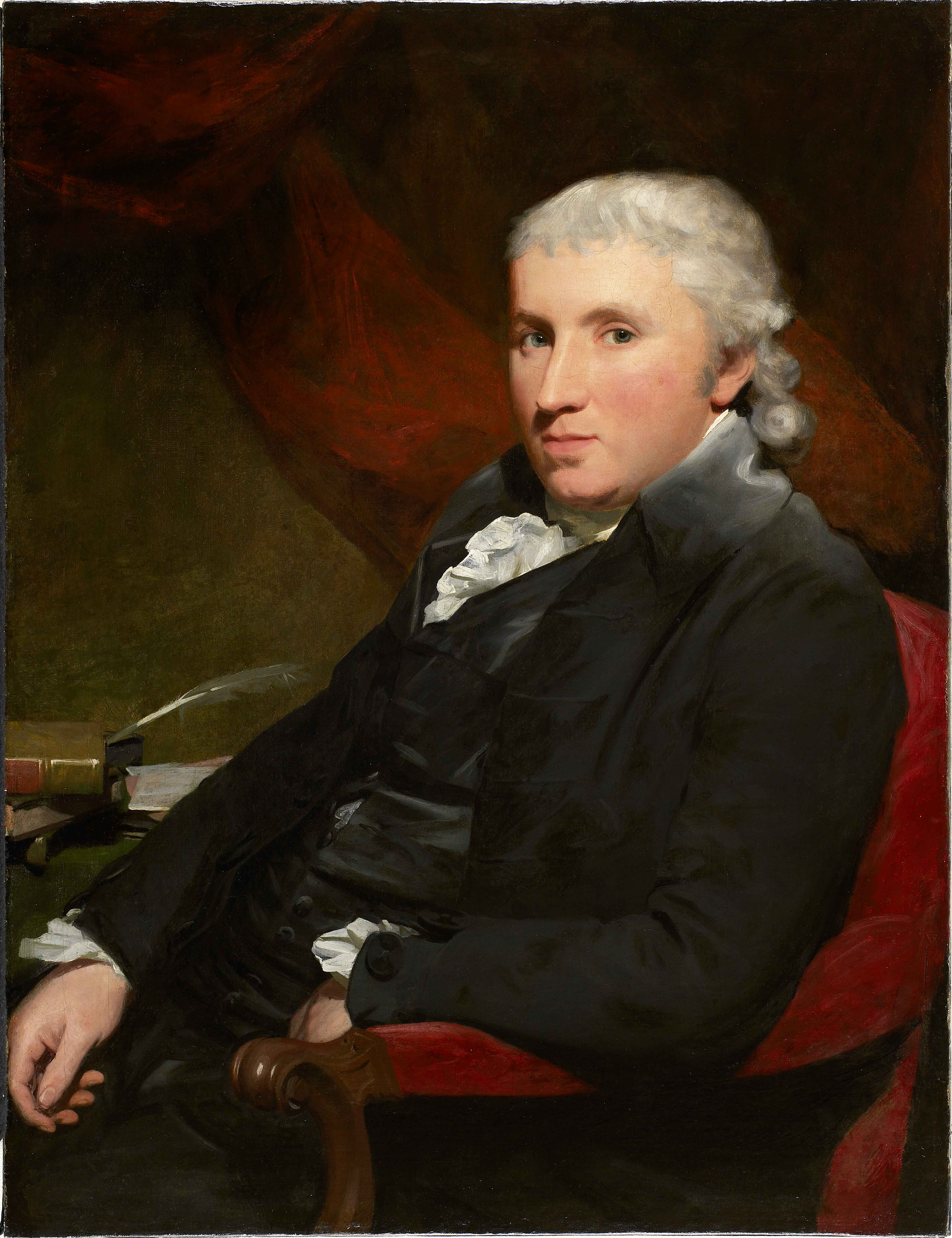
Benjamin Bell by Sir Henry Raeburn (c. 1780)

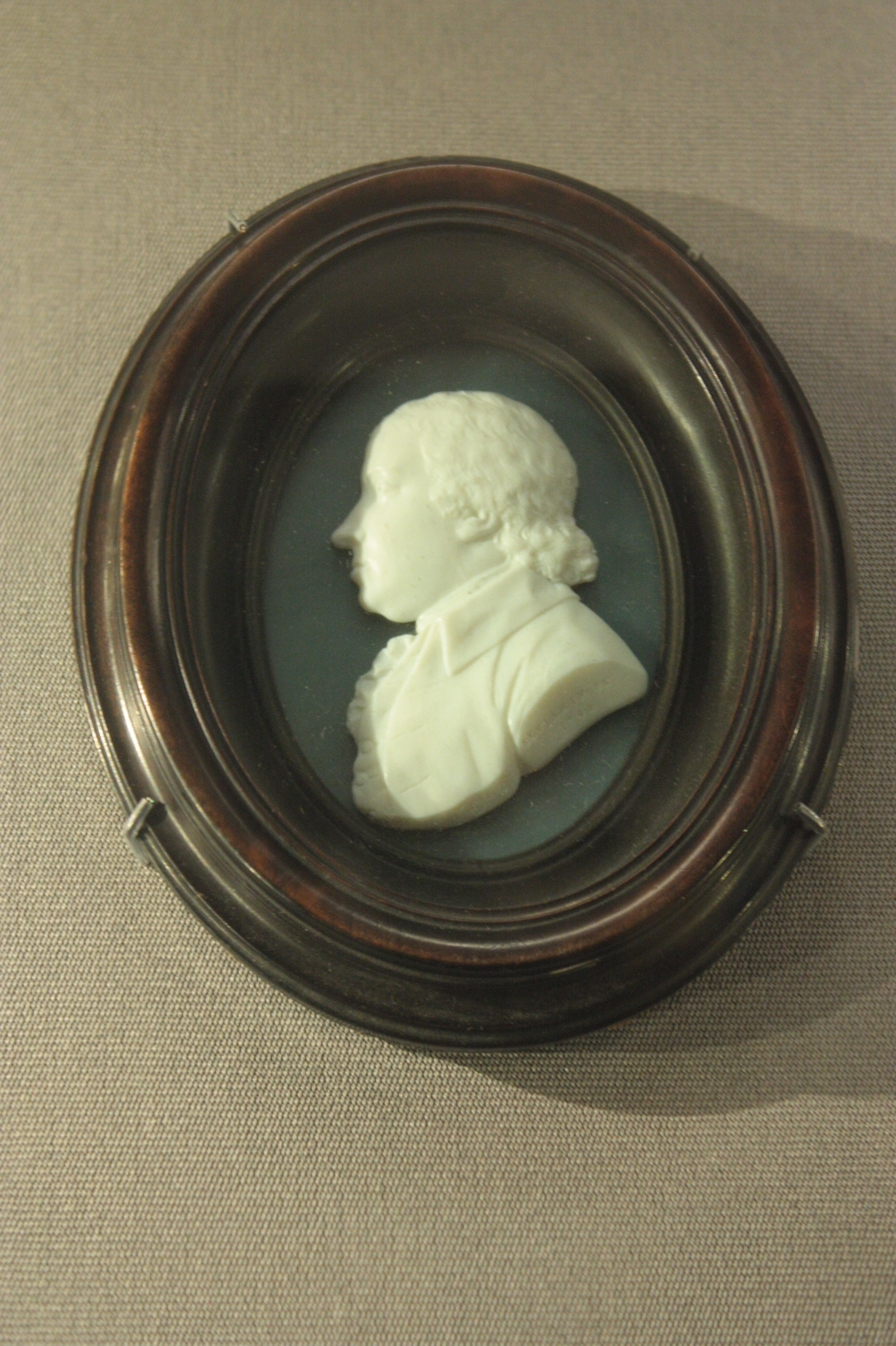
Cameo of Dr Benjamin Bell, 1792, Scottish National Portrait Gallery

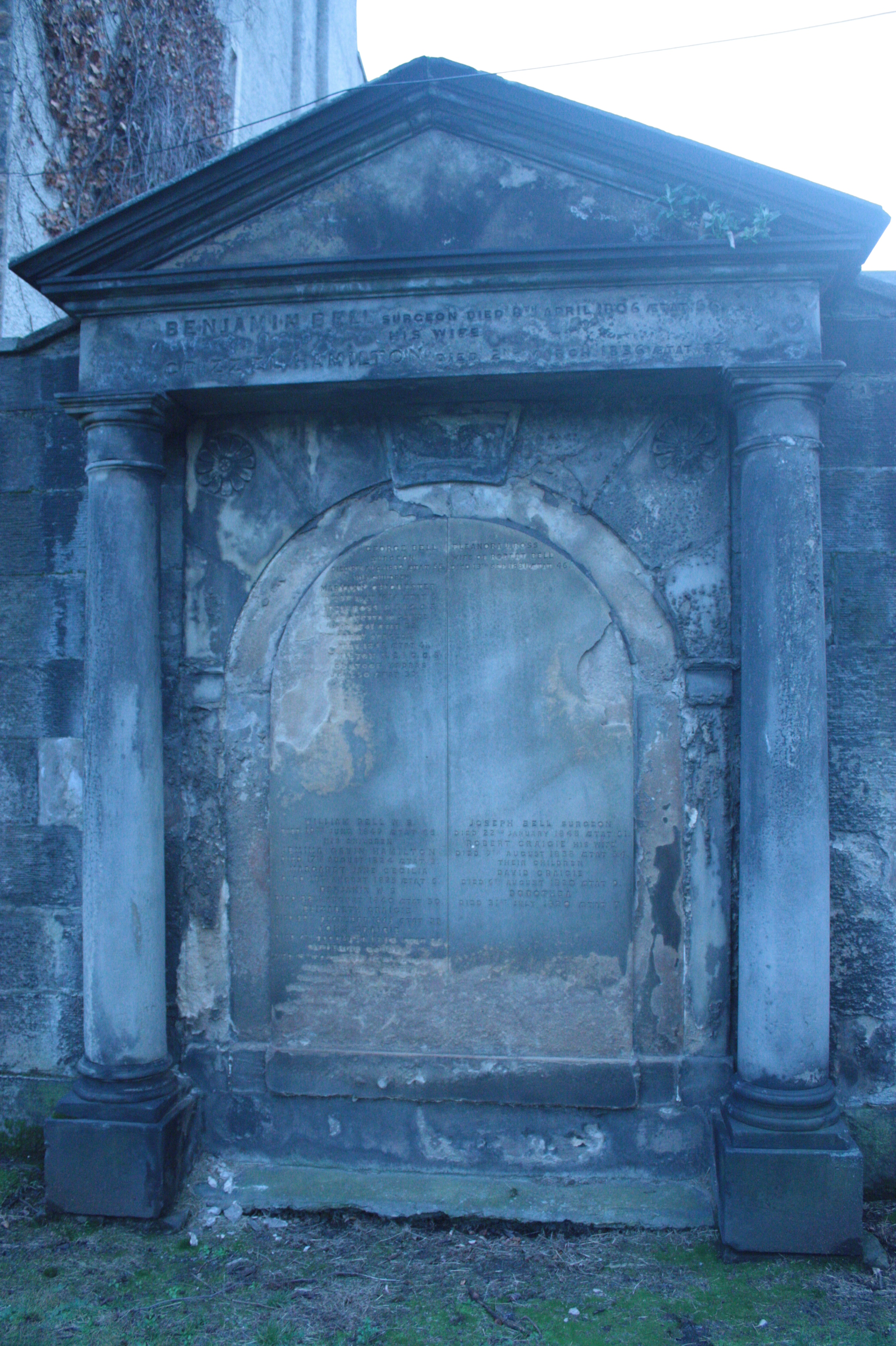
The grave of Benjamin Bell, Canongate Kirkyard, Edinburgh

Benjamin Bell of Hunthill FRSE FRCSEd (6 September 1749 – 5 April 1806) is considered to be the first Scottish scientific surgeon. He is commonly described as the father of the Edinburgh school of surgery, or the first of the Edinburgh scientific surgeons. He published medical works of significance, notably his surgical textbook A System of Surgery which became a best seller throughout Europe and in America. His treatise on venereal disease was one of the early works that suggested syphilis and gonorrhea were different diseases, a hypothesis which was not accepted by mainstream medicine until many decades later. Bell's main contribution to surgical practice was his adage 'save skin', which led to improved rates of wound healing in operations like mastectomy and limb amputation. He was also an early advocate of routine pain relief in surgery.

== Early life ==
Benjamin Bell was born in Dumfries on 6 September 1749, the eldest surviving child in a family of 15 children. His father George Bell (1722–1813) farmed at Woodhouselees, a mile south of the village of Canonbie in Dumfriesshire. In addition to farming, George Bell was involved in a series of business ventures which met with mixed success. This background of modest wealth was to prove important for Benjamin in later life, allowing him to visit surgeons in London and Paris and enabling him to take time away from his surgical practice to write a major textbook. The family tradition in agriculture was to re-emerge towards the end of his life. They owned Blackett House in Middlebie Parish (Dumfriesshire), which was later sold to fund the education of the family. Benjamin's early education was at Dumfries Grammar school.

== Surgical training ==
He became an apprentice to James Hill (1703-1776), a surgeon in Dumfries, before moving to Edinburgh in 1766 to study medicine at Edinburgh University under the tutelage of some of the most inspiring medical teachers of the day, including Alexander Monro secundus (1733–1817) the anatomist, Joseph Black (1728–99) the chemist and John Hope (1725–86) the botanist. In November 1767 he was appointed dresser in the surgical wards of the Edinburgh Royal Infirmary, and surgeons' clerk 2 years later.

He visited London and Paris, writing to his father that had he been planning a career as a physician he would have been happy to stay in Edinburgh, "but for a surgeon I assure you Edinburgh comes greatly short of either Paris or London and for that reason Dr. Monro and any others that I have spoken to here upon the subject approve of the scheme [the Paris visit] very much".

In 1770 after passing the necessary examinations, he was elected a freeman surgeon-apothecary of the Incorporation of Surgeons of Edinburgh later the Royal College of Surgeons of Edinburgh.

In 1772 Bell was in London from where he wrote to Dr. Cullen thanking him for his letter of introduction to John Hunter (1728–1793) whom he described as "the most agreeable and at the same time the most useful acquaintance I ever met with." He also visited and observed the London surgeon Percivall Pott (1714–1788) to whom he would later dedicate his treatise on ulcers. Bell's interest in science is evident from his description of a lecture which he attended at the Royal Society given by Joseph Priestley. Priestley's suggestion that atmospheric air contained fixed air (carbon dioxide) and dephlogisticated air (oxygen) clearly made an impression on Bell who noted from the lecture that "air can be spoiled by one or more animals breathing it in a confined space and become unfit for purposes of life"

== Practice ==
On return to Edinburgh he set up in surgical practice and within a year, at the age of 24, was elected one of four attendant surgeons to the Royal Infirmary of Edinburgh. Surgeons attended in rotation and Bell managed to remain a surgeon to the Infirmary for eighteen years, an unusually long period. This may have been because of his lifelong friendship with James Gregory, the Professor of Physic, and the most influential member of the Infirmary Board of Management. In 1800 there was pressure from younger members of the Royal College of Surgeons to change the system of appointment of surgeons to the Infirmary, making shorter appointments so that more junior surgeons might gain Infirmary experience. At that time, now well established in practice, Bell was content to step down, but he wrote to the College setting out the case for 'permanent appointments' to the Infirmary rotation, a view which had been also promoted by Gregory. Of the 23 members of the Royal College of Surgeons asked to vote on the matter, not one supported Bell's proposal. John Bell (1763–1820), a successful teacher of anatomy in his own extramural school and an accomplished Edinburgh surgeon (but not related to Benjamin Bell), failed to gain appointment to the Infirmary rota, and began to campaign against what he saw as the injustice of the rota system. As part of this he wrote criticising Gregory's views, and this brought the Bells, Benjamin and John into conflict. This feud was at the heart of much of the criticism to which Benjamin Bell was subjected by his namesake.

In 1773 Bell was a founding member of the Aesculapian Club. In 1775 Bell fell from horseback and sustained injuries that were to force him to take a rest from surgical practice for some two years. This rest was to prove fortuitous, for it allowed him time to reflect and to write, and his relatively wealthy background enabled him to do this without financial concerns. To further develop his interest in farming during this period of recuperation, he took the lease of Liberton Farm situated some two miles south of the centre of Edinburgh.

Returning to what was to prove a highly successful career as a surgeon in Edinburgh, Bell went into practice with James Gibson (died 1815) who was to become president of the Royal College of Surgeons of Edinburgh in 1778–79. Later he formed another surgical partnership with James Russell (1754–1836) and Andrew Wardrop (died 1823). Bell, Wardop and Russell became the leading surgical practice in Scotland with a wide referral base. Wardrop reckoned Bell "… was a successful operator and during many years was more employed than any surgeon in Scotland". A fellow surgeon John Campbell, who had been apprenticed to Bell, went so far as to suggest that "…no one could die contented without having consulted Benjamin Bell."

On 12 April 1782 Bell was one of the founding members of the Harveian Society of Edinburgh and served as President in 1792. On 17 November 1783 he was one of the founding Fellows of the Royal Society of Edinburgh.

He died at Newington House in south Edinburgh. He is buried with other family members, including his wife Grizzel Hamilton, in the south-east corner of Canongate Churchyard in Edinburgh.

== Bell's contributions to surgery ==
Benjamin Bell is considered by many to have been the first Scottish scientific surgeon. This reputation was based largely on his influential textbook A System of Surgery. He can be regarded as a 'scientific' surgeon because of his rational thought processes which are apparent in his treatises, particularly his Treatise on Gonorrhoea virulenta and Lues venerea (1793). Another treatise, The Theory and Management of Ulcers, was first published in 1778 and is still considered one of the classics of 18th-century physiology.

== A System of Surgery ==
The System appeared in six volumes between 1783 and 1788. By 1801 no fewer than seven editions had been published, and it went on to Italian, French, Spanish, German and three American editions. It was popular because it was comprehensive; made use of up-to-date published material from all over Europe, and because of Bell's reputation as a surgeon. Bell was an advocate of the routine use of opium to relieve post-operative pain, stating "to be able to alleviate the misery of those who are obliged to submit to dangerous operations must afford the biggest gratification to every practitioner." Bell also credited his fellow Scot, James Moore, with developing a clamp to produce nerve compression in the arm or leg to provide analgesia for amputation.

== Farming ==
Bell's family background was in farming, and, during his two-year break from surgery after his accident in 1775, he rented Liberton farm two miles from central Edinburgh, and his interest in the subject was revived. He frequently wrote to his father for agricultural advice.

== Property dealings ==
Bell bought the lands of Newington in South Edinburgh in 1803 and was responsible for the development of the area. He built Newington House for himself just before his death. Although this house was demolished in 1966, the streets around where it lay include Blacket Avenue and Middleby Street named after the Dumfriesshire localities of Bell's youth. His son, George Bell FRSE (1777–1832) commissioned architect James Gillespie Graham (1776–1855) to prepare plans for housing and the subdivision of the land into plots.

== Family ==
Prior to marriage he lived as Gosford Close on the Royal Mile.

Bell married Grizel Hamilton, daughter of the Very Rev Prof Robert Hamilton FRSE (1707–1787), in 1774. After marriage he moved to a handsome house on Old Assembly Close. They had several sons who rose to prominence in Edinburgh society: George Bell FRSE (1777–1832), Robert Bell FRSE (1782–1861), William Bell FRSE (1783–1849)

== Dynasty ==
Bell was the progenitor of one of the great Edinburgh surgical dynasties. His son Joseph, grandson Benjamin and great-grandson Joseph (1837–1911) were all surgeons in Edinburgh, and all became presidents of the Royal College of Surgeons of Edinburgh. His son George Bell (1777-1832) was the official surgeon to H.M. King George IV when visiting Scotland in 1822. His great-grandson Joseph Bell (1837–1911), was known for his diagnostic abilities, which depended on his ability to observe minute details. This inspired a young Edinburgh medical student Arthur Conan Doyle (1859–1930) to base the fictional detective Sherlock Holmes on Joseph Bell.
