= Cyrus Field Adams =

American Republican civil rights activist and author

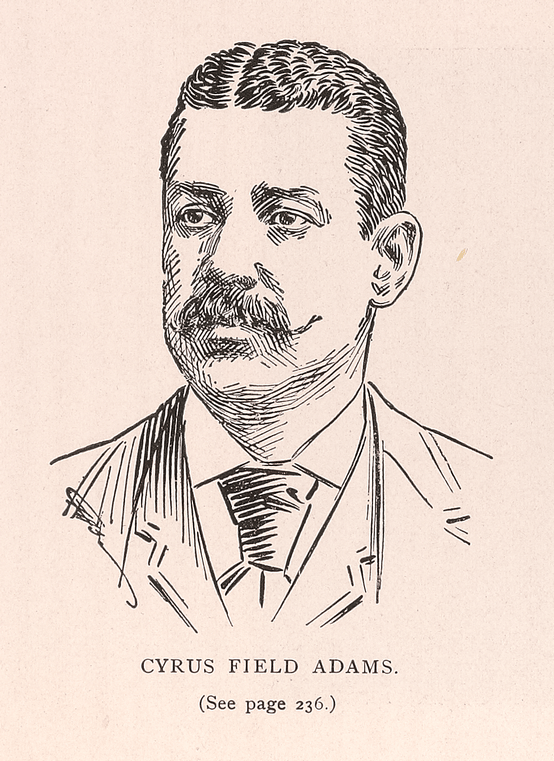
- Image of Adams from September 1900 issue of The Afro-American Council
- Born: July 18, 1858; Louisville, Kentucky, U.S.
- Died: February 18, 1942 (aged 83); Manitoba, Canada
- Occupations: Activist, author, teacher, newspaper manager, businessman
- Father: Henry Adams
- Relatives: J.Q. Adams (brother), Joseph Carter Corbin (uncle)

Cyrus Field Adams (July 18, 1858 – February 18, 1942), was an American civil rights activist, writer, teacher, newspaper manager, and businessman.

== Background ==
Adams was born on July 18, 1858, in Louisville, Kentucky. He was one of five children to Henry Adams and Margaret P. Corbin Adams. His father was a minister of First Baptist churches in Louisville where he worked to establish the first black Baptist churches and taught educational services in church. He was a chairman of the General Association of Colored Baptists.

Cyrus worked with one of his two brothers, John Quincy Adams, in managing his first of many newspapers called Bulletin in Louisville from 1879 to 1885. He served as president of the Washington Philatelic Society and wrote his book, The National Afro-American Council of which he was secretary of that Council. He was appointed to the job of Assistant Register of the United States Treasury by President Theodore Roosevelt.

== Career ==
In his teens, Adams became a teacher in Louisville, Kentucky in a colored public school and an editor in The Bulletin, a newspaper in appeal to the colored race. In his editorials, he expressed strong defense against the white race and was rejected a teaching job the following school year. This raised controversy of him "masquerading as a white man". Although, he spent his life working to elevate the African American race. He became the first life member of the "National Negro Business League".

Adams left Kentucky to live temporarily in cities including Washington D.C., Chicago and St. Paul Minnesota. Chicago was the main foundation for his career as a newspaper publisher and teacher. He resided at 2974 Dearborn Street. He worked with his brother, J.Q. Adams as manager and head editor for The Appeal newspaper in Chicago. This company ran as the most popular African-American read newspaper in Chicago in the late 19th century. While being editor in chief and manager of The Appeal, Adams was also a teacher in Chicago. He was fluent in German and offered courses over content in speaking, reading and writing German Deutsch in 1888 for six weeks at a time. The class would meet for four hours in a day and five days during the week. Once reached the end of the course, Professor Adams would hold a presentation at Lincoln Hall. However, during his time in Chicago, in 1913 his earnings declined drastically and The Appeal shut down. He also provided his teaching services in Washington D.C. in 1887. Adams contributed to the Civil Rights Movement through his multiple newspapers speaking out against preconceptions and racism of the African American community. His attributions to the movement involved his many articles and books he published documenting civil rights organizations and important African American activists. He wrote The National Afro-American Council about the National Afro-American Council and the articles "Col. William Pledger" and "George L. Knox" published in the Colored American Magazine in 1902. He wrote a book called The Republican Party and the Afro-American: a book of facts and figures in 1912.

== Political contributions ==
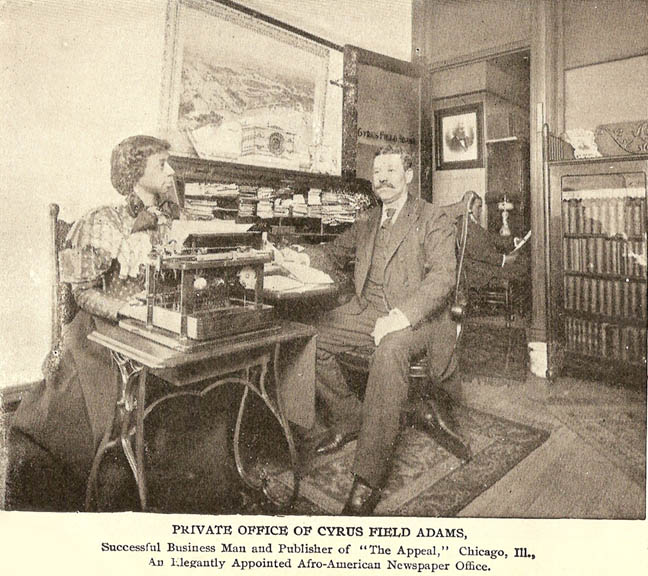
Adams in his private office at The Appeal, circa late 1890s

Adams fought a key battle in civil rights for African Americans. He used his variety of positions through his life, whether that be working for the newspaper, teacher, or working for the treasurer to advocate for civil rights. In his later life after being appointed by Theodore Roosevelt to be the assistant register at the United States Treasury, he used this platform to write a book titled, The National Afro-American Council, Organized 1898: a history etc. In 1912, Adams decided to leave his position at the Treasury and join President Taft's re-election campaign as asked to do so by Taft himself. This was an attempt to get Adams out of the treasury position as Taft had promised that position to another African American man who supported Taft. Taft lost this election and President Wilson took over, he replaced every republican that had worked for Taft including Adams. In the years to follow, an investigation was launched regarding the time Adams spent as treasury to try and discredit his career. He was accused of having improper relations with a white woman at his time working for the Treasury but these accusations seemed to fall through as it did not affect his career.

== Late life ==
Adams spent the remainder of his life and career traveling the world, he applied for a U.S. passport in 1914 and continued to travel the world until 1931. He permanently resided in Chicago, Illinois at this time and later died in Manitoba on February 18, 1942.

== Writings ==
- The National Afro-American Council, organized 1898, A history, etc. Cyrus F. Adams, Washington D.C. (1902)
- The Republican Party and the Afro-American: a book of facts and figures (1912)
