= Faith Petric =

American folk musician (1915–2013)

- Born: September 13, 1915; Orofino, Idaho
- Died: October 24, 2013 (aged 98) San Francisco, California
- Genres: Folk music
- Instruments: guitar, vocals
- Labels: Bay Records, Center Records

Faith Petric (September 13, 1915–October 24, 2013) was an American folk singer and activist. She was head of the San Francisco Folk Music Club for 50 years and was remembered by SF Gate as "a central figure of the San Francisco folk music scene."

== Early life and career ==
Petric was born on September 13, 1915, in a log cabin near Orofino, Idaho. Her father, a Methodist minister, taught her and her three siblings how to sing hymns. The family had an old pump organ at home, and they would sing popular western songs together. Petric's parents divorced while she was a teenager and she was subsequently sent to live in a boardinghouse. She later attended Whitman College in Walla Walla, Washington, where she graduated in 1937. After graduating, she moved to San Francisco, taking on various jobs. In 1945, she moved to Mexico, where she gave birth to her daughter Carole. She was briefly married during this period. She joined the peace movement and later lent her voice to various causes, joining the Selma to Montgomery marches and defending a gay couple that moved into her neighborhood.

Petric learned to play the guitar in the 1930s, during the Great Depression. During World War II, Petric was a "Rosie the Riveter", building Liberty ships in New Jersey. In 1962, Petric became the head of the San Francisco Folk Music Club and began hosting the popular jam sessions in Haight-Ashbury. She retired from her job at the California State Department of Rehabilitation in 1970, after her daughter finished college, to focus on music full-time. She co-founded the Portable Folk Festival along with other members of the group, including Jon Adams, Jon Wilcox, Larry Hanks, Sunny Goodier, and the Sweets Mill String Band. The group traveled around North America in an old school bus performing at numerous folk festivals. They performed at the Mariposa Folk Festival, Toronto's Centre Island, in 1971. She toured the world, playing various clubs, theaters and protest marches. Petric was involved with Spanish Civil War refugees, anti-fascism committees, worked for racial equality, and was a political target during the McCarthy Era. She was also a member of the Industrial Workers of the World (IWW) and performed under the label of the union's Entertainment Workers' Industrial Union No. 630.

Friends of Petric have described her as the "Fort Knox of folk music," for her ability to recall the lyrics of thousands of songs. Petric wrote a regular column for Sing Out! magazine. In a 2011 interview, Petric noted that, "Just because you are old doesn't mean the creativity goes away," planning to sing for as long as she was able.

== Death ==
On October 24, 2013, Petric died of natural causes at the age of 98.

In 2014, The New Old Time Chautauqua did a tour in Petric's honor, dubbing it the "Keep the Faith" tour. The tour included Petric's birthplace, Orofino, Idaho. At the 2014 San Francisco Free Folk Festival, one of the performance areas was named after her.

== Discography ==
Studio albums

- Faith Petric (Bay 216, 1979)
- Womanchild (Center 003)
- As We Were (Center 37)
- "When Did We Have Sauerkraut?" (A Collection Of Extraordinary And Outrageous Songs) (Center 105)

Compilation album

- Faith's Favorites (Center 104, 1997)
