= The Appeal (newspaper) =

Newspaper published in Saint Paul, Minnesota

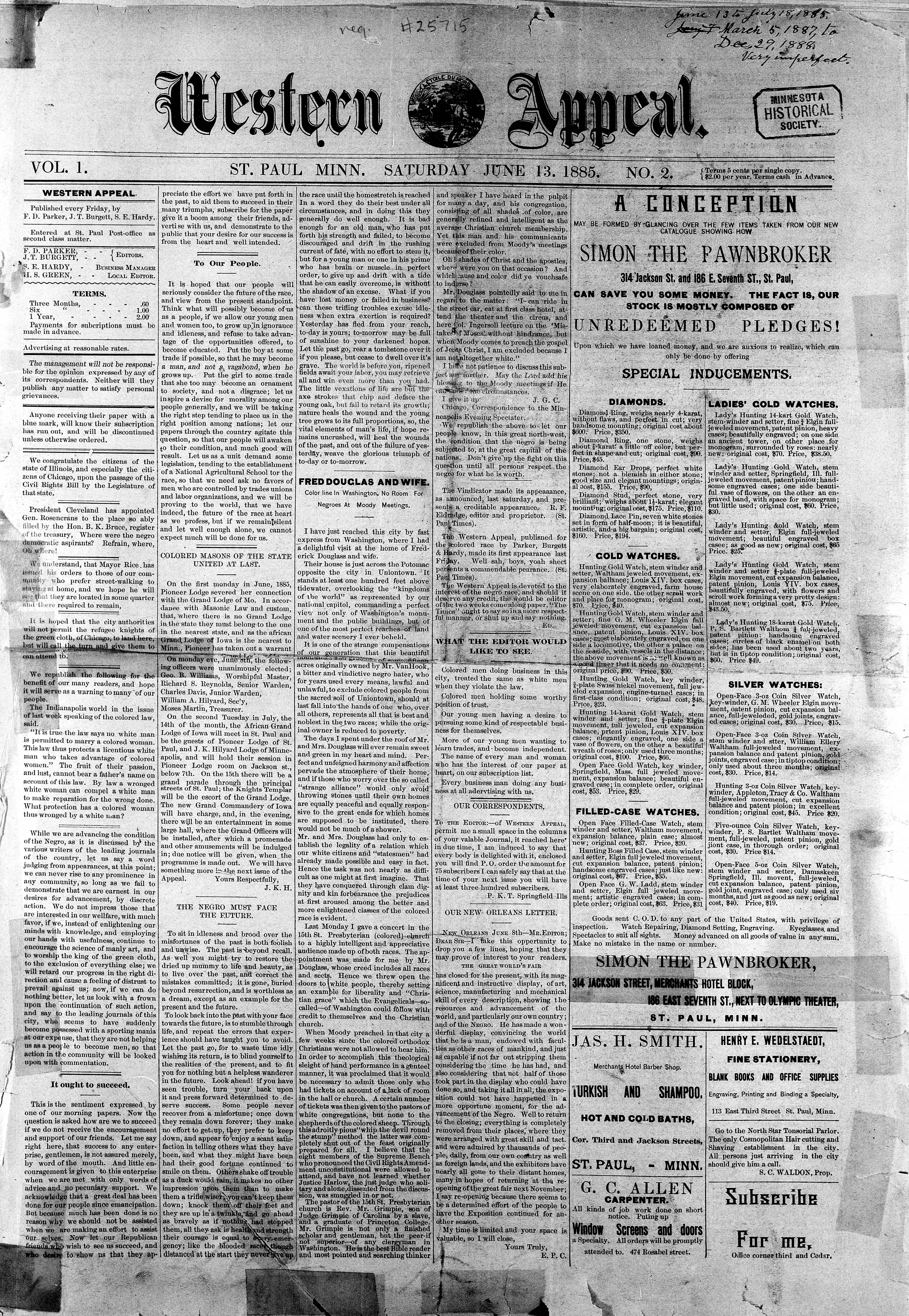
- June 13, 1885 front page of Western Appeal
- Type: Weekly newspaper
- Format: Broadsheet
- Founder(s): Samuel E. Hardy; John T. Burgett; Frederick Douglass Parker
- Publisher: Parker Burgett & Hardy Publishing Company
- Editor: Frederick Douglass Parker; John Quincy Adams; Roy Wilkins
- Founded: June 5, 1885
- Ceased publication: 1923
- Political alignment: Republican
- Language: English
- Headquarters: St. Paul, Minnesota
- ISSN: 2163-7083
- OCLC number: 10153837

The Appeal (originally the Western Appeal) was a weekly newspaper published from 1885 to 1923. It was one of the most successful African American newspapers of the late nineteenth and early twentieth centuries. Founded in St. Paul, Minnesota, it was published in six separate editions in cities across the United States at the height of its popularity. In 1889 the newspaper changed its name to The Appeal to reflect its expanded geographic scope.

== History ==
=== Background and foundation ===
In 1885 there were less than 1500 African-American residents in the Minneapolis–Saint Paul area. African-American newspapers were common at the time, but few of them lasted longer than a year, since they were started for cultural purposes more than commercial ones. There had been many previous African-American newspapers in St. Paul, including one printed in 1876 also named the Western Appeal. It had no affiliation with the paper established in 1885.

The Western Appeal was first published on June 5, 1885, in St. Paul, Minnesota. It was started by Samuel E. Hardy and John T. Burgett with Frederick Douglass Parker, who also served as the newspaper's first editor. It was a weekly paper, with an edition each Friday containing news, editorials, advertisements, and a literary page. Subscription rates were affordable, only two dollars a year, but the paper was already struggling financially by the end of 1886.

=== Early years ===
In December 1886, Parker resigned as editor and a new management team took over. Prominent St. Paul businessmen Thomas H. Lyles and James Kidd Hilyard led the team and put their own money into the paper to save it. In February 1887, the team reorganized under the name Northwestern Printing Company. It provided job order printing services in addition to publishing the Western Appeal, which kept the paper afloat financially over the long term.

Lyles and Hilyard initially convinced Parker to return to the Western Appeal as editor. But by January 1887, Parker had resigned again to take another position. Lyles and Hilyard then promoted associate editor John Quincy Adams to editor. Adams had been editor of a similar newspaper, the Bulletin, in Louisville, Kentucky. He had moved to St. Paul in 1886 at the request of Lyles and Hilyard to work at the Western Appeal. With his promotion, Adams became the driving force behind the newspaper.

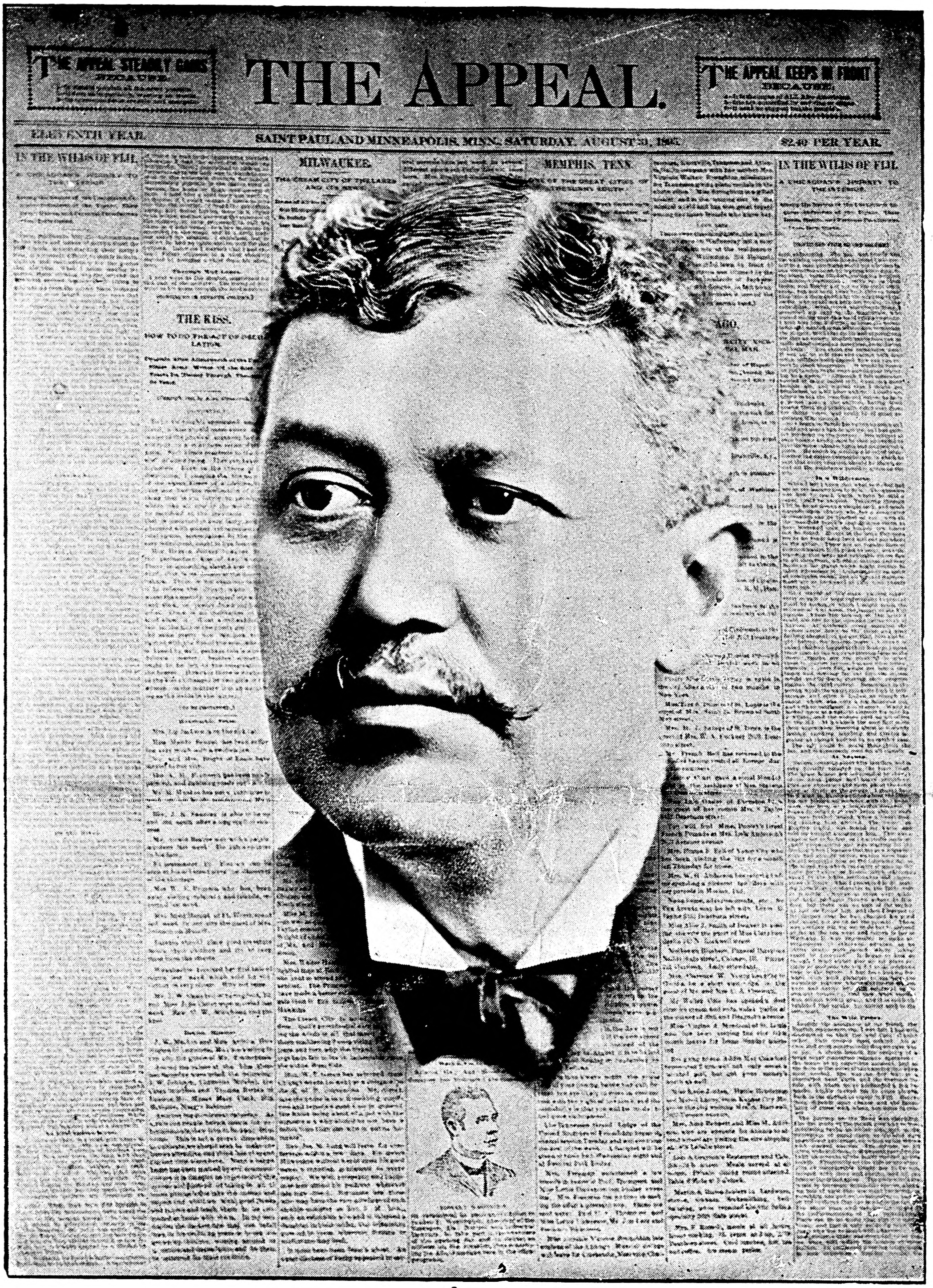
Editor John Quincy "J. Q." Adams

Adams was an influential writer and a staunch Republican, and like other editors of his day, he expressed his opinions through his paper's editorial page. The Western Appeal even received funding directly from the Republican Party, another common practice for newspapers of the time.

=== Expansion and name change ===
In January 1888, Adams opened a regional office for the paper in Chicago. His brother, Cyrus Field Adams, ran it. This brought the Western Appeal to even more readers. Other regional offices followed: Louisville in August 1888, St. Louis in April 1889, Dallas in August 1892, and Washington, D.C. in March 1901. Each Saturday, each of these offices published an edition of the newspaper. Each edition had the same national news, feature articles, and editorials, but carried its own local and social news. The word "Western" was dropped from the paper's name in 1889, to reflect its national reach. By this time, Adams owned The Appeal outright and supervised both its business and editorial sides.

Like other papers of its time, The Appeal served as a community organizer. It was a place for African Americans to express their frustrations, find common ground, and call for action. After 1900, with the growth of African-American civil rights organizations such as the National Association for the Advancement of Colored People (NAACP) and the Urban League, the influence and importance of newspapers like The Appeal began to decline.

=== Later years ===
As the twentieth century progressed, The Appeal slowly got smaller and closed its regional offices. Its last regional office, Chicago, closed in 1913. The Appeal continued publication in St. Paul, and Adams remained its editor until his death on September 3, 1922. Adams's son, John Jr, took over The Appeal and hired a young graduate student, Roy Wilkins, as editor in April 1923. The newspaper struggled, however, and it was sold to a competitor, the Northwestern Bulletin, later that year. The two papers were merged and published as the Northwestern Bulletin-Appeal for several years, until that company went out of business in 1925.
