= Robert Wallace (minister) =

Scottish minister and economist (1697–1771)

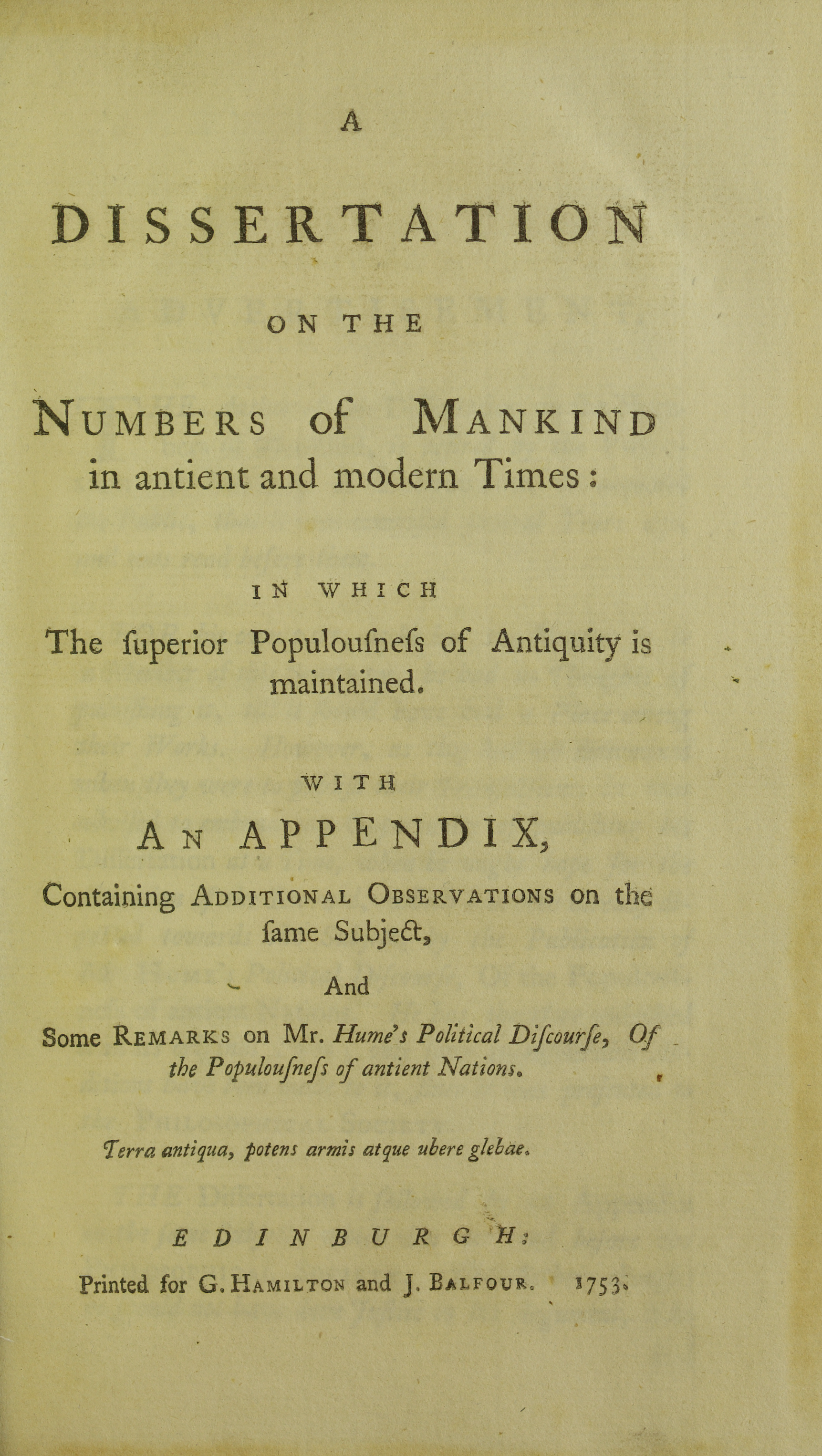
Dissertation on the numbers of mankind in antient and modern times, 1753

Robert Wallace (7 January 1697 – 29 July 1771) was a minister of the Church of Scotland and writer on population.

== Life ==
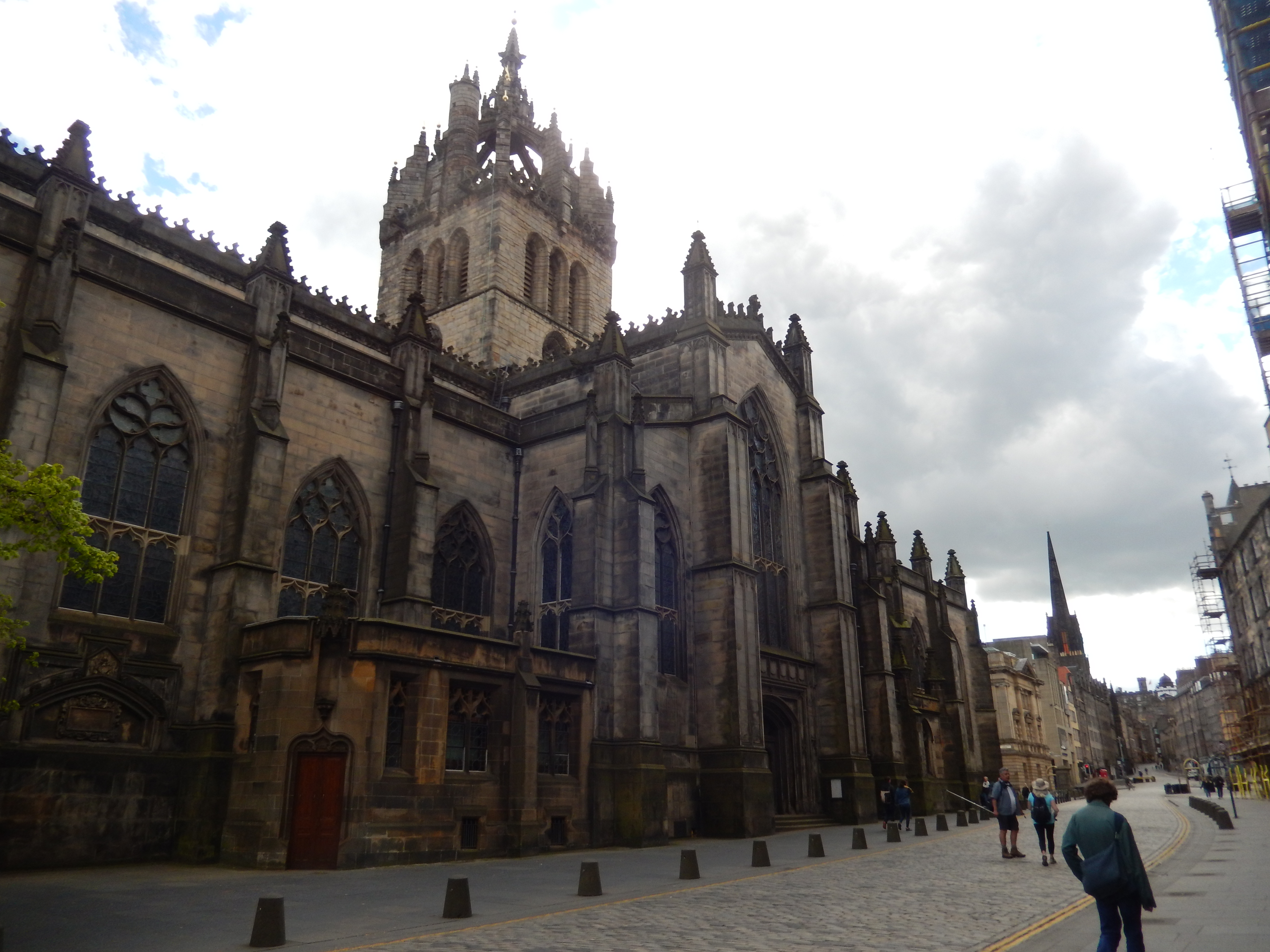
The New North was one of four parishes contained within St. Giles' Cathedral

He was the only son of Margaret Stewart, wife of Rev Matthew Wallace, the parish minister of Kincardine-in-Menteith (west of Stirling), where he was born on 7 January 1697. Educated at Stirling grammar school, he then attended the University of Edinburgh in 1711, and acted for a time (1720) as assistant to James Gregory, the University professor of mathematics. He was one of the founders of the Rankenian Club in 1717.

On 31 July 1722, Wallace was licensed as a preacher by the presbytery of Dunblane, Perthshire, and he was presented by the Marquis of Annandale to the parish of Moffat, Dumfriesshire, in August 1723. In 1733, he became minister of New Greyfriars, Edinburgh. He offended the government of 1736 by declining to read from his pulpit the proclamation against the Porteous rioters. On 30 August 1738, he was translated to the New North (St Giles). In 1742, on a change of ministry at Westminster, he regained influence, and was entrusted for five years with the management of church business and the distribution of ecclesiastical patronage. From a suggestion of John Mathison of the High Kirk, St Giles, Wallace, togerther with Alexander Webster of the Tolbooth St Giles, developed the Ministers' Widows' Fund.

On 12 May 1743, Wallace was elected Moderator of the General Assembly of the Church of Scotland. The Assembly approved the Widows' Fund. scheme, and at the end of the year he submitted it in London to Robert Craigie, the Lord Advocate, who saw it into legislation as the Ministers' Widows Fund (Scotland) Act 1743 (17 Geo. 2. c. 11).

In June 1744, Wallace was appointed a Chaplain in Ordinary to King George II in Scotland and Dean of the Chapel Royal. He received the honorary degree of D.D. from the University of Edinburgh on 13 March 1759, and died on 29 July 1771. His position at New Church, St Giles was filled by Rev William Gloag.

== Works ==
Wallace published in 1753 a Dissertation on the Numbers of Mankind in Ancient and Modern Times. It contained criticism of the chapter on the Populousness of Ancient Nations in David Hume's Political Discourses. The work was translated into French under the supervision of Montesquieu, and it was republished in an English edition with a memoir in 1809. In 1758 appeared Wallace's Characteristics of the Present State of Great Britain. In Various Prospects of Mankind, Nature, and Providence (1761), he recurred to his population theories, and was believed (by William Hazlitt and Thomas Noon Talfourd) to have influenced Thomas Malthus.

== Family ==
In October 1726, Wallace married Helen Turnbull, daughter of Rev George Turnbull, minister of Tyninghame in East Lothian. She died on 9 February 1776, leaving two sons. All three of their children died unmarried:

- Rev Dr Matthew Wallace DD, vicar of Tenterden in Kent
- George Wallace (1727-1805), known as an advocate and writer
- Elizabeth

== Notes ==
Attribution

This article incorporates text from a publication now in the public domain: Lee, Sidney, ed. (1899). "Wallace, Robert (1697-1771)". Dictionary of National Biography. Vol. 59. London: Smith, Elder & Co.
