= John Adam (silversmith) =

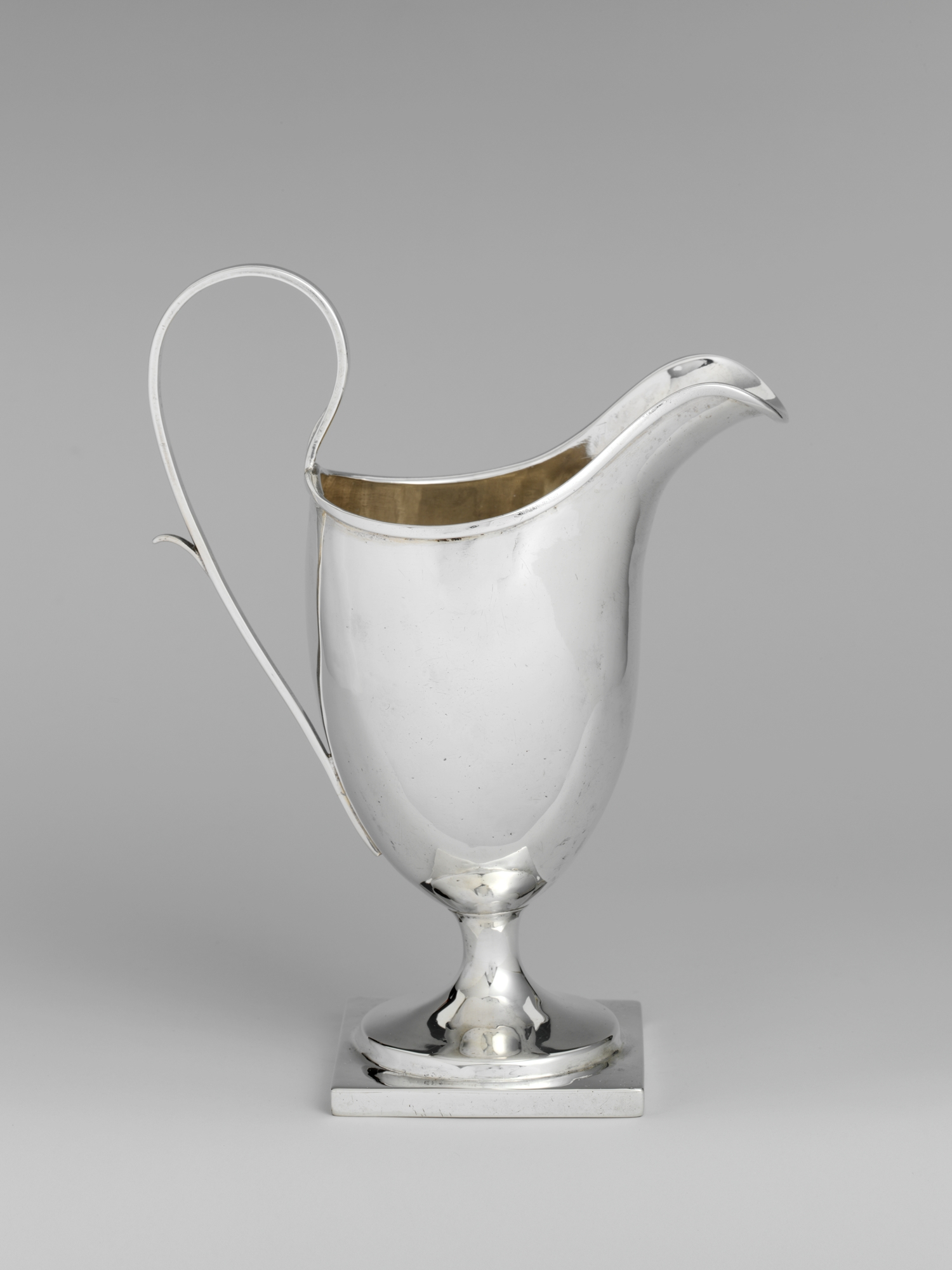
Creamer by John Adam in the Metropolitan Museum of Art

John Adam (August 1, 1774 - August 4, 1848) was a silversmith in Alexandria, Virginia.

Adam was born in Alexandria, Virginia, and probably learned silversmithing from his father, James Adam. He appears to have worked for Burnett & Ridgen in Georgetown (Washington, D.C.), circa 1801. At that time, Thomas Bruff gave demonstrations of his patented spoon manufacturing device, and his advertisements included testimonials from Adam and other silversmiths. Adam's testimonial read as follows:

Certificate of Mr. Adam, // of George-town, Potomack // September 18, 1801 // I certify that I have tried Mr. Bruff's spoon machine, and have proved by the watch, that the advantage gained by the machine in working spoons from the bar to the punch, is 25 to one faster than with the hammer, the machine turning out one in a minute, with the name and heel impressed; that the bars are sooner prepared; and that the whole difference, finishing included, is nearly three to one. I further certify, that the spoons need no preparation for the burnisher except the edge, consequently almost all the loss of filings, scrapings and stonings is saved. JOHN ADAM

On 28 July 28, 1803, Adam married Mary Hayes. His first business advertisement was published on November 18, 1803, as a gold- and silversmith. His workshop was on King Street, Alexandria, near Royal. Over the decades, he changed addresses several times, and bought additional property. His advertisements described himself as a silversmith, and sometimes as a jeweler; he also repaired silver and jewelry items and sold silverware as typical for silversmith shops. His apprentices and journeymen are unrecorded, but 1810 and 1812 property tax lists count three males over sixteen and two under sixteen in his household, which may include two journeyman and one apprentice in addition to Adam and his son. In addition, Adam was an amateur oil painter, and said to be a friend of Thomas Sully. Several paintings attributed to Adam still survive. His business appeared to be prosperous and well-managed, as after his death, he left an estate worth $20,000 to $25,000.

Adam died August 4, 1848, and was buried in the First Presbyterian Church Cemetery in Alexandria.
