= Jon Adams (musician) =

American folk musician

- Born: 1939 (age 85–86); Berkeley, California
- Genres: Contemporary folk music, Old Time
- Occupation: Musician
- Instrument: guitar
- Years active: 1965–present

Jon Adams is an American folk musician active in the coffee house circuit in the 1960s. He was born in Berkeley, California in 1939. His mother was from Oregon and his father was a Methodist minister.

Adams frequently played coffee houses and folk festivals in California, especially in Berkeley and San Jose and in Portland, Oregon through the 1960s and early 1970s. For example, he performed at the Jabberwock coffee house in Berkeley a number of times in the 1960s and appeared at the Heritage Coffee House in a "Hoot" featuring performers from the San Diego Folk Festival in 1971. He performed alongside musicians such as Cal Scott. He performed at other festivals, including the Mariposa Folk Festival. Adams was also a member of the Portable Folk Festival, a collective of folk musicians who traveled North America in a school bus in 1971, frequently appearing at folk festivals. Members of the group continue to meet up in California. Other members of the Portable Folk Festival included: Faith Petric, Larry Hanks, Jim Ringer, the Sweet's Mill String Band, and Jon Wilcox. He spent time at Sweet's Mill Music Camp in Northern California. He remains active in the West Coast folk scene where he plays music festivals and is known for leading song as well as finger-style guitar playing. Adams is also active as a teacher and mentor with performers such as Pat O'Neil citing him as an early influence.
