= John Adams (educational writer) =

Scottish compiler of books for young readers

John Adams (1750? – 1814) was a Scottish compiler of books for young readers.

== Biography ==
Adams was born in Aberdeen about 1750. Having graduated from the university there, he obtained a preaching license, and coming to London was appointed minister of the Scotch church in Hatton Garden. Subsequently he opened a school or academy at Putney, which proved very successful; the botanists Allan Cunningham and his brother Richard were pupils. He died at Putney in 1814.

Most of his numerous works passed through many editions, and were largely used in schools. Among them may be mentioned:

1. The Flowers of Ancient History, 1788
2. Elegant Anecdotes and Bon Mots,’ 1790
3. A View of Universal History (3 vols.), 1795, which includes a brief account of almost every country in the world down to the date of publication.
4. The Flowers of Modern History, 1796.
5. The Flowers of Modern Travels, 1797.
6. Curious Thoughts on the History of Man, 1799.

Adams also published by subscription a volume of sermons dedicated to Lord Grantham in 1805, and he was the author of a very popular Latin schoolbook, entitled Lectiones Selectæ, which reached an eleventh edition in 1823.
