= The Rankenian Club =

The Rankenian Club was an 18th-century society of intellectuals, founded in 1716 or earlier and disbanded some time after 1760.

It is regarded as the most important of the many learned clubs and societies which were an important feature of the Scottish Enlightenment. The Scots Magazine in May 1771 reckoned that "the Rankenians were highly instrumental in disseminating throughout Scotland freedom of thought, boldness of disquisition, liberality of sentiment, accuracy of reasoning, correctness of taste and accuracy of composition."

Its members were to become major figures of the Scottish Enlightenment, including:

- Charles Mackie (1688–1770), later the first professor of history at the University of Edinburgh
- John Stevenson (1695–1775), later professor of logic and rhetoric
- George Turnbull (1698–1748), theologian and professor of moral philosophy at Marischal College, Aberdeen
- Robert Wallace (1697–1771), theologian and population scientist
- William Wishart (1691–1753), leading church minister and principal of the University of Edinburgh
- Colin MacLaurin (1698–1746), philosopher and the greatest Scottish mathematician of his day
- George Young (1692–1757), surgeon and philosopher and the only surgeon known to have joined the society
