= George Young (surgeon, born 1692) =

- Born: 1692; Edinburgh
- Died: 1757 (aged 64–65)
- Occupations: Physician and surgeon
- Known for: Medical empiricism
- Medical career
- Notable works: Treatise on Opium

George Young (1692–1757) was an Edinburgh surgeon, physician, philosopher, and empiric. As a young man, he was a member of the Rankenian Club, a group of intellectuals who went on to become some of the most influential figures of the Scottish Enlightenment. Young's lecture notes (1730–31) give a clear account of contemporary medical and surgical practice and are characterised by the empirical approach to the advancement of medical knowledge, especially in the evolving understanding of nerve and muscle function. His Treatise on Opium (1753) was a practical guide for physicians in the use of the drug which emphasises its complications. It was the longest, most balanced and most comprehensive English language account yet written. Young's legacy is also apparent in the work of his pupil Robert Whytt (1714–1766) and his surgical apprentice James Hill (1703–1776). Young had taught both the value of repeated observation and a sceptical approach to prevailing dogma. Whytt was to advance knowledge of nerve and muscle function, while Hill went on to make important contributions to the understanding and management of head injury.

== Early life ==
Young was born in Edinburgh in 1692. On 14 March 1711 he was apprenticed to the Edinburgh surgeon-apothecary Alexander Simpson. In July 1719 he passed the entrance examination for the Incorporation of Surgeons of Edinburgh, becoming a freeman or fellow. Around this time he joined the Rankenian Club, the only surgeon known to have done so. The Rankenian was regarded as one of the most important of the many learned clubs and societies which were a defining feature of the Scottish Enlightenment. The Scots Magazine in May 1771 reckoned that "the Rankenians were highly instrumental in disseminating throughout Scotland freedom of thought, boldness of disquisition, liberality of sentiment, accuracy of reasoning, correctness of taste and accuracy of composition." Its members were to become major figures of the Scottish Enlightenment.

== Medical career ==
Young worked as surgeon-apothecary in Edinburgh from about 1720, and between then and 1754 trained twelve surgical apprentices. Yet he was attracted to a career as a physician and to qualify as such he applied for, and on 21 June 1736 was awarded, the degree of MD (St Andrews) in absentia. The next year he successfully applied to become a licentiate of the Royal College of Physicians of Edinburgh (RCPE).

=== Young's lectures ===
In 1730–31 Young delivered lectures in Edinburgh on medicine and surgery, a copy of which is in the RCPE library. His surgical background and the influence of his Rankenian friends are apparent throughout his lectures; he repeatedly emphasises the need to rely on observed rather than inferred phenomena before reaching conclusions. His philosophy of medicine based on observation and experience is very much in the tradition of Thomas Sydenham (1624–1689), the English physician who emphasised careful observation and objective characterisation of disease. The lectures provide a comprehensive account of contemporary medical, and some surgical practice but also deal with contemporary theories about nerve and muscle function. Young was well versed in the literature of the day and analysed the theories of James Keill (1673–1719), the Edinburgh physician and anatomist, Daniel Bernoulli (1700–1782) the Swiss mathematician and physician, John Mayow (1641–79), who had devised the 'gunpowder theory' of muscle function. He was sceptical about the iatromechanical theories of Herman Boerhaave (1668–1738) and Thomas Willis (1621–75). The lectures were documented by his pupil Robert Whytt (1714–1766), and their influence on his thinking on nerve and muscle function is apparent in Whytt's Essay on the Vital and Other Involuntary Motions of Animals published in 1751.

=== Treatise on opium ===
The treatise was published 1753 as a response to an important paper on opium published in 1742 by Young's Edinburgh contemporary Charles Alston (1683–1760), professor of botany and materia medica. Alston described opium's history and its preparation from poppies he had grown, the first person in Britain to have done so. Young took exception to Alston's conclusion that 'opium does more honour to medicine than any other remedy whatever' and counters this by emphasising the risks '...that I may prevent such mischief as I can, I here give it as my sincere opinion... that opium is a poison by which great numbers are daily destroyed.' In 41 chapters he provides a comprehensive account of the indications for the drug including its complications. True to his reputation he is critical about writers whose knowledge of the drug is based on chemical or animal experiments rather than clinical practice. The treatise is a detailed, balanced and valuable guide to prevailing knowledge and practice.

=== Young's apprentice James Hill ===
James Hill (1703–1776) was apprenticed to George Young in 1723 and went on to work as a surgeon in Dumfries. In 1772 he published Cases in Surgery which was in effect an account of cases that he had treated over a working lifetime in surgery including head injuries. Hill had been taught by Young the value of observation and the need for scepticism. Hills's series of head injuries which he had treated were the best published in the eighteenth century. Hill's ability to clinically diagnose cerebral compression from bleeding following head injury enabled him to treat this successfully by directed trephine and drainage. His writing was an important addition to the increasing understanding of the basis of the management of head injury, and was being quoted 100 years after publication.

== Legacy ==
Young was recognised by Whytt (and presumably by other contemporaries) as a sceptic and empiric, and, in his discussions with fellow Rankenians may well have influenced the early thoughts on the doctrine of empiricism developed by David Hume and that of scepticism with which he is associated. The similarities between Young's lectures and what became Hume's analysis of causation, probability, and practice are striking. His influence on Hill and Whytt was considerable and his son, Thomas Young became Professor of Midwifery at Edinburgh, and was credited with setting up, at his own expense, the first lying-in ward in Scotland in Edinburgh Royal Infirmary. Young's reputation may have been damaged by his actions leading up to the divorce of his son George. His philosophy is summarised in his entry in the Dictionary of eighteenth-century British philosophers.
