= George Wallace (American football) =

American football player and coach

Playing career
- 1883: Fordham
- 1885: Fordham

Coaching career (HC unless noted)
- 1885: Fordham

Head coaching record
- Overall: 0–3

George W. Wallace was an American college football player and coach. He was the second head football coach at Fordham University, serving for one season, in 1885, and compiling a record of 0–3.

== Head coaching record ==
Year	Team	Overall	Conference	Standing	Bowl/playoffs
Fordham (Independent) (1885)
1885	Fordham	0–3			
Fordham:		0–3			
Total:		0–3			
