= John Clement Adams =

American composer and educator

John Clement Adams (born November 28, 1947, in Attleboro, Massachusetts) is an American composer and educator.

== Biography ==
Adams studied music at Harvard, receiving a B.A. in 1969 and a Ph.D in 1982. His teachers included Leon Kirchner, Earl Kim, Ivan Tcherepnin, and Tison Street. His thesis was the composition Electric Wake. He continued studies at Tanglewood with Jacob Druckman, Alan Stout, and Seymour Shifrin. In 1972 he became a faculty member of the Boston Conservatory, and retired in 2001 as chair of the composition department. He was also a visiting lecturer at Harvard.

Among his awards include the B.M.I. Award in 1970, the Margaret Grant Award from Tanglewood in 1974 (when he was a composition fellow), and the 1979 UMass/Boston award in music composition (which resulted in performance at the 2nd annual Harbor Festival "Winds and Airs - Music to Celebrate Spring" on UMass Boston's campus in April 1979).

Some of his compositions have been published by Schirmer. Among his students are Steven David Stalzer, Bonnie Cochran, William Eldridge, Robin Baker, Gary Lloyd Noland, Yuriko Kojima, Pasquale Tassone, Hau-yee Ng, Alejandro Madrid, and Hayato Hirose.

== Other composers named John Adams ==
There are at least two other composers named John Adams, which has led to several points of confusion, including mistaken festival programming and incorrect authority control attributions: John Coolidge Adams (who goes professionally by John Adams), and John Luther Adams. Further complicating the matter is that both John C. Adams studied at Harvard at the same time, including having had their theses overseen by Leon Kirchner.

== Selected works ==
- Kyrie and Sanctus, date unknown, for SATB chorus
- Some keep the Sabbath going to Church, date unknown
- Klein[e] Kammermusik, op. 24 No. 2, date unknown, in three movements
- Overture to Oberon, for baritone, chorus & orchestra, date unknown
- Piano Trio, date unknown, premiered April 23, 1993, by Boston Conservatory Chamber Ensemble at First & Second Church
- Study (Dolls and Dreams), 1966, for violin and piano
- Er Kommt, 1967, for piano (played inside with mallet and pick)
- Moment, 1967, for piano
- Seven Canons, 1968, for clarinet and bass clarinet
- Electric Wake, 1969, for soprano, speaker, & string quartet (all amplified), harp, celeste, piano, percussion. Based on poems from Jeffrey Hamm's Talley Felt The Rain.
- Genesis, 1970, a cantata for 3 SATB choruses, flute, 2 string orchestras, organ based on text from the Book of Genesis.
- Piano Sonata, 1970, premiered 1974 by Alfred Lee
- For Tomorrow, 1971, for chamber orchestra
- Three Pieces, 1971, for piano (Prelude; Reflections I; Reflections II), premiered by Chandler Gregg
- Five Songs, 1972, for soprano and piano, text by the composer, premiered by Elizabeth Parcels and Barbara Kautzman at Tanglewood in 1974.
- Band, 1973, for wind ensemble.
- Chambers, 1974, for saxophone, piano, chamber ensemble
- Ibidem, 1974, for piano 4-hands, premiered at Boston Conservatory in 1974 by the composer and Alfred Lee.
- Trio, 1975, for flute, cello, and piano. Premiered in 1975 by Alan Greenberg, Michael Czitrom, and Peter Helms.
- Variations, 1976, for piano and orchestra, dedicated to Alfred Lee, premiered by Lee with the Buffalo Philharmonic Orchestra in 1977.
- Sonatina, 1977, for piano, premiered by Alfred Lee
- Aria, 1979, for flute. Dedicated to Daniel Riley, premiered by Riley in April 1979 at Boston Conservatory
- Sonata for cello and piano, 1979, dedicated to Mark Simcox, premiered in 1979 by Simcox and Alfred Lee, published by Schirmer in 1987
- String Quartet, 1980, in 7 movements
- Dream dances, 1981, for flute, clarinet, guitar, and cello.
- Quintet, 1981, for woodwind quintet
- Violin Concerto, 1982, his Harvard PhD thesis, dedicated to his eventual husband Thurston Smith, premiered April 17, 1992, by Victor Romanul with the Berkshire Symphony in Chapin Hall, Williams College
- Symphony, 1984, premiered February 24 1985 at the Sanders Theatre by the Pro Arte Chamber Orchestra of Boston.
- Five pieces for guitar, 1991
- Caprice for Flute and Piano, 1986, a commission from the James Pappoutsakis Flute Competition in Boston.
- Fantasy, 1986, for piano
- Four Pastoral Pieces, 1986, for organ
- Two songs, 1988, for soprano and piano, settings of "Spring and Fall" by G. M. Hopkins and "The birds begun" by Emily Dickinson
- Heine Songs, 1988, settings of Aus den Himmelsaugen, Dein Angesicht, Die Linde blüte, and Fragen, for high voice and piano. Premiered in May 1988 by the Boston Chamber Music Society (resident ensemble of the Boston Conservatory).
- Nocturne, 1988, for piano, flute, cello, and violin
- Eight views for piano, circa 1988/1989, premiered March 5, 1989 in Paine Hall at a concert celebrating Leon Kirchner's 70th birthday, featuring works composed for the occasion by 14 other of Kirchner's former students.
- Diversion for Seven Flutes, 1989, premiered April 13, 1989, at Boston Conservatory's Seully Hall
- Fantasy duo for cello and percussion, 1996
- Three Lyric Pieces for Violin and Piano, 1997, premiered by Victor Romanul and Janice Weber on April 6, 1997, at First & Second Church.
- Affirmations, 1998, for baritone, chorus, and orchestra, premiered December 4, 1998, by Robert Honeysucker, the Boston Conservatory Orchestra and Chorale
