= John Adams (Master of Sidney Sussex College, Cambridge) =

John Adams, D.D. was an academic in the eighteenth century.

Adams was born at Newport, Shropshire and educated at Sidney Sussex College, Cambridge. He was elected a Fellow of Sidney Sussex College, Cambridge in 1714; and ordained a priest of the Church of England on 23 December 1716. Adams was Master of Sidney from 1730 until his death on 12 August 1746; and Vice-Chancellor of the University of Cambridge from 1735 to 1736.
