= John A. Adam (journalist) =

American writer and editor (born 1949)

- Born: 1949 (age 76–77)
- Occupation: Journalist

John A. Adam (born 1949) is an American writer and editor based in Washington, D.C.

Adams has worked on many projects including the profiling of various leaders in science and technology, Internet pioneers Bob Kahn and Vint Cerf, pacemaker inventor Wilson Greatbatch, and earth scientist Marcia McNutt.

He also conducted investigative reports on cryptography, stealth aircraft, arms control verification, Brazil's power, and the Gulf War.

Adams' accomplishments in the field of journalism include publications in Scientific American, ARTnews, Discover, The New York Times, and The Washington Post.

During his tenure as a staff writer at IEEE Spectrum, he received four National Magazine Awards honors: Reporting in 1993; finalist in 1988; and Special Issues in 1986 and 1990.
