= George Wallace (advocate) =

Scottish advocate, jurist and author

George Wallace FRSE (1727–1805) was a Scottish advocate, jurist and author. In 1783 he was one of the founders of the Royal Society of Edinburgh.

== Life ==
He was born in Edinburgh in 1727 the son of Very Rev Dr Robert Wallace DD (1697-1771), and his wife, Helen Turnbull. His father was elected Moderator of the General Assembly of the Church of Scotland in 1743.

Wallace was admitted a member of the Faculty of Advocates, Edinburgh, on 16 Feb. 1754. In 1773 he appears in the first Edinburgh Street Directory as "George Wallace, advocate" living at Scotts Close on the Cowgate. He is still living there in 1785 but by 1795 is living at Teviot Row.

He was appointed a commissary of Edinburgh in 1792.

By 1800 he is living at Lauriston in the south of the city. His final Edinburgh address is given as Argyle Square, a popular location for Edinburgh's lawyers.

He died in Edinburgh on 13 March 1805.

== Publications ==
Wallace published in 1760 in Edinburgh a System of the Principles of the Law of Scotland. It contained criticism of slavery and recommended surrendering empire if empire required exploitation of slave labor. Following Montesquieu, Wallace denied all classical grounds for justifying enslavement. Louis de Jaucourt translated some part of the book for his article "Traite des nègres" (Slave trade) in the Encyclopédie, one of the first real denunciations of the colonial project in French thought.

He also published Thoughts on the Origin of Feudal Tenures and the Descent of Ancient Peerages in Scotland (1783; 2nd edit., Nature and Descent of Ancient Peerages connected with the State of Scotland, 1785), and Prospects from Hills in Fife (1796, 2nd edit. 1800).

== Bibliography ==
- Lee, Sidney, ed. (1899). "Wallace, Robert (1697-1771)" . Dictionary of National Biography. Vol. 59. London: Smith, Elder & Co.
- Curran, Andrew S. (2011). The Anatomy of Blackness: Science and Slavery in an Age of Enlightenment. JHU Press. ISBN 978-1-4214-0230-7.
- Davis, David Brion (1988). From Homicide to Slavery: Studies in American Culture. Oxford University Press. ISBN 978-0-19-505418-7.
- Davis, David Brion (1999). The Problem of Slavery in the Age of Revolution, 1770-1823. Oxford University Press. ISBN 978-0-19-802949-6.
- de Jaucourt, Louis (1765). "Traite des nègres". Encyclopédie (in French).
- de Jaucourt, Louis (1765). "Slave trade". The Encyclopedia of Diderot and d’Alembert.

== Notes ==
Attribution

This article incorporates text from a publication now in the public domain: Lee, Sidney, ed. (1899). "Wallace, Robert (1697-1771)". Dictionary of National Biography. Vol. 59. London: Smith, Elder & Co.
