= Henri François Le Dran =

French surgeon (1685–1770)

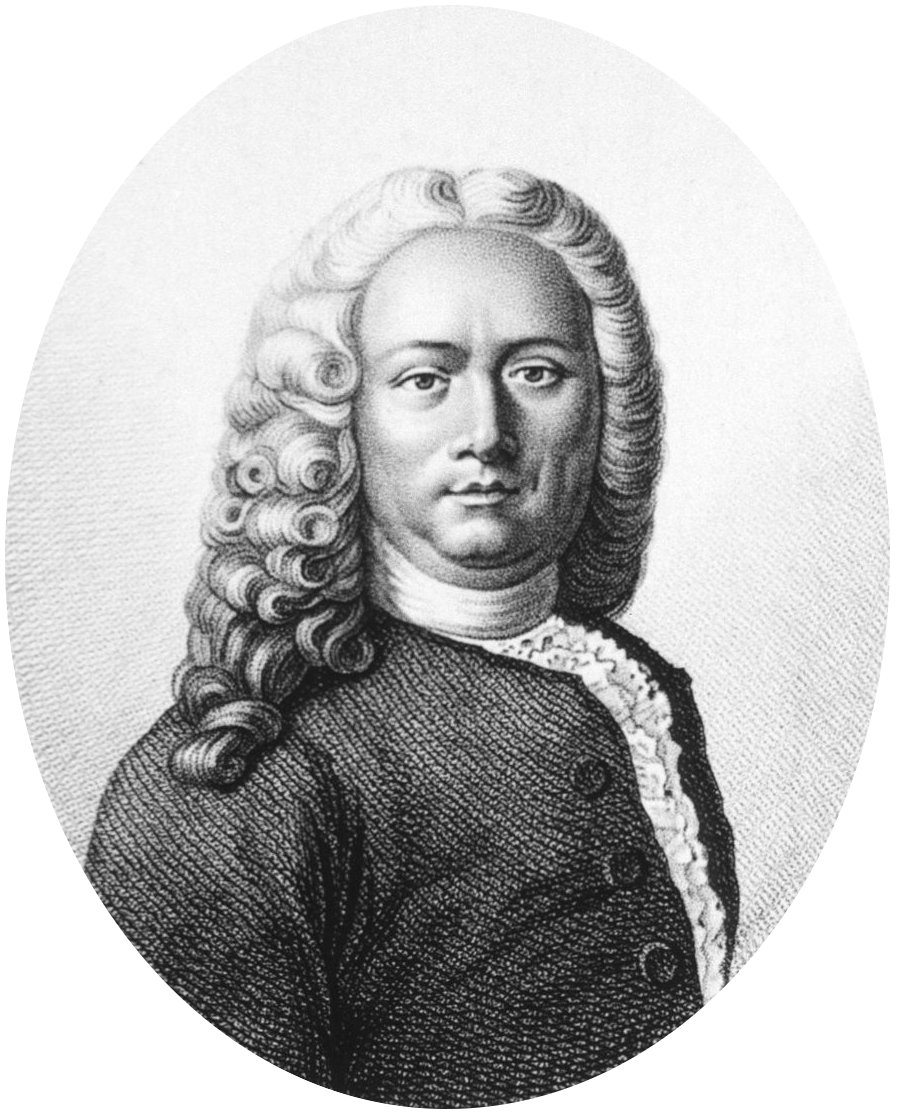
Henri François Le Dran

Henri François Le Dran (13 October 1685 – 17 October 1770) was a French surgeon.

He gave lectures with the Royal Academy of Medicine in Paris, and practiced surgery at Hôpital de la Charité. He is remembered for his work with surgeon Jean-Louis Petit (1674–1750). Among his students was Swiss anatomist Albrecht von Haller (1708–1777).

Le Dran made contributions in his pioneer research of cancer, and his work involving military surgery. He was among the first physicians to realize that cancer was a local affliction, and not a systemic malady. He postulated that cancer progressed in stages, and that it began as a local organic disease. He advocated surgery for cancer before the tumor was allowed to metastasize through the lymphatic system and affect other parts of the body.

In 1741, Le Dran was the first to describe the phenomenon known as the Spigelian hernia.

He was elected in January 1745 a Fellow of the Royal Society.

He is widely credited for introducing the medical term "shock" (choquer), which he defined in a treatise on gunshot wounds as a sudden impact or jolt. Among his written works was a 1749 surgical treatise called Traité des opérations de chirurgie, being later translated into English and published as "The Operations in Surgery".

== Bibliography ==
- Bookrags Henri François Le Dran | Research & Encyclopedia Articles.
