= George Wallace (English cricketer) =

English cricketer

Personal information
- Full name: George Henry Wallace
- Born: 18 September 1854; Great Budworth, Cheshire, England
- Died: 24 November 1927 (aged 73); Notting Hill, London, England
- Source: ESPNcricinfo, 25 June 2016

George Henry Wallace (18 September 1854 – 24 November 1927) was an English cricketer. He was educated at the Clergy Orphan School and Jesus College, Cambridge, and played one first-class match for Cambridge University Cricket Club in 1876. After graduating from Cambridge, Wallace became a barrister and was appointed a King's Counsel and a Bencher.

== See also ==
- List of Cambridge University Cricket Club players
