= USS John Adams =

USS John Adams may refer to the following ships of the United States Navy:

- USS John Adams (1799) was a frigate, launched in 1799 and sold in 1867
- USS John Adams (SSBN-620), was a Lafayette-class submarine commissioned in 1964 and decommissioned in 1989

== See also ==
- USS Adams
