= John Adams (economist) =

Australian economist

- Born: Illawarra, New South Wales, Australia
- Education: Kanahooka High School; University of New South Wales; University of Wollongong
- Occupation: Economist
- Years active: 2012–present
- Known for: Public advocacy on Australian economic policy
- Website: adamseconomics.com

John Adams is an Australian economist, public policy advocate and conspiracy theorist. He is the founder of Adams Economics.

Previously, he served as an economic adviser in the Australian Parliament. In this capacity, he served as a senior adviser to then Senator Arthur Sinodinos and was responsible for developing the Liberal-National Coalition’s deregulation policy for the 2013 federal election campaign.

== Early life and education ==
Adams was raised in the Illawarra region of New South Wales and attended Kanahooka High School, where he was a student chess champion.

== Career ==
=== Early career ===
Adams began his career in public policy in the Commonwealth public service in Canberra. He later moved into management consulting with a Big Four accounting firm, where he focused on regulatory analysis and public sector governance.

From 2012 to 2013, Adams served as a senior economic and policy adviser to Senator Arthur Sinodinos. During this time, he was responsible for developing the Liberal-National Coalition’s deregulation policy for the 2013 federal election campaign. After leaving his role in Parliament, Adams returned to private sector management consulting and also held several positions within the New South Wales Public Service.

=== Public advocacy ===
Adams later transitioned his career to public advocacy, formulating and advocating for policy reform proposals. In 2015, he proposed that Australians be permitted to use their superannuation savings to pay down student loan debt, a policy that gained support from then-Senator Chris Back. In the same year, Adams was appointed as the Director of Government Relations with the Australian Chess Federation and in this role, he advocated to include chess in the national curriculum.

Beginning in 2016, Adams became a public commentator on the Australian economy, politics, and public policy through a series of opinion columns in the Daily Telegraph and appearances on the ABC's The Drum. In his writings, Adams expressed concerns about high household debt and stagnant wage growth. In 2018, through a four-part series on news.com.au, he warned of a potential major economic crisis, which he termed "Economic Armageddon." His economic views gained further national attention through a televised debate with fund manager Christopher Joye in 2019.

In July 2018, Adams began appearing on Martin North's YouTube channel. In January 2019, the pair launched their own YouTube show, In the Interests of the People (IOTP), with Adams serving as executive producer and co-host. The program became known for heterodox commentary and its coverage of issues such as the 2019 property crisis in Mandurah, Western Australia, and the Sri Lankan debt crisis, which attracted attention from politicians and media outlets. Through the IOTP platform, Adams engaged in public debate on specific government policies. He questioned the physical gold holdings of the Reserve Bank of Australia and was a prominent opponent of a 2019 legislative proposal, Currency (Restrictions on the Use of Cash) Bill 2019, to ban cash transactions over $10,000. In a Senate committee submission, he argued the measure would negatively affect privacy and economic freedom. Adams subsequently testified a public hearing of the Senate Economics Legislation Committee inquiry into the proposed legislation. In December 2020, the legislative proposal was ultimately defeated after a motion was moved by One Nation in the Australian Senate".

In 2022, Adams published research based on a decade of public reports from the Australian Securities and Investments Commission (ASIC), concluding that the agency investigated less than one percent of reports of alleged misconduct it received. He argued this undermined enforcement against corporate misconduct. His findings led to a Senate inquiry into ASIC's performance, chaired by Senator Andrew Bragg. The inquiry's final report, released in July 2024, recommended that ASIC be abolished and a new regulatory architecture be established.

=== Corporate investigator ===
From September 2023 to May 2024, Adams conducted a review of ASIC's original investigation, alleging in a subsequent 200-page report that ABC Bullion had manipulated its operations during the investigation, which he argued constituted breaches of NSW state law and likely Commonwealth law. The matter was covered in a three-part series by Michael West Media in 2024.

== Public controversies ==
In 2020, Adams drew public and media attention after he disclosed on social media that he had been contacted by the Australian Broadcasting Corporation (ABC) for a proposed segment on whether the "white moves first" rule in chess could be considered racist. The resulting discussion attracted international media coverage and was featured on the ABC's Media Watch program. Adams also made a number of twitter posts that attempt to support the conspiracy theory involving Dominion voting machines and the legitimacy of the 2020 US Presidential Election. The following year, in 2021, Adams became a vocal critic of government responses to COVID-19 lockdowns, using his social media platforms to post critiques of the policies.
