= John Quincy Adams (Bingham) =

Painting by George Caleb Bingham

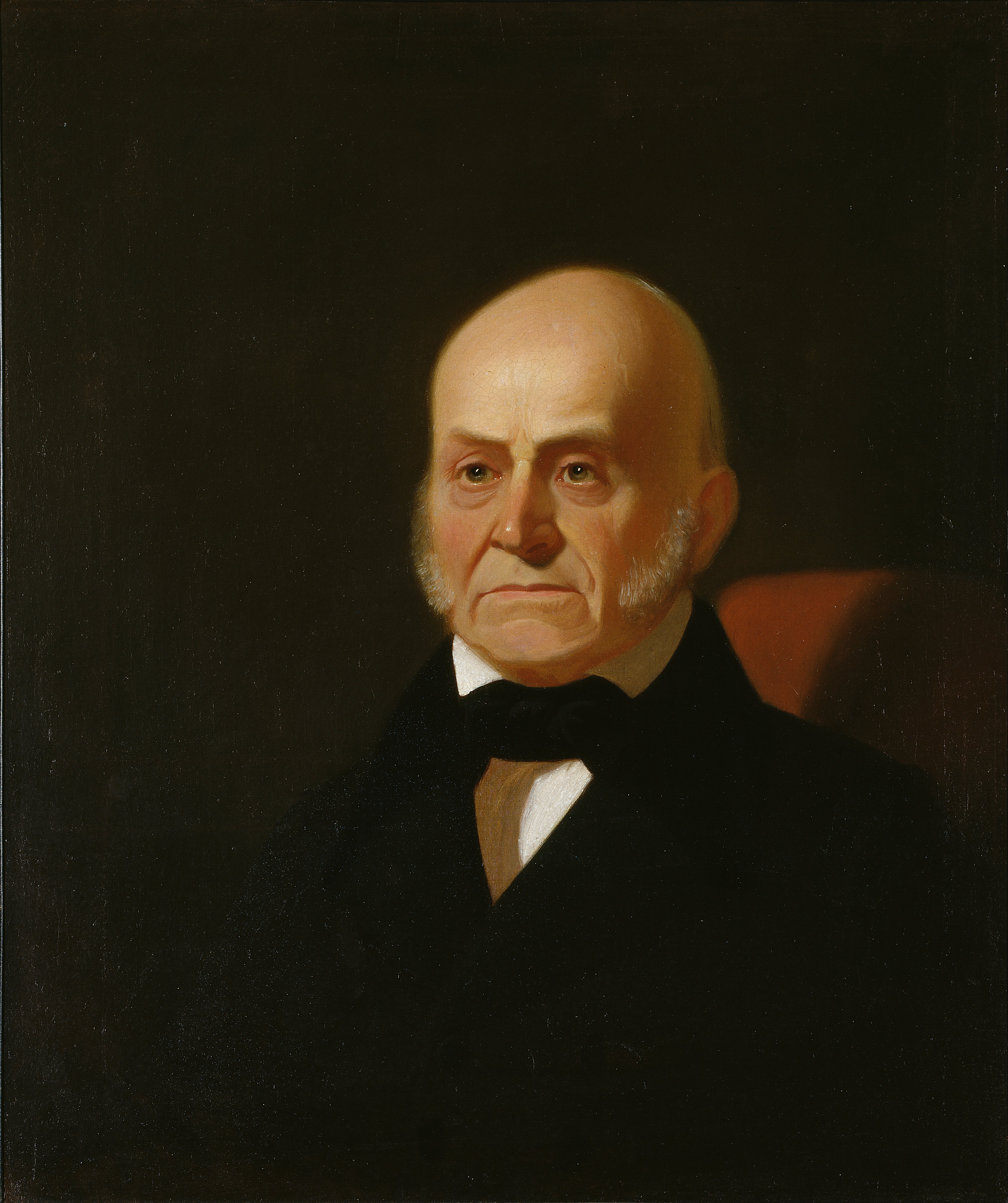
- Artist: George Caleb Bingham
- Subject: John Quincy Adams

John Quincy Adams is a portrait painting by George Caleb Bingham. It depicts John Quincy Adams, the sixth president of the United States and the son of Founding Father John Adams.

== History ==
In the National Portrait Gallery's "America's Presidents" exhibit, the oil painting has been displayed next to a daguerreotype of Adams.

== Reception ==
In 2016, Holland Cotter of The New York Times considered the painting among the best presidential portraits. In 2020, Crispin artwell of Reason magazine wrote, "John Quincy Adams, by George Caleb Bingham, sets the chastened tone of the generation after the Founders, a beautifully flat and direct approach that contrasts favorably with the grand gestures that preceded it and with some of those that followed."

== See also ==
- Portraits of presidents of the United States
