= John Quincy Adams (railroad official) =

American railroad official (1848 - 1919)

John Quincy Adams (June 16, 1848 – November 13, 1919) was an employee of the Milwaukee Road Railroad. Technically, he was serving in the capacity of general land and townsite agent for Milwaukee Land Company, a subsidiary of the Chicago, Milwaukee, St. Paul and Pacific Railroad. Adams County, North Dakota (created 1907) is named after Adams. Adams platted Three Forks, Montana in 1908. He was a distant relative of John Adams (the 2nd U.S. president) and John Quincy Adams (the 6th U.S. president). He was born in Troy, Vermont to Benjamin S. and Susan Smith (Pierce) Adams. He married Francis S. Smith on December 23, 1874; they had two children, the senior of them is Benjamin. John Quincy Adams died in Chicago, Illinois.

Adams County, ND

== Career ==
He was educated at Grand River Institute, and in 1868 he received a B.S. in Cedar Valley Seminary. He began in 1869 as deputy county auditor, Mitchell County, Louisiana, continuing 1 year. Then, he was the travelling salesman for 10 years. He was member of mem. Griffin & Adams, bankers, Spencer, for 10 years. He is identified with large transactions in lands and loans since 1892, and from May 1902 to 1910, president of the Adams & Denmead Co., dealing in western lands and mortgage loans; president Coast Line Land Co., of Three Forks, Montana, Adams Investment Co., of Marshall-town. He was a Republican and Mason.
