= Jack Adams (ice hockey, born 1919) =

Canadian ice hockey player (1919–1996)

John Adams
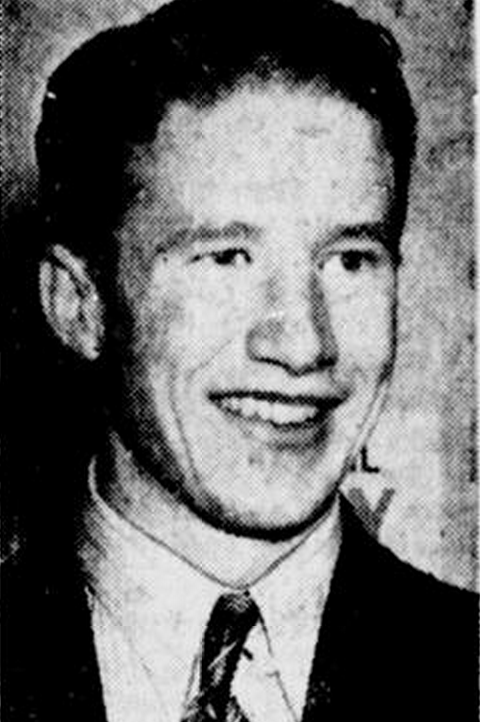
- Born: May 5, 1919 Calgary, Alberta, Canada
- Died: August 21, 1996 (aged 77) Surrey, British Columbia, Canada
- Height: 5 ft 11 in (180 cm)
- Weight: 163 lb (74 kg; 11 st 9 lb)
- Position: Left wing
- Shot: Left
- Played for: Montreal Canadiens
- Playing career: 1938–1949

John Ellis Adams (May 5, 1919 – August 21, 1996) was a Canadian ice hockey left winger who played one season in the National Hockey League with the Montreal Canadiens, in 1940–41. The rest of his career, which lasted from 1938 to 1949, was spent in various minor leagues. He was born in Calgary, Alberta. He died on August 21, 1996, in Surrey, British Columbia.

== Playing career ==
Jack Adams played 42 regular season games and three playoff games for the Montreal Canadiens in the 1940–41 NHL season. During the regular season, he scored 6 goals and 18 points; during the playoffs, he was held pointless.

He also played for several Canadian minor league hockey teams, both before and after his NHL stint.

In 1941, he was married to Valerie Rowan of Vancouver, British Columbia. He died in 1996 in Surrey, British Columbia. His wife, Valerie died in 2009.

== Career statistics ==
=== Regular season and playoffs ===
			Regular season					Playoffs
Season	Team	League	GP	G	A	Pts	PIM	GP	G	A	Pts	PIM
1936–37	Calgary Canadians	CCJHL	1	0	0	0	0	—	—	—	—	—
1937–38	Calgary K of C	CCCHL	11	4	5	9	2	1	0	0	0	0
1938–39	Vancouver Lions	PCHL	29	5	13	18	16	—	—	—	—	—
1939–40	Vancouver Lions	PCHL	40	12	12	24	16	—	—	—	—	—
1940–41	Montreal Canadiens	NHL	42	6	12	18	11	3	0	0	0	0
1942–43	Calgary RCAF Mutangs	CNDHL	22	19	12	31	15	8	5	6	11	4
1943–44	Vancouver RCAF	NNDHL	9	4	3	7	11	—	—	—	—	—
1943–44	Vancouver RCAF Seahawks	NNDHL	—	—	—	—	—	3	2	2	4	4
1944–45	Vancouver RCAF	NNDHL	—	—	—	—	—	—	—	—	—	—
1945–46	Montreal Royals	QSHL	4	2	1	3	5	—	—	—	—	—
1945–46	Buffalo Bisons	AHL	19	2	2	4	0	9	4	4	8	4
1946–47	Houston Skippers	USHL	20	2	5	7	6	—	—	—	—	—
1947–48	New Westminster Royals	PCHL	52	20	13	33	36	—	—	—	—	—
1948–49	New Westminster Royals	PCHL	41	8	8	16	21	12	1	2	3	8
PCHL totals			162	45	46	91	89	24	2	4	6	16
NHL totals			42	6	12	18	11	3	0	0	0	0
