= Bert Adams =

American baseball player (1891-1940)

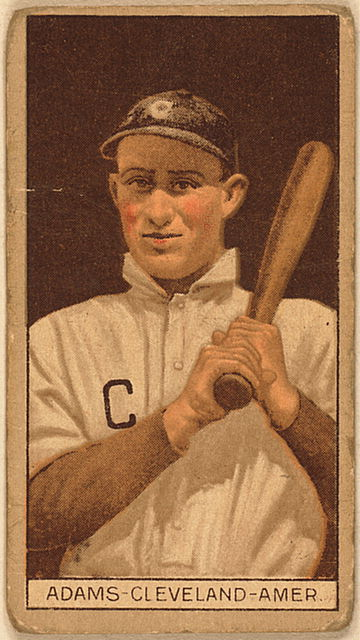
- Catcher
- Born: June 21, 1891; Wharton, Texas, U.S.
- Died: June 24, 1940 (aged 49); Los Angeles, California, U.S.
- Batted: Right Threw: Right

MLB debut
- August 30, 1910, for the Cleveland Naps

Last MLB appearance
- September 28, 1919, for the Philadelphia Phillies

MLB statistics
- Batting average: .202
- Home runs: 2
- Runs batted in: 45
- Stats at Baseball Reference

Teams
- Cleveland Naps (1910–1912); Philadelphia Phillies (1915–1919)

John Bertram Adams (June 21, 1891 – June 24, 1940) was an American professional baseball player in the early 20th century. Primarily a catcher, Adams played from 1910 to 1919, with the Cleveland Naps and Philadelphia Phillies. Adams died in 1940 at age 49 and was buried at Hollywood Forever Cemetery.
