= John Quincy Adams (editor) =

American editor (1848–1922)

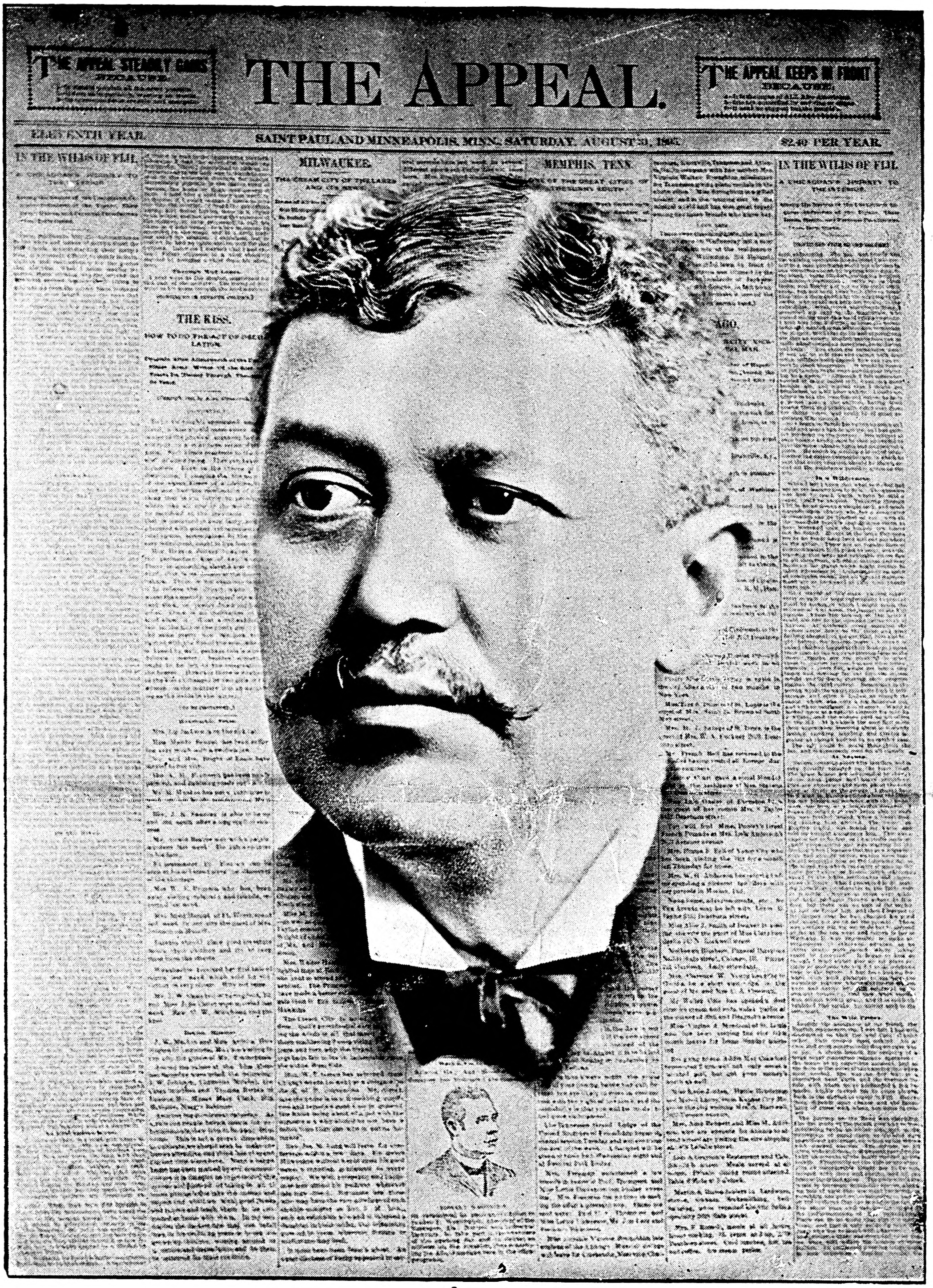
- Born: May 4, 1848; Louisville, Kentucky, U.S.
- Died: September 4, 1922 (aged 74); Saint Paul, Minnesota, U.S.
- Resting place: Oakland Cemetery, Saint Paul, Minnesota, U.S.
- Other names: J.Q. Adams, John Q. Adams
- Education: Oberlin College
- Political party: Republican
- Spouse: Ella Bell Smith (m. 1892–1922; death)
- Children: 4
- Father: Henry Adams
- Relatives: Cyrus Field Adams (brother), Joseph Carter Corbin (uncle)

John Quincy Adams (1848–1922) was an American newspaper editor and publisher, educator, civil rights activist, and politician. He served from 1887 to 1922 as the newspaper editor and later the owner of The Appeal of St. Paul, Minnesota. He served as an officer in the National Afro-American Council. He often went by the name J.Q. Adams.

== Early life and education ==
John Quincy Adams was listed as "mulatto" and born free on May 4, 1848, in Louisville, Kentucky. His parents were Margaret Priscilla (née Corbin) and the Baptist Rev. Henry Adams. He was one of five children, and Cyrus Field Adams was his brother. He attended private schools in Fond du Lac, Wisconsin, and Yellow Springs, Ohio.

Adams graduated from Oberlin College.

In 1892, Adams married Ella Bell Smith originally from St. Paul, Minnesota, and together they had four children.

== Career ==
After graduating from college, Adams moved to Little Rock, Arkansas to teach; followed by a role assisting his maternal uncle Joseph Carter Corbin, the state of Arkansas' Superintendent of Public Instruction.

Adams had been editor of the weekly newspaper, The Bulletin (or the Louisville Bulletin), in Louisville, Kentucky between 1879 and 1886. At The Bulletin, his teenaged brother Cyrus assisted him with the work. In 1886, Adams sold The Bulletin to the American Baptist.

He moved to St. Paul, Minnesota after the sale, where he became associate editor of The Appeal newspaper (then known as The Western Appeal). From 1886 to 1922, he worked at The Appeal newspaper; and in January 1887, Adams was promoted to the newspaper editor. With his promotion, Adams became the driving force behind the newspaper. Adams was an influential writer and a staunch Republican, and like other editors of his day, he expressed his opinions through his paper's editorial page. The Appeal received funding directly from the Republican Party, another common practice for newspapers of the time. He transformed the paper into a national publication with newspaper offices in Chicago, Dallas, Minneapolis, St. Louis, and Washington, D.C.

A young lawyer from Chicago who had recently moved to Saint Paul, Fredrick L. McGhee and Adams, worked together to challenge racial discrimination and civil rights issues in Minnesota. Together they founded the Protective and Industrial League of Minnesota, which affiliated in 1890 with the Afro-American League and later affiliated with the National Afro-American Council. Adams supported Booker T. Washington at the conventions of the National Afro-American Council in St. Paul (1902), and Louisville (1903).

Adams died when he was struck by an automobile in Saint Paul on September 4, 1922. He is buried at Oakland Cemetery in Saint Paul. A profile of him is included in the books The Afro-American Press and Its Editors (1891), and the American National Biography (1999).
