= Charles Adams =

Charles or Charlie Adams may refer to:

== Academics ==
- Charles Adams (headmaster) (1803–1871), English headteacher and secretary
- Charles Kendall Adams (1835–1902), American educator and historian
- Charles Joseph Adams (1924–2011), American educator and academic
- Charles P. Adams (college president) (1873–1961), founding president of Grambling State University

== Arts and entertainment ==
- Charles Warren Adams (1833–1903), English pioneer detective novelist, lawyer and anti-vivisectionist
- Charles Follen Adams (1842–1918), American poet
- Charles Partridge Adams (1858–1942), American landscape artist
- Charles James Adams (1859–1931), English landscape artist
- Charles Kingsley Adams (1899–1971), British civil servant; National Portrait Gallery director
- Charles R. Adams (1834–1900), American opera singer
- Charles Adams (1869–1937), pseudonym for Charles A. Prince, celesta soloist
- Charlie Adams (drummer) (born 1954), American drummer

== Military ==
- Charles W. Adams (Confederate general) (1817–1878), Confederate States Army officer; grandfather of Helen Keller
- Charles Powell Adams (1831–1893), brigadier general in the Union Army
- Charles W. Adams (Union general) (1834–1909), Union Army general during the American Civil War
- Charles Francis Adams Jr. (1835–1915), Civil War General and president of the Union Pacific Railroad
- Charles Adams (Colorado Indian agent) (1845–1895), American Civil War soldier and diplomat
- Charles J. Adams (U.S. Air Force general) (1921–2002), U.S. Air Force brigadier general

== Politics ==
- Charles Adams (1770–1800), son of John Adams; brother of John Quincy Adams
- Charles Adams (MP) (1753–1821), British member of parliament
- Charles C. Adams Jr. (born 1947), American diplomat, former ambassador, and lawyer
- Charles Francis Adams Sr. (1807–1886), grandson of John Adams, son of John Quincy Adams, U.S. congressman
- Charles H. Adams (New York politician) (1824–1902), U.S. representative from New York
- Charles H. Adams (Massachusetts journalist) (1859–1952), American journalist and politician
- Charles Edward Adams (politician) (1867–1936), lieutenant governor of Minnesota
- Charles Bayley Adams (1887–1961), Vermont politician, judge and attorney
- Charles J. Adams (Vermont politician) (1917–2008), Vermont politician and Attorney General
- Charles Francis Adams III (1866–1954), U.S. Navy secretary
- Charles Edward Adams (industrialist) (1881–1957), director of the Federal Reserve Bank of New York
- Charles Adams (Manitoba politician) (1858–1931), Canadian entrepreneur and Manitoba politician
- Charles Clinton Adams (1833–1906), American merchant and politician from New York
- Charles Frederic Adams (1851–1918), American idealist and lawyer

== Science ==
- Charles Baker Adams (1814–1853), American naturalist and academic
- Charles Hitchcock Adams (1868–1951), American astronomer
- Charles Christopher Adams (1873–1955), American zoologist
- Charles William Adams (surveyor) (1840–1918), New Zealand surveyor, astronomer and public servant
- Charles Adams (seismologist) (1870–1945), New Zealand university lecturer, surveyor, astronomer and seismologist

== Sports ==
- Babe Adams (Charles Benjamin Adams, 1882–1968), American baseball pitcher
- Charles Adams (ice hockey) (1876–1947), Boston Bruins founder
- Charlie Adams (American football) (born 1979), American football player
- Charlie Adams (Australian footballer) (1897–1986), Australian rules football player
- Charlie Adams (English footballer) (born 1994), English football player
- Charles Adams (rugby union) (1883–1965), Irish rugby union player

== Other ==
- Charles Francis Adams IV (1910–1999), president of Raytheon
- Charles Gilchrist Adams (1936–2023), American clergyman

== Ships ==
- Charles F. Adams-class destroyer, a ship class
- USS Charles F. Adams

== See also ==
- Charles Addams (1912–1988), American cartoonist
- Charlee Adams (born 1995), English football midfielder
- Charles Francis Adams (disambiguation)
- Charles Adam (disambiguation)
- Chuck Adams (born 1971), American tennis player
- Adams (surname)
