= Langone =

Langone is an Italian surname. Notable people with the surname include:

- Aboubacar Langone (born 2000), Italian footballer
- Clementina Poto Langone (1896–1964), Italian-American community activist
- Frederick C. Langone (1921–2001), American politician
- Joseph A. Langone Jr. (1896–1960), American politician
- Ken Langone (born 1935), American venture capitalist
- Michael Langone (born 1947), American counseling psychologist
- Oscar Langone (born 1953), Argentine-Australian footballer
- Stefano Langone (born 1989), American singer

== See also ==
- NYU Langone Health, academic medical center
- Langone Park, park in Boston, Massachusetts
