= Hot Molasses =

American rock band

- Origin: Somerville, Massachusetts, United States
- Genre: Rock
- Members: Ben Abrams; Andrew Cohen; Julia Dickinson; Peter Kriensky
- Past members: Irun Bahn; Michael Holloway; Sonya Larson; Matt Lerner; Dave Leskowitz; Doug Sisko; Elana Snow
- Website: hotmolasses.bandcamp.com

Hot Molasses is a rock band based in Somerville, Massachusetts. The band's name is a reference to the Boston Molasses Disaster of 1919.

Critic Jonathan Perry of the Boston Globe described Hot Molasses' sound as "tartly flavored, kinetically arranged pop-rock," comparing them to the B-52s and the New Pornographers. Boston-based public radio affiliate, WGBH, commented that, "Hot Molasses play a power pop that recalls the Canadian Baroque pop explosion of the late 90s and early 00s, from Broken Social Scene and the New Pornographers through Sloan." Hot Molasses seeks to raise awareness of political causes and advance economic and social justice through music, and has organized and played benefit concerts for charitable organizations including City Life/Vida Urbana, Alternatives for Community & Environment, Opportunity Africa, and Movimiento Cosecha.

== Discography ==
- Safety Last (2018)
- Self-titled EP (2016)
- Machinery Making Animal (2012)
- Frankly (2011)
- Molassachusetts (2010)
