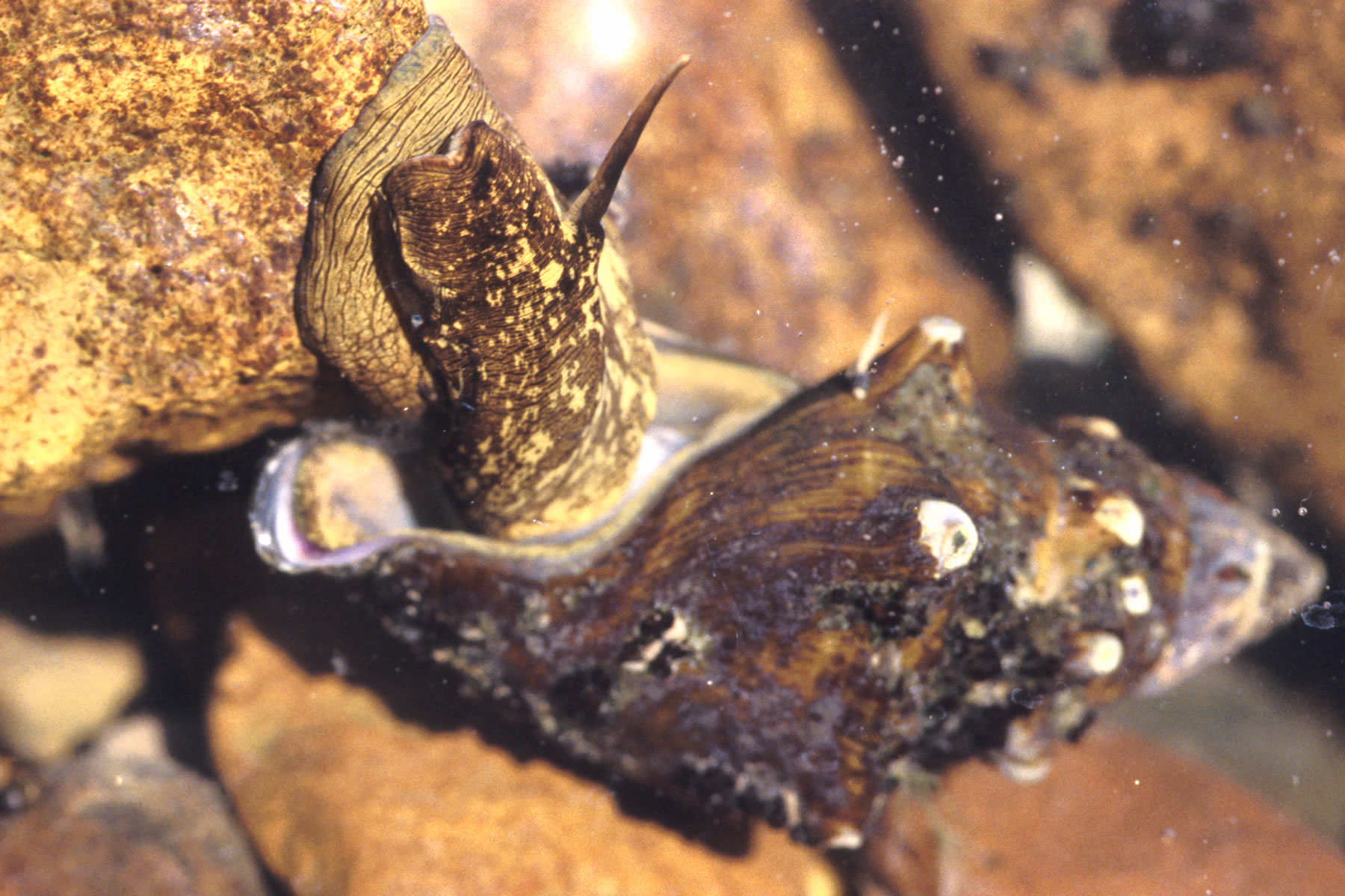
- A live individual of Io fluvialis
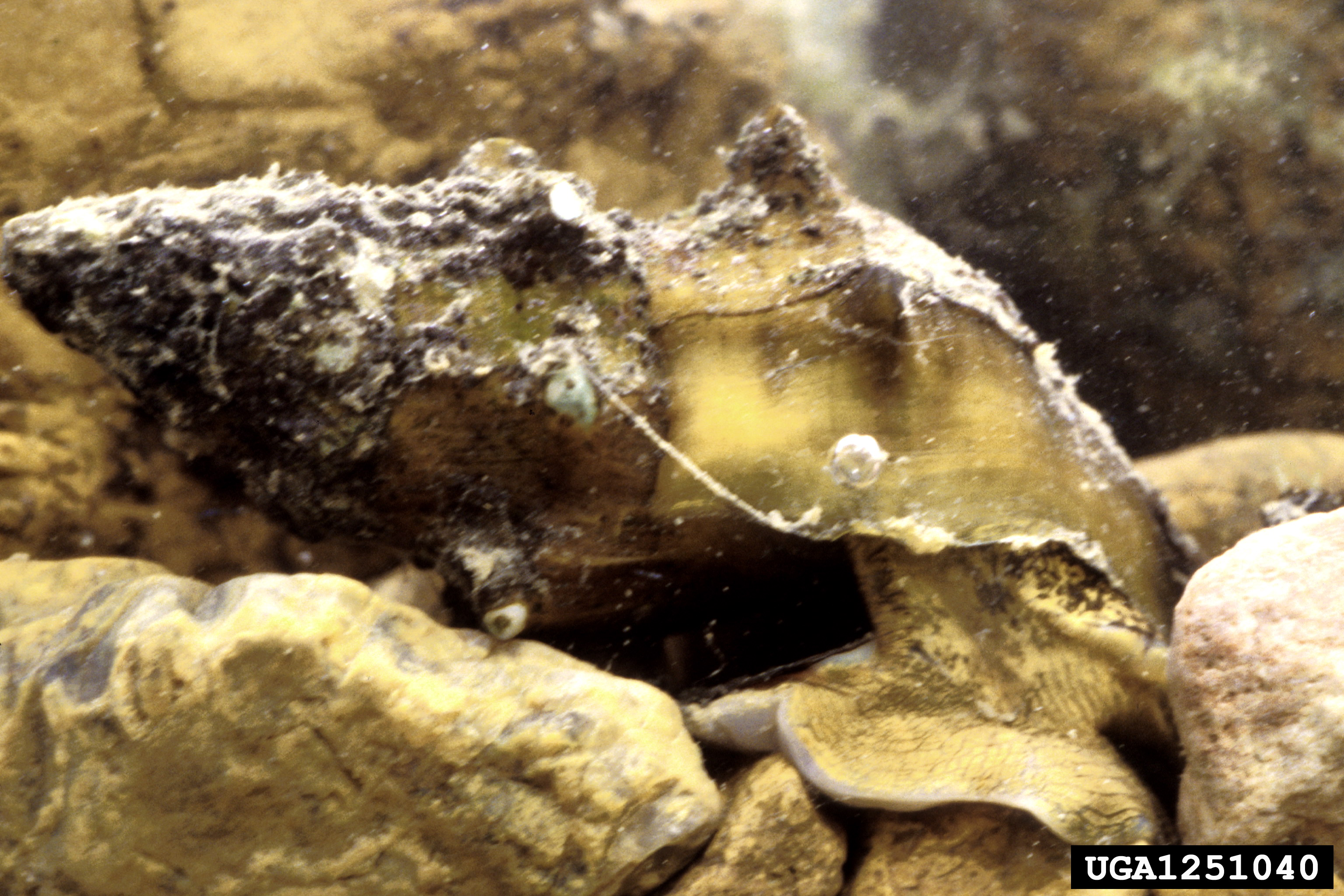
- A live individual of Io fluvialis

Conservation status
- Endangered (IUCN 2.3)

- Critically Imperiled (NatureServe)

Scientific classification
- Kingdom: Animalia
- Phylum: Mollusca
- Class: Gastropoda
- Subclass: Caenogastropoda
- Order: incertae sedis
- Superfamily: Cerithioidea
- Family: Pleuroceridae
- Genus: Io; Lea, 1831
- Species: I. fluvialis

Binomial name
- Io fluvialis (Say, 1825)

Synonyms
- List: Fusus fluvialis Say, 1825; Io angitremoides Adams, 1915; Io brevis Anthony, 1860; Io clinchensis Adams, 1915; Io fluvialis turrita Anthony, 1860; Io fusiformis Lea, 1831; Io gibbosa Reeve, 1861; Io inermis Anthony, 1860; Io loudenensis Goodrich, 1940; Io loudonensi Adams, 1915; Io loudonensis Adams, 1915; Io lurida Reeve, 1861; Io lyttonensis Adams, 1915; Io nolichuckyensis Adams, 1915; Io paulensis Adams, 1915; Io powellensis Adams, 1915; Io recta Reeve, 1861; Io rhombica Reeve, 1861; Io spinosa Lea, 1834; Io spirostoma Anthony, 1860; Io tenebrosa Lea, 1841; Io turrita Anthony, 1860; Io unakensis Adams, 1915; Io verrucosa Reeve, 1860

= Spiny river snail =

Species of mollusc

The spiny river snail, scientific name Io fluvialis, is a freshwater snail species, an aquatic mollusk in the Pleuroceridae family. This is the only species in the genus Io. This species is endemic to the USA.

== Ecology ==
=== Distribution ===
This species is endemic to the Tennessee River and its larger tributaries, but it has been largely extirpated due to pollution and the construction of dams.

=== Habitat ===
These snails live in rapidly flowing, well-oxygenated waters of shoals and riffles of rivers, but not in slack water below shoals. The species preferred water depth of up to 1.5 m.

=== Behavior ===
These snails feed on the algal coating on rocks. Females lay between 20 and 100 eggs, which begin to hatch after 15 days.

== Description ==
The shell morphology is very variable, with some individuals totally lacking spines. For this reason, it was formerly thought that many species existed within this genus.

== Human relevance ==
The shells are found abundantly in shell middens along the rivers within their range, indicating they were exploited as a food source by Native American cultures. Additionally, this snail has served as the emblem for the American Malacological Society since 1960.
