= Aboubacar Langone =

Ivorian-Italian footballer (born 2000)

Personal information
- Full name: Aboubacar Langone Soumahoro
- Date of birth: 5 July 2000 (age 26)
- Place of birth: Daloa, Ivory Coast
- Position: Midfielder

Team information
- Current team: Brindisi

Youth career
- Picerno

Senior career*
Years	Team	Apps	(Gls)
2018–2020	Picerno	28	(3)
2020	→ Fidelis Andria (loan)	4	(0)
2020–2021	Team Altamura	25	(0)
2021–2022	Francavilla	26	(2)
2022	Afragolese 1944	5	(0)
2022–2024	Martina	46	(5)
2024–2025	Campodarsego	23	(0)
2025–	Brindisi	6	(0)
- * Club domestic league appearances and goals as of 14:21, 11 October 2025 (UTC)

Aboubacar Langone Soumahoro (born 5 July 2000) is a footballer who plays as a midfielder for Italian Eccellenza club Brindisi FC. Born in the Ivory Coast, Langone emigrated to Italy and was adopted, becoming an Italian citizen.

== Early years ==
Aboubacar was born in Daloa, Ivory Coast, but fled his country during the Second Ivorian Civil War. Aboubacar had already lost his father, and lived under harsh circumstances together with his mother, his sisters and brothers. He moved to various African countries, including Mali, where he worked in a shop for three years. He worked in several countries to raise money so he could move to Europe.

Via Libya, he crossed the desert by himself at age 14 with other people on a makeshift vehicle. He then stopped for a year and a half to work on a construction site. By boat, he arrived in Italy in 2016 and stayed in several reception centers, before ending up in Paterno, Basilicata.

Living in Paterno, Aboubacar began training with Picerno. He was later signed, and made his debut with the under-17. FIFA, however, didn't approve of the transfer for bureaucratic reasons. He remained in Picerno and a family decided to adopt him. Aboubacar became an Italian citizen on 2 March 2018, and changed his last name to Langone, the surname of his adoptive father Francesco. He was then registered once again for Picerno, this time with green light from FIFA.

== Club career ==
=== Picerno ===
After a few years at the youth teams, Aboubacar went on a trial at Serie B club Perugia in March 2018. However, he ended up returning to Picerno. Aboubacar got his official debut for Picerno in the Serie D on 4 August 2018, against Team Altamura. Aboubacar made four appearances that season.

In the 2018–19 season, Aboubacar made 23 league appearances and scored three goals, helping Picerno with promotion to the Serie C.Aboubacar Langone at TuttoCalciatori.net (in Italian) However, he found little space in the 2019–20 season, with only one appearance, and was loaned out to Serie D club Fidelis Andria in January 2020 for the rest of the season.

=== Team Altamura ===
On 3 September 2020, Aboubacar joined Serie D club Team Altamura. He made his debut on 27 September 2020, against Audace Cerignola.

=== Francavilla ===
On 17 August 2021, it was confirmed that Aboubacar had moved to fellow league club F.C. Francavilla. He made his debut against Brindisi FC on 19 September 2021.

=== Afragolese ===
On 6 September 2022, Langone moved to Serie D club Afragolese 1944.

=== Martina ===
On 16 December 2022, Langone moved to Serie D club Martina.

=== Campodarsego ===
In July 2024 Langone moved to another Serie D club; ACD Campodarsego.

=== Brindisi ===
On 31 July 2025, Langone joined Eccellenza club Brindisi FC.

== Honours ==
Picerno

- Serie D Group H: 2018–19
