= Wilmot Pilsbury =

English painter

Wilmot Pilsbury (21 April 1840 – 1908) was an English watercolourist and art teacher.

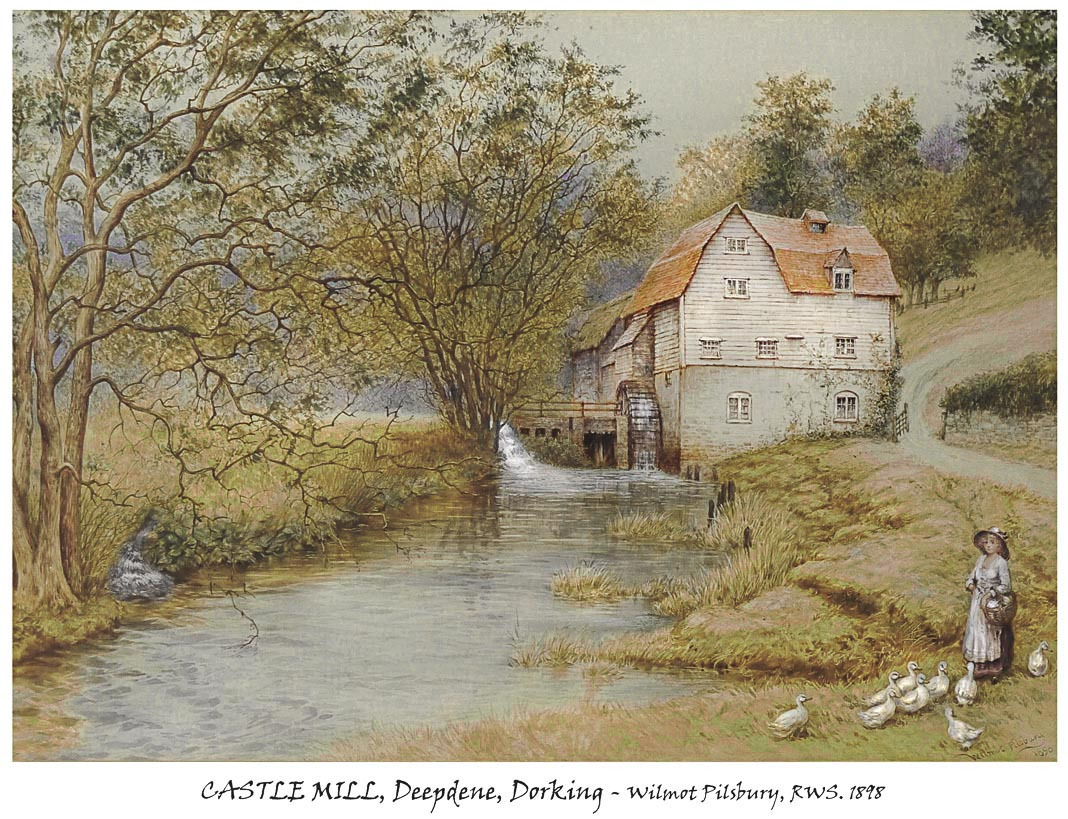
Castle Mill, River Mole, Deepdene, Dorking by Wilmot Pilsbury

== Life ==
Pilsbury was born in Cannock Chase, and studied at Birmingham School of Art under James William Walker from 1853 to 1859. He then moved on to train as an art master at a training school in South Kensington. Following his qualification, he joined the West London School of Art, where he became the deputy headmaster until leaving in 1870. In 1870 he opened the Leicester School of Art, where he served as headmaster until 1881. His pupils included Charles James Adams and George Samuel Elgood.

He painted landscapes in the style of Helen Allingham.
