= Purity Distilling Company =

Defunct chemical firm

- Headquarters: Boston Massachusetts, United States
- Owner: United States Industrial Alcohol Company

The Purity Distilling Company was a chemical firm based in Boston, Massachusetts specializing in the production of ethanol through the distillation process. It was a subsidiary of United States Industrial Alcohol Company who purchased the company in 1917.

== Great Molasses Flood ==
In 1919, one of its largest molasses tanks, which was built in 1915, collapsed at 529 Commercial Street. It was a huge tank (50 ft tall, 90 ft diameter, 283 ft around) and held as much as 2,300,000 US gal (8,700 m^{3}) of molasses. This led to the Boston Molasses Disaster in the North End neighborhood of Boston. Twenty-one people died, and the cleanup took about 6 months to complete, after which the company was sued and forced to pay over $1 million (equivalent to $18,600,000 in 2025) in settlement claims.
