= United States Industrial Alcohol Company =

Former US distiller, owner of tank which caused the Boston molasses disaster

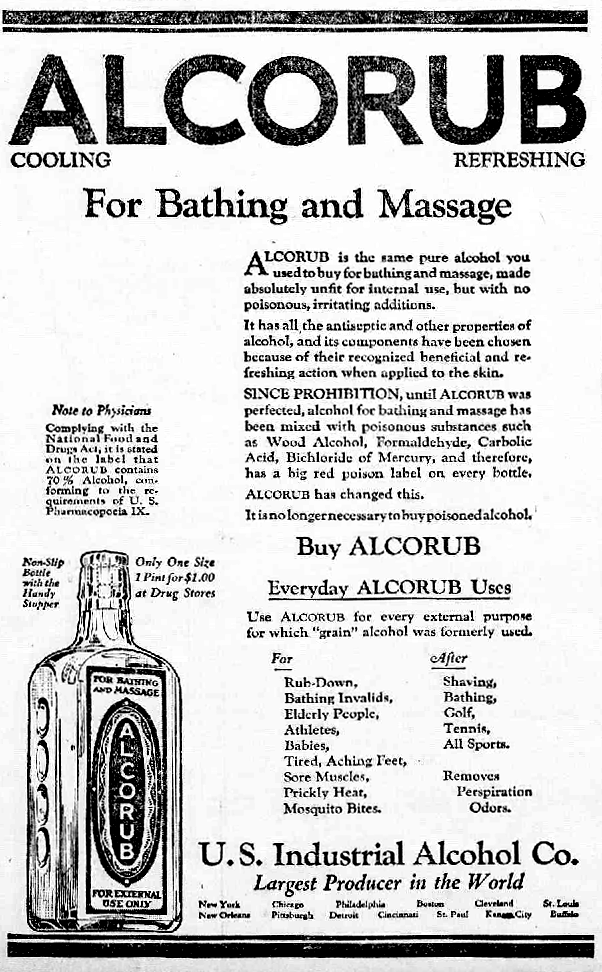
Alcorub product. Made by the Company during Prohibition as a pure alcohol with no denaturants.

United States Industrial Alcohol Company was an alcohol distiller in the United States. Charles Edward Adams, was chairman of the board. In 1919, they were held responsible for the Boston Molasses Disaster, through their subsidiary, the Purity Distilling Company. 125 lawsuits were filed against the company in the aftermath.
