= Sagay Marine Reserve =

Marine reserve in Philippines

Coordinates: 10°54′N 123°25′E

The Sagay Marine Reserve is a protected area in the Philippines, located in Sagay, Negros Occidental. It was established in 1999 to protect marine life in Carbin and Maca reefs. It is the largest marine reserve in the Philippines, covering an area of 32,000 hectares (79,000 acres).

== History ==
=== 2024 molasses spill ===
On August 7, 2024, molasses from MT Mary Queen of Charity, a ship that was carrying over 300 metric tons of the syrup, leaked into the waters off Sagay Feeder Port, causing a 1.3-hectare (3.2-acre) water discoloration within the marine reserve.

== See also ==
- List of protected areas of the Philippines
- Honolulu molasses spill
