= Charles Francis Adams =

Charles Francis Adams may refer to:

- Charles Francis Adams Sr. (1807–1886), grandson of John Adams, son of John Quincy Adams, U.S. congressman, ambassador
- Charles Francis Adams Jr. (1835–1915), son of above, American Civil War general and president of the Union Pacific Railroad
- Charles Francis Adams III (1866–1954), nephew of above, U.S. Navy secretary
- Charles Francis Adams IV (1910–1999), son of above, president of Raytheon
- Charles Adams (ice hockey) (1876–1947), grocery magnate and founder of the Boston Bruins

== See also ==
- Charles F. Adams-class destroyer
- USS Charles F. Adams (DDG-2)
- Charles Adams (disambiguation)
- Adams (surname)
