= ACD Campodarsego =

Italian football club

Campodarsego
- Full name: A.C. Reschigliano (1974–2002); A.C.D. Alta Padovana (2002–2007); Associazione Calcio Dilettantistico Campodarsego (2007–)
- Founded: 1974; 52 years ago 2002 (refound)
- Ground: Stadio Comunale Gabbiano, Campodarsego, Italy
- Capacity: 1,200
- Chairman: Daniele Pagin
- Manager: Alessandro Ballarin
- League: Serie D Group C
- 2023–24: Serie D Group C, 5th of 18
Home colours	Away colours

Associazione Calcio Dilettantistico Campodarsego is an Italian association football club located in Campodarsego, Veneto. It currently plays in Serie D.

== History ==
The club was founded in 1974 as A.C. Reschigliano. In 2002 the A.C. Reschigliano, rests with U.S. Campodarsego, giving life to the team A.C.D. Alta Padovana. In 2007 the team changed its name to A.C.D. Campodarsego. In 2015, for the first time in its history, achieved promotion to Serie D.

In 2019–20, Campodarsego for the first time in its history won promotion to Serie C, but later the club announced that it definitely renounced promotion because of economic problems.

== Colors and badge ==
Its colors are red and white, from 1974 to 2002 and from 2007 to present. From 2002 to 2007 the colors was red and blue.

== Players ==
=== Current squad ===
Note: Flags indicate national team as defined under FIFA eligibility rules; some limited exceptions apply. Players may hold more than one non-FIFA nationality.

No.	Pos.	Nation	Player
—	DF	GRE	Nikos Nikolopoulos
—	MF	CIV	Aboubacar Langone

== Honours ==
- Serie D/C: 1

2019-20

- Coppa Italia Serie D: 1

2017-18

- Eccellenza Veneto/A: 1

2014-2015
