= Ella Spicer =

New Zealand visual artist

- Born: Eleanor Juliet Adams; 1876; Lawrence, New Zealand
- Died: 1958 (aged 81–82)
- Known for: Painting
- Spouse: J. E. D. Spicer

Eleanor 'Ella' Juliet Spicer (née Adams, 1876 – 1958) was a New Zealand artist. Her work is included in the collection of the Museum of New Zealand Te Papa Tongarewa, Turnbull library and Hocken library.

== Personal life ==
Born in Lawrence, New Zealand in 1876, she was the daughter of Charles William Adams. Although she moved to Wellington in 1907, Spicer was primarily based in Auckland.

== Career ==
Spicer studied painting in Dunedin, under Fanny Wimperis and Girolamo Nerli. She began exhibiting from age fifteen and was known for her watercolour painting and landscapes. Up until 1907, when she married John Edward Diggle Spicer, she exhibited under the name Ella Adams.

Spicer exhibited with prolifically within New Zealand including the:

- Auckland Society of Arts from 1907
- Canterbury Society of Arts
- New Zealand Academy of Fine Arts
- Otago Art Society from 1894 to 190 as a working member0
- New Zealand and South Seas Exhibition in Dunedin taking place in 1925-6

Spicer was the mother of artist Peggy Spicer. She and her daughter traveled together to England and Egypt, with both exhibiting in Cairo.

Her work is included in the collection of the Museum of New Zealand Te Papa Tongarewa, Turnbull and Hocken libraries.
