= Honolulu molasses spill =

2013 molasses spill in Honolulu, Hawaii

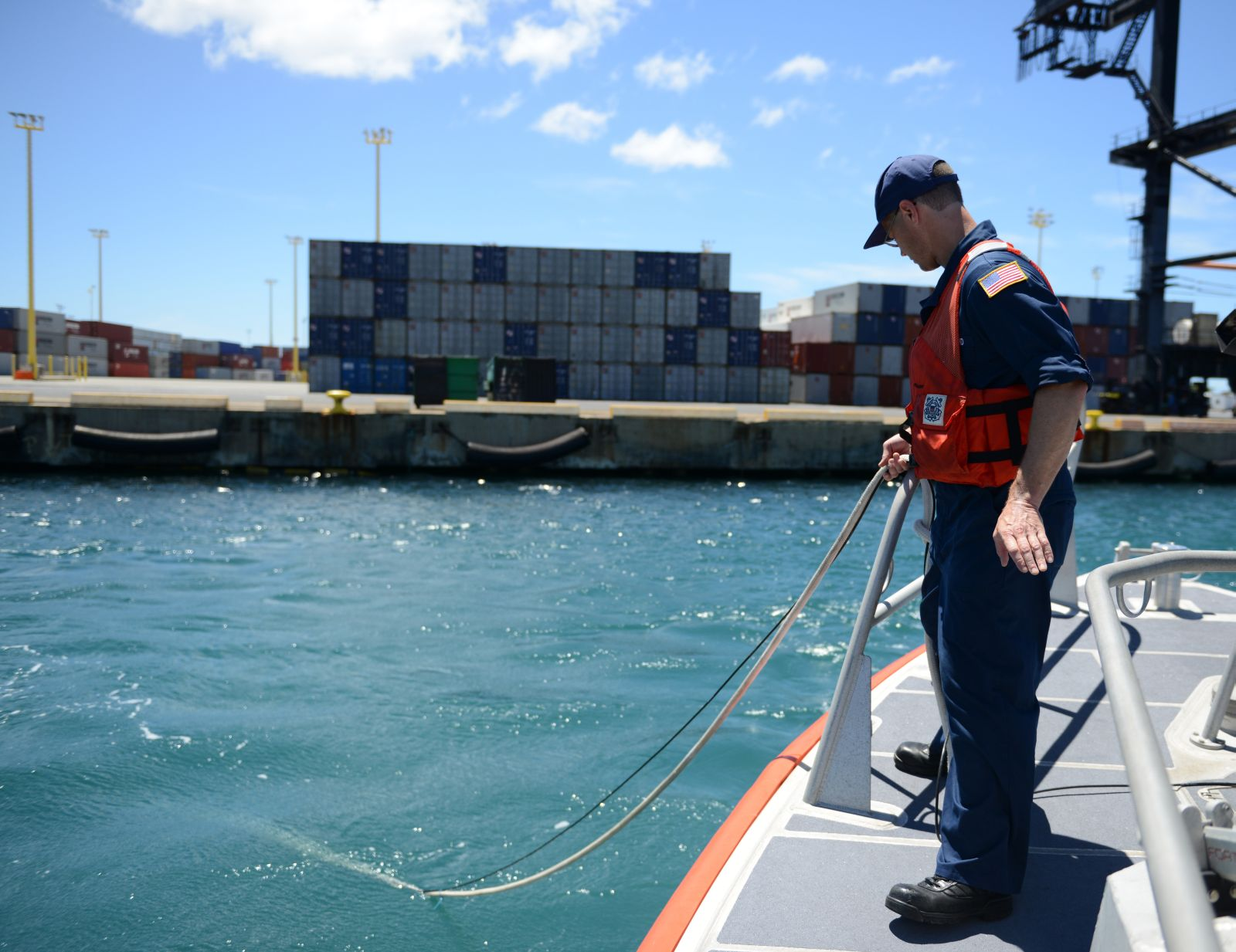
- An officer of the United States Coast Guard collecting oxygen and pH levels in Honolulu Harbor
- Date: September 2013
- Location: Honolulu Harbor; 21.30°N 157.87°W
- Type: Molasses spill
- Cause: Faulty pipe
- Deaths: All sea life in the area
- Property damage: 1,400 tons of molasses

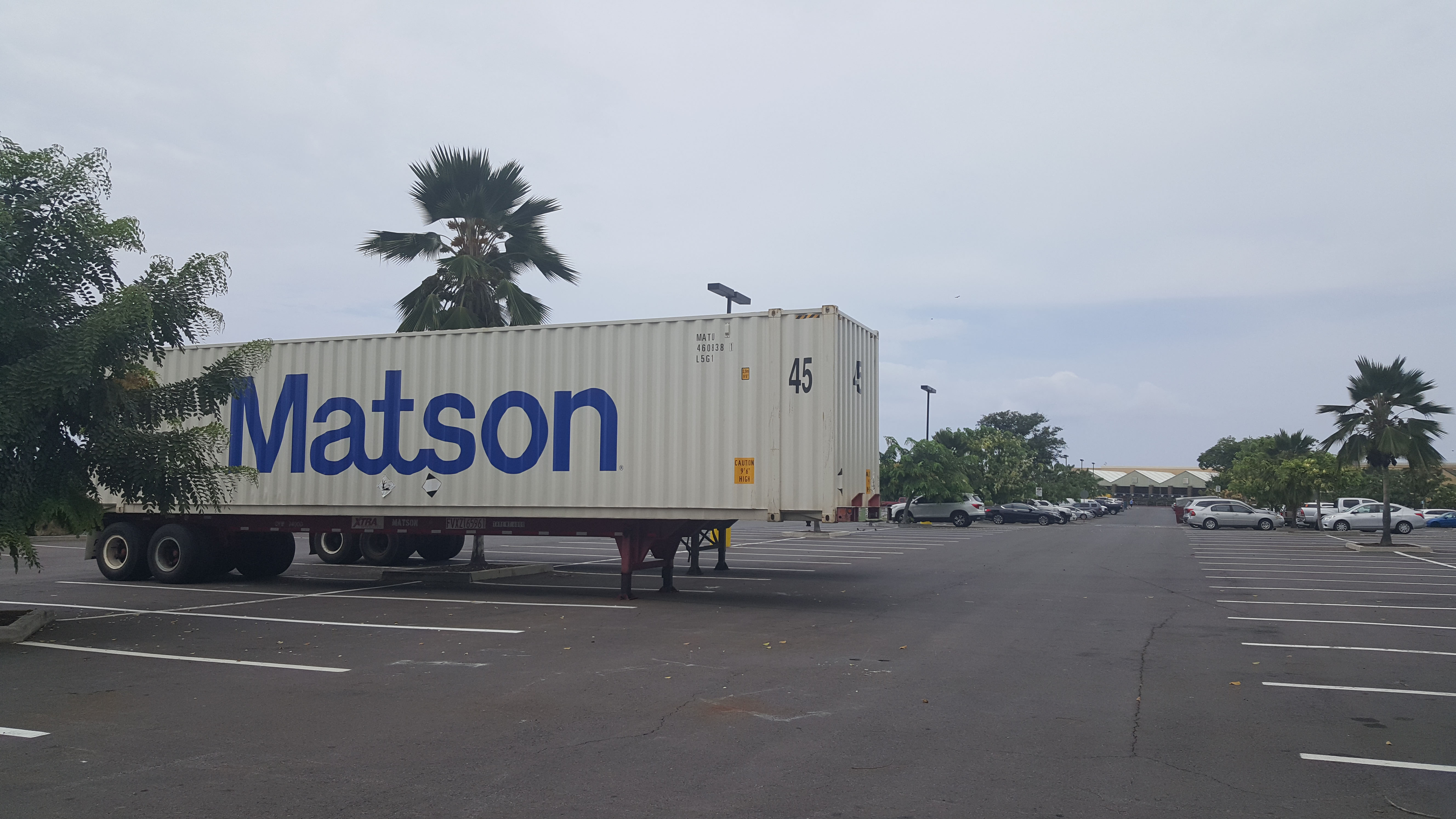
Matson Navigation Company shipping container

In September 2013, 1,400 tons of molasses spilled into Honolulu Harbor in the U.S. state of Hawaii. The spill was discovered on September 9, 2013. It was caused by a faulty pipe that malfunctioned while the molasses was being loaded onto a ship, for which the shipping company Matson Navigation Co. took responsibility.

Evidence collected during the subsequent investigation suggested that the accident could have been avoided entirely. According to Randy Grune, a Department of Transportation Deputy Director, he sent Matson Navigation Co. a letter in July 2012 notifying them of a leak in their faulty pipe after he had inspected the ship. The senior executive at Matson, Vic Angoco, claimed that the company performed their own inspections on the pipeline and did not find any leaks. However, Grune claimed that the leak he pointed out in 2012 was in the same spot that the pipe burst open when the incident occurred, resulting in 233,000 US gallons (880,000 litres) of molasses being spilled into the sea. Molasses is an unregulated product, and neither Matson nor government officials had a contingency plan for responding to a molasses spill.

Natural currents and weather were expected to eventually dilute and flush the molasses out of the harbor and a nearby lagoon. Right after the spill occurred, environmentalists shifted their focus to how this much molasses would affect the commercial harbor area. Ke'ehi Lagoon and Beach Park were also areas of concern. Divers in the harbor area reported that all sea life in the area had been killed by the molasses, which instantly sank to the bottom of the harbor and caused widespread deoxygenation. More than 26,000 fish and members of other marine species suffocated and died, and 17,000 corals of various species were also estimated to have been killed. One diver named Roger White was sent down into the harbor to investigate the extent of the damage caused by the molasses, and his findings were as follows: "It was shocking because the entire bottom is covered with dead fish. Small fish, crabs, mole crabs, eels. Every type of fish that you don't usually see, but now they're dead. Now they're just laying there. Every single thing is dead. We're talking in the hundreds, thousands. I didn't see one single living thing underwater".

== Firsthand accounts ==
This was a new challenge for environmentalists, as molasses acts in a much different manner than more commonly spilled substances such as oil. Dave Gulko, a State of Hawaii biologist who was on site after the spill, stated: "Unlike an oil spill, which can be cleaned by skimming the surface, the molasses quickly disperses to the deepest points. It's sucking up all the oxygen." In an interview with National Geographic, Roger Smith, a scuba instructor who owns Cool Blue Scuba in Honolulu, gave an account of what he saw after the spill. Smith reported the following: "Usually the water has a greenish hue from the algae. But when I dove, it was brown, almost like a cola color. The molasses sunk down to the bottom, and it kind of blanketed everything. It sucks the oxygen out of the water. Every living thing is usually hiding in a hole. But every living thing came out and was gasping to live. Crabs, fish, worms, feather dusters... everything was just laying out in the bottom, just dead. The bigger fish had died, but they had gone to float to the top. The smaller fish were just on the floor."

== Why was there so much molasses in Honolulu? ==
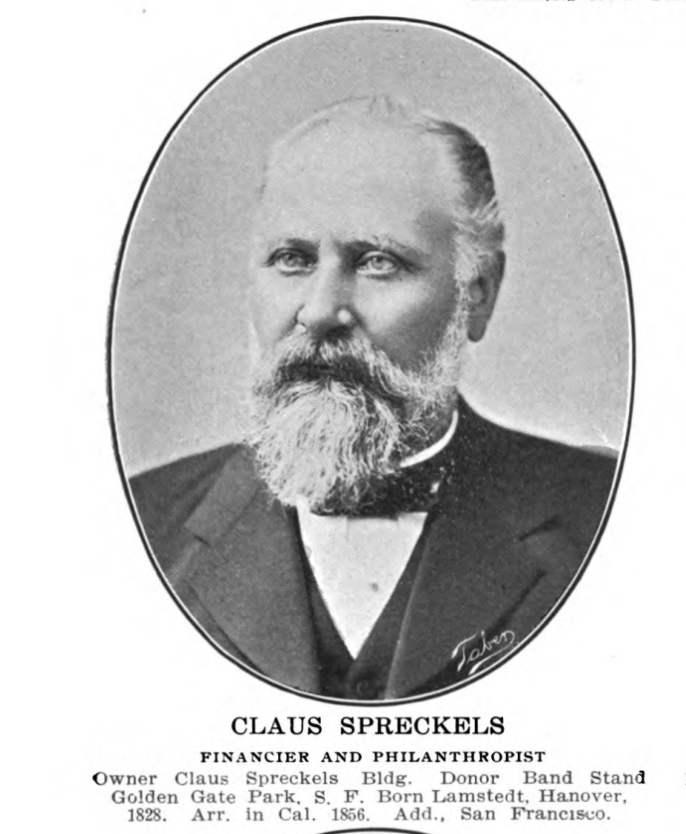
Claus Spreckels, owner of Hawaiian Commercial & Sugar Company

The Hawaiian Commercial & Sugar Company, which was founded in 1878 by Claus Spreckels, owns and cultivates sugarcane on 36,000 acres in Maui. With this much sugarcane, the company can produce around 200,000 tons of raw sugar and 60,000 tons of molasses per year. All of the excess molasses that is not used for livestock feed is shipped to California to be sold in grocery stores. The shipping company that transported this excess molasses was Matson Navigation Company, who had been transporting molasses from Honolulu Harbor for 30 years, and at the time was shipping it about once a week.

== Aftermath ==
There was never any danger towards humans due to the molasses, unlike in the Great Molasses Flood (or Boston Molasses Flood) of 1919, which killed 21 people and injured 150 others. Rather, the danger of the Honolulu molasses spill was caused by the presence of the molasses in the water, as it drastically increased the amount of bacterial growth due to the new abundance of sugar. Other potential adverse effects included the risk of increased predation from sharks, barracudas, and eels due to the copious amounts of deceased prey, and of the excessive growth of marine algae, which presents its own plethora of negative environmental impacts.

Some compared the Honolulu molasses spill to an oil spill due to the widespread devastation to marine life and ecosystems that both induce. However, the cleanup process for a molasses spill is quicker and more efficient than that of oil spills. By nature, molasses is able to mix with water, and due to this fact, the bacteria that essentially do all the cleanup are able to access the molasses more readily than in an oil spill, where oil tends to form large globules or clumps that are immiscible in water. The other factor that aids in molasses cleanup is the wide variety of bacteria that are able to break down the sugar, compared to the relatively small number of bacteria that are capable of breaking down petroleum hydrocarbons.

== Follow-up ==
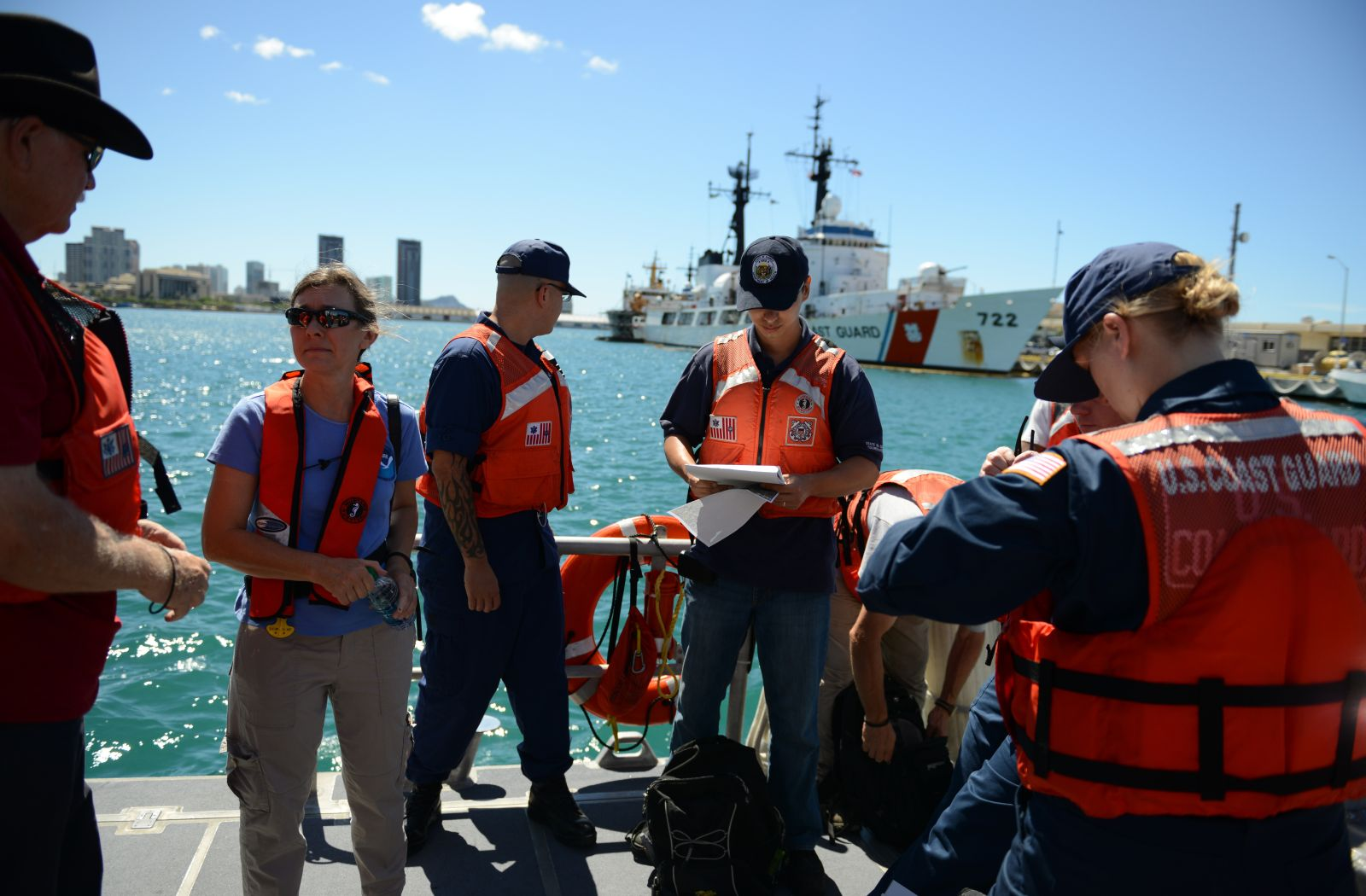
Members of the US Coast Guard discussing an action plan following the molasses spill

On September 20, 2013, the Hawaii Department of Transportation issued an order that all businesses which pump products through port pipelines must provide the state with documentation about pipeline inspections and spill response plans. Previously no such reporting had been required. Since such spills are almost impossible to clean up, the plan focuses on prevention and early detection, with regular inspections of pipelines and hourly monitoring of transmission operations.

In 2015, in response to the spill, the Environmental Protection Agency and Matson Navigation Co. reached a $15.4 million settlement. The settlement included $5.9 million to regrow a coral nursery, reimburse the state for all costs of the response to the spill, and contribute to the International Union for Conservation of Nature's World Conservation Congress. The other $9.5 million was intended to cover the costs to remove the molasses tank farm and pier risers, to safely dispose of said tank farm and pipelines, and to convert the remaining portions of pipeline for uses other than transporting liquids. This settlement and the resulting actions effectively marked the end of Hawaii's sugar industry.

== See also ==
- List of non-water floods
- Great Molasses Flood
- Negros Occidental molasses spill
