= Copp's Hill Terrace =

- U.S. National Register of Historic Places
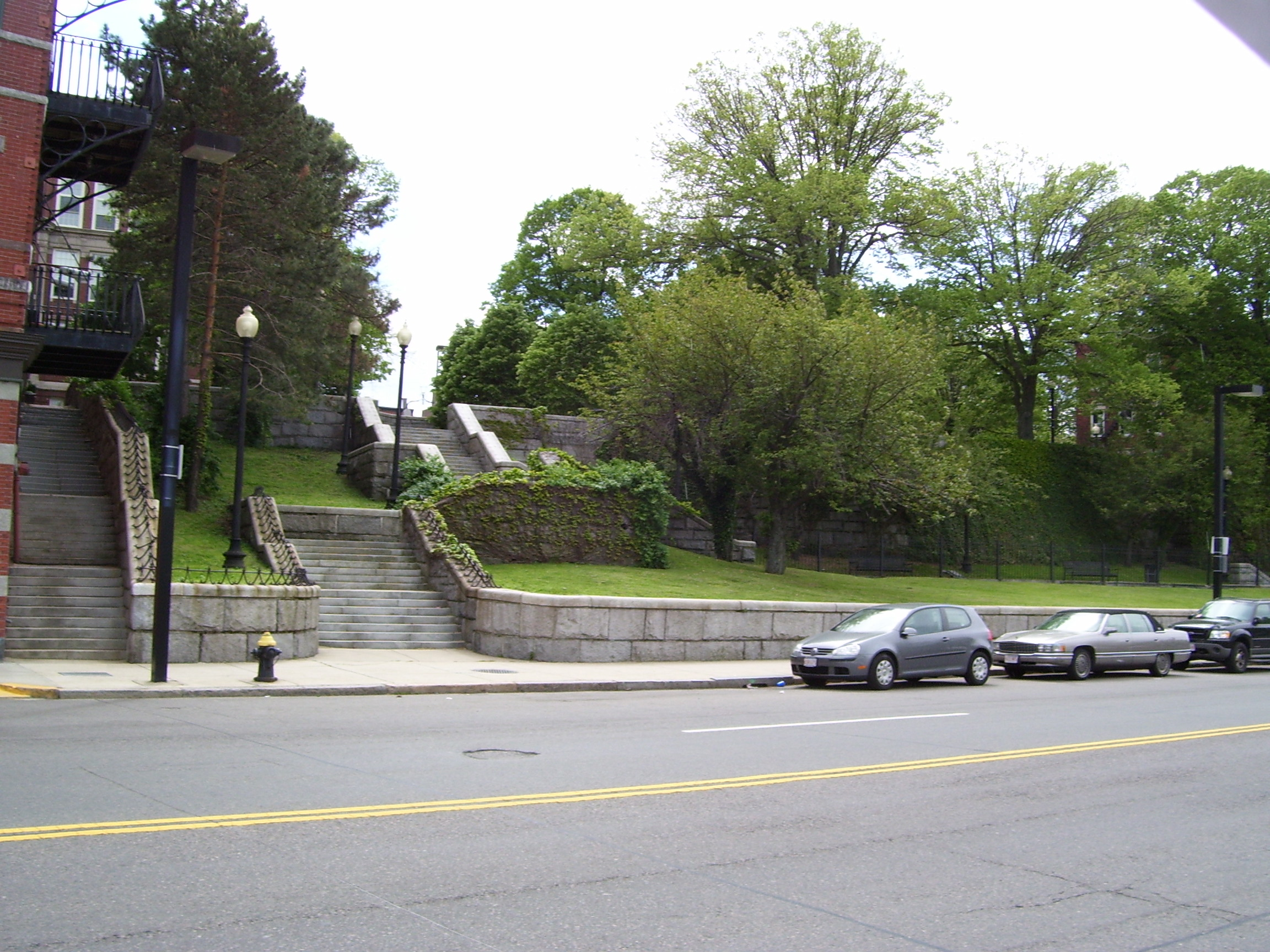

- Location within Boston Location within Massachusetts Location within the United States
- Location: Copp's Hill, North End, Boston, Massachusetts
- Coordinates: 42°22′4.12″N 71°3′19.62″W
- Area: less than one acre
- Built: 1893
- Architect: Eliot, Charles; Perkins & White
- NRHP reference No.: 90000631
- Added to NRHP: April 19, 1990

Copp's Hill Terrace is a historic terrace and park between Commercial and Charter Streets west of Jackson Avenue on Copp's Hill in the North End of Boston, Massachusetts near Copp's Hill Burying Ground. Designed and built in the 1890s, it is the only public park designed for the city by the noted landscape architect Charles Eliot, and one of the few larger public spaces in the densely-built North End. It was added to the National Register of Historic Places in 1990.

== Description and history ==
Copp's Hill is the highest point in Boston's North End and the third-highest point in the city, after Beacon Hill and Roxbury's Fort Hill. Copp's Hill Terrace is set on the north side of the hill, which slopes steeply to the waterfront of Boston's inner harbor. The Terrace is separated from the waterfront area by Commercial Street and Langone Park, the latter originating in the same park planning process that produced the Terrace. The Terrace consists of a landscaped arrangement of granite steps, knee-walls and banisters with cast-iron parapets ascending to a large plaza overlooking Commercial Street and the mouth of the Mystic River. The Copp's Hill Burying Ground lies immediately south of the Terrace.

A small community of free African Americans lived on the steep slope of Copp's Hill from the 17th to the 19th century. Members of this community were buried in the Copp's Hill Burying Ground. By the late 19th century, much of the land in the area was owned by the Boston Gas Light Company, and the hillside was crowded with tenement houses. Funding to develop this area as a city park was secured in the early 1890s by John "Honey Fitz" Fitzgerald, then a city counselor and later its mayor. The city took land down to the waterfront by eminent domain in 1893. The area, including what was first called North End Park and is now Langone Park, was intended by designer Charles Eliot to provide both passive and active recreation opportunities, giving the local residents a respite from the otherwise crowded conditions. Although his early designs were more informal, city leaders prevailed for a more formal design, which was eventually implemented. The final construction included grassy areas and trees, and included conduits for the provision of electric lighting.

From the terrace, a large crowd observed the destruction wrought by Boston's Great Molasses Flood of 1919.

== Images ==
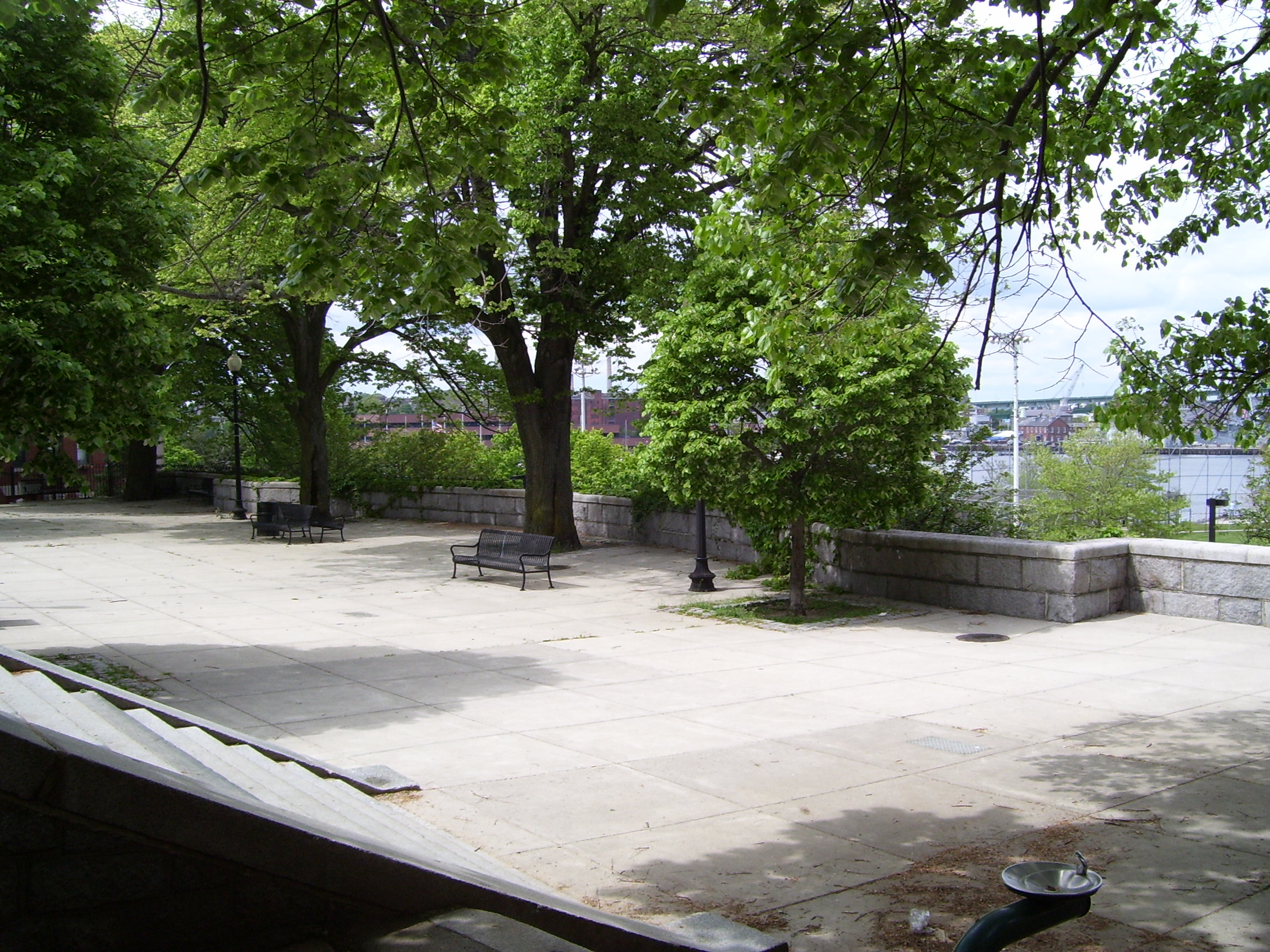
Copp's Hill Terrace

== See also ==
- National Register of Historic Places listings in northern Boston, Massachusetts
