= Charles Adam (disambiguation) =

Charles Adam (1780–1853), was a British naval officer.

Charles or Charlie Adam may also refer to:

- Sir Charles Elphinstone Adam, 1st Baronet (1859–1922) of the Adam baronets
- Charles Wilson Adam (1848–1924), Scottish engineer and first president of Recreativo de Huelva
- Charlie Adam (born 1985), Scottish international football midfielder
- Charlie Adam (footballer, born 1919) (1919–1996), Scottish football outside left
- Charlie Adam (footballer, born 1962) (1962–2012), Scottish football midfielder, father of the footballer born 1985

== See also ==
- Charles Adams (disambiguation)
