= George Samuel Elgood =

English painter

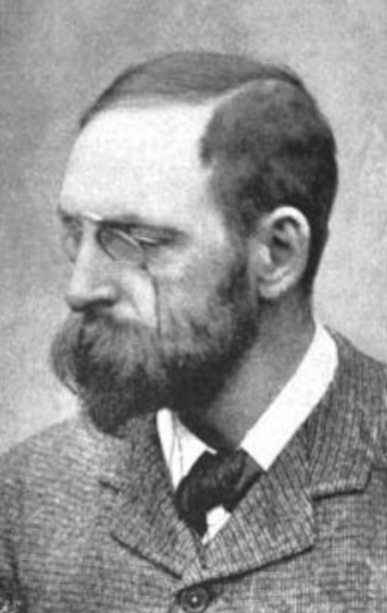
- In The Sketch, 27 March 1895
- Born: 26 February 1851; Leicester, Leicestershire, England
- Died: 21 October 1943 (aged 92); Tenterden, Kent, England
- Education: South Kensington Schools
- Occupations: Artist, illustrator
- Spouse: Mary Wellington Clephan (m. 1881)

George Samuel Elgood (26 February 1851 – 21 October 1943) was an English artist and illustrator who became well known for his paintings of formal gardens. He painted mainly in watercolour.

== Biography ==
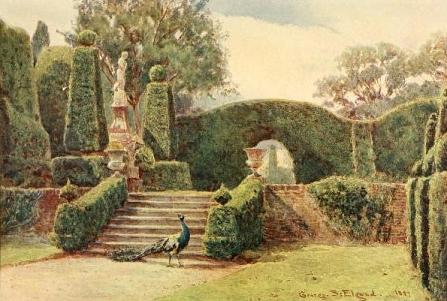
The Terrace, Brockenhurst House (from Some English Gardens

Elgood was born in Leicester, Leicestershire on 26 February 1851, one of a family of seven boys and two girls. After a private education at various schools, including Bloxham, he studied art at Leicester Art School under Wilmot Pilsbury, and then architectural drawing at the South Kensington Schools in London.

Elgood's father died in 1874 necessitating a return home to look after the family business, although he continued to paint part-time. He went on painting expeditions and holidays with his art school tutor Pilsbury, and had some lessons from local artist John Fulleylove who was his brother-in-law, as well as travelling and painting with his wife, Mary Wellington Clephan, who was also an artist.

In the early 1880s, he was free to resume art full-time, becoming a member of the Royal Institute of Painters in Water Colours (RI) in 1882 and the Royal Institute of Oil Painters (ROI) a few years later. He exhibited several times at the Fine Art Society between 1890–1925.

Elgood became known mainly as a painter of historic gardens, travelling throughout England, France, Spain and Italy in the course of his professional life. Many of his pictures were used to illustrate Some English Gardens (1904) by the famous garden designer Gertrude Jekyll and Italian Gardens (1907) which Elgood wrote himself.

In 1908 he settled in an old 16th-century timbered house called "Knockwood" in Tenterden, Kent, where he designed and constructed his own formal garden in the grounds. He also designed and had constructed a farmhouse (in a vernacular style) and two local war memorials.

He died at Knockwood on 21 October 1943.

Among other museum collections, Nottingham City Museums and Galleries have a group of works bequeathed by Miss J.O.S. Elgood in 1950. His Roses and Pinks at Levens Hall, Kendal, Cumbria, perhaps one of his best-known paintings, realised £9,600 at Christie's in 2007, with another garden view realising £6,600.

== Bibliography ==
Illustrated by Elgood:

- Gertrude Jekyll. Some English gardens (Longmans, Green & Co., 1904).
- Elgood, George S. Italian Gardens (Longmans, Green and Co., 1907)

About Elgood

- Eckstein, Eve. George Samuel Elgood: His Life and Work (Alpine Fine Arts Collection, 1994).
