= Langone Park =

Park in Boston, Massachusetts

Coordinates: 42.3686°N 71.0559°W

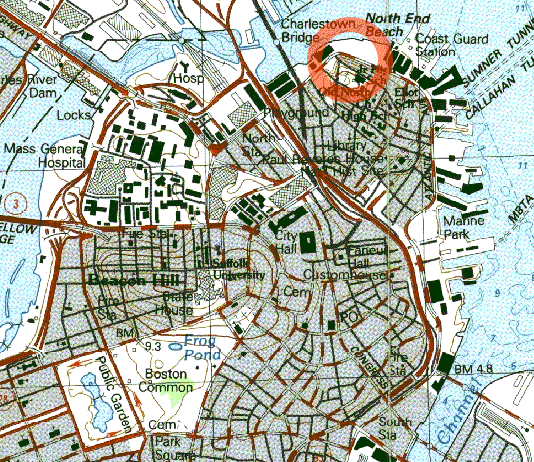
Location of the park and the site of the Great Molasses Flood

Langone Park is a waterfront park in the North End of Boston, Massachusetts. Established in 1973, it is named for Massachusetts state senator Joseph A. Langone, Jr. and his wife Clementina Langone. The park features a Little League Baseball field, a playground, and three bocce courts. It is located on Commercial Street at the edge of Boston Harbor, immediately to the west of the Andrew P. Puopolo Jr. Athletic Field.

The first park at the location, North End Beach (later North End Park), was established in 1893 as a public bathing facility.

The park includes much of the area inundated by the 1919 Great Molasses Flood.

To the southwest the park borders Copp's Hill Terrace and further south is Copp's Hill Burial Ground. Both sites are listed on the National Register of Historic Places. In October 2019, the third box from The Secret treasure hunt was discovered by three construction workers, after which credit was given to Jason Krupat, who had identified the exact location of the box beforehand and informed the workers to be on the lookout—a story that was featured on the Expedition Unknown TV series hosted by Josh Gates.
