= Charles J. Adams (U.S. Air Force general) =

United States Air Force general

- Born: August 22, 1921; Sanpete County, Utah, US
- Died: May 28, 2002 (aged 80); Los Angeles, California, US
- Military career
- Allegiance: United States
- Branch: United States Army; United States Air Force
- Service years: 1942–1973
- Rank: Brigadier general
- Units: 5th Fighter Squadron; 322d Strategic Reconnaissance Squadron
- Commands: 44th Strategic Missile Wing; 821st Strategic Aerospace Division
- Conflicts: World War II; Korean War
- Awards: Legion of Merit; Distinguished Flying Cross; Air Medal; Air Force Commendation Medal

Charles J. Adams (August 22, 1921 – May 28, 2002) was a brigadier general in the United States Air Force.

== Early life and education ==
Adams was born in Sanpete County, Utah, in 1921. He attended the University of Utah for three years before enlisting in the army in 1942, and completed his studies at the University of Nebraska at Omaha, where he received a bachelor's degree in 1957.

== Career ==
Adams originally enlisted in the U.S. Army in 1942. He was commissioned an officer the following year. After receiving his commission, he served as a flying instructor at Walnut Ridge Army Airfield until 1944, when he was transferred to the 5th Fighter Squadron. During his time with the 5th, he served in the China Burma India Theater of World War II.

Following the war, Adams was assigned to Kelly Field, before joining the Ronne Antarctic Research Expedition. With the expedition, he would help to chart the Antarctic coastline. He would also transfer to the Air Force after its inception.

During the Korean War, Adams was assigned to the 322d Strategic Reconnaissance Squadron, piloting a North American B-45 Tornado. He returned with the squadron to the United States as a Boeing B-47 Stratojet commander and was later named deputy director of operations of the 91st Strategic Reconnaissance Wing.

In July 1955, he was assigned to Strategic Air Command at Offutt Air Force Base and in 1958, entered the field of missiles and helped to establish Vandenberg Air Force Base. At Vandenberg, Adams trained crews in the SM-65 Atlas.

From 1962 to 1967, Adams was assigned to The Pentagon, including serving for a time as chief, Strategic Division, Directorate of Studies and Analysis in the Office of the Deputy Chief of Staff of the Air Force. He later assumed command of the 44th Strategic Missile Wing and the 821st Strategic Aerospace Division before returning to The Pentagon in 1971, at which time he was named deputy director for strategic forces in the Office of the Deputy Chief of Staff.

Awards he received include the Legion of Merit, the Distinguished Flying Cross, the Air Medal, the Air Force Commendation Medal, the Distinguished Unit Citation and the Republic of Korea Presidential Unit Citation.

== Retirement and death ==
Adams' retirement was effective as of February 1, 1973.

He died on May 28, 2002, in Los Angeles, California.
