= Charles Edward Adams (industrialist) =

American industrialist and director of the Federal Reserve Bank of New York

Charles Edward Adams (29 October 1881 – 27 January 1957) was an industrialist and a director of the Federal Reserve Bank of New York.

== Biography ==
He was born on 29 October 1881 in Toledo, Ohio. He graduated from St. Paul's School and Yale with an A.B. in 1904, where he was a member of Skull and Bones. After his graduation, he spent three years as secretary to the banker Robert C. Pruyn. In 1907, he entered the brokerage firm F. S. Butterworth & Co., then moved to Callaway Fish & Co. in 1910. He briefly joined Foster & Adams and became treasurer of the Air Reduction Co. in 1918. He rose through the ranks of the company, eventually becoming chairman in 1937. Adams served on the boards of a number of companies, including the United States Industrial Alcohol Company, Pur Carbonic, Inc., Dry Ice, Inc., the Cuban Air Products Corp., and served as a trustee for Mutual Life. The highest point in his career came when he was made a director of the Federal Reserve Bank of New York. During World War II, Adams held several positions within the government. In 1940, he consulted the Council of National Defense on industrial materials. He served on the National Defense Mediation Board and headed the iron and steel branch of the War Production Board.

His father, Charles Frederick Adams was a bank manager and his daughter, Phyllis Adams was a producer with NBC. He was a member of Alpha Delta Phi, Chemists' Club of New York, the Cloud Club of New York, Down Town Association, Skull and Bones, The Links Club of New York, Union Club of New York, and the Uptown Club of New York City.

He died on 27 January 1957.
