= Charles Adams (rugby union) =

Irish rugby union player

- Born: 8 December 1883 Co. Dublin, Ireland
- Died: 13 November 1965 (aged 81) Malahide, Ireland

Rugby union career
- Position: Forward
International career
Years	Team	Apps	(Points)
1908–14	Ireland	16	(3)

Charles Adams (8 December 1883 — 13 November 1965) was an Irish international rugby union player.

A forward, Adams played his club rugby for Old Wesley and was capped 16 times by Ireland from 1908 to 1914, before his international career was effectively ended by World War I. He served with the 7th Battalion of the Dublin Fusiliers in Gallipoli and Salonika. In 1917, Adams was captured by the Germans and held as a prisoner of war.

== See also ==
- List of Ireland national rugby union players
