= Charles Joseph Adams =

American academic and professor of religion

- Born: April 24, 1924; Houston, Texas
- Died: March 23, 2011 (aged 86); Mesa, Arizona
- Education: Baylor University
- Scientific career
- Fields: Islamic studies
- Institutions: McGill University
- Doctoral students: Abdolhadi Haeri

Charles Joseph Adams (April 24, 1924 – March 23, 2011) was an American academic and professor of religion. He was emeritus Professor of Islamic Studies at McGill University and for nearly 20 years the Director of the Institute of Islamic Studies there.

== Life ==
Adams was born in Houston, Texas, in 1924. His undergraduate education was at Baylor University, which was interrupted when he volunteered to serve in the Air Force during World War II as an airborne radio operator and mechanic. After the war he returned to Baylor to earn his B.A.

His long career at McGill University began when he joined the faculty in 1952. Adams the historian of religion turned his head more particularly toward Islam when, under a Ford Foundation Grant, he studied Islam in Pakistan. He returned to McGill to join the new Institute of Islamic Studies, and later served as its director from 1964 to 1980.

Adams died on March 23, 2011, in Mesa, Arizona.
