= Adoption in Italy =

Adoptions in Italy numbered 4,130 in 2010. This figure relates to overseas adoptions, domestic adoption from within Italy being relatively difficult.

In 2006 there were 11,000 couples in Italy on the waiting lists of various adoption agencies.

== Adoptive process ==
As in most jurisdictions, prospective adoptive parents are required to undergo assessment and must show that they will make suitable parents. Italian law requires adopters to be married (or living together) for at least 3 years. There are also restrictions on the age difference between the prospective parents and the child or children they wish to adopt. On 22 June 2016, the possibility of stepchild adoption by LGBT couples was confirmed by the Court of Cassation in a decision published on 22 June 2016. However, Italian law prohibits adoption by single parents, unless one of the parents inherited custody of the child through either legal separation or death of a spouse. Since 2025, international adoption is possible for single women.

== Countries of origin ==
According to statistical data published by the Italian Commissione per le Adozioni Internazionali, 2010 was the year with the highest number of international adoptions by Italian couples. The Commission for International Adoptions, chaired by Undersecretary Senator Carlo Giovanardi, granted entry in Italy to 4130 children from 58 countries, up from 3964 in 2009 (4.2% increase), 639 of which were special needs children.

The first country of origin is the Russian Federation with 707 children, but there was a particularly high increase in the number of children from Colombia, who numbered 592 compared to 444 of 2009. Colombia is therefore the second largest country of origin, followed by Ukraine with 426 adoptions, Brazil with 318, Ethiopia with 274, Vietnam with 251 and Poland with 193.

There was a significant increase of children from Latin America (+16.34%) and Asia (+34.71%) despite changes in domestic laws taking place in countries such as Vietnam, Cambodia and Nepal. Children from African countries numbered 443.

== Regional variation and age ==
The Italian region with the highest number of adoptions is Lombardy, followed by Lazio, Tuscany and Veneto, but a significant increase was noted in the Southern regions, especially Campania, Apulia, Calabria and Sardinia. The only region where international adoptions in 2010 decreased by 14% was Sicily.

Foreign children adopted by Italian couples in 2010 were on average 6 years old, up from 5.9 in 2009.

== See also ==
- Adoption in ancient Rome
