= Charles James Adams =

English artist

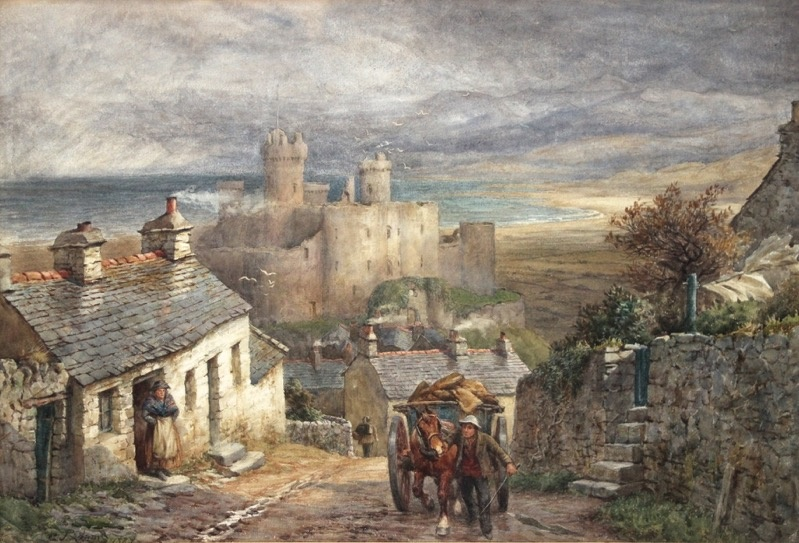
Charles James Adams - Harlech Castle with horse and cart on a blustery day. Watercolour.

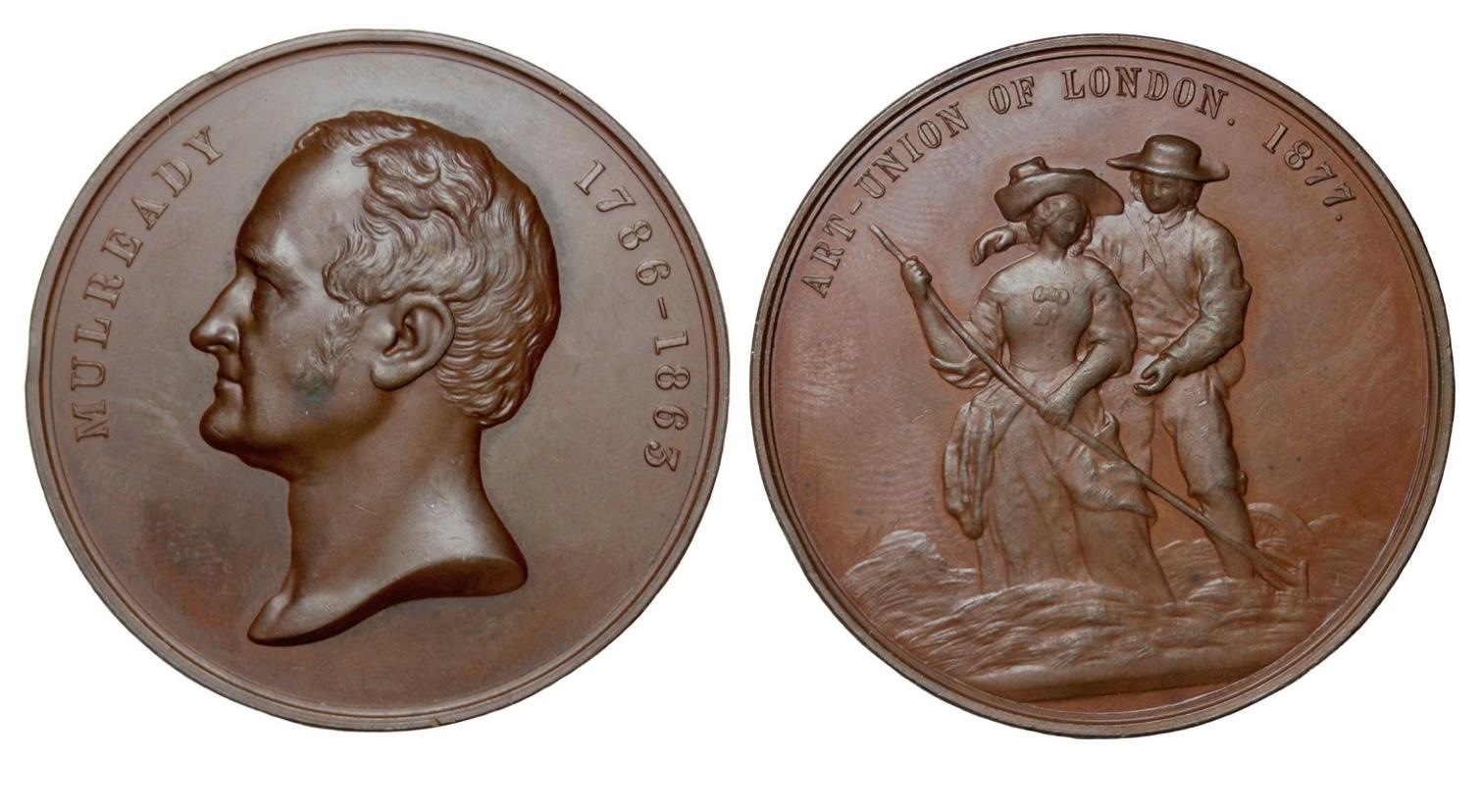
Example of the 'Mulready Medal' awarded by the Society of Arts, London.

Charles James Adams (1859–1931) was an English landscape artist born in Gravesend, Kent, and second child of Charles Adams and his wife Sarah (née Crisp). Charles studied at Leicester School of Art (now De Montfort University) under Wilmot Pilsbury, where he won the Mulready Gold Medal for Life Drawing from the Society of Arts, London. A prolific artist of landscapes with animals (notably sheep and horses), genre and historical subjects, he painted mainly in oils, although produced a number of lithographs and was also an extremely accomplished watercolourist. He lived in various parts of England, including Leicester 1891 (teaching at the School of Art), Sydenham London 1895, Horsham Surrey 1897, Billingshurst 1900 and Midhurst 1901 in West Sussex, Guildford Surrey 1904 and finally settling in Farnham Surrey 1905 until his death on 8 November 1931, aged 72.

Adams exhibited at the Royal Academy of Arts, Suffolk Street, Royal Institute of Painters in Watercolours, Royal Hibernian Academy, Dublin, the Royal Institute of Oil Painters and Royal Society of British Artists (formerly in Suffolk Street, but now based at the Mall Galleries, London SW1).The Ipswich Fine Art Club (now Ipswich Art Society), Royal Birmingham Society of Artists (established as the Birmingham Society of Artists in 1821). He also exhibited at major provincial galleries including Nottingham Museum and Art Gallery, Manchester Art Gallery (formerly Manchester City Art Gallery), the Walker Art Gallery, Liverpool, and the Dudley Museum and Art Gallery. Examples of his work can be found in Leicester's New Walk Museum & Art Gallery and Brighton Museum & Art Gallery.

His biographical details may be found in The Dictionary of British Artists - Published by the Antique Collectors' Club (2007), The Dictionary of Victorian Painters by Christopher Wood, published also by the Antique Collectors Club, UK (1971), The Dictionary of British Artists by Grant Waters (1975) and The Dictionary of British Watercolour Painters by H. L. Mallalieu (1979).

== Gallery ==
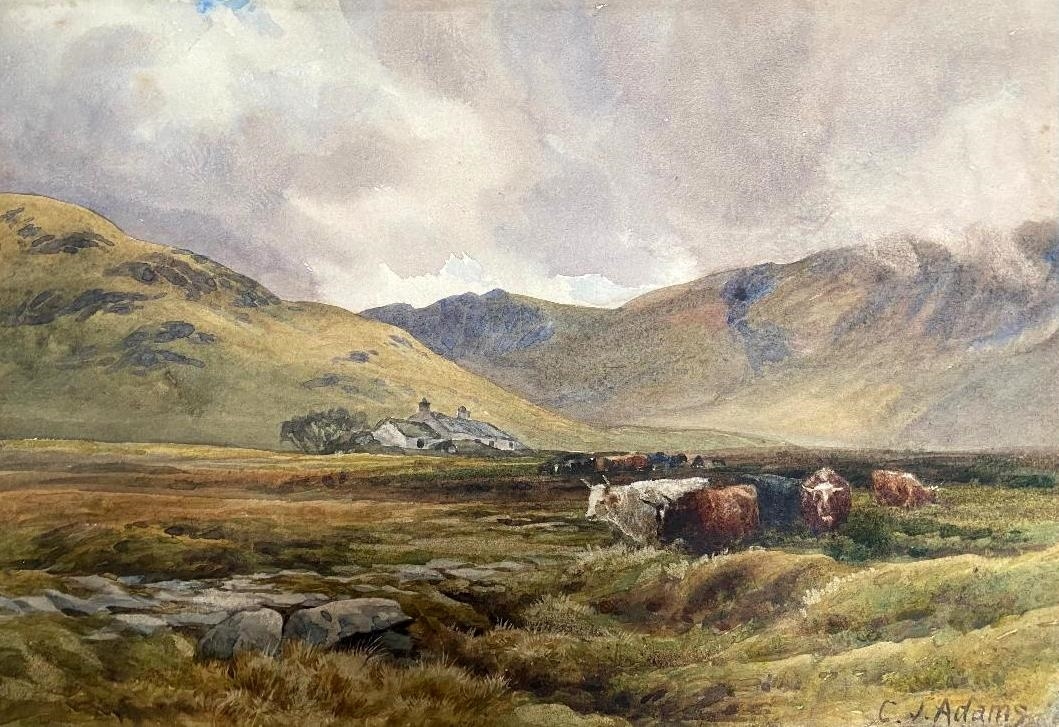
Charles James Adams - Cattle on moorland, North Wales. Watercolour.

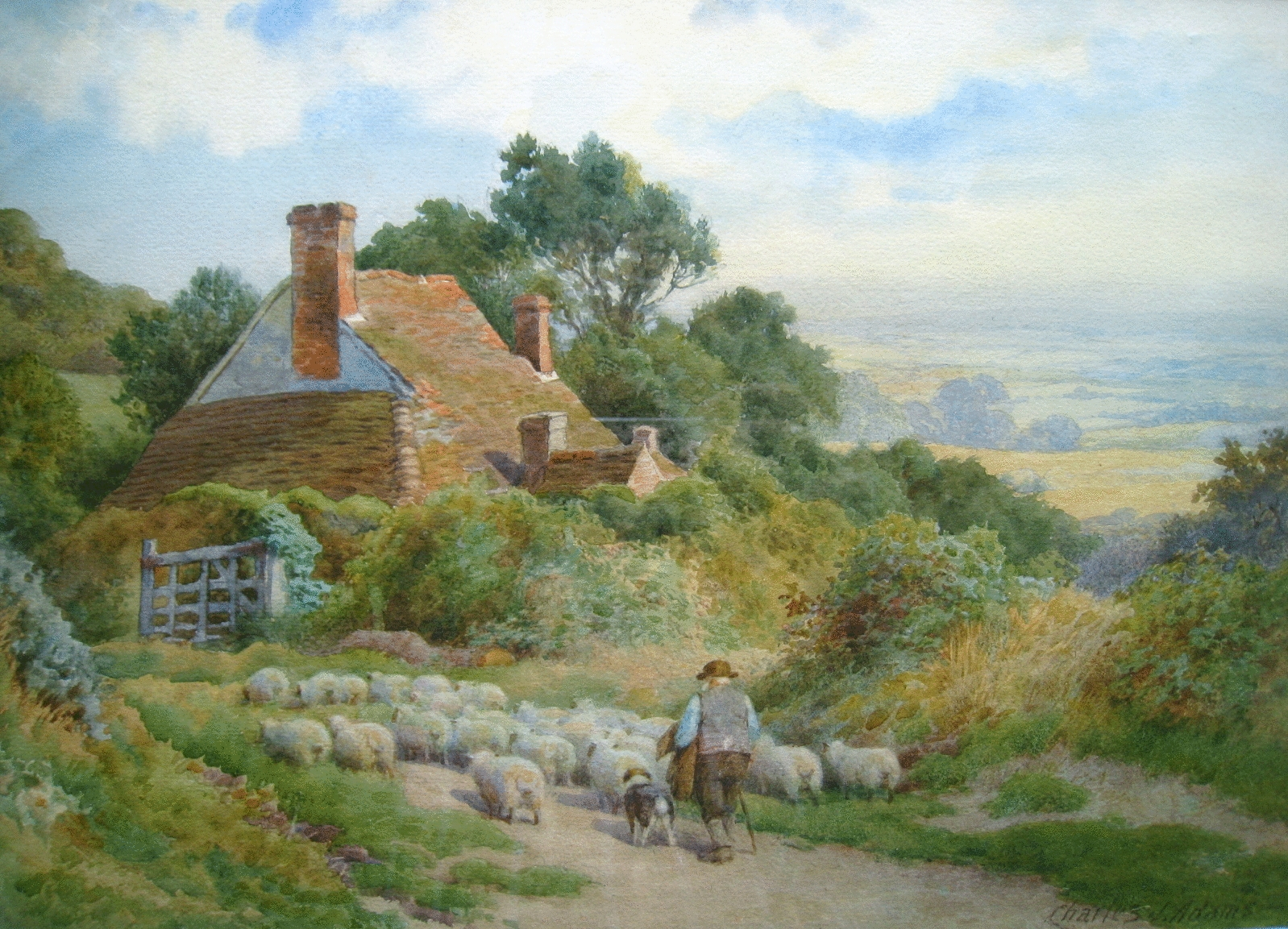
Charles James Adams - Droving sheep down country lane. Watercolour.

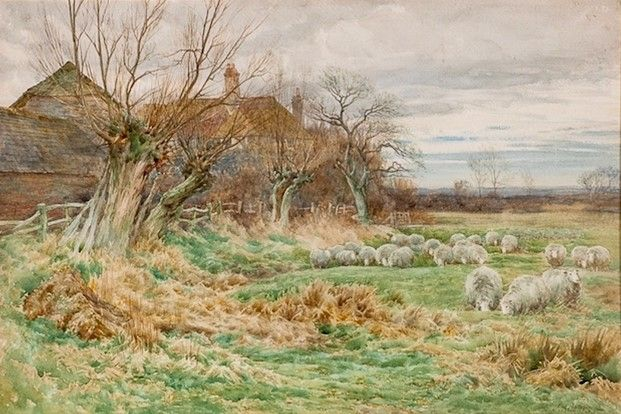
Charles James Adams - Sheep grazing on bleak winter pastureland. Watercolour.

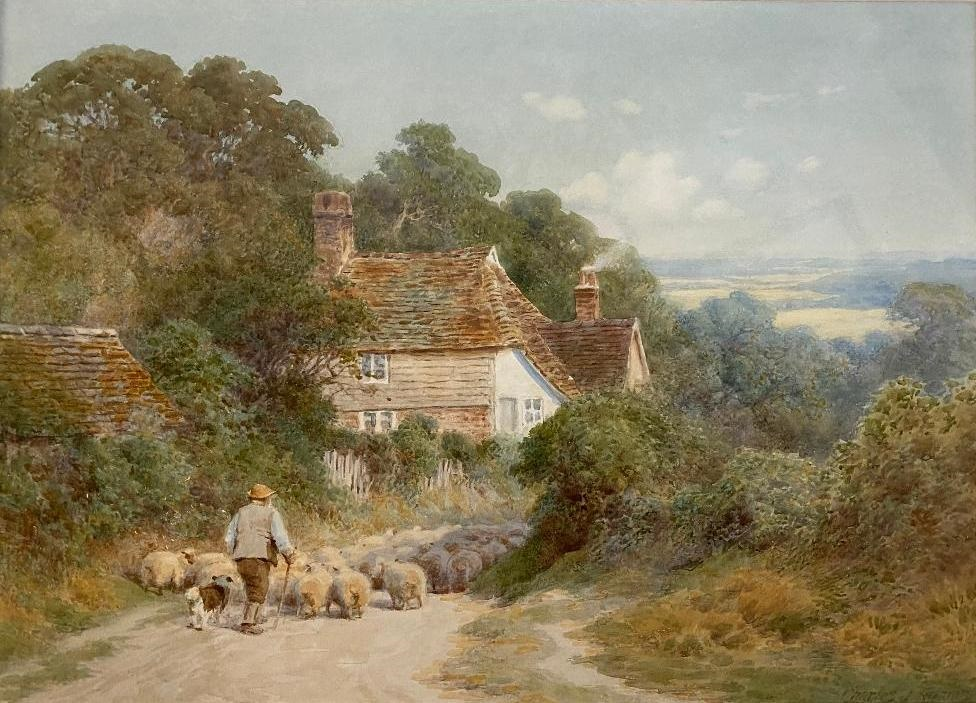
Charles James Adams - Moving pastures. Watercolour.
