= Charles William Adams (surveyor) =

Surveyor, astronomer, public servant (1840–1918)

- Born: 7 July 1840
- Died: 29 October 1918 (aged 78)
- Scientific career
- Fields: Surveying, Astronomy

Charles William Adams (7 July 1840 – 29 October 1918) was a New Zealand surveyor, astronomer and public servant. He was born in Buckland, Tasmania, Australia on 7 July 1840.

His son, Charles Edward Adams, pursued a similar career as a university lecturer, surveyor, astronomer and seismologist. His daughter, Ella Spicer, and granddaughter, Peggy Spicer, were both painters.
