= Clementina Poto Langone =

- Born: Clementina Maria Anna Poto; May 30, 1896; Boston, U.S.
- Died: April 20, 1964 (aged 67); Boston, U.S.
- Resting place: Holy Cross Cemetery; Malden, Massachusetts
- Known for: Activist; Politician; Philanthropist
- Political party: Democrat
- Spouse: Joseph A. Langone, Jr.
- Children: Louise, Joseph, Madeline, Frederick, William, Rita

Clementina Poto Langone (1896–1964) was a civic leader from the North End of Boston who is remembered for her service to the Italian-American community. During the Great Depression she was known as a "Good Samaritan" who distributed food and clothing to the poor and advocated for them politically. As a member of the Massachusetts Board of Immigration and Americanization, she helped hundreds of Italian immigrants assimilate and obtain U.S. citizenship. She served as vice chairman of the Massachusetts Democratic State Committee and as an alternate delegate to the Democratic National Convention.

== Early life ==
Clementina Maria Anna Poto was born in the North End of Boston on May 30, 1896. (Note: Some sources list her birth year as 1896, others as 1898. Census records for 1900 and 1910 list her birth year as 1895 and "abt. 1897" respectively.) Her parents, Luigi Poto and Maddalena Debueris, were Italian immigrants from Castelcivita, Salerno. As a child, she attended Boston public schools and worked in the family grocery store on the first floor of her home. She studied business at Burdett College.

== Career ==
In 1920 she married another North End resident, Joseph A. Langone, Jr., son of Massachusetts state legislator Joseph A. (Giuseppe Antonio) Langone. In addition to raising six children and doing volunteer work in the community, she helped run the Langone family's funeral home on North Street. When Nicola Sacco and Bartolomeo Vanzetti were executed in 1927, they were laid out at the Langone funeral home, where they were viewed by over ten thousand mourners, and the funeral procession drew many thousands more. The Boston Globe called it "one of the most tremendous funerals of modern times."

During the Great Depression, Clementina Langone collected food and clothing for the poor and distributed them from her living room. Langone, who was bilingual, was especially helpful to Italian immigrants, many of whom spoke little or no English. In addition to helping them materially, she listened to their problems and explained to them how to get WPA jobs and other help from the government. She encouraged them to apply for U.S. citizenship so that they would be eligible for social security. As her reputation grew, people flocked to her house to ask for help, sometimes upward of 75 per day. She often spoke at political meetings and actively supported government aid to the poor.

She also found time to campaign for her husband. A gifted organizer, she helped get her husband elected to the Massachusetts state senate in 1932. (In his autobiography, sociologist William Foote Whyte, who spent time with the Langone family when he was studying the North End, refers to Clementina Langone as "the candidate's wife and the real brains in the family.") He narrowly defeated six Irish-American candidates, ending years of Irish political domination in his district, which included East Boston, Charlestown, and the North, West, and South Ends. He went on to serve four consecutive terms, and was Boston Election Commissioner in several James Michael Curley administrations.

Clementina Langone volunteered for many years as one of six members of the Massachusetts Board of Immigration and Americanization, helping Italian immigrants become U.S. citizens. (Note: According to several sources, she served for twenty years. According to the 1964 annual report of the Division of Immigration and Americanization, it was "over fifteen years".) She was an alternate delegate to the Democratic National Convention from Massachusetts in 1936, 1940, 1944, and 1948. In 1936 she campaigned for Franklin D. Roosevelt, and in 1944 she seconded the nomination of Harry Truman for Vice President. She was president of the Salerno Women's Society; a member of the Professional and Business Women's Lodge (Order of the Sons of Italy), the guild of the Home for Italian Children, and the North End Union; and vice chairman of the women's division of the Massachusetts Democratic State Committee. (Note: According to her Boston Globe obituary, she was "formerly vice chairman of the Democratic State Committee." She is pictured in a 1937 newspaper article about a regional conference of the women's division of the DNC with the caption, "Lower right—A few of the national committeewomen and state vice chairmen.")

== Honors and awards ==
Langone and her husband were widely known and appreciated in the Boston area. In 1940, over 5,000 people attended a testimonial banquet at Boston Garden in their honor. In attendance were Boston mayor Maurice J. Tobin, Congressman John F. Fitzgerald, Attorney General Paul A. Dever, former Massachusetts governors James Michael Curley and Charles F. Hurley, Springfield mayor Roger Lowell Putnam, Medford mayor John C. Carr, and other Democratic leaders. Mayor Tobin said it was the largest testimonial dinner ever held in Boston. Langone Park on Commercial Street, a waterfront park designed by Frederick Law Olmsted, is named for the couple.

33 North Square, formerly the site of the Poto grocery store where Langone lived and worked as a girl, is a stop on the Boston Women's Heritage Trail. A commemorative plaque at the site reads, "Birthplace of Hon. Clementina Langone, 1897 - 1964, Good Samaritan to all who needed her help, Dedicated Oct. 19, 1991".

== Later years ==
Langone spent her later years in Medford and Winchester, Massachusetts. Her husband died in 1960. One of her children, Joseph A. Langone III, became a Massachusetts state representative, and another, Frederick C. Langone, was a Boston city councilor. She died at Massachusetts General Hospital in Boston on April 20, 1964. According to her son Frederick, her last words were, "Don't forget the people."
