= Great Molasses Flood =

1919 accident in Massachusetts, United States

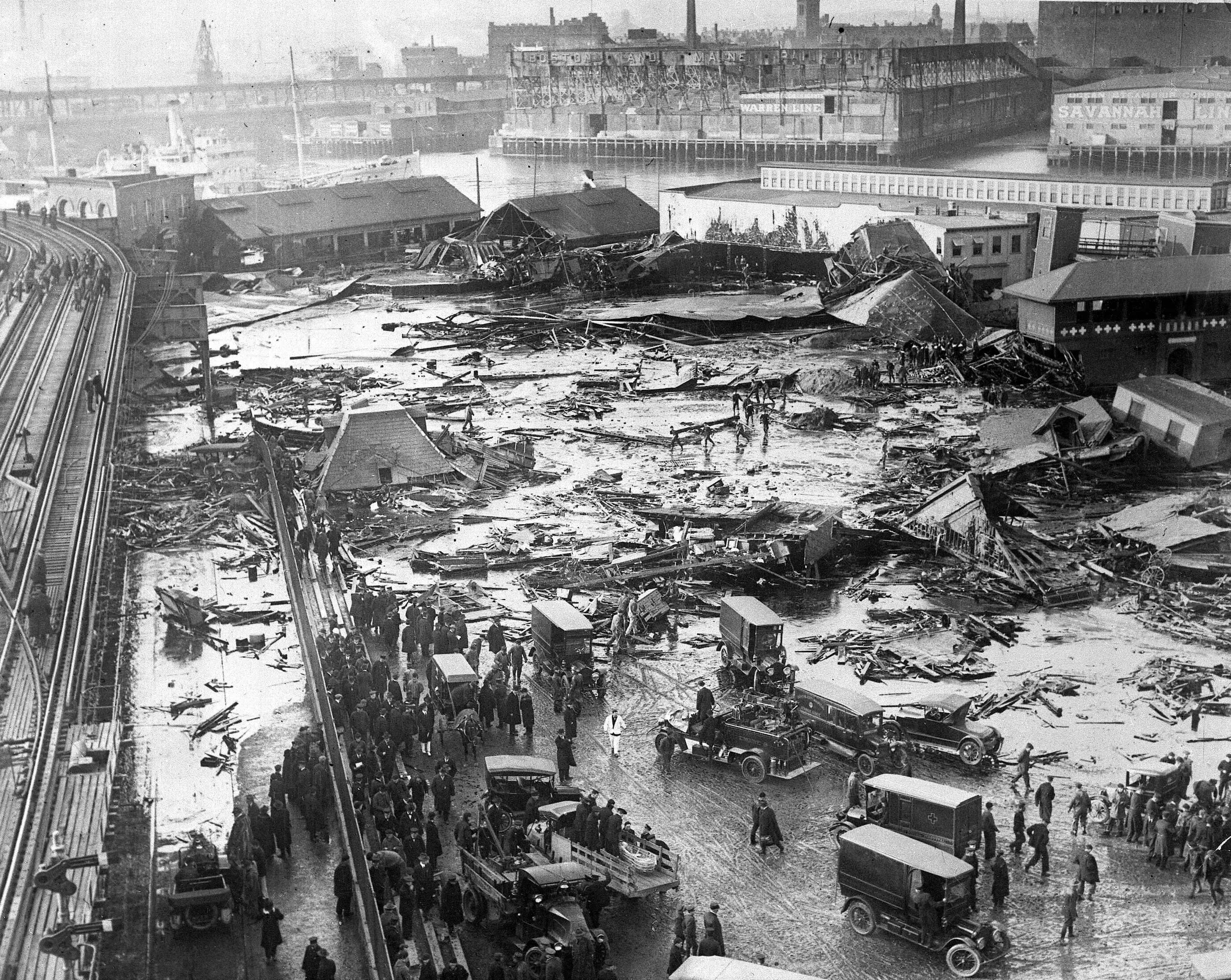
- The wreckage of the collapsed tank is visible in the background, center, next to the light-colored warehouse
- Date: January 15, 1919; 107 years ago
- Time: Approximately 12:30 pm
- Location: Boston, Massachusetts, U.S.; 42°22′06.6″N 71°03′21.2″W
- Cause: Cylinder stress failure
- Deaths: 21
- Injuries: 150 injured

The Great Molasses Flood, also known as the Boston Molasses Disaster, (Note: The flood has more recently been known as the "Boston Molassacre".) was a disaster that occurred on January 15, 1919, in the North End neighborhood of Boston, Massachusetts.

A large storage tank filled with 2.3 million U.S. gallons (8,700 cubic meters) of molasses, weighing approximately (Note: With a density of 1.4 kg/L (12 lb/US gal), 8,700 m^{3} (310,000 cu ft) of molasses weighs 12,180 tonnes (11,990 long tons; 13,430 short tons).) 13,000 short tons (12,000 metric tons) burst, and the resultant wave of molasses rushed through the streets at an estimated 35 miles per hour (56 kilometers per hour), killing 21 and injuring 150 people. Following a two-week long cleanup effort, the event entered local folklore and residents reported for decades afterwards that the area still smelled of molasses on hot summer days.

== Background ==
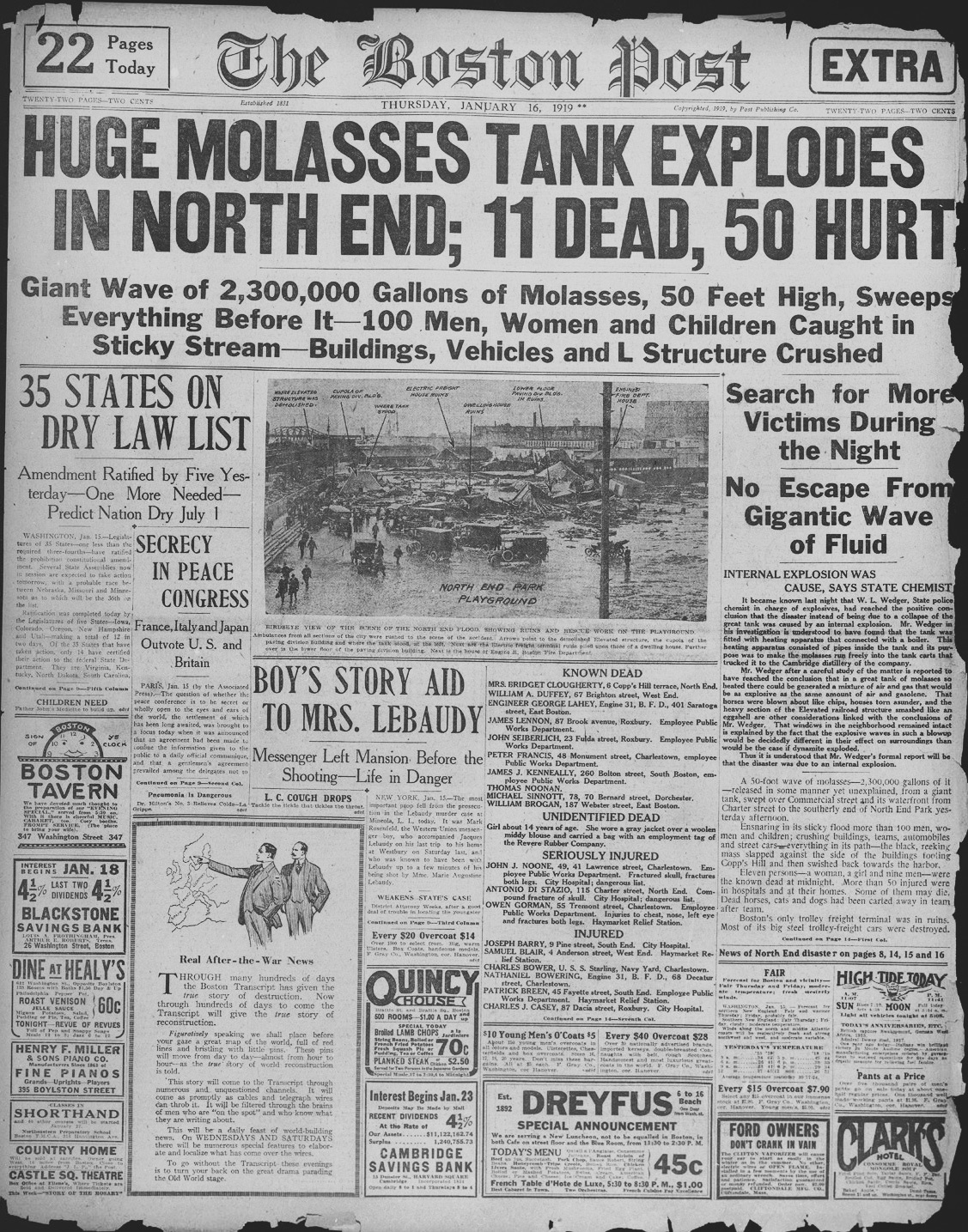
Coverage from The Boston Post

Molasses can be fermented to produce ethanol, the active ingredient in alcoholic beverages and a key component in munitions. The disaster occurred in Boston's North End at the Purity Distilling Company facility at 529 Commercial Street near Keany Square. A considerable amount of molasses had been stored there by the company, which used the Commercial Street tank, located adjacent to Boston Harbor, to offload molasses from ships and store it for later transfer by pipeline to the Purity ethanol plant situated between Willow Street and Evereteze Way in nearby Cambridge. The molasses tank stood 50 feet (15 meters) tall and 90 ft (27 m) in diameter, and contained as much as 2.3 million US gal (8,700 m^{3}).

== Flood ==
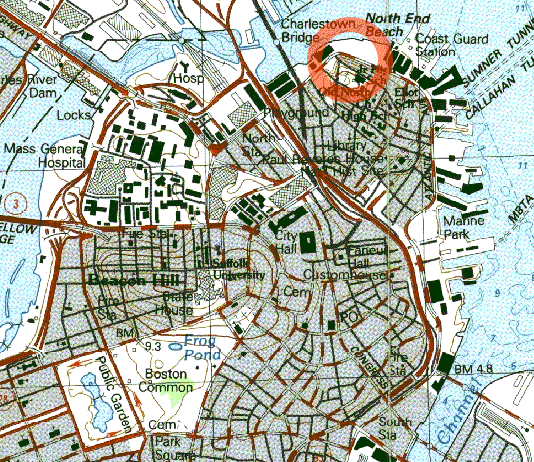
Modern downtown Boston with molasses flood area circled

On January 15, 1919, temperatures in Boston had risen above 40 degrees Fahrenheit (4 degrees Celsius), climbing rapidly from the frigid temperatures of the preceding days. On the previous day, a ship had delivered a fresh load of molasses, which had been warmed to decrease its viscosity for transfer.

Possibly due to the thermal expansion of the older, colder molasses already inside the tank, the tank burst open and collapsed at approximately 12:30 p.m. Witnesses reported that they felt the ground shake and heard a roar as it collapsed, a long rumble similar to the passing of an elevated train; others reported a tremendous crashing, a deep growling, "a thunderclap-like bang!", and a sound like a machine gun as the rivets shot out of the tank.

The density of molasses is about 1.4 metric tons per cubic meter (12 pounds per US gallon), 40% denser than water, resulting in the molasses having a great deal of potential energy. The collapse translated this energy into a wave of molasses 25 ft (8 m) high at its peak, moving at 35 mph (56 km/h). The wave was of sufficient force to drive steel panels of the burst tank against the girders of the adjacent Boston Elevated Railway's Atlantic Avenue structure and tip a streetcar momentarily off the railway's tracks. Stephen Puleo describes how nearby buildings were swept off their foundations and crushed. Several blocks were flooded to a depth of 2 to 3 ft (60 to 90 cm). Puleo quotes a report from The Boston Post:

Molasses, waist deep, covered the street and swirled and bubbled about the wreckage [...] Here and there struggled a form—whether it was animal or human being was impossible to tell. Only an upheaval, a thrashing about in the sticky mass, showed where any life was [...] Horses died like so many flies on sticky fly-paper. The more they struggled, the deeper in the mess they were ensnared. Human beings—men and women—suffered likewise.

As molasses is a non-Newtonian fluid, its viscosity changes under stress, thinning and flowing quickly under pressure and heat. During the flood, this shear-thinning resulted in unexpected speed. A 2013 article in Scientific American stated:

"A wave of molasses does not behave like a wave of water. [...] A wave of molasses is even more devastating than a typical tsunami. In 1919 the dense wall of syrup surging from its collapsed tank initially moved fast enough to sweep people up and demolish buildings, only to settle into a more gelatinous state that kept people trapped."

The Boston Globe reported that people "were picked up by a rush of air and hurled many feet". Others had debris hurled at them from the rush of sweet-smelling air. A truck was picked up and hurled into the harbor. After the initial wave, the molasses became viscous, exacerbated by the cold temperatures, trapping those caught in the wave and making it even more difficult to rescue them. About 150 people were injured, and 21 people and several horses were killed. Some were crushed and drowned by the molasses or by the debris that it carried within. The wounded included people, horses, and dogs; coughing fits became one of the most common ailments after the initial blast. Edwards Park wrote of one child's experience in a 1983 article for Smithsonian:

Anthony di Stasio, walking homeward with his sisters from the Michelangelo School, was picked up by the wave and carried, tumbling on its crest, almost as though he were surfing. Then he grounded and the molasses rolled him like a pebble as the wave diminished. He heard his mother call his name and couldn't answer, his throat was so clogged with the smothering goo. He passed out, then opened his eyes to find three of his four sisters staring at him.

== Aftermath ==
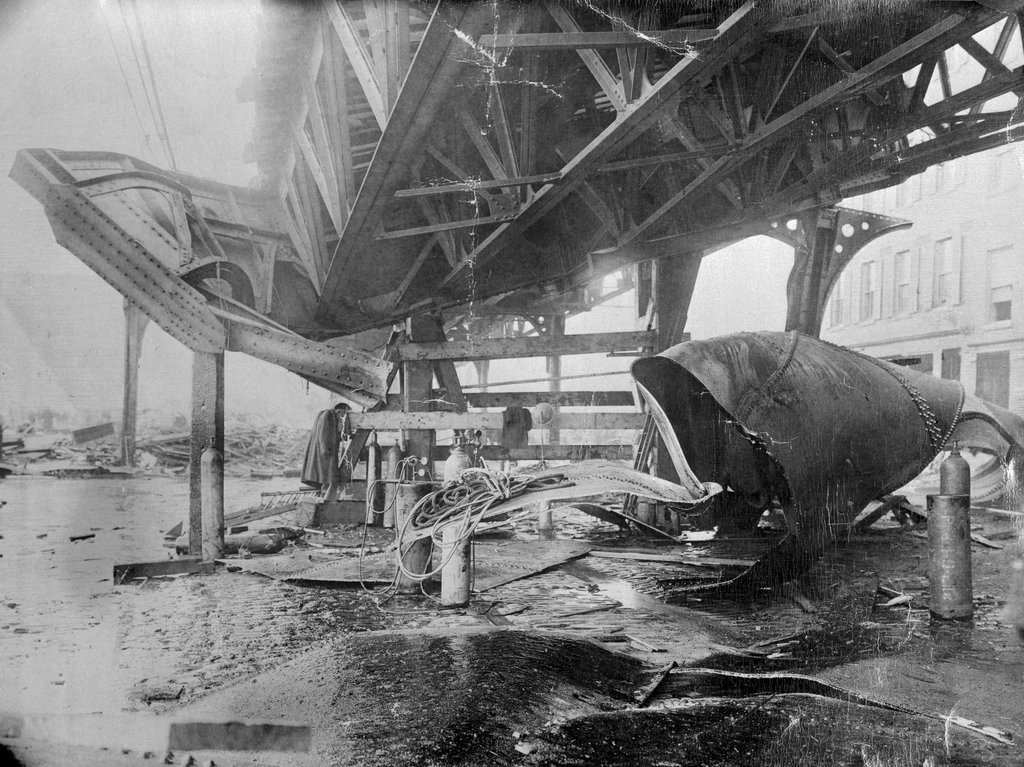
Damage to the Boston Elevated Railway caused by the burst tank and resulting flood

First to the scene were 116 cadets under the direction of Lieutenant Commander H. J. Copeland from USS Nantucket, a training ship of the Massachusetts Nautical School (now the Massachusetts Maritime Academy) that was docked nearby at the playground pier. The cadets ran several blocks toward the accident and entered into the knee-deep flood of molasses to pull out the survivors, while others worked to keep curious onlookers from getting in the way of the rescuers. The Boston Police, the Red Cross, and Army and Navy personnel soon arrived. Some nurses from the Red Cross dove into the molasses, while others tended to the injured, keeping them warm and feeding the exhausted workers. Many of these people worked through the night, and the injured were so numerous that doctors and surgeons set up a makeshift hospital in a nearby building. Rescuers found it difficult to make their way through the syrup to help the victims, and four days elapsed before they stopped searching; many of the dead were so glazed over in molasses that they were hard to recognize. Other victims were swept into Boston Harbor and were found three to four months after the disaster.

In the wake of the accident, 119 residents brought a class-action lawsuit against the United States Industrial Alcohol Company (USIA), which had bought Purity Distilling in 1917. It was one of the first class-action suits in Massachusetts and is considered a milestone in the development of modern corporate regulation. The company claimed that the tank had been blown up by anarchists because some of the alcohol produced was to be used in making munitions, but a court-appointed auditor, Hugh W. Ogden, found USIA responsible after three years of hearings, and the company ultimately paid out $628,000 in damages ($11.7 million in 2025, adjusted for inflation). Relatives of those killed reportedly received around $7,000 per victim (equivalent to $130,000 in 2025).

=== Cleanup ===
Cleanup crews used salt water from a fireboat to wash away the molasses and sand to absorb it, and the harbor was brown with molasses until summer. The cleanup in the immediate area took weeks, with several hundred people contributing to the effort, and it took longer to clean the rest of Greater Boston and its suburbs. Rescue workers, cleanup crews, and sight-seers had tracked molasses through the streets and spread it to subway platforms, to the seats inside trains and streetcars, to pay telephone handsets, into homes, and to countless other places. It was reported that "Everything that a Bostonian touched was sticky."

=== Fatalities ===
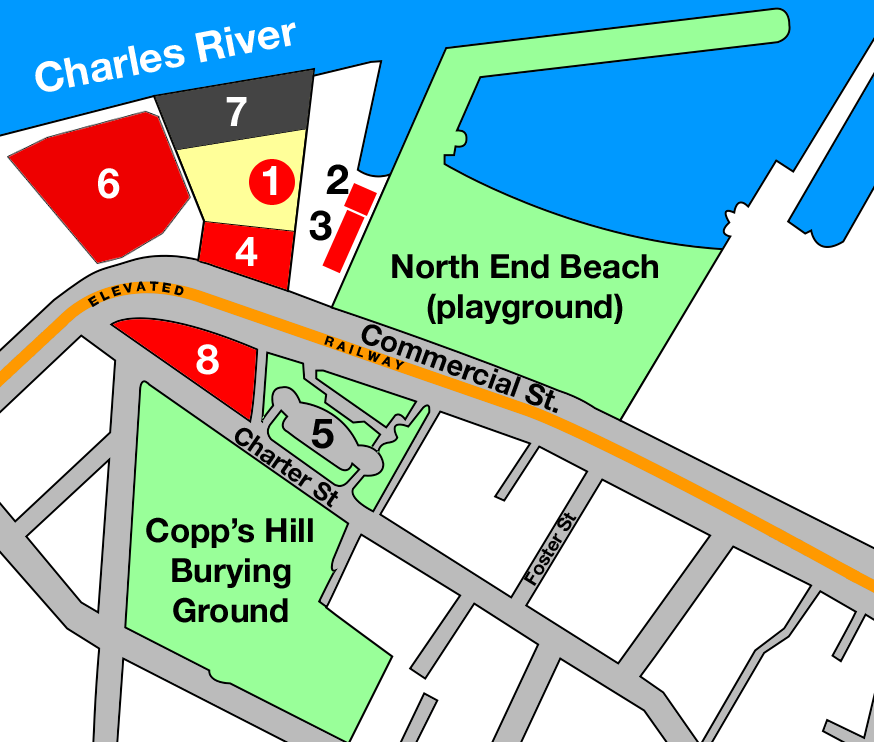
Detail of molasses flood area: 1. Purity Distilling molasses tank; 2. Firehouse 31 (heavy damage); 3. Paving department and police station; 4. Purity offices (flattened); 5. Copp's Hill Terrace; 6. Boston Gas Light building (damaged); 7. Purity warehouse (mostly intact); 8. Residential area (site of flattened Clougherty house)

Name	Age	Occupation
Patrick Breen	44	Laborer (North End Paving Yard)
William Brogan	61	Teamster
John Callahan	43	Paver (North End Paving Yard)
Bridget Clougherty	65	Homemaker
Stephen Clougherty	34	Unemployed
Maria Di Stasio	10	Child
William Duffy	58	Laborer (North End Paving Yard)
Peter Francis	64	Blacksmith (North End Paving Yard)
Flaminio Gallerani	37	Driver
Pasquale Iantosca	10	Child
James J. Kenneally	48	Laborer (North End Paving Yard)
Eric Laird	17	Teamster
George Layhe	38	Firefighter (Engine 31)
James Lennon	64	Teamster/Motorman
Ralph Martin	21	Driver
James McMullen	46	Foreman, Bay State Express
Cesar Nicolo	32	Expressman
Thomas Noonan	43	Longshoreman
John M. Seiberlich	69	Blacksmith (North End Paving Yard)
Peter Shaughnessy	18	Teamster
Michael Sinnott	78	Messenger

== Causes ==
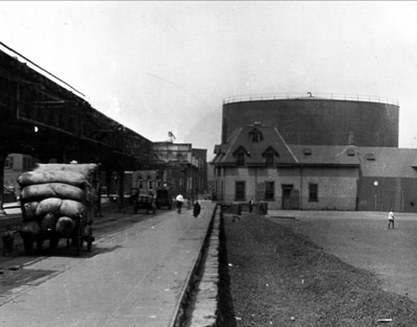
The molasses tank prior to its 1919 rupture—exact date unknown

Several factors might have contributed to the disaster. The first factor is that the tank may have leaked from the very first day that it was filled in 1915. The tank was also poorly constructed and insufficiently tested, and carbon dioxide production may have raised the internal pressure due to fermentation in the tank. Warmer weather the previous day would have assisted in building this pressure, as the air temperature rose from 2 to 41 °F (−17 to 5.0 °C) over that period. The failure occurred from a manhole cover near the base of the tank, and a fatigue crack there possibly grew to the point of criticality.

The tank had been filled to capacity only eight times since it was built a few years previously, putting the walls under an intermittent, cyclical load. Several authors say that the Purity Distilling Company was trying to out-race Prohibition, as the Eighteenth Amendment was ratified the next day (January 16, 1919) and took effect one year later. An inquiry after the disaster revealed that Arthur Jell, USIA's treasurer, neglected basic safety tests while overseeing construction of the tank, such as filling it with water insufficient to check for leaks, and ignored warning signs such as groaning noises each time the tank was filled. He had no architectural or engineering experience. When filled with molasses, the tank leaked so badly that it was painted brown to hide the leakage. Local residents collected leaked molasses for their homes. A 2014 investigation applied modern engineering analysis and found that the steel was half as thick as it should have been for a tank of its size even with the lower standards of the time. Another issue was that the steel lacked manganese, and was more brittle as a result. The tank's rivets were also apparently flawed, and cracks first formed at the rivet holes.

In 2016, a team of scientists and students at Harvard University conducted extensive studies of the disaster, gathering data from many sources, including 1919 newspaper articles, old maps, and weather reports. The student researchers also studied the behavior of cold corn syrup flooding a scale model of the affected neighborhood. The researchers concluded that the reports of the high speed of the flood were credible. Two days before the disaster, warmer molasses had been added to the tank, reducing the viscosity of the fluid. When the tank collapsed, the fluid cooled quickly as it spread, until it reached Boston's winter evening temperatures and the viscosity increased dramatically. The Harvard study concluded that the molasses cooled and thickened quickly as it rushed through the streets, hampering efforts to free victims before they suffocated.

== Area today ==
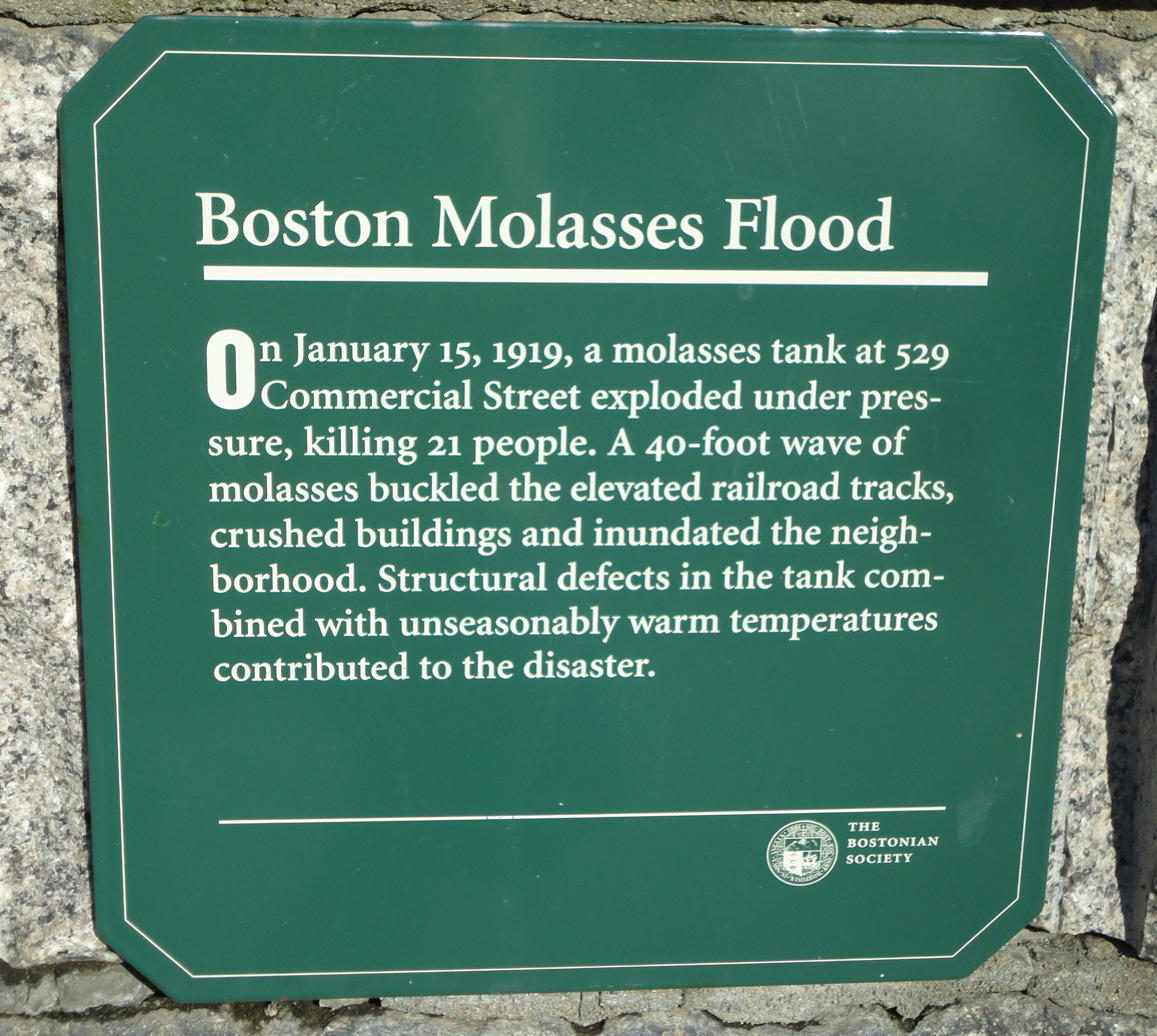
Molasses Flood historical marker

USIA did not rebuild the tank. The property formerly occupied by the molasses tank and the North End Paving Company became a yard for the Boston Elevated Railway (predecessor to the Massachusetts Bay Transportation Authority). It is now the site of a city-owned recreational complex, officially named Langone Park, featuring a Little League Baseball field, a playground, and bocce courts. Immediately to the east is the larger Puopolo Park, with additional recreational facilities.

A small plaque at the entrance to Puopolo Park, placed by The Bostonian Society, commemorates the disaster. The plaque, titled "Boston Molasses Flood", reads:

On January 15, 1919, a molasses tank at 529 Commercial Street exploded under pressure, killing 21 people. A 40-foot wave of molasses buckled the elevated railroad tracks, crushed buildings and inundated the neighborhood. Structural defects in the tank combined with unseasonably warm temperatures contributed to the disaster.

The accident has since become a staple of local culture, not only for the damage the flood brought, but also for the sweet smell that filled the North End for decades after the disaster. According to journalist Edwards Park, "The smell of molasses remained for decades a distinctive, unmistakable atmosphere of Boston."

On January 15, 2019, for the 100th anniversary of the event, a ceremony was held in remembrance. Ground-penetrating radar was used to identify the exact location of the tank from 1919. The concrete slab base for the tank remains in place approximately 20 inches (51 cm) below the surface of the baseball diamond at Langone Park. Attendees of the ceremony stood in a circle marking the edge of the tank. The 21 names of those who died in, or as a result of, the flood were read aloud.

Many laws and regulations governing construction were changed as a direct result of the disaster, including requirements for oversight by a licensed architect and civil engineer.

== In popular culture ==
- The Darkest of the Hillside Thickets' song "Great Molasses Disaster" is about the flood, and their official music video includes many pictures of the aftermath.
- Canadian metal band Protest the Hero's song "All Hands" from the album Palimpsest is written from the perspective of a victim of the flood. The piano interlude to the song is titled "Harborside", a reference to the harborside tanks in which the molasses was stored. The last lines of the song references the first hand accounts of the aftermath.
- The I Survived children's book series by Lauren Tarshis includes I Survived The Great Molasses Flood, 1919, a story written from the perspective of a 12 year-old girl in Boston. A graphic novel version has also been published.
- Bostonian comedian and actress Ayo Edebiri, on Late Night with Seth Meyers, passionately spoke about the Great Molasses Flood where she mentions that she was "reduced to tears" talking about the tragedy, where people outside of Boston are far less aware of the event.
- In 2025, a designer card game about the event was announced—"Molassacre: Escape the Flood" was based on the mid-20th century game Mille Bornes.

== See also ==
- List of disasters in Massachusetts by death toll
- List of non-water floods
- Honolulu molasses spill
