= Charles Adams (seismologist) =

University lecturer, surveyor, astronomer, seismologist

Charles Edward Adams (1 October 1870 – 31 October 1945) was a New Zealand university lecturer,

surveyor, astronomer and seismologist. His father, Charles William Adams, emigrated from Tasmania in 1862 and was also a surveyor and astronomer. Charles was born on 1 October 1870 in Lawrence, New Zealand, educated at the University of Canterbury (then Canterbury College) and then lectured at Lincoln University and Victoria University of Wellington before becoming government astronomer.
