= Joseph A. Langone Jr. =

American politician

Member of the Massachusetts Senate from the 2nd Suffolk district
- In office 1933–1940
- Preceded by: John P. Buckley
- Succeeded by: Robert L. Lee

Boston Election Commissioner
- In office 1946–1947

Personal details
- Born: September 8, 1896 Boston, U.S.
- Died: June 9, 1960 (aged 63) Boston, U.S.
- Cause of death: Heart attack
- Party: Democratic
- Spouse: Clementina Poto Langone
- Children: Louise, Joseph, Madeline, Frederick, William, Rita
- Education: The English High School
- Occupation: Undertaker

Joseph A. Langone Jr. (1896–1960) was a Massachusetts state senator from 1933 to 1940, and was Boston Election Commissioner in the 1940s.

== Early life ==
Langone was born in Boston on September 8, 1896. He attended St. Mary's Parochial School, Warren Grammar School, and English High School.

His father, Joseph A. (Giuseppe Antonio) Langone Sr., was an Italian immigrant from Marsico Nuovo, Potenza, who opened a successful funeral home in Boston and is credited with bringing the Order of the Sons of Italy in America to Massachusetts. In 1907, Langone Sr. was awarded a bronze medal by the Italian government for "notable progress in business and finance and society". From 1923 to 1924, he represented the Fifth Suffolk District in the Massachusetts House of Representatives.

As a first lieutenant in the Massachusetts State Guard, Langone Jr. led a company during the Boston Police Strike of 1919. He followed in his father's footsteps and became an undertaker, eventually running the family funeral home in the North End. In 1927, the Langone funeral home handled the funeral of Sacco and Vanzetti, a historic event that drew thousands of mourners. According to the Boston Globe, it was "one of the most tremendous funerals of modern times."

== Political career ==
Langone and his wife were influential in Depression-era Boston politics. Langone was elected to the Massachusetts State Senate in 1932, narrowly defeating six Irish-American candidates, and ending years of Irish political domination in his district, which included East Boston, Charlestown, and the North, West, and South Ends. He went on to serve four consecutive terms, and was Boston Election Commissioner in several James Michael Curley administrations. Langone's wife "Tina" was also well known in the community. As a member of the Massachusetts Board of Immigration and Americanization, she helped countless local Italian immigrants assimilate and obtain U.S. citizenship.

Known as a fiery-tempered defender of the "little man", Langone launched an investigation into Boston's welfare department, alleging it was withholding money from the needy, and in 1939 organized a march on City Hall to demand better services for the North End. In his obituary he is described as a "strong lieutenant" of Curley, and a man who "did not mince words". He once filed a bill intended to oust Boston Mayor Frederick Mansfield from office.

In 1937, Langone ran for the United States House of Representatives seat in Massachusetts's 11th congressional district. Langone was seen as the favorite due to the district's large Italian population, however he finished third behind Thomas A. Flaherty and John F. Cotter. Flaherty's victory was seen as a swing towards Mayor Maurice J. Tobin and away from James Michael Curley, whose supporters backed Langone.

== Personal life ==
In 1920 he married Clementina Poto Langone. The couple had six children. One, Joseph A. Langone III, became a Massachusetts state representative. Another, Frederick C. Langone, was a Boston city councilor.

He died of a heart attack in Beth Israel Hospital on June 9, 1960.

== Awards and honors ==
In 1940, over 5,000 people attended a testimonial banquet at Boston Garden in honor of Langone and his wife. In attendance were Boston mayor Maurice J. Tobin, Congressman John F. Fitzgerald, Attorney General Paul A. Dever, former Massachusetts governors James Michael Curley and Charles F. Hurley, Springfield mayor Roger Lowell Putnam, Medford mayor John C. Carr, and other Democratic leaders. Mayor Tobin said it was the largest testimonial dinner ever held in Boston.

The Boston Government Service Center in Government Center was named the "Senator Joseph A. Langone Jr. Memorial Center" in his honor.

Langone Park in the North End is named for Langone and his wife.

== See also ==
- Massachusetts legislature: 1933–1934, 1935–1936, 1937–1938, 1939
