= Charles Christopher Adams =

American zoologist

- Born: July 23, 1873; Clinton, Illinois
- Died: May 22, 1955 (aged 81); Albany, New York
- Education: Illinois Wesleyan University (BS, 1895) Harvard University (Masters, 1899); University of Chicago (Ph.D., 1908) Illinois Wesleyan (Sc.D., 1920)
- Scientific career
- Fields: Zoology
- Workplaces: Cincinnati Society of Natural History; University of Cincinnati; New York State College of Forestry; Roosevelt Wild Life Forest Experiment Station

Charles Christopher Adams (July 23, 1873 – May 22, 1955) was an American zoologist, born at Clinton, Illinois, and educated at Illinois Wesleyan University, Harvard, and the University of Chicago.

Adams' parents were William Henry Harrison Adams and Hannah Westfall (Conklin) Adams. He married Alice Luthera Norton in October 1908 and together they had one daughter, Harriet Dyer Adams. His wife died September 1, 1931.

He died in Albany, New York and was buried in Burlington, Wisconsin.

== Career ==
Dr. Adams worked in the fields of general animal ecology and the ecology of prairies, forests and lakes. He began his career as an assistant entomologist at Illinois State Laboratory of Natural History, where he worked from 1896 to 1898. From 1903 to 1906, he served as the curator of the University of Michigan Museum. He was then employed at the Cincinnati Society of Natural History and the Museum of the University of Cincinnati (1906–1907).

In 1908, Adams moved to the academic arena with an appointment as an associate professor at the University of Illinois. He became an assistant professor of forest zoology at the History of the New York State College of Forestry at Syracuse University in 1914 and was subsequently appointed to a full professorship in 1916.

In 1919, Adams became the first director of the Roosevelt Wild Life Forest Experiment Station in the Adirondacks, managed by the New York State College of Forestry. During his time there, he was an instrumental force in the development of the Allegheny State Park in Western New York.

In 1926, Adams left the Roosevelt Station to become the director of the New York State Museum, a position he held until his retirement in 1943.

== Publications ==
Besides numerous papers on animal ecology, he published:

- An Ecological Survey of Isle Royal, Lake Superior, in collaboration (1909)
- Guide to the Study of Animal Ecology (1915)
- An Ecological Study of Forest and Prairie Invertebrates (1915)
- Variations and Ecological Distribution of the Snails of the Genus IO (1915)

In addition to these works, he was also involved in the publication of "A Guide to the Winter Birds of the North Carolina Sandhills" (1928), by Milton Philo Skinner.

== Professional affiliations ==
Dr. Adams was a charter member of the American Association of Museums and a founding member of the American Ecological Society.

He was also a member of the American Society of Naturalists, the Association of American Geographers, the History Science Society and Sigma Xi (the Scientific Research Society).

== Sources ==
- Charles C. Adams Papers, 1915-1968 (bulk 1915-1941). This finding aid contains biographical information about Charles C. Adams and a description of the collection of his papers, mainly related to Roosevelt Wildlife Forest Experimental Station and the Allegany State Park, that are held by the New York State Library.
