= James Adams =

James Adams may refer to:

== Academia ==
- James Adams (Jesuit) (1737–1802), English philologist
- James Truslow Adams (1878–1949), American historian
- James Luther Adams (1901–1994), American theologian
- James B. Adams (professor), professor at Arizona State University
- James Noel Adams (1943–2021), fellow of All Souls College, Oxford and historian of the Latin language

== Arts and entertainment ==
- James Barton Adams (1843–1918), cowboy poet
- James Adams (entrepreneur), American author and entrepreneur
- James B. Adams (composer) (c. 1749 – after 1794), English composer, organist, and cellist
- Jim Adams (musician) (born 1967), American heavy metal guitarist
- James Adams (character), character in the CHERUB series by Robert Muchamore

== Government and politics ==
- James Adams (MP) (1752–1816), British member of parliament and Lord of the Admiralty
- James Adams (Scottish politician) (born 1992), member of the Scottish Parliament
- James Adams (Massachusetts politician) (1810–1880), mayor of Charlestown, Massachusetts
- James Hopkins Adams (1812–1861), American governor of South Carolina
- James Uriah Adams (1812–1871), his cousin, American planter and politician South Carolina
- J. M. Adams (1834–1875), American politician in Wisconsin
- James L. Adams (1921–2014), American politician
- James B. Adams (1926–2020), attorney, Texas legislator, and acting director of the Federal Bureau of Investigation
- James Adams (diplomat) (1932–2020), British diplomat
- W. James Adams, deputy chief technologist at NASA
- James Verne Adams (1914–2000), American politician, member of the Texas House of Representatives

== Religion ==
- James Adams (archdeacon of Kildare) (1780–1864), Irish Anglican priest
- James Adams (Mormon) (1783–1843), American lawyer and intimate friend of the Joseph Smith, Jr., founder of the Latter Day Saint movement
- James Adams (chaplain) (1839–1903), Irish recipient of the Victoria Cross
- James Adams (bishop of Barking) (1915–1999), bishop of Barking, 1975–1983
- James M. Adams Jr. (born 1948), Episcopal bishop in America

== Sports ==
- James Adams (cricketer, born 1811) (1811–1851), English cricketer
- James Adams (cricketer, born 1904) (1904–1988), Australian cricketer
- James Adams (cricketer, born 1980) (born 1980), English cricketer
- James Adams (footballer, born 1864) (1864–1943), Scottish footballer
- James Adams (footballer, born 1896) (1896–1973), English footballer who played for Chesterfield
- James Adams (footballer, born 1908) (1908–1983), English footballer who played for West Bromwich Albion
- Jim Adams (baseball) (1868–?), American baseball player
- Jim Adams (lacrosse) (1928–2019), American college lacrosse coach
- Jim Adams (soccer) (born 1969), English soccer player
- Jamie Adams (footballer) (James Stewart Adams, born 1987), Scottish footballer

== Other ==
- James "Grizzly" Adams (1812–1860), American hunter, basis of a television program
- James F. Adams (1844–1922), American Civil War Medal of Honor recipient
- James W. Adams, carpenter, builder and designer in Kentucky
- James H. Adams III (born c. 1969), United States Marine Corps general

== See also ==
- Adams (surname)
- James Adams Floating Theatre
- James Adam (disambiguation)
- Jimmy Adams (disambiguation)
