= William Boyde (priest) =

Irish Anglican priest

William Boyde (1697–1765) was an Anglican priest in Ireland during the 18th century, most notably Archdeacon of Kildare from 1737 until his death.

Boyde was born in County Antrim and educated at Trinity College, Dublin. He was appointed Chancellor of Kildare Cathedral in 1733.
