= Jamie Adams =

Jamie Adams may refer to:

- Jamie Adams (footballer) (born 1987), Scottish footballer
- Jamie Adams (director) (born 1980), Welsh filmmaker

== See also ==
- James Adams (disambiguation)
