= List of accolades received by The Martian (film) =

The Martian accolades
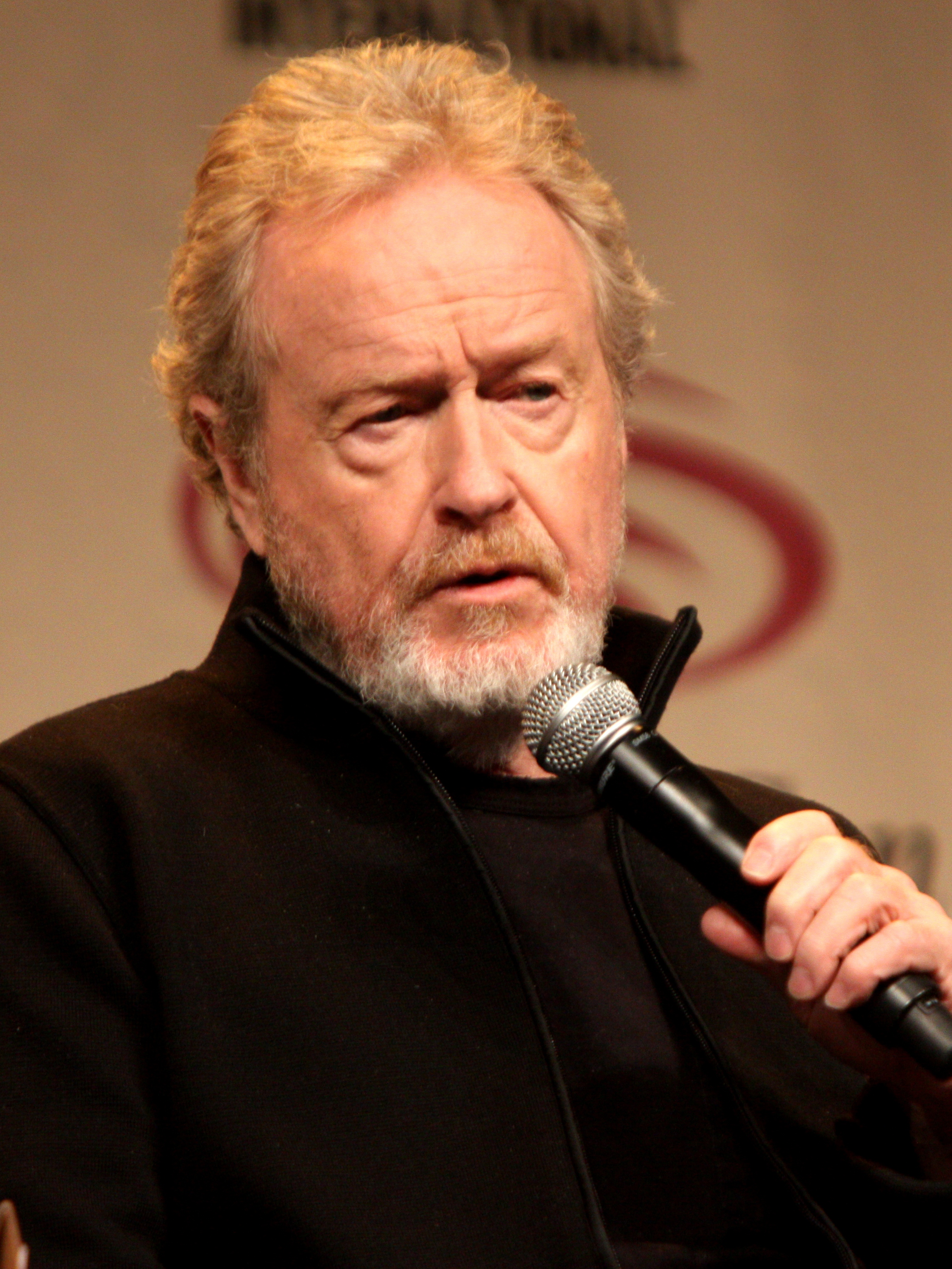
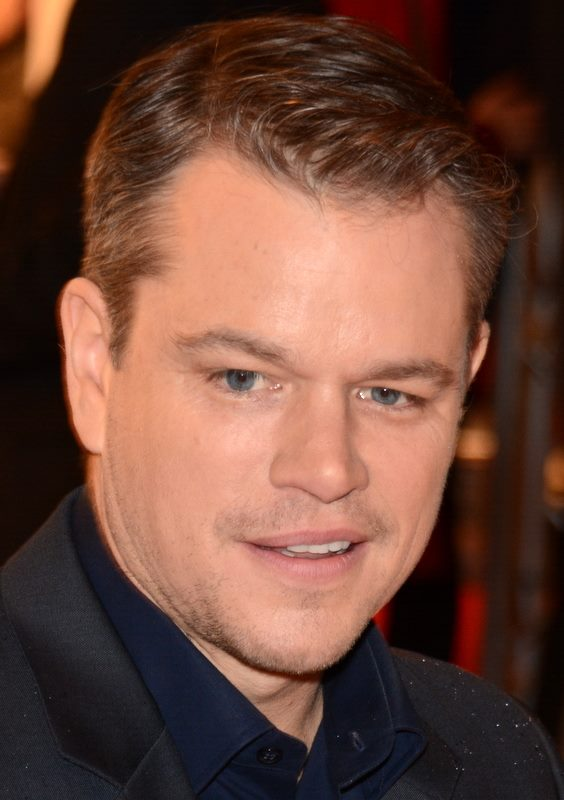
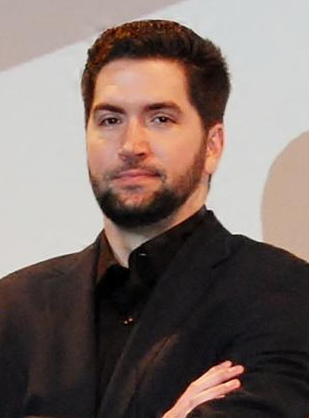
- Director Ridley Scott, actor Matt Damon, and writer Drew Goddard received multiple awards and nominations for their respective work in the film.
Awards and nominations
Award	Wins	Nominations
3D Creative Arts Awards	2	2
AACTA International Awards	0	3
Academy Awards	0	7
African-American Film Critics Association Awards	1	1
Alliance of Women Film Journalists Awards	0	4
American Cinema Editors Awards	0	1
American Film Institute Awards	1	1
Art Directors Guild Awards	1	1
Australian Film Critics Association Awards	0	1
Black Reel Awards	0	1
British Academy Film Awards	0	6
Chicago Film Critics Association Awards	0	1
Costume Designers Guild Awards	0	1
Critics' Choice Movie Awards	0	9
Dallas–Fort Worth Film Critics Association Awards	2	2
Directors Guild of America Awards	0	1
Dorian Awards	0	2
Dragon Awards	1	1
Empire Awards	1	6
Florida Film Critics Circle Awards	0	3
Golden Globe Awards	2	3
Golden Reel Awards	0	2
Golden Trailer Awards	2	5
Guild of Music Supervisors Awards	0	1
Hollywood Film Awards	1	1
Hollywood Music in Media Awards	0	1
Hollywood Post Alliance Awards	0	3
Houston Film Critics Society Awards	0	5
Hugo Awards	1	1
London Film Critics Circle Awards	1	1
MTV Movie Awards	0	1
National Board of Review Awards	4	4
Online Film Critics Society Awards	0	5
Palm Springs International Film Festival	1	1
People's Choice Awards	1	1
Producers Guild of America Awards	0	1
San Diego Film Critics Society Awards	0	7
San Francisco Film Critics Circle Awards	0	1
Santa Barbara International Film Festival	1	1
Satellite Awards	1	8
Saturn Awards	1	6
St. Louis Film Critics Association Awards	0	7
Teen Choice Awards	0	3
USC Scripter Awards	0	1
Visual Effects Society Awards	0	1
Washington D.C. Area Film Critics Association Awards	0	4
Writers Guild of America Awards	0	1

Totals (Note: Certain award groups do not simply award one winner. They acknowledge several different recipients, have runners-up, and have third place. Since this is a specific recognition and is different from losing an award, runner-up mentions are considered wins in this award tally. For simplification and to avoid errors, each award in this list has been presumed to have had a prior nomination.)
- Wins: 25
- Nominations: 132

The Martian is a 2015 science fiction film directed by Ridley Scott and starring Matt Damon. Drew Goddard adapted the screenplay from the 2011 novel The Martian by Andy Weir. The film depicts an astronaut's lone struggle to survive on Mars after being left behind and the efforts of NASA to rescue him and bring him home to Earth. It also stars Jessica Chastain, Kristen Wiig, Jeff Daniels, Michael Peña, Kate Mara, Sean Bean, Sebastian Stan, Aksel Hennie, and Chiwetel Ejiofor.

The Martian debuted at the 2015 Toronto International Film Festival on September 11, 2015, and was released on September 30 in the United Kingdom and on October 2 in the United States. Produced on a budget of $108 million, The Martian grossed $630.6 million worldwide, finishing its theatrical run as Scott's highest-grossing film and the tenth-highest-grossing film of 2015. On the review aggregator website Rotten Tomatoes, the film holds an approval rating of 91% based on 384 reviews.

The Martian garnered awards and nominations in various categories with particular recognition for Scott's direction, Damon's performance, and Goddard's writing, as well as its visual and sound effects, editing, and production design. It garnered seven nominations at the 88th Academy Awards, including Best Picture and Best Actor for Damon. At the 69th British Academy Film Awards, the film was nominated for Best Direction (Scott), Best Actor in a Leading Role (Damon), Best Editing, Best Special Visual Effects, Best Production Design, and Best Sound. It received nine nominations at the 21st Critics' Choice Awards. The film won Best Motion Picture – Musical or Comedy and Best Actor – Motion Picture Musical or Comedy (Damon), and received a nomination for Best Director (Scott) at the 73rd Golden Globe Awards. In addition to four National Board of Review Awards, The Martian was named one of the top-ten films of 2015 by the American Film Institute.

== Accolades ==
Accolades received by The Martian (film)
Award	Date of ceremony	Category	Recipient(s)	Result	Ref.
3D Creative Arts Awards	February 10, 2016	Best Stereoscopic Feature Film – Live Action	The Martian	Won	
3D Creative Arts Awards	February 10, 2016	Best Use of Native 3D	The Martian	Won	
AACTA International Awards	January 29, 2016	Best Actor	Matt Damon	Nominated	
AACTA International Awards	January 29, 2016	Best Direction	Ridley Scott	Nominated	
AACTA International Awards	January 29, 2016	Best Screenplay	Drew Goddard	Nominated	
AARP Movies for Grownups Awards	February 8, 2016	Best Director	Ridley Scott	Won	
Academy Awards	February 28, 2016	Best Picture	Simon Kinberg, Ridley Scott, Michael Schaefer, and Mark Huffam	Nominated	
Academy Awards	February 28, 2016	Best Actor	Matt Damon	Nominated	
Academy Awards	February 28, 2016	Best Adapted Screenplay	Drew Goddard	Nominated	
Academy Awards	February 28, 2016	Best Production Design	Arthur Max and Celia Bobak	Nominated	
Academy Awards	February 28, 2016	Best Sound Editing	Oliver Tarney	Nominated	
Academy Awards	February 28, 2016	Best Sound Mixing	Paul Massey, Mark Taylor, and Mac Ruth	Nominated	
Academy Awards	February 28, 2016	Best Visual Effects	Richard Stammers, Anders Langlands, Chris Lawrence, and Steven Warner	Nominated	
African-American Film Critics Association Awards	February 10, 2016	Top Ten Films	The Martian	Won (Note: This award does not have a single winner, but recognizes multiple films.)	
Alliance of Women Film Journalists Awards	January 12, 2016	Best Film	Ridley Scott	Nominated	
Alliance of Women Film Journalists Awards	January 12, 2016	Best Director	Ridley Scott	Nominated	
Alliance of Women Film Journalists Awards	January 12, 2016	Best Writing – Adapted Screenplay	Drew Goddard	Nominated	
Alliance of Women Film Journalists Awards	January 12, 2016	Best Actor	Matt Damon	Nominated	
American Cinema Editors Awards	January 29, 2016	Best Edited Feature Film – Dramatic	Pietro Scalia	Nominated	
American Film Institute Awards	December 16, 2015	Top 10 Films of the Year	The Martian	Won	
Art Directors Guild Awards	January 31, 2016	Excellence in Production Design for a Contemporary Film	Arthur Max	Won	
Australian Film Critics Association Awards	February 16, 2016	Best International Film (English Language)	The Martian	Nominated	
Black Reel Awards	February 18, 2016	Best Supporting Actor	Chiwetel Ejiofor	Nominated	
British Academy Film Awards	February 14, 2016	Best Direction	Ridley Scott	Nominated	
British Academy Film Awards	February 14, 2016	Best Actor in a Leading Role	Matt Damon	Nominated	
British Academy Film Awards	February 14, 2016	Best Editing	Pietro Scalia	Nominated	
British Academy Film Awards	February 14, 2016	Best Special Visual Effects	Chris Lawrence, Tim Ledbury, Richard Stammers, and Steven Warner	Nominated	
British Academy Film Awards	February 14, 2016	Best Production Design	Arthur Max and Celia Bobak	Nominated	
British Academy Film Awards	February 14, 2016	Best Sound	Paul Massey, Mac Ruth, Oliver Tarney, and Mark Taylor	Nominated	
Chicago Film Critics Association Awards	December 16, 2015	Best Editing	Pietro Scalia	Nominated	
Costume Designers Guild Awards	February 23, 2016	Excellence in Contemporary Film	Janty Yates	Nominated	
Critics' Choice Movie Awards	January 17, 2016	Best Film	The Martian	Nominated	
Critics' Choice Movie Awards	January 17, 2016	Best Actor	Matt Damon	Nominated	
Critics' Choice Movie Awards	January 17, 2016	Best Director	Ridley Scott	Nominated	
Critics' Choice Movie Awards	January 17, 2016	Best Adapted Screenplay	Drew Goddard	Nominated	
Critics' Choice Movie Awards	January 17, 2016	Best Cinematography	Dariusz Wolski	Nominated	
Critics' Choice Movie Awards	January 17, 2016	Best Production Design	Arthur Max and Celia Bobak	Nominated	
Critics' Choice Movie Awards	January 17, 2016	Best Editing	Pietro Scalia	Nominated	
Critics' Choice Movie Awards	January 17, 2016	Best Visual Effects	The Martian	Nominated	
Critics' Choice Movie Awards	January 17, 2016	Best Sci-Fi/Horror Movie	The Martian	Nominated	
Dallas–Fort Worth Film Critics Association Awards	December 14, 2015	Top 10 Films of the Year	The Martian	7th place	
Dallas–Fort Worth Film Critics Association Awards	December 14, 2015	Best Actor	Matt Damon	4th place	
Directors Guild of America Awards	February 6, 2016	Outstanding Directing – Feature Film	Ridley Scott	Nominated	
Dorian Awards	January 19, 2016	Film Performance of the Year – Actor	Matt Damon	Nominated	
Dorian Awards	January 19, 2016	Visually Striking Film of the Year	The Martian	Nominated	
Dragon Awards	September 2–5, 2016	Best Science Fiction or Fantasy Movie	The Martian	Won	
Empire Awards	March 20, 2016	Best Film	The Martian	Nominated	
Empire Awards	March 20, 2016	Best Sci-Fi/Fantasy	The Martian	Nominated	
Empire Awards	March 20, 2016	Best Director	Ridley Scott	Nominated	
Empire Awards	March 20, 2016	Best Actor	Matt Damon	Won	
Empire Awards	March 20, 2016	Best Soundtrack	The Martian	Nominated	
Empire Awards	March 20, 2016	Best Production Design	The Martian	Nominated	
Florida Film Critics Circle Awards	December 23, 2015	Best Film	The Martian	Nominated	
Florida Film Critics Circle Awards	December 23, 2015	Best Director	Ridley Scott	Nominated	
Florida Film Critics Circle Awards	December 23, 2015	Best Visual Effects	The Martian	Nominated	
Golden Globe Awards	January 10, 2016	Best Motion Picture – Musical or Comedy	The Martian	Won	
Golden Globe Awards	January 10, 2016	Best Director	Ridley Scott	Nominated	
Golden Globe Awards	January 10, 2016	Best Actor – Motion Picture Musical or Comedy	Matt Damon	Won	
Golden Reel Awards	February 27, 2016	Outstanding Achievement in Sound Editing – Feature Underscore	Tony Lewis and Richard Whitfield	Nominated	
Golden Reel Awards	February 27, 2016	Outstanding Achievement in Sound Editing – Sound Effects and Foley for Feature Film	Oliver Tarney, Michael Fentum, and Hugo Adams	Nominated	
Golden Trailer Awards	May 4, 2016	Best Drama	"The Martian Trailer" (Giaronomo Productions)	Won	
Golden Trailer Awards	May 4, 2016	Best Drama TV Spot	"Alive" (Wild Card)	Nominated	
Golden Trailer Awards	May 4, 2016	Best Viral Campaign	"Viral – The Right Stuff" (Wild Card)	Nominated	
Golden Trailer Awards	May 4, 2016	Best Drama Poster	"Bring Him Home" (Ignition)	Nominated	
Golden Trailer Awards	May 4, 2016	Best Thriller Poster	"Bring Him Home" One-Sheet (Ignition)	Won	
Guild of Music Supervisors Awards	January 21, 2016	Best Music Supervision in a Film Trailer	Maura Duvall Griffin and Ali Pistoresi (Motive)	Nominated	
Hollywood Film Awards	November 1, 2015	Hollywood Producer Award	Ridley Scott	Won	
Hollywood Music in Media Awards	November 11, 2015	Best Original Score in a Sci-Fi/Fantasy Film	Harry Gregson-Williams	Nominated	
Hollywood Post Alliance Awards	November 17, 2016	Outstanding Color Grading – Feature Film	Stephen Nakamura	Nominated	
Hollywood Post Alliance Awards	November 17, 2016	Outstanding Sound – Feature Film	Pietro Scalia	Nominated	
Hollywood Post Alliance Awards	November 17, 2016	Outstanding Visual Effects – Feature Film	Chris Lawrence, Neil Weatherley, Bronwyn Edwards, and Dale Newton	Nominated	
Houston Film Critics Society Awards	January 9, 2016	Best Picture	The Martian	Nominated	
Houston Film Critics Society Awards	January 9, 2016	Best Director	Ridley Scott	Nominated	
Houston Film Critics Society Awards	January 9, 2016	Best Actor	Matt Damon	Nominated	
Houston Film Critics Society Awards	January 9, 2016	Best Screenplay	Drew Goddard	Nominated	
Houston Film Critics Society Awards	January 9, 2016	Best Cinematography	Dariusz Wolski	Nominated	
Hugo Awards	August 20, 2016	Best Dramatic Presentation, Long Form	Drew Goddard and Ridley Scott	Won	
London Film Critics Circle Awards	January 17, 2016	Film of the Year	The Martian	Nominated	
London Film Critics Circle Awards	January 17, 2016	Director of the Year	Ridley Scott	Nominated	
MTV Movie Awards	April 10, 2016	Best Male Performance	Matt Damon	Nominated	
National Board of Review Awards	December 1, 2015	Top Ten Films	The Martian	Won	
National Board of Review Awards	December 1, 2015	Best Director	Ridley Scott	Won	
National Board of Review Awards	December 1, 2015	Best Actor	Matt Damon	Won	
National Board of Review Awards	December 1, 2015	Best Adapted Screenplay	Drew Goddard	Won	
Online Film Critics Society Awards	December 14, 2015	Best Picture	The Martian	Nominated	
Online Film Critics Society Awards	December 14, 2015	Best Director	Ridley Scott	Nominated	
Online Film Critics Society Awards	December 14, 2015	Best Actor	Matt Damon	Nominated	
Online Film Critics Society Awards	December 14, 2015	Best Adapted Screenplay	Drew Goddard	Nominated	
Online Film Critics Society Awards	December 14, 2015	Best Editing	Pietro Scalia	Nominated	
Palm Springs International Film Festival	January 1–11, 2016	Chairman's Award	Matt Damon	Won	
People's Choice Awards	January 6, 2016	Favorite Dramatic Movie	The Martian	Won	
Producers Guild of America Awards	January 23, 2016	Best Theatrical Motion Picture	Simon Kinberg, Ridley Scott, Michael Schaefer, and Mark Huffam	Nominated	
San Diego Film Critics Society Awards	December 14, 2015	Best Actor	Matt Damon	Nominated	
San Diego Film Critics Society Awards	December 14, 2015	Best Adapted Screenplay	Drew Goddard and Andy Weir	Nominated	
San Diego Film Critics Society Awards	December 14, 2015	Best Editing	Pietro Scalia	Nominated	
San Diego Film Critics Society Awards	December 14, 2015	Best Cinematography	Dariusz Wolski	Nominated	
San Diego Film Critics Society Awards	December 14, 2015	Best Production Design	Arthur Max	Nominated	
San Diego Film Critics Society Awards	December 14, 2015	Best Sound Design	The Martian	Nominated	
San Diego Film Critics Society Awards	December 14, 2015	Best Visual Effects	The Martian	Nominated	
San Francisco Film Critics Circle Awards	December 13, 2015	Best Adapted Screenplay	Drew Goddard	Nominated	
Santa Barbara International Film Festival Awards	February 10, 2016	Variety Artisans Award – Visual Effects	Arthur Max	Won	
Satellite Awards	February 21, 2016	Best Film	The Martian	Nominated	
Satellite Awards	February 21, 2016	Best Director	Ridley Scott	Nominated	
Satellite Awards	February 21, 2016	Best Actor – Motion Picture	Matt Damon	Nominated	
Satellite Awards	February 21, 2016	Best Adapted Screenplay	Drew Goddard	Nominated	
Satellite Awards	February 21, 2016	Best Cinematography	Dariusz Wolski	Nominated	
Satellite Awards	February 21, 2016	Best Film Editing	Pietro Scalia	Nominated	
Satellite Awards	February 21, 2016	Best Sound	The Martian	Won	
Satellite Awards	February 21, 2016	Best Visual Effects	The Martian	Nominated	
Saturn Awards	June 22, 2016	Best Science Fiction Film	The Martian	Nominated	
Saturn Awards	June 22, 2016	Best Director	Ridley Scott	Won	
Saturn Awards	June 22, 2016	Best Writing	Drew Goddard	Nominated	
Saturn Awards	June 22, 2016	Best Actor	Matt Damon	Nominated	
Saturn Awards	June 22, 2016	Best Actress	Jessica Chastain	Nominated	
Saturn Awards	June 22, 2016	Best Special Effects	Anders Langlands, Chris Lawrence, Richard Stammers, and Steven Warner	Nominated	
St. Louis Film Critics Association Awards	December 20, 2015	Best Film	The Martian	Nominated	
St. Louis Film Critics Association Awards	December 20, 2015	Best Director	Ridley Scott	Nominated	
St. Louis Film Critics Association Awards	December 20, 2015	Best Actor	Matt Damon	Nominated	
St. Louis Film Critics Association Awards	December 20, 2015	Best Adapted Screenplay	Drew Goddard	Nominated	
St. Louis Film Critics Association Awards	December 20, 2015	Best Editing	Pietro Scalia	Nominated	
St. Louis Film Critics Association Awards	December 20, 2015	Best Visual Effects	The Martian	Nominated	
St. Louis Film Critics Association Awards	December 20, 2015	Best Soundtrack	The Martian	Nominated	
Teen Choice Awards	July 31, 2016	Choice Movie: Drama	The Martian	Nominated	
Teen Choice Awards	July 31, 2016	Choice Movie Actor: Drama	Matt Damon	Nominated	
Teen Choice Awards	July 31, 2016	Choice Movie Actress: Drama	Jessica Chastain	Nominated	
USC Scripter Awards	February 20, 2016	Best Film	Andy Weir and Drew Goddard	Nominated	
Visual Effects Society Awards	February 2, 2016	Outstanding Visual Effects in a Photoreal Feature	Richard Stammers, Barrie Hemsley, Matt Sloan, Chris Lawrence, and Steven Warner	Nominated	
Washington D.C. Area Film Critics Association Awards	December 7, 2015	Best Director	Ridley Scott	Nominated	
Washington D.C. Area Film Critics Association Awards	December 7, 2015	Best Actor	Matt Damon	Nominated	
Washington D.C. Area Film Critics Association Awards	December 7, 2015	Best Adapted Screenplay	Drew Goddard	Nominated	
Washington D.C. Area Film Critics Association Awards	December 7, 2015	Best Editing	Pietro Scalia	Nominated	
Writers Guild of America Awards	February 13, 2016	Best Adapted Screenplay	Drew Goddard	Nominated	
