= Steven Warner =

- Occupation: Visual effects supervisor
- Years active: 1997–present

Steven Warner is a visual effects supervisor. He is best known for his work on blockbuster feature film projects such as Saving Private Ryan (1998), Gladiator (2000), Defiance (2008), and The Martian (2015).

In 2016, Steven Warner was nominated at the 88th Academy Awards for his work on the film The Martian in the category for Best Visual Effects. His nomination was shared with Anders Langlands, Chris Lawrence, and Richard Stammers.

== Awards and nominations ==
- 2016: Academy Award for Best Visual Effects for The Martian
- 2016: BAFTA Award for Best Special Visual Effects for The Martian
- 2016: SFC Award for Best Visual Effects for The Martian
- 2009: VES Award for Outstanding Special Effects in a Feature Motion for Defiance
