= W. James Adams =

American engineer

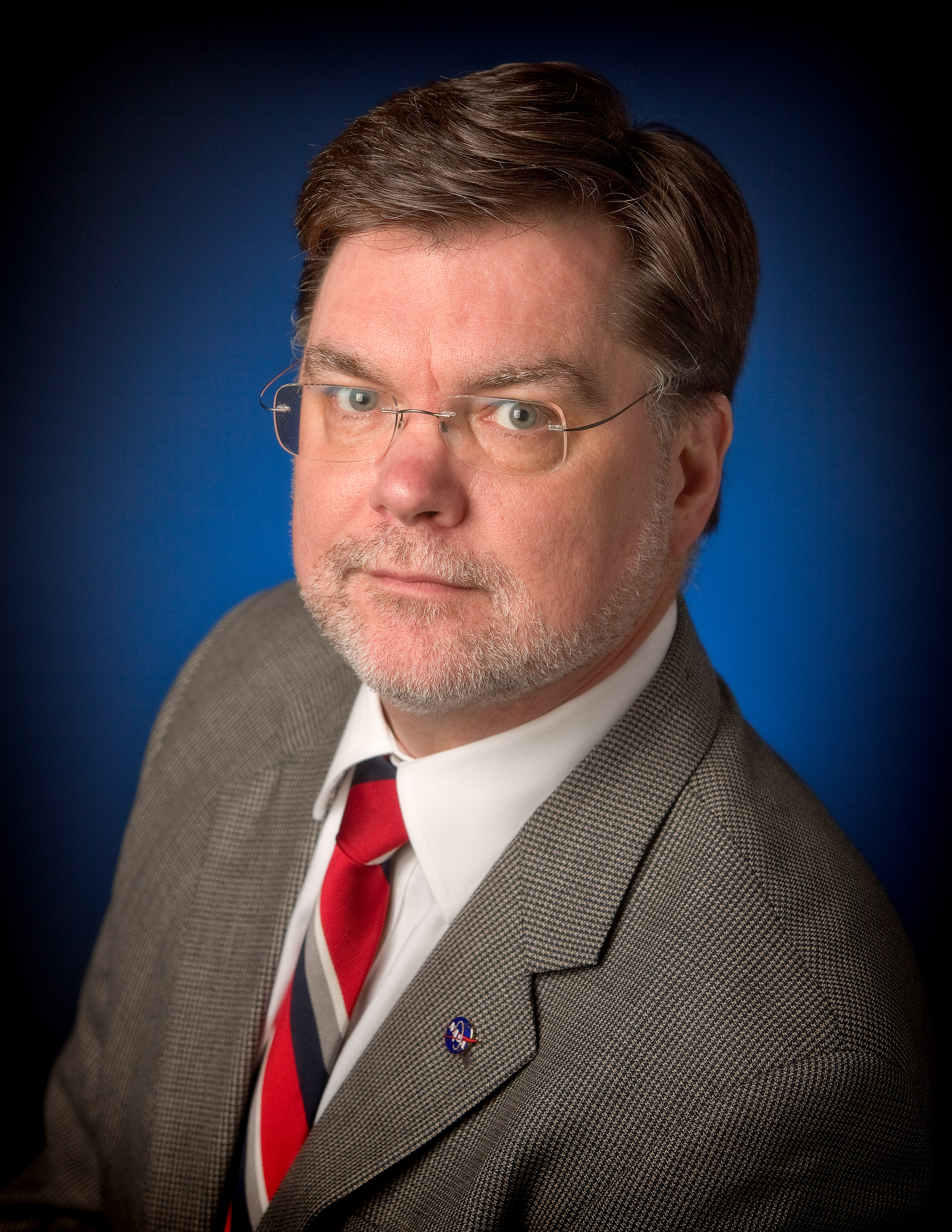
- Born: Fresno, California
- Education: Westminster College; Villanova University
- Scientific career
- Fields: Physics; Electrical Engineering; Management

W. James (Jim) Adams served as the Deputy Chief Technologist at NASA in the Office of the Chief Technologist (OCT) from 2012 until retiring from NASA in 2016. NASA's OCT is responsible for direct management of NASA's space technology programs and for coordination and tracking of all technology investments across the agency.

== Education ==
Adams earned his B.S. degree in physics from Westminster College in New Wilmington, Pennsylvania in 1979. He completed the General Electric Systems Engineering Development Program in 1987 and earned his M.S. degree in electrical engineering from Villanova University in Villanova, Pennsylvania in 1989. In addition to his academic achievements, Adams holds a private pilot's license.

== Career ==
Prior to serving as NASA's Deputy Chief Technologist, Adams was the Deputy Director of the Planetary Science Division in NASA's Science Mission Directorate, he was responsible for the budget, scheduling, and performance of NASA's planetary missions. The Planetary Science Division, directed by James L. Green, is responsible for NASA Solar System exploration efforts including the Lunar Reconnaissance Orbiter, Mars Exploration Rover, and New Horizons missions.

Adams has experience in both industry and government. In 1979, he joined General Electric as an engineer working on a variety of military and civilian space systems. In 1989, he went to work for NASA at the Goddard Space Flight Center as a Space Station Freedom Systems Integration Manager. Most recently he served as the Project Manager for the Tracking and Data Relay Satellite (TDRS). During his career, Adams has worked on the design, development, testing and operations of over 24 launched spacecraft, across three scientific disciplines and human spaceflight.

== Awards and honors ==
Adams has received a number of awards and honors during his career, including the NASA Outstanding Leadership Medal, NASA Exceptional Achievement Medal, NASA Exceptional Service Medal, and the “Business Solutions in the Public Interest” award from the Council for Excellence in Government.
