= Cornelius M'Gelany =

Irish Archdeacon

Cornelius M'Gelany was an Irish priest in the late twelfth and early thirteenth centuries: the first recorded Archdeacon of Kildare (1190–1206).
