= The Martian (Weir novel) =

2011 novel by Andy Weir

The Martian: A Novel
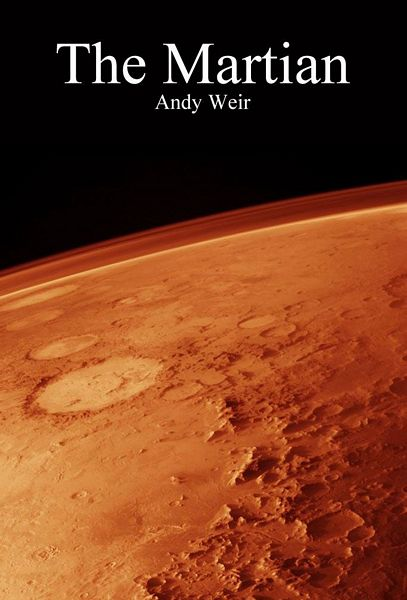
- Original ebook cover
- Author: Andy Weir
- Audio read by: R. C. Bray, Wil Wheaton
- Cover artist: Eric White
- Language: English
- Genre: Science fiction
- Published: September 2011 (self-published); February 2014 (Crown)
- Publication place: United States
- Media type: Print, e-book, audio
- Pages: 369
- ISBN: 978-0-8041-3902-1
- OCLC: 890014492
- Dewey Decimal: 813/.6
- LC Class: PS3623.E446 M37 2014

The Martian is a 2011 science fiction debut novel written by Andy Weir. The book was originally self-published on Weir's blog as a serial. In 2014, the book was re-released after Crown Publishing Group purchased the exclusive publishing rights. The story follows an American astronaut, Mark Watney, as he becomes stranded alone on Mars in 2035 and must improvise in order to survive.

A film adaptation, The Martian, directed by Ridley Scott and starring Matt Damon, was released in October 2015.

== Plot summary ==
In the year 2035, the crew of NASA's Ares 3 mission have arrived at Acidalia Planitia for a month-long stay on Mars. After only six sols, a wind storm threatens to topple their Mars Ascent Vehicle (MAV), which would trap them on the planet. During the evacuation, an antenna tears loose and impales astronaut Mark Watney, a botanist and engineer, also disabling his spacesuit radio and life signs monitoring system. He is flung out of sight by the wind and presumed dead. As the MAV teeters dangerously, mission commander Melissa Lewis has no choice but to take off without completing the search for Watney.

Watney is not dead. His injury proves relatively minor, but with no long-range radio, he cannot communicate with anyone. He must rely on his own resourcefulness to survive and begins a log of his experiences. His philosophy is to "work the problem", solving each challenge in turn as it confronts him. With food a critical, though not immediate, problem, he begins growing potatoes in the crew's Martian habitat, the Hab. He uses an iridium catalyst to separate hydrogen gas from surplus hydrazine fuel, which he then burns with the oxygen in the Habs' air to generate water for the plants.

NASA eventually discovers that Watney is alive when satellite images of the landing site show evidence of his activities; NASA personnel begin devising ways to rescue him, but withhold the news of his survival from the rest of the Ares 3 crew, who are on their way back to Earth aboard the Hermes spacecraft, so as not to distract them.

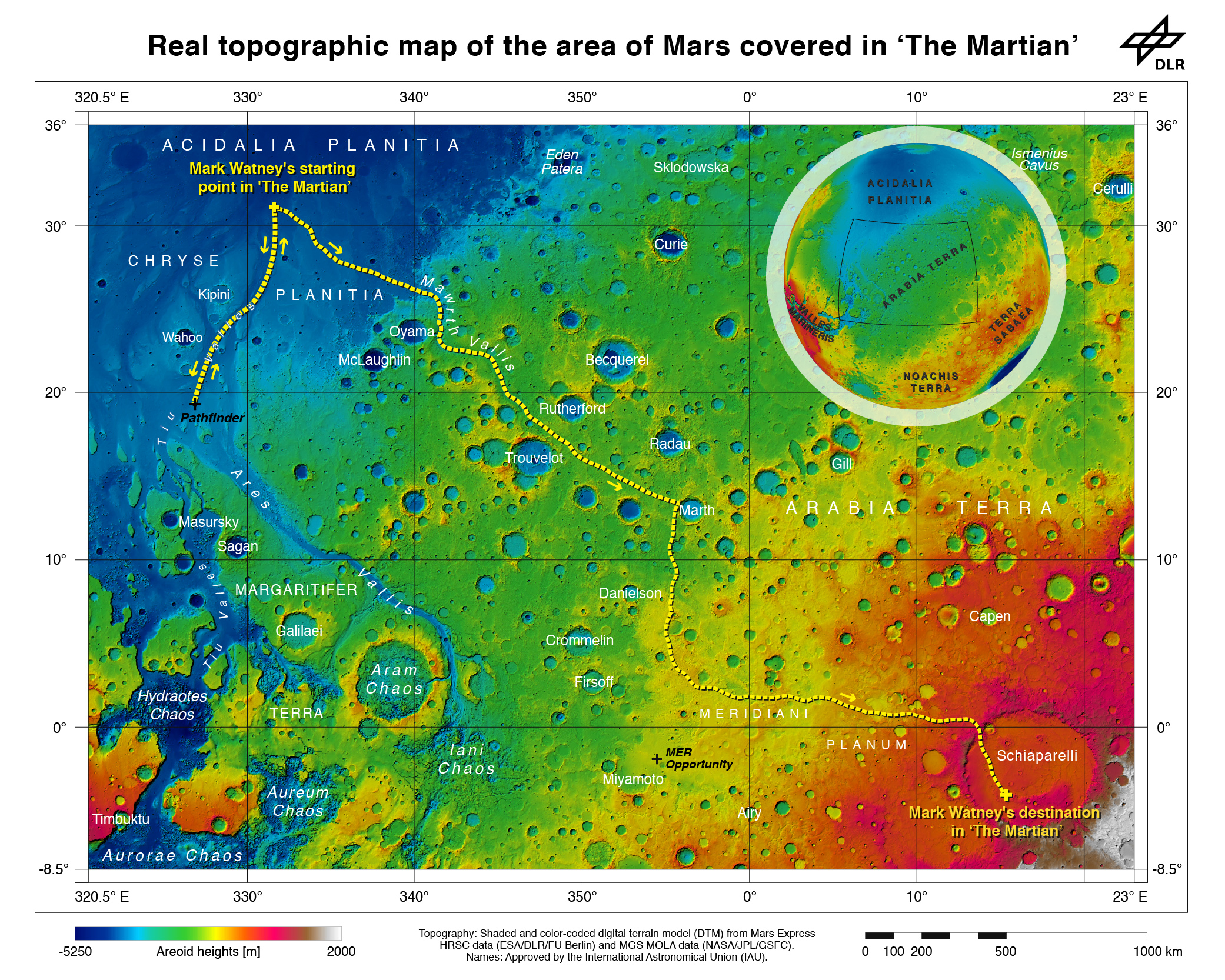
Mark Watney's route on the surface of Mars

Watney plans to drive 3,235 kilometres (2,010 mi) to Schiaparelli crater where the next mission, Ares 4, will land in four years and whose MAV is already pre-positioned. He begins modifying one of the rovers for the journey, adding solar cells and an additional battery. He makes a three-week test drive to recover part of the Pathfinder lander and Sojourner rover and brings it back to the Hab, enabling him to contact NASA. Mitch Henderson, the Ares 3 flight director, convinces NASA Administrator Teddy Sanders to allow him to inform the Ares 3 crew of Watney's survival; they are thrilled, except for Lewis, who is guilt‑stricken at leaving him behind.

The canvas at one of the Hab airlocks tears because of Watney's repeated use of the same airlock, which was not designed for frequent and long‑term usage. This results in the depressurization of the Hab and nearly kills him. He repairs the Hab, but his plants are dead, threatening him again with eventual starvation. Setting aside safety protocols to comply with time constraints, NASA hastily prepares an uncrewed probe to send Watney supplies, but the rocket disintegrates after liftoff. A deal with the China National Space Administration provides a ready booster — planned for use with the Taiyang Shen, an uncrewed solar probe — to try again. With no time to build a probe with a soft-landing system, NASA is faced with the prospect of building a capsule whose cargo can survive crashing into the Martian surface at 300 meters per second (670 mph).

However, astrodynamicist Rich Purnell devises a "slingshot" trajectory around Earth for a gravity assist that could get Hermes back to Mars on a much-extended mission to save Watney, using the Chinese rocket booster to send a simpler resupply probe to Hermes as it passes Earth. Sanders vetoes the "Rich Purnell Maneuver", as it would entail risking the other crewmembers, but Henderson secretly emails the details to Hermes. All five of Watney's crewmates approve the plan. Once they begin the maneuver, having disabled the remote overrides, NASA has no choice but to support them. The resupply ship docks with Hermes successfully.

Watney resumes modifying the rover because the new rescue plan requires him to lift off from Mars in the Ares 4 MAV. While working on the rover, Watney accidentally shorts out the electronics of Pathfinder, losing the ability to communicate with Earth, except for spelling out Morse code with rocks for a one-way communication.

After Watney leaves for Schiaparelli, NASA discovers that a dust storm is approaching his path, but has no way to warn him. The resulting reduction in sunlight decreases the rover's ability to recharge, endangering both the rendezvous and his immediate survival if there is not enough power to run his life-support equipment. While crossing Arabia Terra, Watney becomes aware of the darkening sky and improvises a rough measurement of the storm's shape and direction of movement, enabling him to go around it.

Surviving a rover rollover on his descent into Schiaparelli, Watney reaches the MAV and reestablishes contact with NASA. He receives instructions on the radical modifications necessary to reduce the MAV's weight to enable it to intercept Hermes during its flyby. The modifications include removing the nose cap of the MAV, which Watney has to cover with Hab canvas. After takeoff, the canvas tears, creating extra drag and leaving the MAV too low for the rendezvous.

Lewis hastily improvises a plan to intercept the MAV by firing Hermes' attitude thrusters and then blowing a hole in the front airlock with an improvised sugar-and-liquid-oxygen bomb, using the thrust from the escaping air to reduce speed. Beck, the Hermes' EVA specialist, uses a Manned Maneuvering Unit on a tether to reach Watney and bring him back to Hermes. In a final log entry, Watney expresses his joy at being rescued, reflecting on the human instinct to help those in need.

== Main characters ==
The major characters in the novel are:

- Mark Watney – The titular "Martian" and main character; Ares 3 astrobotanist and mechanical engineer.
- Melissa Lewis – Commander of Ares 3, United States Navy Submarine Warfare officer, oceanographer, and geologist.
- Rick Martinez – Ares 3 pilot.
- Beth Johanssen – Ares 3 computer specialist.
- Alex Vogel – Ares 3 astrochemist.
- Dr. Chris Beck – Ares 3 flight surgeon and EVA specialist.
- Dr. Venkat Kapoor – Ares program manager.
- Mitch Henderson – Chief of astronaut corps.
- Bruce Ng – Director of JPL.
- Teddy Sanders – NASA administrator (head of NASA).
- Annie Montrose – NASA public relations chief.
- Mindy Park – NASA satellite imaging.
- Rich Purnell – NASA astrodynamicist.

== Publishing history ==
Andy Weir, the son of a particle physicist and electrical engineer, has a background in computer science. He began writing the book in 2009, researching related material so that it would be as realistic as possible and based on existing technology. Weir had previously used the concept of humans stranded on Mars in his webcomic Casey and Andy. (Note: Galactanet – The Creative Writings of Andy Weir, Casey and Andy Strip #125) Weir studied orbital mechanics, astronomy, and the history of human spaceflight. He said he knows the exact date of each day in the book. He specifically avoided physically describing the characters when not necessary for the plot.

Having been rebuffed by literary agents when trying to get prior books published, Weir decided to put the book online in serial format one chapter at a time for free at his website. At the request of fans, he made an Amazon Kindle version available at 99 cents (the minimum allowable price he could set). The Kindle edition rose to the top of Amazon's list of best-selling science-fiction titles, selling 35,000 copies in three months, more than had been previously downloaded free. This garnered the attention of publishers: Podium Publishing, an audiobook publisher, signed for the audiobook rights in January 2013. Weir sold the print rights to Crown in March 2013 for over US$100,000.

The book debuted on the New York Times Best Seller list on March 2, 2014, in the hardcover fiction category at twelfth position and remained on this list for four weeks without going above eleventh position. The trade paperback edition of the novel debuted on The New York Times Best Seller list on November 16, 2014, in the paperback trade fiction category at eighth position. It gradually rose to the top position for the week of June 28, 2015, before dropping down to number two for nine weeks, during which it was displaced by E. L. James' Grey, before returning to the top position on September 6, 2015.

The book remained continuously at the number one position for 12 weeks before it was displaced on November 22, 2015, by Nora Roberts' Stars of Fortune for two weeks. The trade paperback returned to the top position for the third and final time on December 6, 2015, for six weeks before it was finally replaced on January 24, 2016. The trade paperback's final appearance on the list occurred on April 24, 2016, 76 weeks after its debut in this category. Overall, the trade paperback edition was on the top of its New York Times best seller category for a total of 19 out of 76 weeks that the edition was listed.

== Editions ==
The Martian was published in print by Crown on February 11, 2014. There are significant textual changes between Weir's original self-published version and the Crown edition: profanity was reduced, spelling and grammatical errors were fixed, there were many minor stylistic changes, scientific errors were corrected, and a 263-word epilogue removed. An audiobook edition, narrated by R. C. Bray and released by Podium Publishing, preceded the print release in March 2013 on Audible.com, and was later followed with an MP3 CD in association with Brilliance Audio. The audiobook was nominated for and won an Audie Award (2014) in the Science Fiction category. A Classroom Edition, published by Broadway Books in May 2016, contains educational materials and removes profanity and also made further scientific corrections. Audible released a new audiobook edition, narrated by Wil Wheaton in January 2020, featuring several additional short tie-in stories written by Weir.

== Tie-ins ==
In 2015, Andy Weir wrote a prequel short story to The Martian, titled "Diary of an AssCan".

A German publication of an interview with Andy Weir and survival tips for living on Mars was published in 2017, titled "Der Mars Survival Guide", tying into the novel and movie.

In 2024, Weir released the short story The Martian: Lost Sols to celebrate 10 years since the first publication.

== Reception ==
In a starred review, Publishers Weekly said that "Weir laces the technical details with enough keen wit to satisfy hard science fiction fan and general reader alike." Kirkus Reviews called The Martian "Sharp, funny and thrilling, with just the right amount of geekery". The Wall Street Journal called the book "the best pure sci-fi novel in years". Entertainment Weekly gave the novel a grade of "B", describing it as "an impressively geeky debut novel" but saying Weir "stumbles with his secondary characters".

USA Today rated The Martian three out of four stars, calling it "terrific stuff, a crackling good read" but noting that "Mark's unflappability, perhaps the book's biggest asset, is also its greatest weakness. He's a wiseacre with a tendency to steer well clear of existential matters." Amazing Stories commented, "Andy Weir's The Martian will leave you as breathless as if you'd been dropped on the Martian surface without a suit".

== Legacy and cultural impact ==
The Martian has been translated into over 45 languages, with some having won major awards. In 2015, the Japanese translation of the novel won the Seiun Award for Best Translated Long Story, the Hebrew translation won the Geffen Award for Best Translated Science Fiction Novel, and the Spanish translation won the Ignotus Awards for Best Foreign Novel. At the 2016 Hugo Awards, Weir won the John W. Campbell Award for Best New Writer for The Martian, while the screenplay adapted from the novel won Best Dramatic Presentation, Long Form at the same event.

On December 5, 2014, the Orion spacecraft took the cover page of The Martian script on the first test flight of the uncrewed Exploration Flight Test 1 (EFT-1). The script was launched atop a Delta IV Heavy on the flight lasting 4 hours and 24 minutes, landing at its target in the Pacific Ocean. In October 2015, NASA presented a new web tool to follow Watney's trek across Mars, and details of NASA's next steps, as well as a health hazards report, for a real-world human journey to Mars.

Solanum watneyi, a species of bush tomato from Australia, was named after the fictional botanist. It is a member of the same genus as the potato, Solanum.

=== Film adaptation ===
In March 2013, Twentieth Century Fox optioned the film rights and hired screenwriter Drew Goddard to adapt and direct the film. In May 2014, it was reported that Ridley Scott was in negotiations to direct an adaptation that would star Matt Damon as Mark Watney. On September 3, 2014, Jessica Chastain joined the film as Commander Lewis. The ensemble cast also includes Kristen Wiig, Jeff Daniels, Michael Peña, Kate Mara, Sean Bean, Sebastian Stan, and Chiwetel Ejiofor. The film was released on October 2, 2015, and became the 10th-highest-grossing film of the year. The film has also been nominated for several accolades including six Academy Awards for Best Motion Picture and Best Adapted Screenplay.

== See also ==
- Mars in fiction
- Andy Weir – American novelist (born 1972)
- A Fall of Moondust – 1961 science-fiction novel by Arthur C. Clarke
- Project Hail Mary – 2021 science-fiction novel by Andy Weir
- Mars Direct – Proposal for a crewed Mars mission
- The Moon Is Hell! – 1951 collection of two stories by John W. Campbell Jr.
- No Man Friday – 1956 novel by Rex Gordon
- Robinson Crusoe on Mars – 1964 American science fiction film by Byron Haskin
- Robinsonade – Literary genre
