= Jimmy Adams (disambiguation) =

Jimmy Adams may refer to:

- Jimmy Adams (born 1968), former Jamaican cricketer
- James Adams (cricketer, born 1980), Hampshire cricketer
- Jimmy Adams (racing driver) (born 1972), American racecar driver
- Jimmy Adams (golfer) (1910–1986), Scottish professional golfer
- Jimmy Adams (footballer) (1937–2005), English soccer player
- Jimmie Adams (1888–1933), American silent-screen comedian
- Jimmie V. Adams (born 1936), United States Air Force four-star general

== See also ==
- James Adams (disambiguation)
- Adams (surname)
