= James Adam =

James Adam may refer to:

- James Adam (architect) (1732–1794), Scottish architect
- James N. Adam (1842–1912), American politician
- James Adam (classicist) (1860–1907), Scottish classicist
- James Adam (emigration agent) (1822–1908), New Zealand local politician for Otago Provincial Council
- James Adam, Lord Adam (1824–1914), Scottish judge
- Jimmy Adam (1931–2008), Scottish footballer

== See also ==
- James Adams (disambiguation)
