= James L. Green =

American scientist

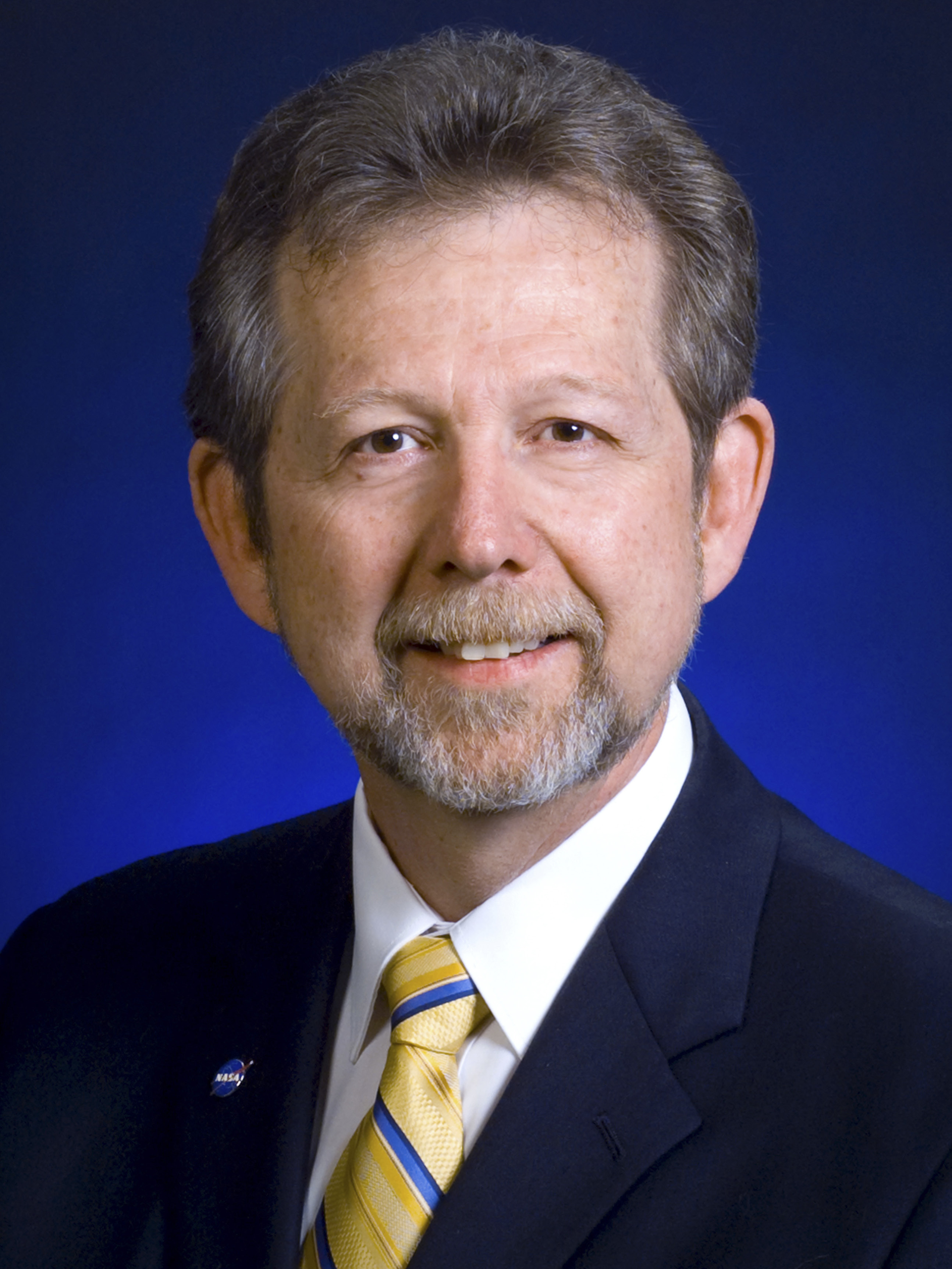
- Born: Burlington, Iowa
- Education: University of Iowa
- Known for: Developed and managed the Space Physics Analysis Network; Director of the National Space Science Data Center; Director, Planetary Science Division, NASA
- Awards: Arthur S. Flemming Award (1988); Japan's Kotani Prize (1996)
- Scientific career
- Fields: Astronomy; Physics
- Workplaces: National Aeronautics and Space Administration - Science Mission Directorate - Planetary Science Division
- Doctoral advisor: Donald Gurnett
- Other academic advisors: James Van Allen

James Lauer Green is an American physicist and retired chief scientist for NASA. He received his Ph.D. in Space Physics from the University of Iowa in 1979 and then worked at NASA until his retirement on 1 January 2022.

== History ==
=== NASA career ===
Green began working in the Magnetospheric Physics Branch at NASA's Marshall Space Flight Center in 1980. At Marshall, Green developed and managed the Space Physics Analysis Network that provided scientists with access to data. From 1985 to 1992 he was the head of the National Space Science Data Center (NSSDC) at Goddard Space Flight Center. The NSSDC is NASA's largest space science data archive. He was the Chief of the Space Science Data Operations Office from 1992 until 2005, when he became the Chief of the Science Proposal Support Office. While at Goddard, Green was a co-investigator and the Deputy Project Scientist on the IMAGE mission.

Green has written over 100 scientific articles in refereed journals involving various aspects of the Earth's and Jupiter's magnetospheres and over 50 technical articles on various aspects of data systems and networks. In August 2006, Green became the Director of the Planetary Science Division at the NASA Headquarters. In that role he served as a spokesman for NASA for planetary missions, for instance announcing the likelihood that there was once flowing water on Mars in September 2015. Under his leadership at the Planetary Science Division, several missions were successfully completed or launched, including the New Horizons probe to Pluto, the MESSENGER probe to Mercury, the launch of Juno probe to Jupiter, the launch of Grail A and B to the Moon, the Dawn probe to Vesta, and the landing of the Mars Science Laboratory and Curiosity rover on Mars.

In a 2015 TED presentation, he covered the places in the Solar System that are most likely to harbor alien life.

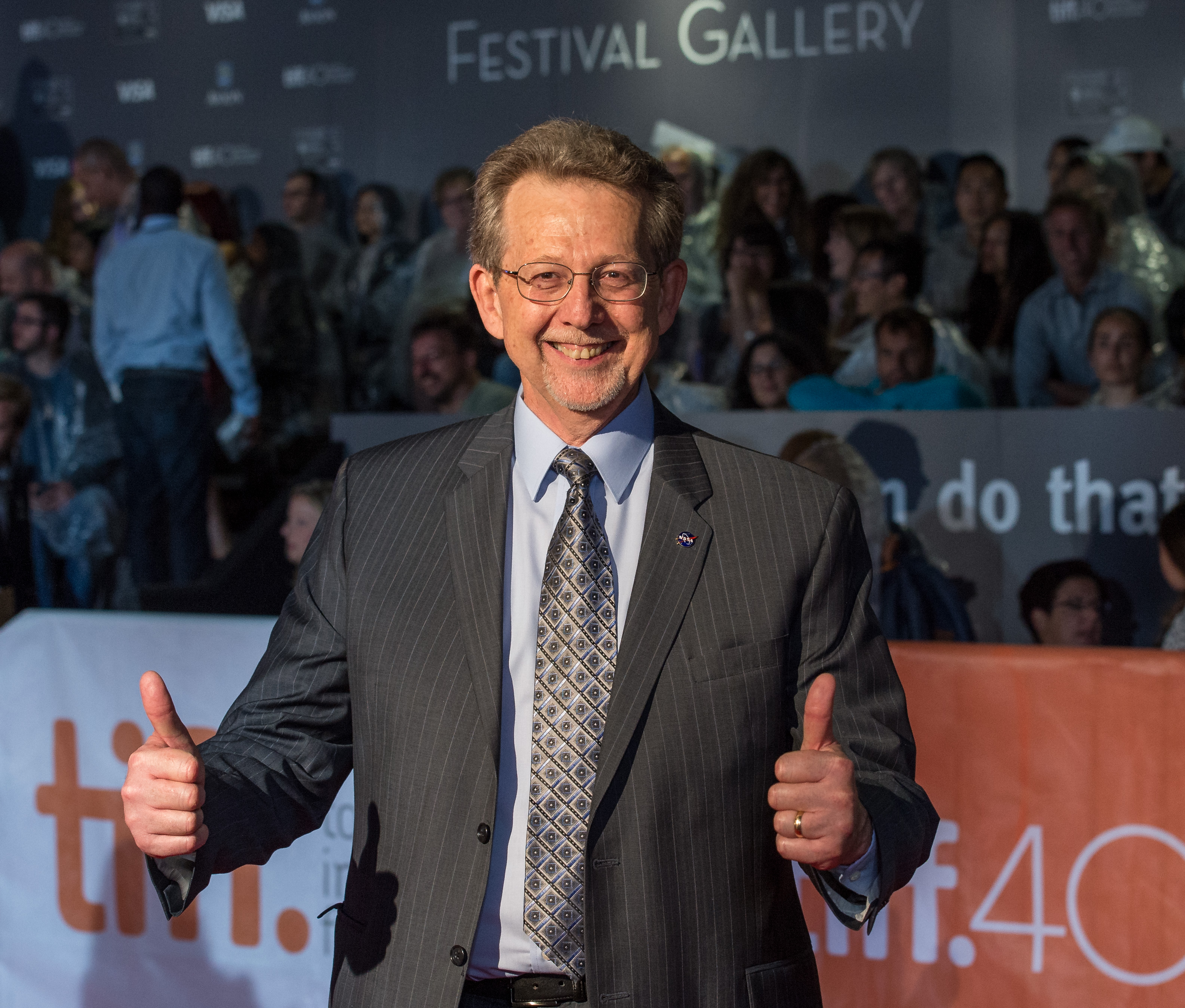
Green at The Martian premier, 2015

In 2015, Green was a part of the NASA's involvement with the film The Martian.

In 2018, acting NASA Administrator Robert Lightfoot named Green as NASA's new chief scientist, effective May 1, 2018. He retired from this position on 1 January 2022, after over 40 years of service at NASA.

=== Awards and recognition ===
In 1988, Green received the Arthur S. Flemming award given for outstanding individual performance in the federal government and was awarded Japan's Kotani Prize in 1996 in recognition of his international science data management activities. In 2016, Green was named an Alumni Fellow of the College of Liberal Arts & Sciences (CLAS) at the University of Iowa.

In 2017, he had an asteroid named after him, 25913 Jamesgreen.

=== Civil War Trust ===
Green, a Civil War Trust member, has written about Civil War ballooning and has spoken at the 150th anniversary of the first tether balloon ascension. He served as an advisor on the Intrepid project, an initiative to construct and fly the world's first replica of a Civil War crewed balloon, and presented a talk for its official first lift-off at the Genesee Country Village & Museum celebration in Mumford, New York on July 4, 2012. On September 7, 2018, he presented The Science of Ballooning During the Civil War to the Philosophical Society of Washington (PSW Science).
