= Archdeacon of Kildare =

The Archdeacon of Kildare was a senior ecclesiastical officer within the Diocese of Kildare until 1846 when it became an office within the Archdiocese of Dublin, Kildare and Glendalough and since 1976, an office in the united Diocese of Meath and Kildare. The Archdeacon can trace its history from Cornelius M'Gelany who held office from 1190 to 1206 through to the last discrete incumbent James Adams who held office in the first quarter of the 20th century.
