= The Martian (film) =

2015 film by Ridley Scott

- Theatrical release poster
- Directed by: Ridley Scott
- Screenplay by: Drew Goddard
- Based on: The Martian by Andy Weir
- Produced by: Simon Kinberg; Ridley Scott; Michael Schaefer; Mark Huffam; Aditya Sood
- Starring: Matt Damon; Jessica Chastain; Kristen Wiig; Jeff Daniels; Michael Peña; Kate Mara; Sean Bean; Sebastian Stan; Aksel Hennie; Chiwetel Ejiofor
- Cinematography: Dariusz Wolski
- Edited by: Pietro Scalia
- Music by: Harry Gregson-Williams
- Production companies: 20th Century Fox; Scott Free Productions; Kinberg Genre; Mid Atlantic Films; International Traders
- Distributed by: 20th Century Fox
- Release dates: September 11, 2015 (TIFF); September 30, 2015 (United Kingdom); October 2, 2015 (United States)
- Running time: 142 minutes
- Countries: United Kingdom; United States; Hungary; Jordan
- Language: English
- Budget: $108 million
- Box office: $653.6 million

The Martian is a 2015 epic science fiction survival film directed by Ridley Scott from a screenplay by Drew Goddard. Based on Andy Weir's 2011 novel, and distributed by 20th Century Fox, the film stars Matt Damon, alongside an ensemble cast featuring Jessica Chastain, Jeff Daniels, Kristen Wiig, Chiwetel Ejiofor, Sean Bean, Michael Peña, Kate Mara, Sebastian Stan, and Mackenzie Davis. The film depicts an astronaut's struggle to survive on Mars after being left behind and NASA's efforts to return him to Earth.

Producer Simon Kinberg began developing the film after Fox optioned the novel in March 2013. Goddard, who adapted the novel into a screenplay, was initially attached to direct, but production was only approved after Scott replaced Goddard as director and Damon was cast as the main character. Filming began in November 2014 and lasted about 70 days, on a $108 million budget. Twenty sets were built on one of the largest sound stages in the world in Budapest, Hungary. Wadi Rum in Jordan was also used for exterior filming.

The Martian premiered at the 2015 Toronto International Film Festival on September 11, 2015, and was released in the United Kingdom on September 30, and in the United States on October 2, in 2D, 3D, RealD 3D, IMAX 3D, and 4DX formats. The film opened to critical acclaim, and grossed $653.6 million worldwide, becoming the tenth-highest-grossing film of 2015, as well as Scott's highest-grossing film to date. Named by the National Board of Review and by the American Film Institute one of the top-ten films of 2015, The Martian received numerous accolades, including seven nominations at the 88th Academy Awards.

== Plot ==
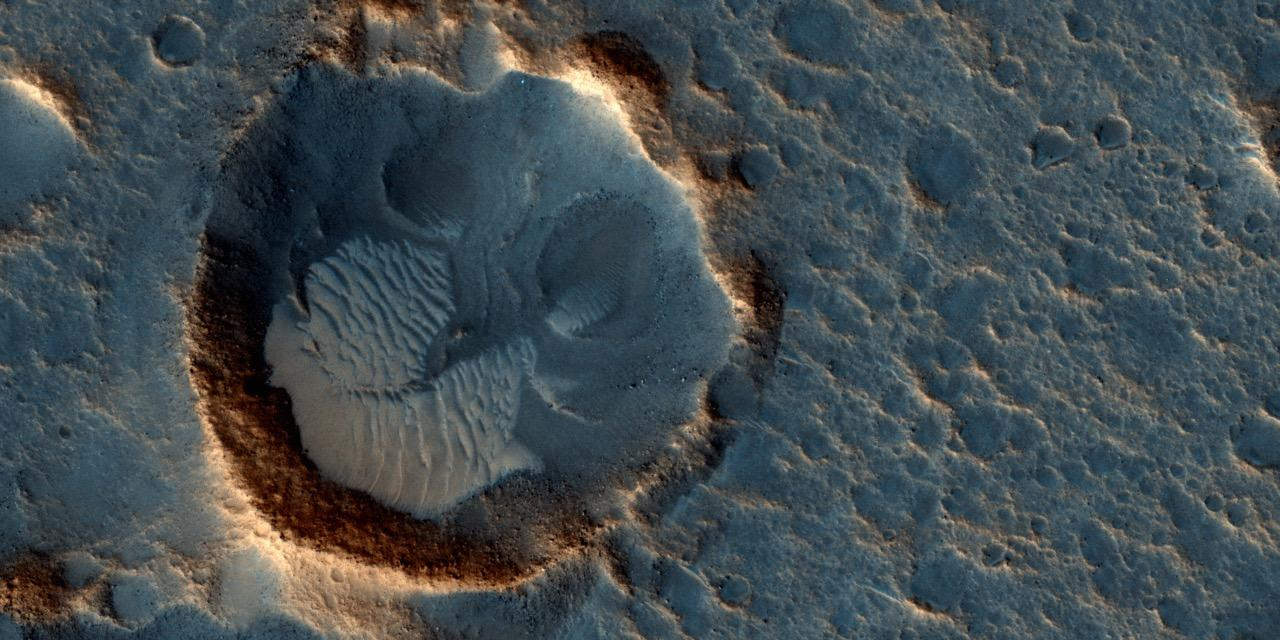
Ares III mission landing site (Acidalia Planitia region)

In 2035, the crew of the Ares III mission to Mars is exploring Acidalia Planitia on Martian solar day (sol) 18 of their 31-sol expedition. A severe dust storm threatens their Mars Ascent Vehicle (MAV) and in the ensuing evacuation, astronaut Mark Watney is struck by flying debris and presumed dead. Facing imminent peril, the remaining crew takes off for their orbiting vessel, the Hermes, which will then return them to Earth. Watney awakens after the storm, having narrowly survived his injuries. As he recovers within the crew's surface habitat ("Hab"), he begins a video diary to document his thoughts on survival. Unable to communicate with Earth, his only chance of rescue is the next Mars mission in four years, when Ares IV will land at the Schiaparelli crater. The Ares IV MAV has already arrived on the site in preparation for the mission. With this timeframe in mind, Watney's main survival concerns are food and travel. Being a botanist, he cultivates a potato garden inside the Hab using the crew's bio-waste with Martian soil, and creates water from leftover rocket fuel. He also modifies a rover for the journey to Schiaparelli.

On Earth, NASA satellite planner Mindy Park notices Watney's activity from recorded satellite images, and suspects he must be alive. NASA director Teddy Sanders releases the news to the public but decides not to inform the Ares III crew en route to Earth, over flight director Mitch Henderson's strong objection. Watney explores the surrounding terrain and studies his maps, but he quickly journeys out to retrieve the Pathfinder probe, hoping to restore its communications. Mars missions director Vincent Kapoor realizes this strategy, and quickly visits Jet Propulsion Laboratory (JPL) director Bruce Ng to use their replica of the probe. The agency makes contact with Watney and instructs him to link Pathfinder to the rover, where he can now communicate by text. With this breakthrough, Henderson is finally allowed to inform Watney's crewmates.

As Watney enters the Hab on one evening, a leak in the airlock causes an explosion that injures him and destroys the potato garden. Although he repairs the airlock, he is again threatened by starvation. NASA scrambles to procure a resupply ship for Watney, with Sanders ordering routine safety inspections bypassed to expedite the mission. This oversight results in catastrophe as the ship disintegrates shortly after launch. The China National Space Administration decides to offer a launch vehicle – originally intended for the Taiyang Shen space probe – to resupply Watney. Astrodynamicist Rich Purnell devises an alternative plan: send the Taiyang Shen launcher to resupply the Hermes, which will then use Earth's gravity to "slingshot" back to Mars two years earlier than Ares IV. Sanders flatly rejects the idea, considering it too risky for the Ares III crew. Henderson surreptitiously sends the proposal to the crew, and they unanimously vote in favor and divert the Hermes. Sanders is forced to support them publicly, but demands Henderson's resignation after the mission.

After waiting several months, Watney embarks on the long journey to the Ares IV MAV. He plans to use it to rendezvous with the Hermes, but needs to lighten the load considerably by partially dismantling the cockpit. He takes off to orbit, but the Hermes crew find that they remain too far away and moving too fast to retrieve him. Commander Lewis quickly improvises to explode the airlock in part of the ship, resulting in air violently escaping and slowing them down. Lewis also pilots a tethered Manned Maneuvering Unit to personally reach Watney, but they are still too far apart. Watney quickly improvises by piercing his pressure suit, and propels himself with the escaping air, reaches Lewis, and manages to hold on. NASA and spectators across the world all celebrate the successful rescue.

After returning to Earth, Watney becomes a survival instructor for astronaut candidates. Five years later, as the Ares V is launching, those involved in Watney's rescue are seen in their current lives watching the launch footage.

== Cast ==
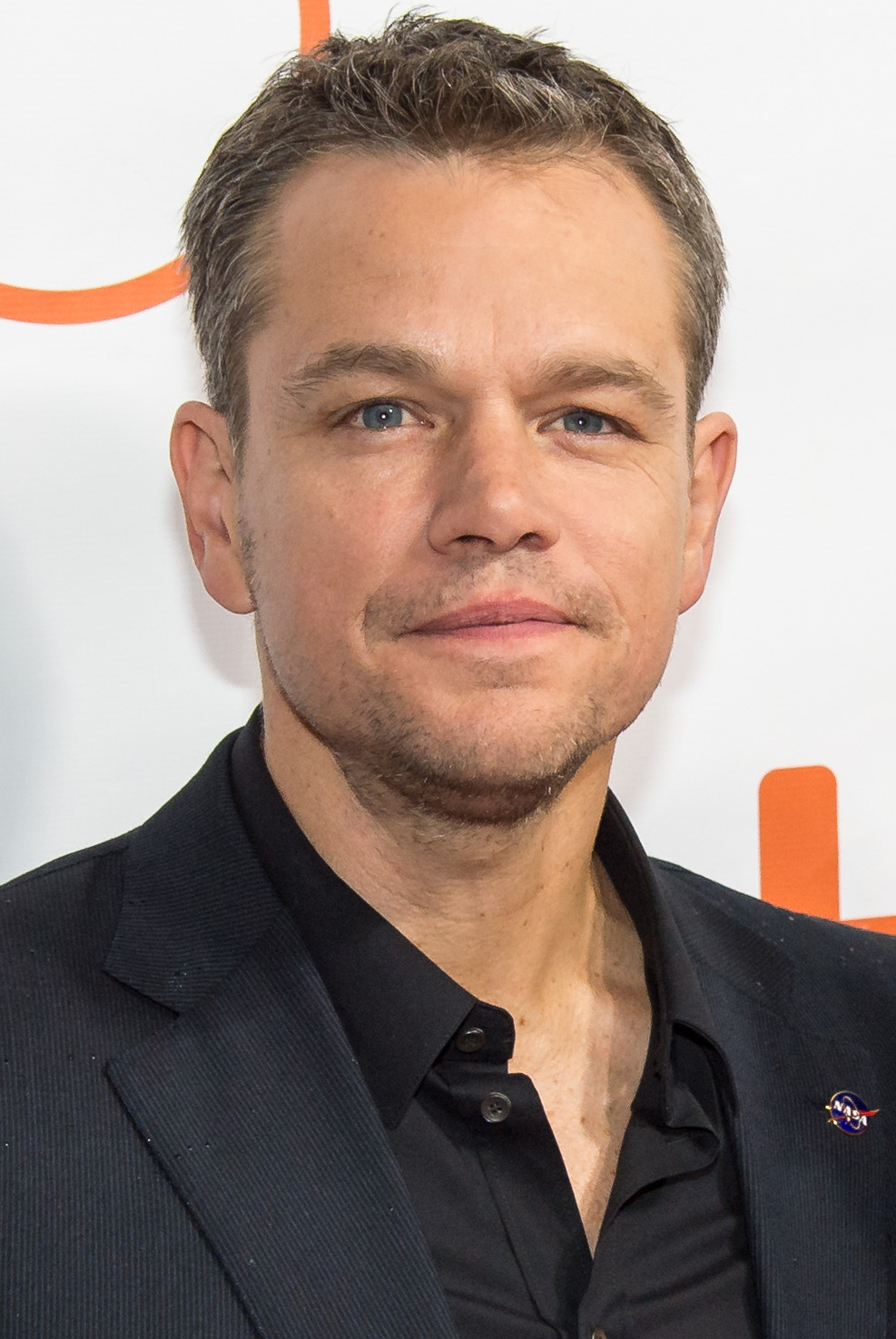
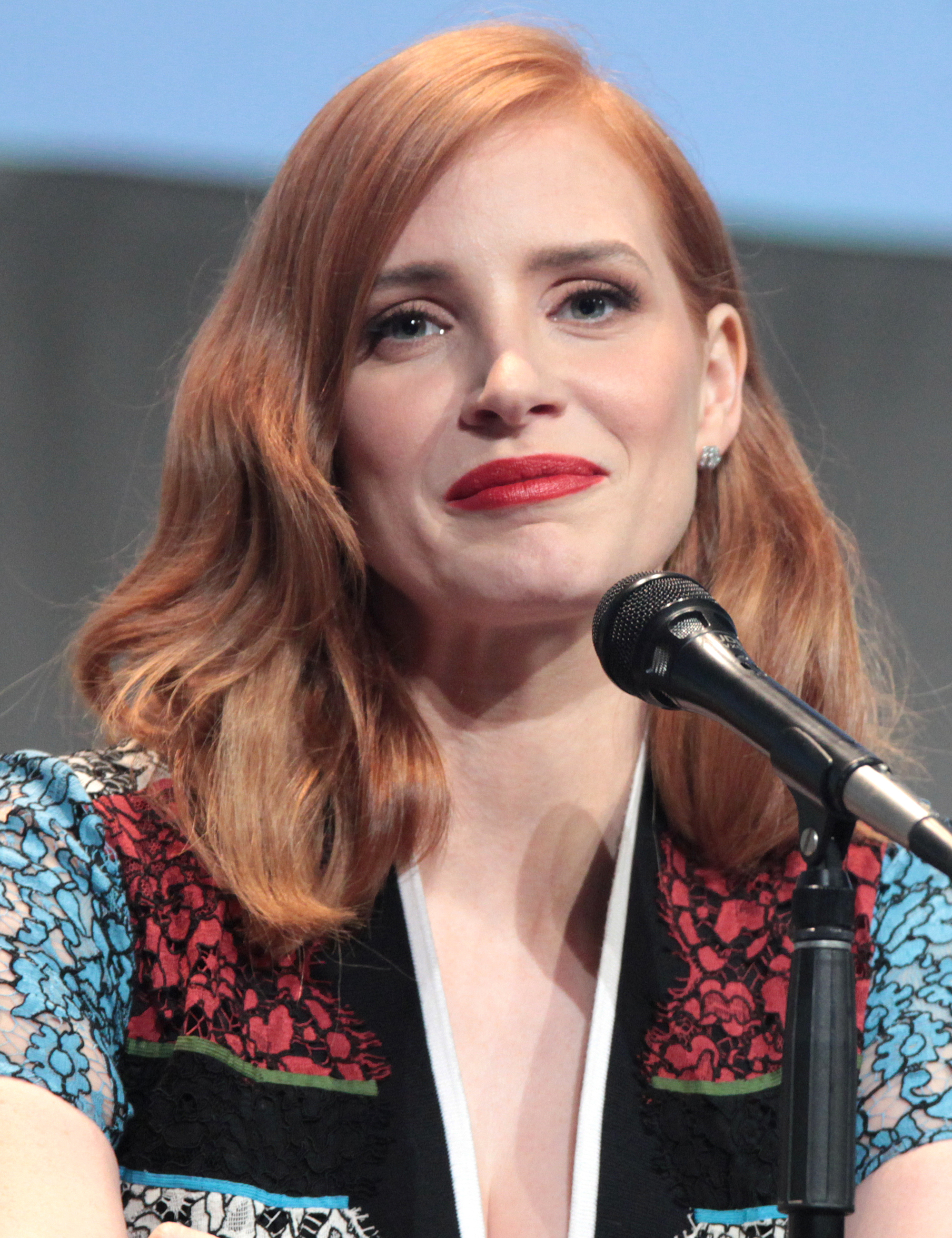
Matt Damon and Jessica Chastain (both pictured in 2015)
- Matt Damon as Dr. Mark Watney, a botanist and mechanical engineer who is part of the Ares III team.
- Jessica Chastain as Commander Melissa Lewis, USN Submarine Warfare officer, oceanographer, geologist and the Ares III mission commander.
- Chiwetel Ejiofor as Vincent Kapoor, NASA's Director of Mars Missions.
- Kristen Wiig as Annie Montrose, the director of media relations for NASA.
- Jeff Daniels as Theodore "Teddy" Sanders, the Administrator of NASA.
- Michael Peña as Major Rick Martinez, USAF officer, engineer, pilot of the Ares III mission for MAV.
- Sean Bean as Mitch Henderson, the Hermes flight director
- Kate Mara as Beth Johanssen, the Ares III's system operator.
- Sebastian Stan as Dr. Chris Beck, flight surgeon for the Ares III mission.
- Aksel Hennie as Dr. Alex Vogel, a German national who is the navigator and chemist of Ares III.
- Mackenzie Davis as Mindy Park, a satellite planner in Mission Control.
- Benedict Wong as Bruce Ng, director of Jet Propulsion Laboratory (JPL).
- Donald Glover as Rich Purnell, a JPL astrodynamicist.
- Chen Shu as Zhu Tao (Chinese: 朱涛), deputy chief scientist at the China National Space Administration.
- Eddy Ko as Guo Ming (Chinese: 郭明), chief scientist at the China National Space Administration.
- Nick Mohammed as Tim Grimes, a JPL engineer operating Pathfinder.

Chastain prepared for her role by meeting with astronauts and scientists at the Jet Propulsion Laboratory and the Lyndon B. Johnson Space Center. She was inspired by astronaut Tracy Caldwell Dyson, saying, "She's very matter of fact, very straightforward. My character is dealing with the guilt of leaving a crew member behind, but she's still responsible for the lives of five other crew mates. I tried to play her as Tracy would have been in those moments." Damon prepared for the role by a different method: "For me, the rehearsal process was sitting with Ridley and going kind of line-by-line and moment-by-moment through the script and playing out a plan of attack for what we wanted each scene to accomplish."

The Media Action Network for Asian-Americans (MANAA) criticized the casting of white actress Mackenzie Davis as Mindy Park, whom it said author Andy Weir had described as Korean-American. The group also criticized the casting of Chiwetel Ejiofor as Vincent Kapoor, whom the organization said Weir described as an Asian Indian character. In the novel, the character's name was Venkat Kapoor, and he identifies religiously as a Hindu (a Baptist and a Hindu in the film). The group described these casting decisions as whitewashing, part of a broader phenomenon that deprives Asian actors of opportunities. Weir said in October 2015 he perceived Mindy Park as Korean but said he did not explicitly write her as Korean. He also dismissed criticism of Ejiofor's casting, saying that Kapoor is "an American. Americans come from lots of different sources. You can be Venkat Kapoor and black." He said his novel intentionally avoided physical descriptions of his characters.

Naomi Scott was cast and filmed as Ryoko, a member of the JPL team. Her scenes were removed from the final cut.

== Production ==
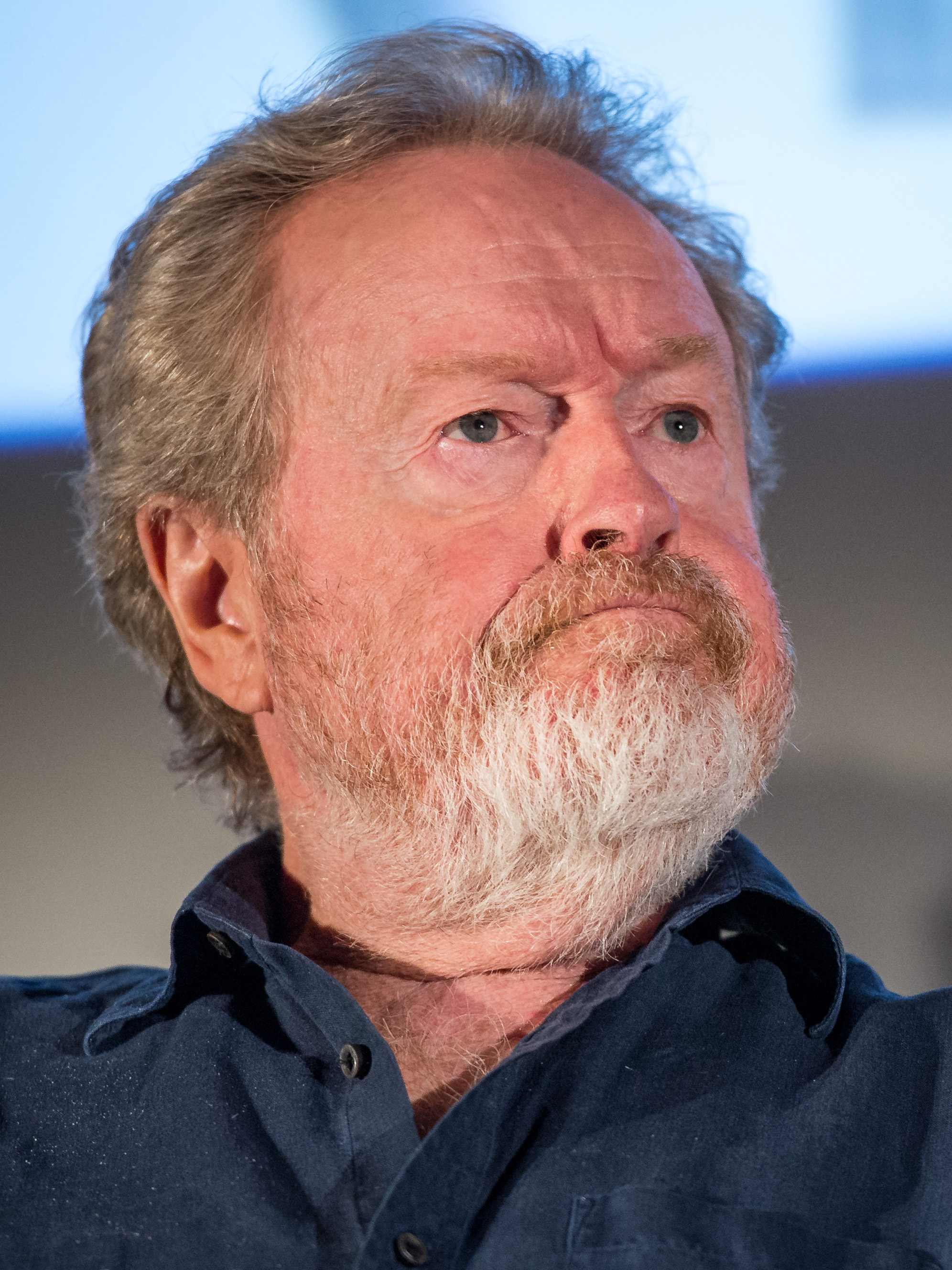
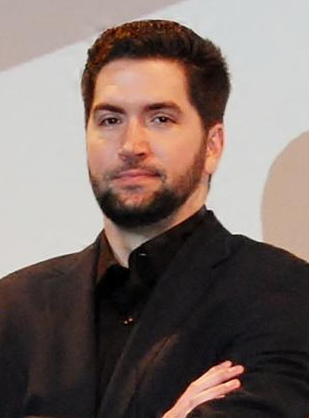
Director Ridley Scott and screenwriter Drew Goddard

=== Development ===
The Martian was directed by Ridley Scott and based on a screenplay by Drew Goddard that was adapted from Weir's 2011 novel of the same name. 20th Century Fox optioned the novel in March 2013, and producer Simon Kinberg was attached to develop the novel into a film. The following May, Goddard entered negotiations with the studio to write and direct The Martian. Goddard wrote a screenplay for the film and Matt Damon expressed interest in starring under Goddard's direction. Goddard then pursued an opportunity to direct Sinister Six, a comic book film about a team of supervillains. Kinberg then brought the book to Scott's attention.

In May 2014, Scott entered negotiations with the studio to direct the film with Damon cast as the film's stranded astronaut. Scott said he was attracted by the emphasis on science and thought a balance could be struck between entertainment and learning. Damon said he was attracted by the novel, the screenplay, and the opportunity to work with Scott. Following Scott's commitment, the project picked up the pace and was quickly approved. Goddard has since expressed that he felt Scott made a much better film than he could have directed, telling Creative Screenwriting, "When it's Scott, collaboration is easy because I just revere him. Every day I would just look around and think, 'Is that really Ridley Scott sitting there at the table? This is exciting!'"

=== Filming ===
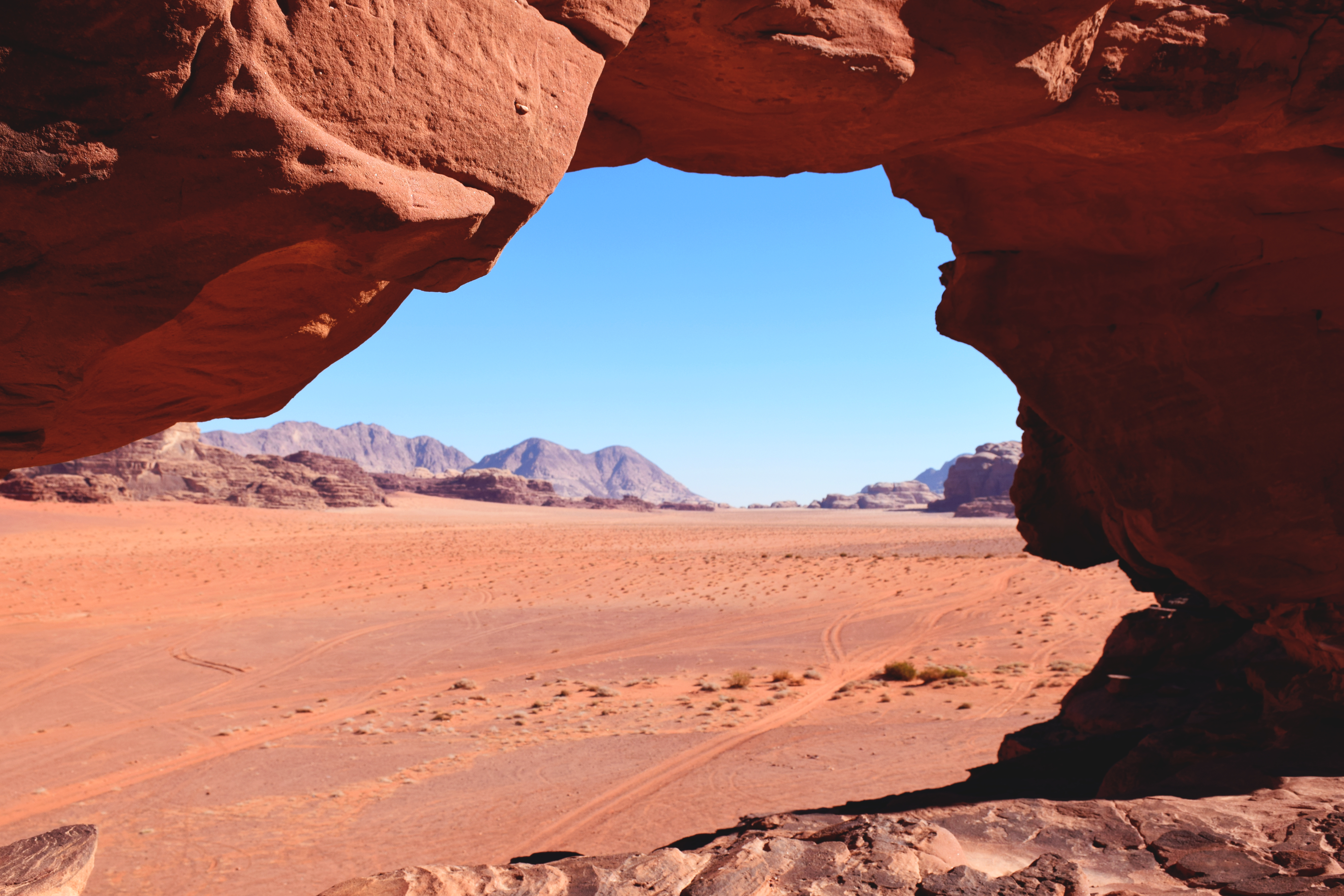
Wadi Rum in Jordan was used for external scenes on Mars in filming The Martian.

Korda Studios, a location 26 kilometres (16 mi) west of Budapest, Hungary, in the wine-making village of Etyek, was chosen for filming interior scenes of The Martian. It had one of the largest sound stages in the world. Filming began in Hungary on November 24, 2014. Around 20 sets were constructed for the film, which was filmed with 3D cameras. Actual potatoes were grown in a sound stage next to the one used for filming. They were planted at different times so that different stages of growth could be shown in film scenes. A team of six people built 15 suits for the film. External scenes depicting Mars were filmed in Wadi Rum, a UNESCO world heritage site in Jordan, over eight days in March 2015. Wadi Rum had been used as a location for other films set on Mars, including Mission to Mars (2000), Red Planet (2000) and The Last Days on Mars (2013). All told, filming lasted about 70 days. A special Mars rover model was built for the filming; the film cast and team presented the rover model to Jordan in return for the hospitality they had received. The rover is now exhibited in Jordan's Royal Automobile Museum.

Weir avoided writing Watney as lonely and depressed in his novel. While Watney's humor is preserved in the film, Scott also depicted the character's isolation in the vast, dusty Martian landscape. Todd McCarthy of The Hollywood Reporter wrote: "The scenes back on Earth provide a hectic, densely populated counterweight to the Martian aridity, which is magnificently represented by exteriors shot in the vicinity of Wadi Rum in Jordan." Damon said he and Scott were inspired by the documentary film Touching the Void (2003), which featured trapped mountain climbers. Scott also expected to film Watney as a Robinson Crusoe, a character in full isolation, but learned to film Watney differently since the character would be self-monitoring his behavior under the watch of various mission cameras.

According to Scott, the first cut of the film was 2 hours and 45 minutes long. An extended cut of the film was released on home video.

=== NASA involvement ===
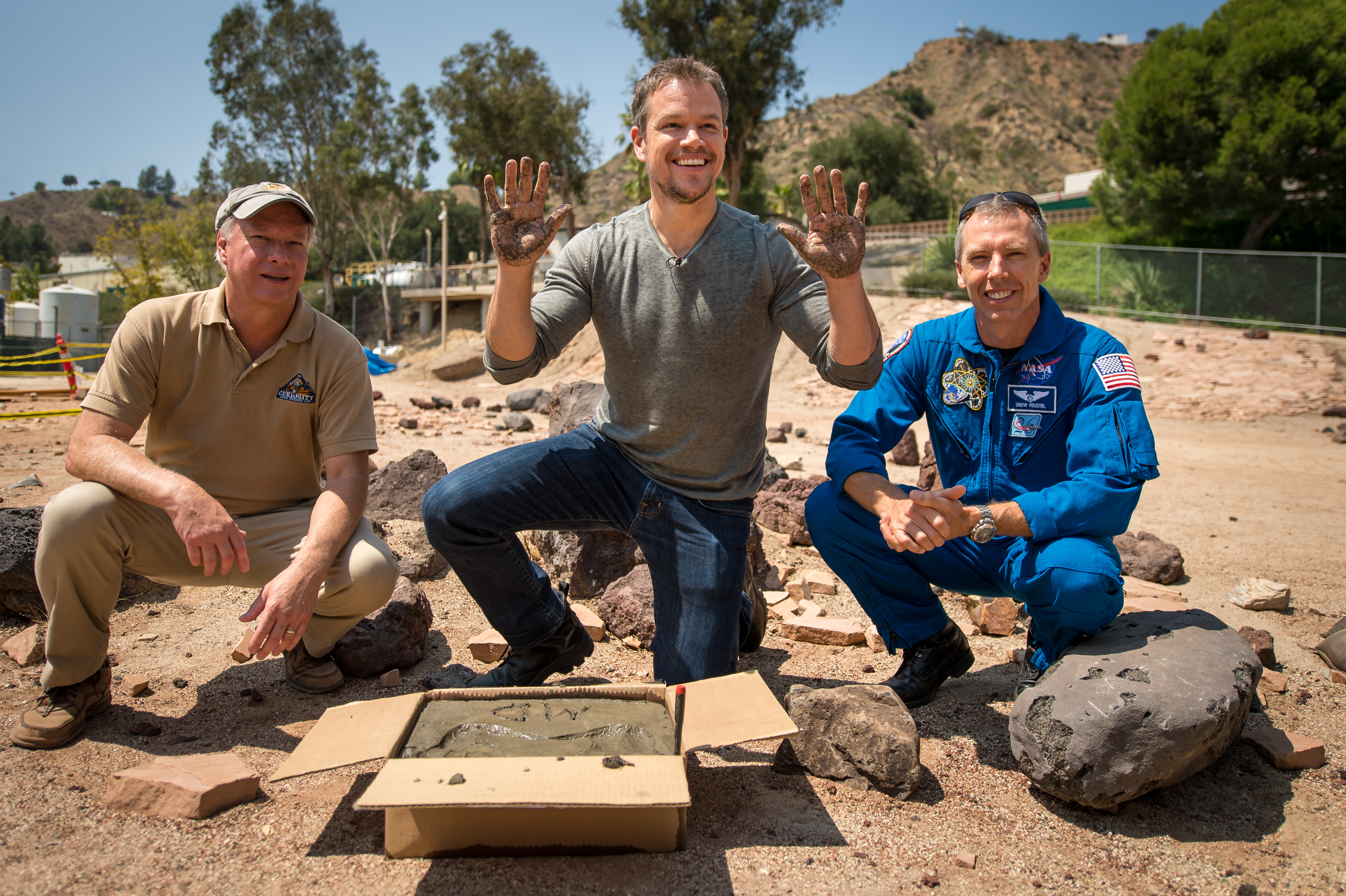
Damon while making hand prints in concrete at the Jet Propulsion Laboratory. He is accompanied by Jim Erickson (left) and Andrew J. Feustel (right).

When the novel was first published, NASA invited Weir to tour the Johnson Space Center and Jet Propulsion Laboratory. When Scott began preparing the film, Weir contacted NASA to collaborate on the film. When Scott and producer Mark Huffam had their first production meeting, they called NASA and spoke with its film and television liaison Bert Ulrich. NASA decided to help the filmmakers with depicting the science and technology in The Martian since it saw potential in promoting space exploration.

NASA staff members that joined the effort included James L. Green, director of the Planetary Science Division, and Dave Lavery, program executive for Solar System Exploration. Scott conversed with Green twice before filming started. During one month, NASA answered hundreds of questions on radioisotope systems, the look of potential "habs"—the residences for future Mars astronauts—and more. The questions were answered by Green or passed on to the right expert, and then came back to Scott's team to make their way into the production. The space agency also provided hundreds of real images of Mars and control centers, down to what the computer screens look like. Green arranged an eight-hour tour of the Johnson Space Center in Houston for production designer Arthur Max, who met with specialists and took hundreds of photos. The production designer created a futuristic, heavily modernized Mission Control as a studio set; Ars Technica described its depiction as "the space agency that we all dream of" and the opposite of the real Johnson Center's appearance as "a run down college campus".

Newsweek said NASA collaborated more with The Martian than most other space-themed films: "Staff from many NASA departments consulted on the film, from script development through principal photography, and are now helping with marketing timed to the theatrical release." As part of the collaboration, the production's NASA liaison included the front page of the script for the film in the payload of the spacecraft Orion during its Exploration Flight Test 1 on December 5, 2014.

The Los Angeles Times said NASA and the wider scientific community anticipated the film as a way to publicize a human mission to Mars. The New York Times reports that the film "serves as a nice plug for NASA, which has returned the favor by pushing the movie on its website. (On Monday [September 28, 2015], scientists announced that signs of liquid water could be seen in photographs taken on Mars by a camera on the Mars Reconnaissance Orbiter, timing that suggests NASA certainly has the whole cross-promotion thing down.)" Jim Erickson, NASA project manager, said the film would show moviegoers "the risks and rewards" of humans traveling to Mars.

In October 2015, NASA presented a new web tool to follow Watney's trek across Mars and details of NASA's next steps, as well as a health hazards report for a real-world human journey to Mars.

In 2016, then-US President Barack Obama named The Martian as among the best science fiction films he had ever seen.

== Music ==
Harry Gregson-Williams composed the score for The Martian. It is the fourth collaboration between Gregson-Williams and Scott. Gregson-Williams previously worked on music for Scott's films Kingdom of Heaven (2005), Prometheus (2012) and Exodus: Gods and Kings, composing the main film score for the first and last films, and doing additional music for the other two.

A running gag in the film is commander Melissa Lewis' love for 1970s songs (especially of the disco genre, which apparently Watney hates), the only music available to Watney on Mars which often appears as diegetic music. The soundtrack includes:

- "Turn the Beat Around" by Vicki Sue Robinson
- "Hot Stuff" by Donna Summer
- "Rock the Boat" by The Hues Corporation
- "Don't Leave Me This Way" by Thelma Houston
- "Starman" by David Bowie
- "Waterloo" by ABBA
- "Love Train" by The O'Jays
- "I Will Survive" by Gloria Gaynor (closing credits)

The exit music, which includes "Don't Leave Me This Way" and "I Will Survive," is a commentary on Watney's situation on Mars.

== Marketing ==
20th Century Fox launched a viral marketing campaign for The Martian. On June 7, 2015, NASA astronaut Michael J. Massimino shared an in-universe video diary depicting Damon's character and the other crew members. Ars Technica compared the video diary to similar viral videos marketed for Scott's 2012 film Prometheus in having a similar "style of slickly produced fictional promotional material". The marketing video was awarded two Webby Awards in 2016. The studio then released an official trailer on June 8. Forbes said, "20th Century Fox has cut together a pretty perfect trailer in that it absolutely makes the sale. It establishes the stakes, offers a sympathetic lead character, shows off an all-star cast, tosses out a potential catchphrase, and ends on a grimly humorous tagline." In response to the trailer, Jimmy Kimmel, host of the late-night talk show Jimmy Kimmel Live!, released a spoof trailer, The Mastronaut: Emission to Mars, that edited the original to parody the film.

At the start of August, Fox released another video, depicting interviews with each of the main crew members. Mid-month, the studio released another film trailer, and NASA hosted a "Martian Day" at the Jet Propulsion Laboratory to both promote The Martian and highlight the space program's ongoing efforts to carry out a human mission to Mars. At the end of August, Fox released another video, presenting it as a special episode of the TV series StarTalk in which astrophysicist Neil deGrasse Tyson discusses the hazards of traveling to Mars. In September, Scott's RSA Films released a teaser for The Martian that depicted Damon wearing Under Armour sports clothing and being active in his off-world tasks. The teaser originated from a collaboration between RSA Films and the marketing shop 3AM (the theatrical advertising arm of the agency Wild Card), initiated in 2014, to produce advertising content for The Martian. RSA contacted the advertising agency Droga5, under whom Under Armour is a client. Droga5 ultimately collaborated with WME and 3AM to produce the teaser.

NASA participated in the marketing of the film despite its lack of involvement with previous films. Though it turned down a request for Interstellar to be screened on the ISS, The Martian was screened on board 402 km (250 miles) above the Earth's surface on September 19, 2015, and also at the Johnson Space Center in Houston, and at the Kennedy Space Center at Cape Canaveral on October 1, 2015.

In November 2015, 20th Century Fox announced The Martian VR Experience, a "virtual reality adventure" where viewers play as Mark Watney and reenact scenes from the film. The project was executive produced by Scott alongside Joel Newton and directed by Robert Stromberg. It was released for HTC Vive and PlayStation VR on November 15, 2016, and is also available for the Oculus Rift and Samsung Gear VR. The project won 2 major awards; a Silver Lion at the Cannes Film Festival and an AICP Award.

== Release ==
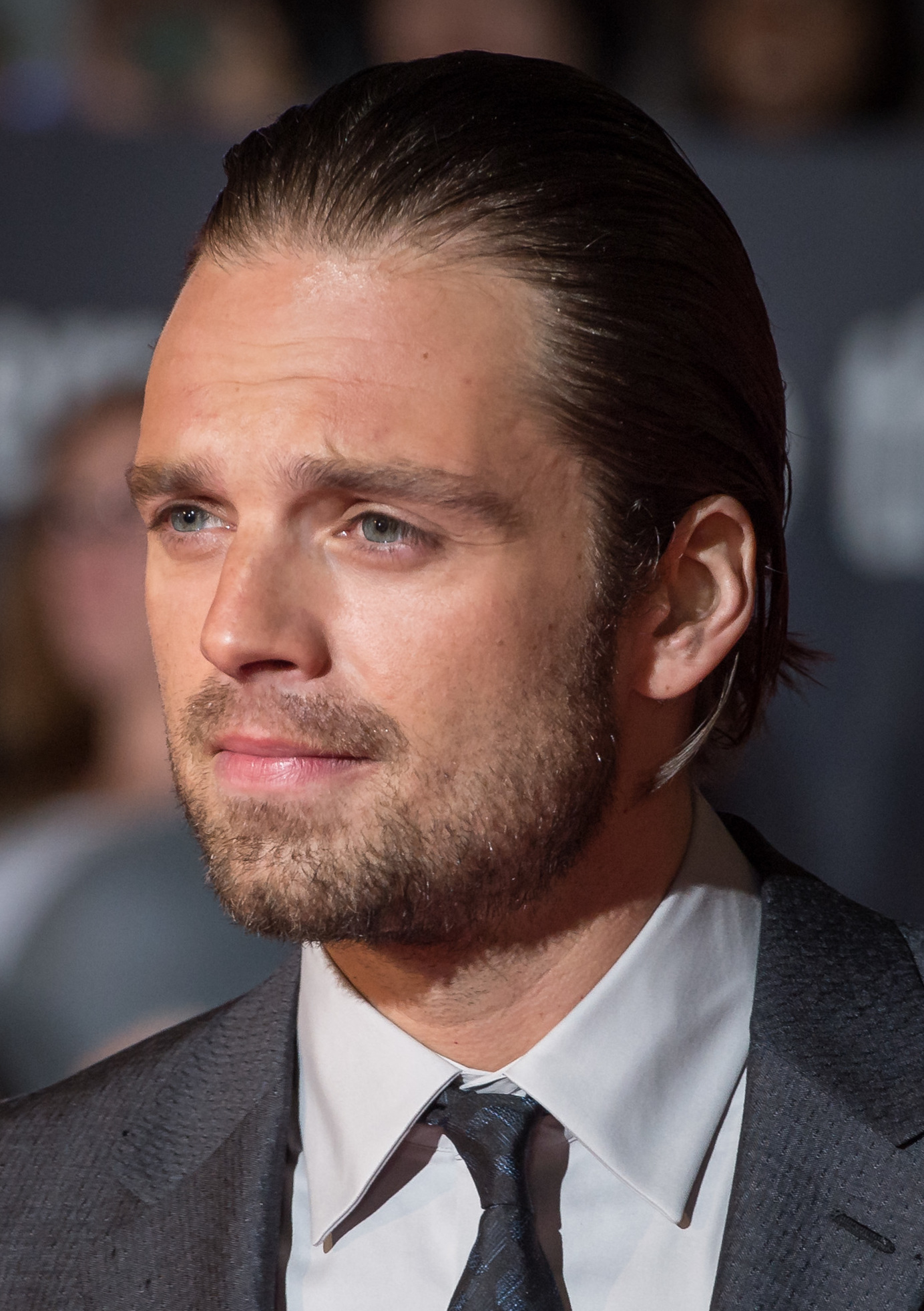
Sebastian Stan at the premiere of the film at the 2015 Toronto International Film Festival

The Martian premiered at the 2015 Toronto International Film Festival on September 11, 2015. The film screened in a sneak preview at the New York Film Festival on September 27, 2015. It also screened at Fantastic Fest in Austin, Texas, on September 29, 2015. The film was released in the Dolby Vision format in Dolby Cinema in North America.

=== Box office forecast ===
Two months before The Martian's release, BoxOffice forecast that the film would gross $46 million on its opening weekend in the United States and ultimately $172 million in its theatrical run. The magazine said positive factors for its performance included the continued sales of Weir's novel, Scott's success with past science fiction films, and the positive reception of prior space-based films Gravity (2013) and Interstellar (2014). The magazine said negative factors included Damon not being a consistent draw at the box office, Gravity and Interstellar setting high expectations, and Scott's "stumble" with his previous film Exodus: Gods and Kings (2014). A week before the film's release, pre-release trackings in North America (United States and Canada) showed that the film was on pace to earn between $40–50 million at its opening weekend from 3,826 theaters.

In comparison to other contemporary space films, Gravity, facing far less competition, opened to a better-than-expected $55.8 million in 2013. In November 2014, Interstellar debuted to $47.5 million. Unlike Gravity and Interstellar, which had the benefit of IMAX locations, boosting profits, The Martian was not initially playing in IMAX, since IMAX was committed to an exclusive run of Robert Zemeckis' The Walk. The Martian played in more than 350 premium large-format theaters including 2,550 3D locations. Also, the film was released several days after the announcement of NASA's discovery of water on Mars' planetary surface, which might have aided in boosting its opening. Ticket selling website Fandango reported that the film was outselling Gravity. Unlike Gravity, The Martian did not contain abundant 3D spectacle (even though it was filmed in 3D), and was longer than Gravity.

=== Theatrical run ===
The Martian was a financial success. It grossed $228.4 million in the United States & Canada and $425.2 million in other countries, for a worldwide total of $653.6 million against a budget of $108 million. Worldwide, it was the tenth-highest-grossing film of 2015. Deadline Hollywood calculated the net profit of the film to be $150.32 million, accounting for production budgets, P&A, talent participations, and other costs, with box office grosses, and ancillary revenues from home media, placing it tenth on their list of 2015's "Most Valuable Blockbusters"; and The Hollywood Reporter reported around $80–100 million profits for the film.

The film was released in theaters in 2D and 3D. In the United Kingdom, it was released on September 30, 2015, a Wednesday, and in the United States on the following Friday, October 2, 2015. It was also released in 49 markets including Mexico, Hong Kong, India and Taiwan from the weekend October 2–4, 2015 and expanded to Germany, Russia, and South Korea the following weekend. It opened in Spain on October 16, then France on October 21. China opened on November 25 and Japan bowed in the first quarter of 2016 on February 5. Various sites estimated the film to gross between $45 and $50 million over its opening weekend in the United States.

In North America, it opened on Friday, October 2, 2015, and earned $18.06 million on its opening day of which $2 million came from premium large formats from 3,831 theaters. The film's Friday gross included $2.5 million from late-night Thursday screenings that took place in 2,800 theaters. During its opening weekend, it earned $54.3 million from 3,831 theaters ranking first at the box office which is the second biggest October opening, behind Gravity ($55.7 million) and the second biggest for Scott, behind Hannibal ($58 million) and Damon, behind The Bourne Ultimatum ($69.2 million). The film made $6 million at 375 premium large format screens. 3D accounted for 45% of the ticket sales while RealD 3D accounted for 42% or $23 million of that sales which is one of highest for the 3D company in 2015. The film fell short of breaking Gravity's record which might have been hurt by Hurricane Joaquin, the NFL season and the last day of the Major League Baseball regular season. In its second weekend of release, it dropped gradually by 31.9% and earned $37 million from 3,854 theaters (+23 theaters) maintaining the top position. The Martian's demographics in its sophomore weekend remained in sync with its opening frame drawing 52% males and 72% over 25. It topped the box office for two consecutive weekends before being dethroned by Goosebumps in its third weekend after a close race between the two ($23.6 million for Goosebumps and $21.3 million for The Martian). It returned to the top of the box office for the third time in its fourth weekend, and went on the top the box office for four non-consecutive weekends before being overtaken by Spectre in its fifth weekend. On November 5, the film surpassed Gladiator ($187.7 million) to become Scott's highest-grossing film at the domestic box office.

Internationally, The Martian was released in a total of 81 countries. Outside North America, it opened on the same weekend in 54 markets and grossed $44.6 million from 9,299 screens topping the international box office as well as opening at No. 1 in over 15 markets. The following weekend, it added 23 more markets and grossed an estimated $57.5 million from 77 markets from 12,859 screens. Its opening weekends in South Korea ($12.5 million) (Note: The film opened in Korea during the three-day Hangul Day Holiday and earned almost $12.5 million from 1.81 million admissions over four days. It is Ridley Scott's highest-opening film in Korea, surpassing Robin Hood, which grossed $10.2 million from 1.6 million admissions in 2010 and Fox's biggest opening weekend of all time in the market and the biggest ever October opening.), the United Kingdom, Ireland and Malta ($10.2 million), Russia and the CIS ($7.4 million), France ($6.9 million), Australia ($4.5 million) and Germany ($4.3 million; behind Inside Out) represented its largest takings. In terms of total earnings, the United Kingdom ($35.3 million), South Korea ($33.6 million), Australia ($16.57 million) and Germany ($16 million) are the top markets. In South Korea, it became Fox's third-highest-grossing film ever behind Avatar (2009) and Kingsman: The Secret Service (2015). It topped the box office outside of North America for two consecutive weekends before being overtaken by Ant-Man in its third weekend but returned to the top in its fourth weekend. In its fifth weekend, it was surpassed by Spectre thereby topping the international box office for three weekends in total. The Martian opened in China on Wednesday, November 25 and earned $50 million in its five-day opening weekend from 4,848 screens of which $6.6 million came from 249 IMAX theaters. In its second weekend, it fell by 60% to $13.7 million, while in total, it grossed $95 million there. It opened in Japan on February 5, 2016, under the name Odyssey, where it earned $5.2 million from 8,333 screens in its three-day opening weekend, debuting at No. 1 at the box office and helped the film push past the $600 million mark. Its Saturday and Sunday take was $4.25 million. It dropped just 19% in its second after adding $3.4 million. It has topped the box office there for four consecutive weekends and as of February 28 has grossed a total of $23.2 million.

For its United States release, the film was originally scheduled to be released on November 25, 2015, but 20th Century Fox switched The Martian with Victor Frankenstein so that the former would be its first film for all audiences in the country's fall season (September–November). On the film's 3D screenings, RealD's chief Anthony Marcoly said 3D technology was proliferating from action-packed blockbuster films commonly released in the United States' summer season. Marcoly said the technology was being used in more immersive storytelling, citing The Martian and The Walk (released the same year) as two examples.

=== Home media ===
The Martian was released on Digital on December 22, 2015 and on Blu-ray and DVD on January 12, 2016. It was released on 4K Ultra HD Blu-ray on February 14, 2016. An extended cut of the film adding an additional ten minutes was released on June 7, 2016.

== Reception ==
=== Critical response ===
On the review aggregator Rotten Tomatoes, 91% of 384 critics gave the film a positive review and the average rating was 7.9/10. The website's critics consensus read, "Smart, thrilling, and surprisingly funny, The Martian offers a faithful adaptation of the bestselling book that brings out the best in leading man Matt Damon and director Ridley Scott." Metacritic, which uses a weighted average, assigned the film a score of 80 out of 100 based on 46 critics indicating "generally favorable" reviews. Audiences polled by CinemaScore gave the film an average grade of "A" on an A+ to F scale, while PostTrak reported filmgoers gave it an average 4.5 out of 5 and a 66% "definite recommend". Audience demographics were 54% men and a total of 59% over 35.

According to Rotten Tomatoes, critics said that the film "finds Scott examining more hopeful territory, and the result is an awe-inspiring adventure that explores vast ideas while staying grounded in very human emotional territory. [...] The Martian is visually stunning, scientifically credible, and immensely likable, thanks in large part to Damon's funny, touching performance." Variety reported, "Critics are calling the film a funny, thrilling ride, and a return to form for [Ridley] Scott after The Counselor and Exodus: Gods and Kings fell flat." In The Guardian, aerospace engineer Robert Zubrin commented:

[The film] is the first genuine Mars movie. It is the first movie that attempts to be realistic and that is actually about human beings grappling with the problems of exploring Mars, as opposed to various movies set on Mars that are essentially either shoot'em ups or horror films. It does not engage in fantasy: no monsters, no magic, no Nazis. However, there are a number of technical mistakes.

Manohla Dargis, of The New York Times, stated that the film "involves a dual journey into outer and inner space, a trip that takes you into that immensity called the universe and deep into the equally vast landscape of a single consciousness. For this accidental castaway, space is the place where he's physically marooned, but also where his mind is set free", from a film director, whose "great, persistent theme is what it means to be human".

Negative reviews focused on the lack of character depth or atmosphere. Jaime N. Christley, writing in Slant Magazine, commented, "It goes in for the idea of texture, tics, and human behavior, but there's no conviction, and no real push for eccentricity. ... It hardly seems interested in its characters or in any depiction of their work, settling instead for types of characters and kinds of scenes, correctly placed among the pendulum swings of Watney's dramatic journey." In The Village Voice, Stephanie Zacharek stated that the actors "are treated as accessories", and that the director is "workmanlike in his approach to science, which always trumps magic in The Martian—that's the point. But if we can't feel a sense of wonder at the magnitude and mystery of space, why even bother?" In Cinemixtape, J. Olson commented: "Ridley Scott and company have concocted the most colossally mediocre sci-fi movie of the decade, all in pursuit of empty backslapping and a grade school level celebration of science. Not only is The Martian not in the same class as Scott's two masterpieces – Alien and Blade Runner – it's not even on the same continent."

=== Accolades ===
At the 88th Academy Awards, The Martian received nominations for Best Picture, Best Actor, Best Adapted Screenplay, Best Production Design, Best Sound Editing, Best Sound Mixing, and Best Visual Effects. The film's other nominations include six British Academy Film Awards, nine Critics' Choice Movie Awards, and three Golden Globe Awards (winning two). It received four National Board of Review Awards and was named one of the top-ten films of 2015 by the American Film Institute. Solanum watneyi, a species of bush tomato from Australia, has been named after the character of Mark Watney, to honor the fictional heroic botanist portrayal. It is a member of the same genus as the potato, Solanum. In 2025, it was one of the films voted for the "Readers' Choice" edition of The New York Times' list of "The 100 Best Movies of the 21st Century," finishing at number 174.

== Scientific accuracy ==
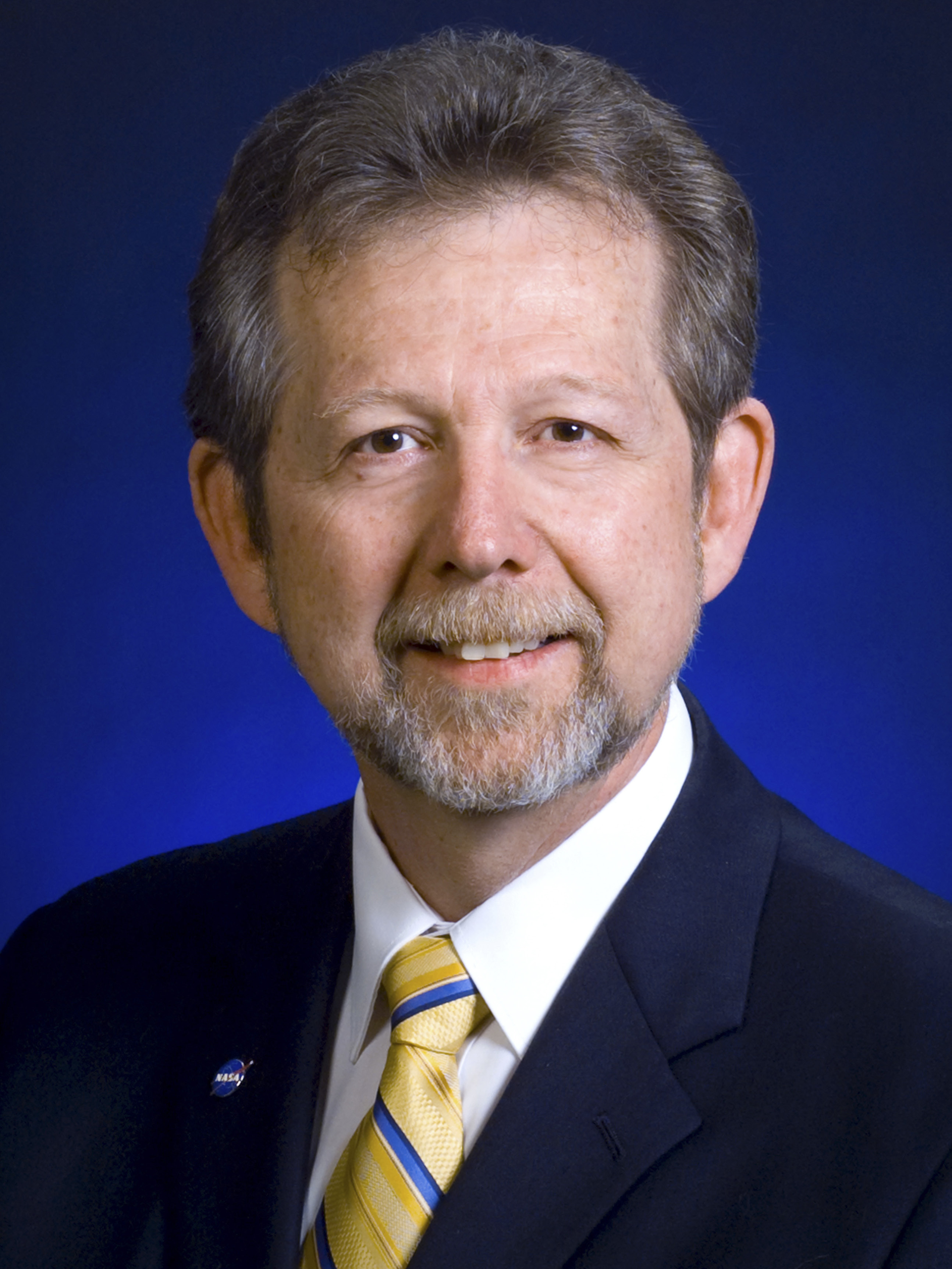
James L. Green, the Director of the Planetary Science Division at NASA's Science Mission Directorate, worked as an adviser for the film.

When Weir wrote the novel The Martian, he strove to present the science correctly and used reader feedback to get it right. When Scott began directing the film, he also sought to make it realistic and received help from James L. Green, the Director of the Planetary Science Division at NASA's Science Mission Directorate. Green put together teams to answer scientific questions that Scott asked. Green said, "The Martian is reasonably realistic", though he said the film's hazardous dust storm, despite reaching speeds of 120 miles per hour (190 km/h), would in reality have weak force. Green also found the NASA buildings in the film to be more stylish than the functional ones NASA actually uses. Film critics picked up the point that the Martian winds could amount to "barely a light breeze" in their reviews, and screenwriter Goddard agreed the winds had to be considerably exaggerated to set up the situation that sets the story in motion.

The process used by the character Watney to produce water is chemically accurate and theoretically possible. The radioisotope thermoelectric generator was also appropriately used for heat. When his rations begin to run low, Watney builds an improvised garden using Martian soil and the crew's feces as a fertilizer. However, Martian soil has since been found to be toxic to both plant and animal life, although it is believed that microbial organisms have the potential to live on Mars.

Jeffrey Kluger of Time magazine criticized a depiction of duct tape based repair: "When a pressure leak causes an entire pod on Watney's habitat to blow up, he patches a yawning opening in what's left of the dwelling with plastic tarp and PSA duct tape." Such a repair would not work in an average Martian temperature of −60 °C (−76 °F).

While Martian gravity is less than 40% of Earth's, director Scott chose not to depict the gravitational difference, finding the effort less worthwhile to put on screen than zero gravity. Scott said the heavy spacesuits would weigh the main character enough to make up for not showing the partial gravity.

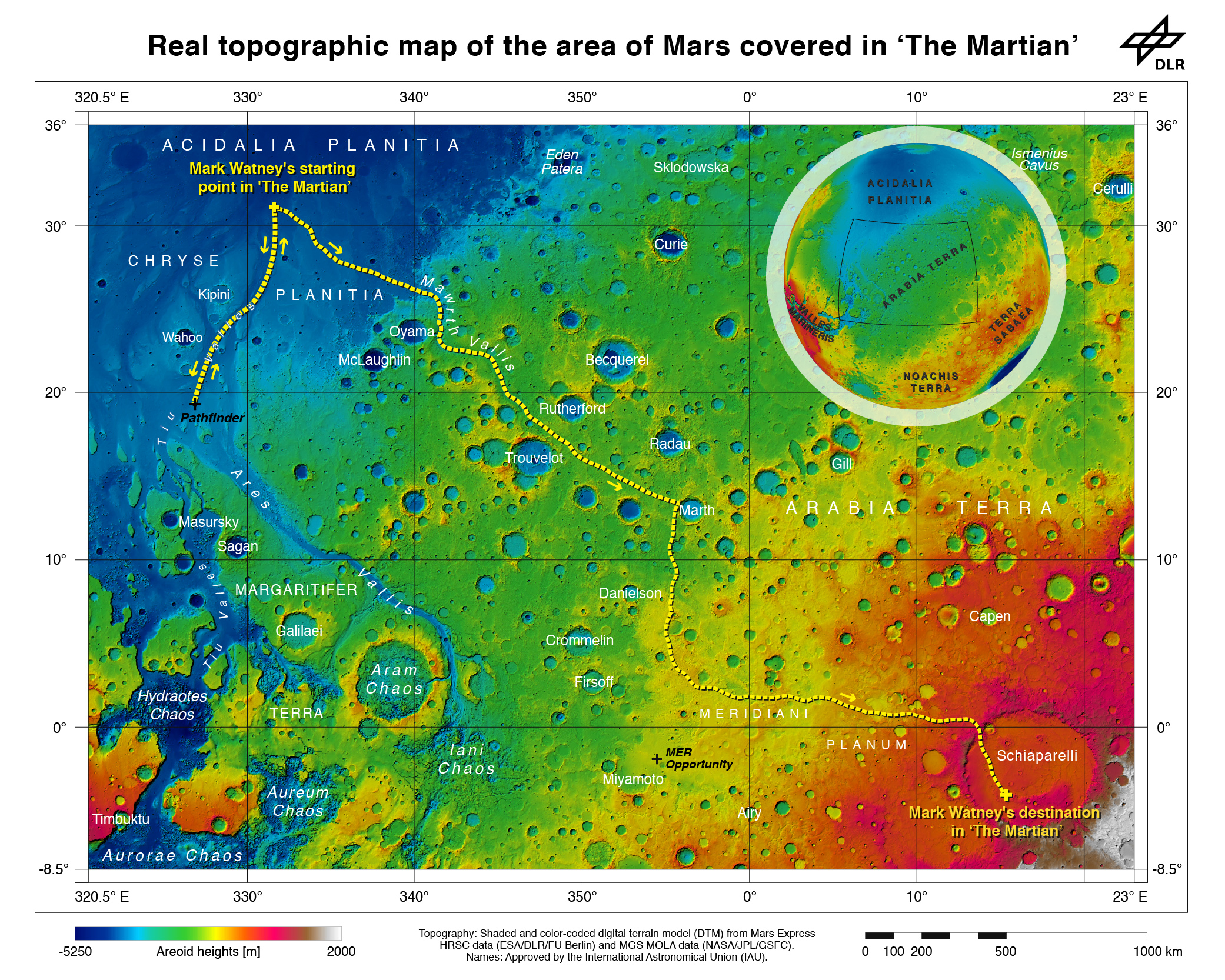
Mark Watney's route on Mars

The plot key to the eventual rescue plan is gravity assist, a well-known practice that has been used on a number of robotic planetary exploration missions and served as a backup strategy on crewed Apollo missions. It would have been one of the first approaches that everyone within NASA would have considered.

Ed Finn, director of the Center for Science and the Imagination at Arizona State University, said, "What this story does really well is imagine a near-future scenario that doesn't push too far off where we are today technically." British physicist Brian Cox said, "The Martian is the best advert for a career in engineering I've ever seen."

== See also ==
- Astrobotany and astrobiology
- List of films set on Mars
- Mars in fiction
- Martian
- Oxia Palus quadrangle
- Robinsonade
- Survival film
