= James B. Adams (composer) =

English composer, organist, and cellist

James Blake Adams (c. 1749 – after 1794) was an English composer, organist, and cellist. He is known for many small instrumental and vocal compositions between 1770 and 1820. He is best known for the song, The Nightingale, which remains popular.

He was organist for Brompton Chapel in 1784 and is known to have performed cello in various concerts from then on, most notably the Handel commemoration concerts of 1784 and the annual concerts for the relief of the clergy at St. Paul's Cathedral.

== His compositions ==
Adams changed his musical style from time to time. His early songs on the harpsichord had the manner of Thomas Arne, his canzonets accompanied by chamber orchestra referred slightly to J. C. Bach, and his violin and cello sonatas were close to the works of Haydn.

== Books ==
- A Familiar Introduction to the First Principles of Music, 1815.
