= James Barton Adams =

American poet

James Barton Adams (April 17, 1843 – April 22, 1918) was one of the few cowboy poets published in the 19th century, with the book, Breezy Western Verse in 1898. Adams' works were typically published in newspapers, as he was a telegraph operator and knew many journalists.

Adams was included in several collections, including John A. Lomax's Songs of the Cattle Train and Cow Camp (Macmillan Co., 1919). In 1945, Louis Untermeyer included Adams' poem, "Bill's in Trouble" in the collection, The Pocket Book of Story Poems (Pocket Books, Inc. 1945). Most recently, Adams' poems, The Cowboy's Dance Song and Cowboy Goes a Courtin, were included in the book, Cowboy Love Poetry: Verse from the Heart of the West (Angel City Press, 1994).
