= James Adams (archdeacon of Kildare) =

James Adams (1780-1864) was the last discrete Archdeacon of Kildare

Adams was educated at Moore Theological College and ordained in 1871. He served curacies in Townsville, Merston, Twickenham, Richmond and Greenwich. He became the Incumbent at Kill, County Kildare in 1878; Rural Dean of Naas in 1895; and Precentor of Kildare Cathedral in 1898. His son was killed in the First World War.
