= James Adams (footballer, born 1896) =

English footballer

Personal information
- Date of birth: 7 July 1896
- Place of birth: Chesterfield, England
- Date of death: 1973 (aged 76–77)
- Position: Forward

Senior career*
Years	Team	Apps	(Gls)
- Staveley Wesleyans
- Lowgates United
- Staveley United
1921	Chesterfield	6	(0)
- Staveley Town
- Matlock Town
- * Club domestic league appearances and goals

James Adams (born 1896) was an English footballer who played in the Football League for Chesterfield.
