= James Adams (Jesuit) =

English Jesuit and philologist (1737–1802)

James Adams (1737 – 6 December 1802) was an English Jesuit and philologist.

== Life ==
James Adams joined the English Jesuits in exile at their novitiate of Watten (France), on 7 September 1756. Afterwards, Adams taught belles-lettres at the English College of St. Omer. In 1773, he was a missionary in Aston, Stafford. He retired to Dublin in August, 1802, where he died on December 6.

== Works ==
Adams was the author of the following works.

- Early Rules for Taking a Likeness. with plates, London, 1792; translated from Bonamici.
- Oratio Academica Anglice et Latine. London, 1793.
- Euphonologia Linguae Anglicanae, Latine et Gallice, London, 1794; for which he received the thanks of the Royal Society.
- Rule Britannia, or the Flattery of Free Subjects Expounded; to which is added an Academical Discourse. London, 1798.
- A Sermon preached at the Catholic Chapel of St. Patrick, Sutton-street, on Wednesday, March 7, the Day of Public Fast. London, 1798.
- The Pronunciation of the English Language Vindicated. Edinburgh 1799.
