= List of African-American Republicans =

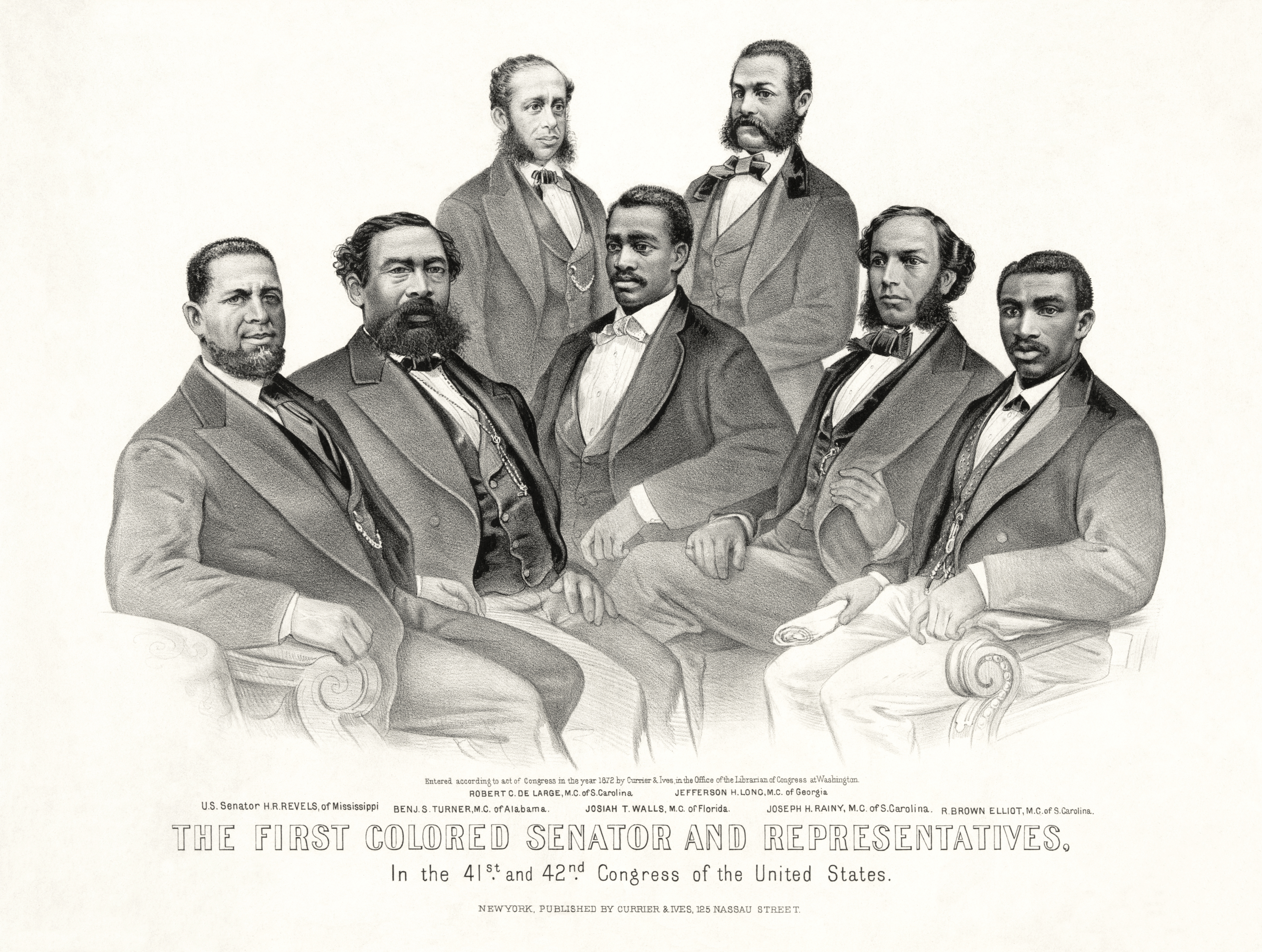
1872 Currier and Ives print showing the first black U.S. senator and representatives: Sen. Hiram Revels (R-MS), Rep. Benjamin S. Turner (R-AL), Robert DeLarge (R-SC), Josiah Walls (R-FL), Jefferson Long (R-GA), Joseph Rainey and Robert B. Elliott (R-SC), 1872

The following is a list of black Republicans, past and present. This list is limited to black Americans who have worked in a direct, professional capacity in politics.

== A ==
- Israel Abbott (1813–1887), Republican state representative from North Carolina, 1872–1874
- David Abner (1826–1902), Republican state representative from Texas, 1874–1875, vice president of Republican State Convention 1876
- Dinah Abrahamson (1954–2013), author, member of the Nebraska State Central Committee
- John O. Agwunobi, Assistant Secretary for Health (2006–2007)
- Ali Alexander (born 1984 or 1985), social media personality and activist, of African-American and Arab ancestry
- Archie Alexander (1888–1958), governor of the U.S. Virgin Islands
- Walter G. Alexander (1880–1953), first African-American to serve in the New Jersey Legislature
- Aris T. Allen (1910–1991), chair of the Maryland Republican Party
- Cheryl Lynn Allen (born 1947), judge of the Superior Court of Pennsylvania (2008–2015)
- Claude Allen (born 1960), White House domestic policy advisor
- Ethel D. Allen (1929–1981), Secretary of the Commonwealth of Pennsylvania, first African-American elected to Philadelphia City Council
- Richard Allen (1830–1909), member of the Texas House of Representatives
- James W. Ames (1864–1944), representative in the Michigan House of Representatives
- Renee Amoore (1953–2020), health care advocate; founder and president of the Amoore Group, Inc.; former candidate for Republican National Committee co-chairwoman
- Charles W. Anderson Jr. (1907–1960), first African-American legislator elected in Kentucky
- Eddie Andrews (born 1966), member of the Iowa House of Representatives (2021–present)
- John D. Anthony (born 1976), member of the Illinois House of Representatives from the 75th district (2013–2016)
- Caesar Antoine (1836–1921), 13th lieutenant governor of Louisiana
- Benjamin W. Arnett (1838–1906), elected to Ohio General Assembly 1885
- Alexander Asberry (1861–1903), member of the Texas House of Representatives

== B ==
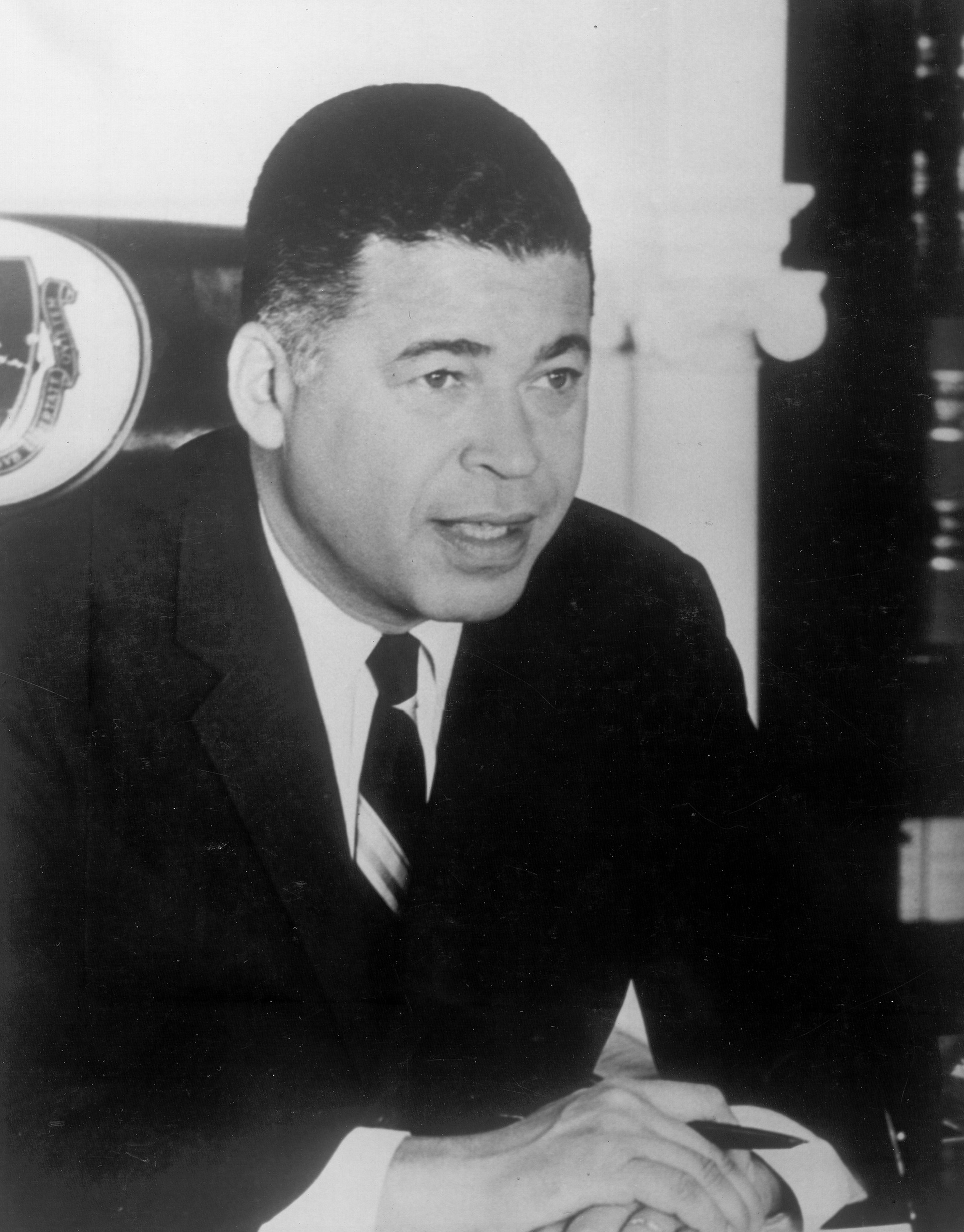
Edward Brooke was the first African-American popularly elected to the United States Senate. Hiram Revels was the first black U.S. senator; however, he was elected to office by a legislature.

- Pearl Bailey (1918–1990), singer, appointed "America's Ambassador of Love" by Richard Nixon
- Anna Simms Banks (1862–1923), first female delegate at the Kentucky's 7th congressional district Convention in Kentucky
- Laurence H. Banks (1897–1972), member of the Massachusetts House of Representatives (1947–1949) and Boston city council (1951–1952)
- Jose Celso Barbosa (1857–1921), medical doctor, sociologist, political leader, one of the first persons of black African descent to receive a medical doctor degree in the United States, founder of Republican Party of Puerto Rico
- Webster Barnaby (born 1959), member of the Florida House of Representatives
- Martin G. Barnes (1948–2012), mayor of Paterson, New Jersey
- Alfred S. Barnett (1858–1905), journalist, civil rights activist
- Ferdinand L. Barnett (1834–1932), member, Nebraska House of Representatives (1926–1928)
- Ferdinand Lee Barnett (1852–1936), journalist, lawyer, first African-American assistant state attorney
- Kathy Barnette (born 1971), Republican candidate for U.S. House of Representatives in Pennsylvania's 5th congressional district in 2020, and candidate for United States senator from Pennsylvania in 2022
- Andrea Barthwell (b. 1953/1954), former deputy director for Demand Reduction at the Office of National Drug Control Policy
- Tony Barton (born 1961), pastor, member of Kansas House of Representatives 2015–2017
- Houston A.P. Bassett (1857–1920), member of the Texas House of Representatives
- Thomas Beck (1819–?), member of the Texas House of Representatives
- Julius W. Becton Jr. (1926–2013), director of FEMA (1985–1989)
- Ashley Bell, national director of African American Engagement Office, director of the Small Business Administration's Southeast Region
- Loyeau Berhel, mayor of Baton Rouge, Louisiana (1871)
- Michelle Bernard (born 1963), journalist, author, columnist
- Walter Blackman, Arizona state representative
- J. Kenneth Blackwell (born 1948), former Ohio state treasurer and secretary of state; 2006 Republican candidate for governor of Ohio
- Donald Blakey (born 1936), member of the Delaware House of Representatives
- Edward David Bland (1848–1927), member of the Virginia House of Delegates
- Lynette Boggs (born 1963), Las Vegas City councilwoman; former Clark County, Nevada commissioner; former candidate for the U.S. House of Representatives
- Claude M. Bolton Jr. (1945–2015), United States Assistant Secretary of the Army for Acquisition, Logistics, and Technology (2002–2008)
- Mary Booze (1878–1955), RNC member from Mississippi
- Deneen Borelli (born 1969), conservative author, radio and television personality and columnist
- Harrison N. Bouey (1841–1909), elected probate judge, Edgefield County South Carolina in 1875, elected county sheriff in 1876, but was not allowed to take office
- Jesse Freeman Boulden (1820–1899), elected to Mississippi House of Representatives 1869
- Peter Boulware (born 1974), NFL linebacker and Republican candidate for the Florida House of Representatives, District 9.
- John W. Boyd (1852–1932), Member of the Tennessee House of Representatives
- Neal E. Boyd (1975–2018), opera singer and former candidate for the Missouri House of Representatives
- Darryl Boyer, Florida politician and conservative activist
- Jennette Bradley (born 1952), former treasurer of the State of Ohio
- Julian Bradley (born 1981), Wisconsin state senator
- Randy Brock (born 1943), state auditor of Vermont, state senator of Vermont
- Stephen Broden (born 1952), conservative commentator, Life Always board member (an anti-abortion organization) and evangelical pastor, 2010 congressional candidate
- Edward Brooke (1919–2015), U.S. senator from Massachusetts, first African-American elected by popular vote to the U.S. Senate
- Ada E. Brown – United States District Judge of the United States District Court for the Northern District of Texas
- Hallie Quinn Brown (1845–1949), educator, writer and activist
- Janice Rogers Brown (born 1949), U.S. Court of Appeals judge, California Supreme Court judge, and civil servant
- Jeremiah A. Brown (1841–1913), elected to Ohio House of Representatives 1885
- Reginald J. Brown (1940–2005), Assistant Secretary of the Army (Manpower and Reserve Affairs) (2001–2005)
- Solomon G. Brown (1829–1906), served in Washington, D.C. House of Delegates (1872–1874)
- Tony Brown (1933–2026), journalist, academic, businessman and commentator of the television show Tony Brown's Journal
- Yvonne Brown (1952–2012), first female black Republican mayor in Mississippi
- Blanche Bruce (1841–1898), U.S. senator from Mississippi, first African-American to serve a full term in the U.S. Senate
- C.L. Bryant (born 1956), Baptist minister, radio & television host
- J. Mark Burns (born 1979), pastor and candidate for U.S. House of Representatives in South Carolina
- Nannie Helen Burroughs (1878–1961), educator, activist and feminist
- Walter Moses Burton (1840–1913), member of the Texas State Senate
- William Owen Bush (1832–1907), member of the Washington State Legislature
- Keith Butler (b. 1955/1956), Republican national committeeman from Michigan, former councilman for Detroit, minister, and former U.S. senatorial candidate
- William F. Butler, politician, president of the Negro Republican Party, delegate to Republican National Convention in 1872

== C ==
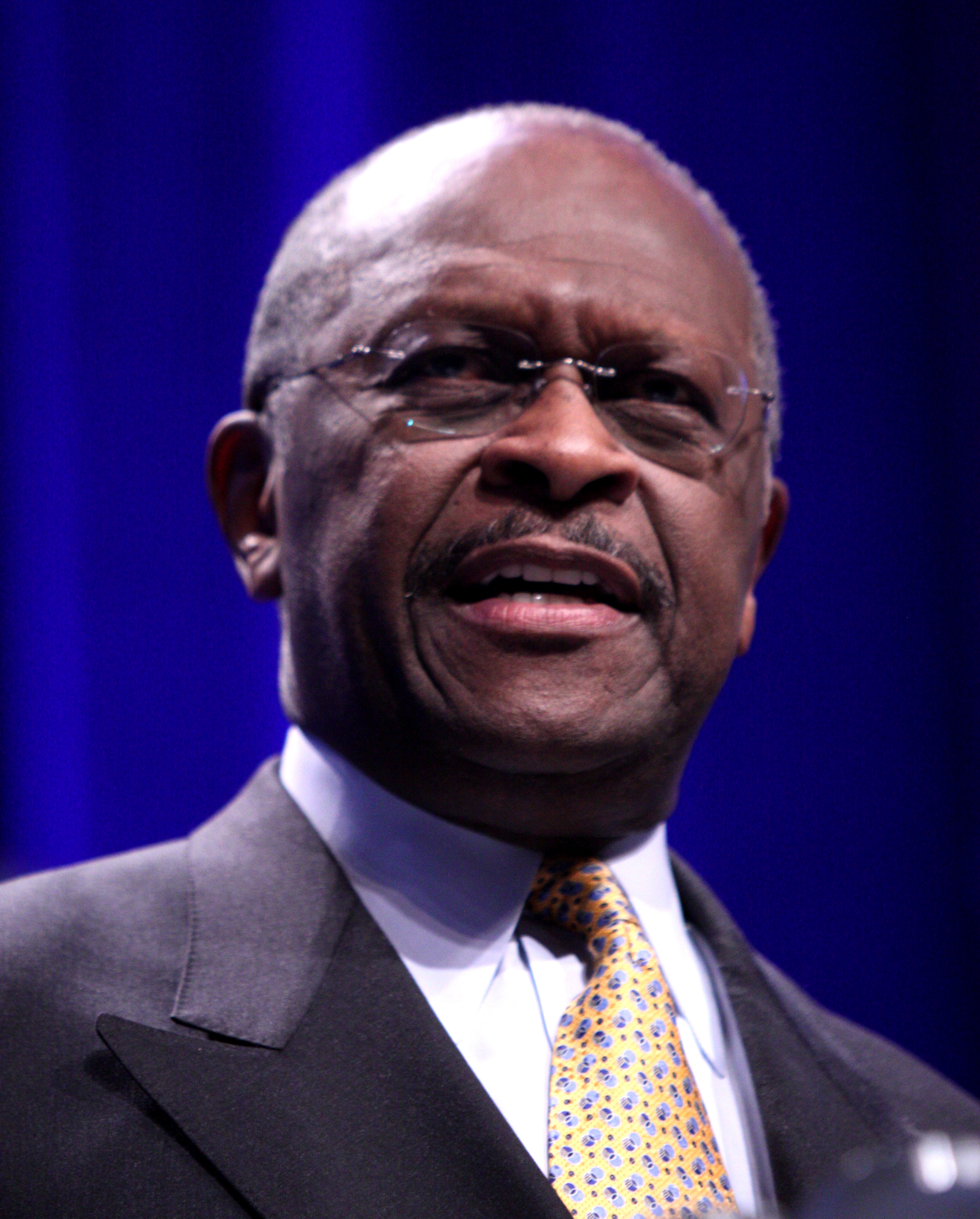
Herman Cain

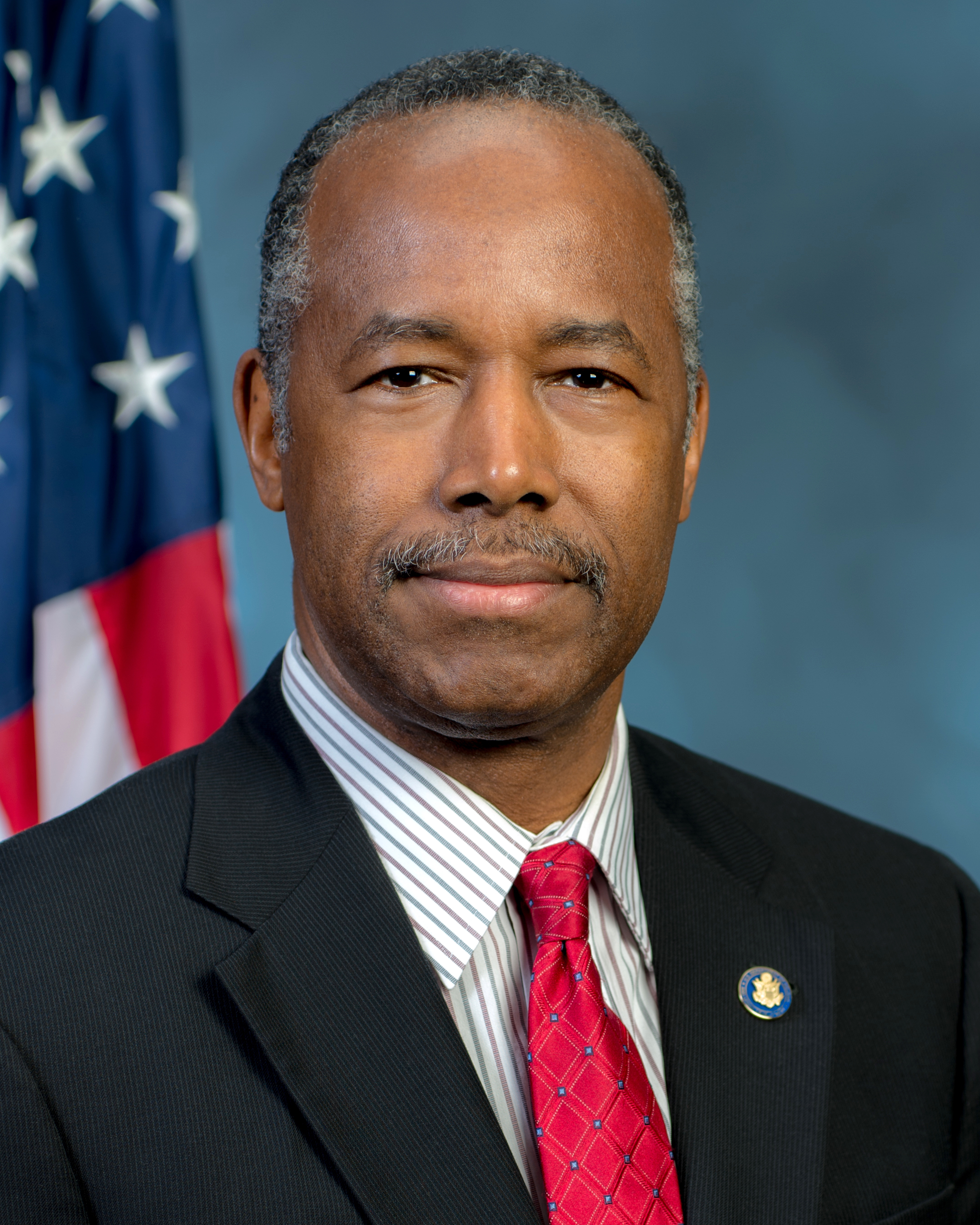
Ben Carson

- Herman Cain (1945–2020), businessman, media personality, and 2012 candidate for President of the United States
- Lawrence Cain (1844–1884), elected to South Carolina House of Representatives 1868 and to South Carolina Senate 1872
- Richard H. Cain (1825–1887), U.S. representative from South Carolina
- John H. Calhoun (1899–1988), member of the Atlanta City Council 1974–1978
- Daniel Cameron (born 1985), 51st attorney general of Kentucky
- Francis Lewis Cardozo (1836–1903), South Carolina treasurer and South Carolina secretary of state
- Archibald Carey Jr. (1908–1981), appointed by President Dwight D. Eisenhower as chair of his committee to reduce racial discrimination
- Selwyn Carrol (1928–2010), member of the Alaska House of Representatives 1973–1975, county auditor of Hampton County, South Carolina
- Jennifer Carroll (born 1959), lieutenant governor of Florida
- Ben Carson (born 1951), political commentator, pediatric neurosurgeon, 2016 presidential candidate, and Secretary of Housing and Urban Development under President Donald Trump (2017–2021)
- Eunice Carter (1899–1970), first African-American assistant district attorney in New York state; known for her role in prosecuting "Lucky" Luciano
- Stefani Carter (born 1978), member of the Texas House of Representatives
- Octavius Valentine Catto (1839–1871), civil rights activist and African-American baseball pioneer
- Josaphat Celestin (born 1956), mayor of North Miami, Florida (2001–2005)
- Wilt Chamberlain (1936–1999), basketball player, supported Richard Nixon for president in 1968 and 1972, accompanied Nixon to funeral of Martin Luther King Jr.
- Julius Caesar Chappelle (1852–1904), legislator (1883–1886), Massachusetts House of Representatives
- Juan Chastang (b. 1961/1962), Mobile County, Alabama commissioner
- Henry P. Cheatham (1857–1935), U.S. representative from North Carolina
- Ron Christie (born 1969), adviser to Vice President Dick Cheney
- Robert Church Jr. (1885–1952), founder, Lincoln League Memphis, Tennessee, eight times a delegate to the Republican National Convention
- Robert Reed Church (1839–1912), banker, 1900 delegate from Tennessee to the Republican National Convention
- Solomon T. Clanton (1857–1918), at-large delegate in 1892 from Louisiana to the Republican National Convention
- Eldridge Cleaver (1935–1998), author and civil rights leader
- Garry Cobb (born 1957), NFL linebacker, 2014 nominee for New Jersey 1st Congressional District
- Abram Colby (1800s), representative in the Georgia House of Representatives
- Harry A. Cole (1921–1999), first African-American elected to the Maryland Senate and serve on the Maryland Court of Appeals
- William Thaddeus Coleman Jr. (1920–2017), fourth United States Secretary of Transportation, first African-American Supreme Court Clerk
- Ward Connerly (born 1939), political activist, businessman, and former University of California regent
- Frank Cousins (born 1958), first African-American sheriff in Massachusetts
- Minnie M. Cox (1869–1933), first black postmaster in Mississippi
- Robyn Crittenden, Georgia Secretary of State and first African-American woman to serve as a statewide constitutional officer in Georgia
- Norris Wright Cuney (1846–1898), chairman of the Texas Republican Party (1886–1896)
- Green Currin (1842/1844–1918), member of the Oklahoma Territorial Legislature

== D ==
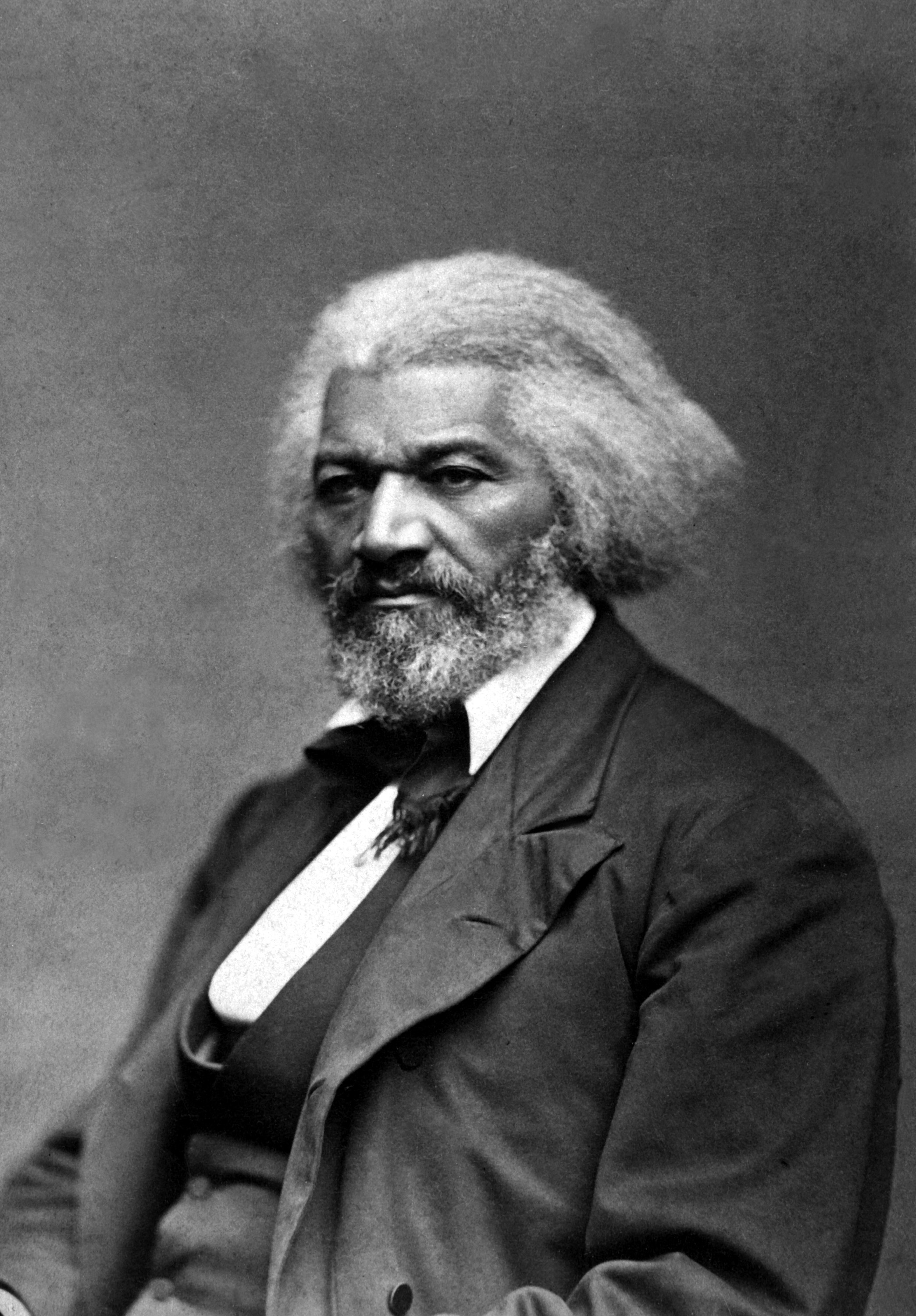
Frederick Douglass

- Randy Daniels (born 1950), secretary of state of New York, 2006 gubernatorial candidate
- Stacey Dash (b. 1966/1967), actress and former talk show host and candidate for California's 44th congressional district in the 2018 congressional election
- Artur Davis (born 1967), Democratic Alabama congressman, speaker at 2012 Republican National Convention, Republican (2012–2015)
- Ruth A. Davis (born 1943), diplomat and 24th director general of the United States Foreign Service
- Richard A. Dawson (1848–1906), served in the Arkansas State Senate (1873–1874); a Republican before 1900, and a Democrat afterwards
- William L. Dawson (1886–1970), served on the Chicago, Illinois City Council as a Republican (1933–1939); switched to Democrat in 1939 and was afterward elected to Congress as a Democrat
- John DeBerry (1951–present), Democratic Tennessee state representative (1995–2021), later switched to Republican party
- Robert De Large (1842–1874), South Carolina congressman
- Jessie De Priest (1870–1961), music teacher, wife of Congressman Oscar Stanton De Priest; her presence at a White House tea given by Lou Henry Hoover on June 12, 1929, caused a scandal among southern Democrats
- Oscar Stanton De Priest (1871–1951), U.S. representative from Illinois
- Timothy DeFoor (born 1961 or 1962), Pennsylvania Auditor General since 2021, first African-American elected to a statewide office in Pennsylvania
- Paris Dennard (born 1982), former White House aide to George W. Bush, CNN and NPR contributor
- William B. Derrick (1843–1913), clergyman, active in civil rights and Republican politics
- Lurita Doan (born 1958), former administrator of the United States General Services Administration
- Shamed Dogan (born 1978), Missouri state representative (2015–present)
- Byron Donalds (born 1978), Governor-elect of Florida and U.S. representative from Florida's 19th congressional district
- Frederick Douglass (1818–1895), abolitionist, editor, orator, author, and statesman
- Willie Dove (born 1945), Kansas state representative
- Antoine Dubuclet (1810–1887), state treasurer of Louisiana
- Damon Dunn (born 1976), former football player, politician
- Oscar Dunn (1826–1871), 11th lieutenant governor of Louisiana
- Edward Duplex (1831–1900), mayor of Wheatland, California (1888)
- Xaviaer DuRousseau (born 1997), conservative commentator and influencer

== E ==
- Brian Echevarria, North Carolina state representative
- Larry Elder (born 1952), talk radio host and commentator, candidate in the 2021 California gubernatorial recall election
- Robert Brown Elliott (1842–1884), U.S. representative from South Carolina
- Clark Ervin (born 1959), first Inspector General of the US Department of Homeland Security
- James Evans, chairman of the Utah Republican Party
- Melvin H. Evans (1917–1984), delegate to the U.S. House of Representatives from, and governor of, the U.S. Virgin Islands
- Charles Evers (1922–2020), civil rights leader, mayor of Fayette, Mississippi

== F ==
- Michel Faulkner (born 1957), pastor, defensive lineman for the New York Jets, 2010 nominee for New York's 15th congressional district
- Crystal Bird Fauset (1894–1965), first female African-American state legislator in the United States
- William A. Feilds (between c. 1846 and 1852–1898), member of the Tennessee House of Representatives
- William Webb Ferguson (1857–1910), first African-American man elected to the Michigan House of Representatives
- Ada Fisher (born 1947), Republican National Committee woman for North Carolina
- Arthur Fletcher (1924–2005), official in the administrations of Presidents Nixon, Ford, Reagan, and George H.W. Bush; considered the "father of affirmative action"
- James L. Flournoy (1915–2009), attorney and politician from California, 1970 nominee for California Secretary of State
- Timothy Thomas Fortune (1858–1928), orator, author, publisher, civil rights activist, Customs Inspector, Eastern District of Delaware (1874)
- Ezola Foster (1938–2018), teacher, political activist, 1986 Republican nominee for 48th District of the California Assembly; later ran for other offices on the tickets of other parties
- Gary Franks (born 1953), U.S. representative from Connecticut
- Jendayi Frazer (born 1961), former U.S. Assistant Secretary of State for African Affairs
- Ryan Frazier (born 1977), Aurora city councilman, 2010 nominee for Colorado's 7th congressional district
- Terrance Freeman (born 1975), member of the Florida House of Representatives (2026–present)
- Samuel B. Fuller (1905–1988), founder and president of the Fuller Products Company, publisher of the New York Age and Pittsburgh Courier, head of the South Side Chicago NAACP, president of the National Negro Business League, prominent black Republican
- Virginia Fuller, 2010 and 2012 congressional candidate
- Walt Furnace (born 1943), member of the Alaska House of Representatives 1983–1991

== G ==
- Matthew Gaines (1840–1900), community leader, minister, and Republican Texas state senator
- Wallace A. Gaines (1858–1940), businessperson, funeral director, elected official, and community leader in Covington, Kentucky
- James Garner, mayor of the Village of Hempstead, New York, 2004 congressional candidate
- Althea Garrison (born 1940), former member of the Massachusetts House of Representatives
- Robert A. George, editorial writer for the New York Post, blogger and pundit
- John Gibbs, HUD official in the Trump administration, candidate for Congress in Michigan
- Jonathan Clarkson Gibbs (1821–1874), Secretary of State of Florida and Florida Superintendent of Public Instruction
- Mifflin Wistar Gibbs (1823–1915), consul to Madagascar
- Richard Howell Gleaves (1819–1907), Lieutenant Governor of South Carolina
- James Golden, producer on the Rush Limbaugh radio talk show
- Walter A. Gordon (1894–1976), 18th governor of the United States Virgin Islands
- Elisha Winfield Green (c. 1815–1893), Baptist minister, elected vice president of Kentucky Negro Republican Party, 1867
- James Monroe Gregory (1849–1915), appointed to the board of trustees of the Washington, D.C. public schools in 1886, delegate to the 1892 Republican National Convention
- William Henry Grey (1829–1888), represented Phillips County, Arkansas at Arkansas Constitutional Convention in 1868; served in the Arkansas House of Representatives for Phillips County (1868–1869); elected to the Arkansas State Senate in 1875; served as clerk of the First Circuit Court and ex-officio Recorder of Deeds in 1870; in 1872, he became Arkansas Commissioner of Immigration and State Lands
- Rosey Grier (born 1932), former professional football player, Protestant minister, actor and former candidate for governor of California, 2018
- Archibald Grimké (1849–1930), lawyer, diplomat, and national vice president of the NAACP
- Elbert Guillory (born 1944), former state senator in Louisiana's 24th district

== H ==
- George W. Haley (1925–2015), attorney, diplomat, policy adviser, elected to Kansas State Senate 1964, former chief counsel, Federal Transit Administration, former general counsel, U.S. Information Agency, candidate for U.S. House of Representatives from Kansas in 1966, candidate for United States Senate from Maryland in 1986, ambassador to The Gambia
- Rodney Hall, member of the Mississippi House of Representatives
- Ken Hamblin (born 1940), radio host, political commentator, author, television personality
- A. C. Hamlin (1881–1912), member of the Oklahoma House of Representatives
- Jenean Hampton (born 1958), 57th lieutenant governor of Kentucky (2015–2019)
- Lionel Hampton (1908–2002), jazz musician, delegate to several Republican National Conventions, vice-chairman of New York Republican State Committee
- George C. Hanks Jr. – Justice on the Texas state First Court of Appeals (2010–2015) and Judge of the United States District Court for the Southern District of Texas (2015–present)
- Jeremiah Haralson (1846–1916), U.S. representative from Alabama
- Ineitha Hardaway (1971–2023), of Diamond and Silk, political commentator
- Bill Hardiman (born 1947), Michigan state senator, 2010 congressional candidate
- Greg Hardy (born 1988), mixed martial artist, former NFL defensive end
- Erika Harold (born 1980), 2003 Miss America, delegate to the 2004 Republican National Convention, 2012 Congressional candidate
- Sara J. Harper – Ohio Court of Appeals (1990–2003)
- Bruce Harris (born 1951), mayor of Chatham Borough, New Jersey
- James H. Harris (1828–1898), member of both the North Carolina House of Representatives and North Carolina Senate
- Paul Clinton Harris (born 1964), member of the Virginia House of Delegates
- Shevaun Harris, Secretary of the Florida Agency for Health Care Administration
- Lewis Hayden (1811–1889), elected to the Massachusetts State Legislature
- Henry E. Hayne (1840–?), former senator in the South Carolina Senate and Secretary of State of South Carolina
- Robert C. Henry (1921–1981), first African-American mayor in Ohio, mayor of Springfield, Ohio
- Tiffany Henyard (born 1983), mayor of Dolton, Illinois
- Danedri Herbert, chair of the Kansas Republican Party
- Arthur J. Hill (1948–1995), Assistant Secretary of Housing and Urban Development for Housing
- Curtis Hill (born 1961), 43rd attorney general of Indiana
- Mike Hill (born 1958), state representative in the Florida House of Representatives
- James Sidney Hinton (1834–1892), state representative in the Indiana House of Representatives
- Joseph H. Holland, commissioner of the New York State Department of Housing and Community Renewal
- William H. Holland (1841–1907), member of the Texas House of Representatives
- Harriet Holman, member of the South Carolina House of Representatives
- Amy Holmes (born 1973), political commentator and independent social conservative
- Jerome Holmes – United States Circuit Judge of the United States Court of Appeals for the Tenth Circuit
- Emile Honoré, Secretary of State of Louisiana
- Perry Howard (1835–1907), represented Holmes County, Mississippi in the Mississippi House of Representatives (1872–1875) and served on the county board of supervisors
- Perry Wilbon Howard (1877–1961), attorney from Mississippi and delegate to the RNC 1912–1960
- T. R. M. Howard (1908–1976), Mississippi civil rights leader, surgeon, entrepreneur and mentor to Medgar Evers and Fannie Lou Hamer
- Wesley Hunt (born 1981), U.S. representative from Texas
- Will Hurd (born 1977), U.S. representative from Texas, CIA analyst
- Zora Neale Hurston (1891–1960), folklorist, anthropologist, novelist, short story writer
- Lynn Hutchings (born 1960), member of the Wyoming House of Representatives
- John Adams Hyman (1840–1891), U.S. representative from North Carolina

== I ==
- Niger Innis (born 1968), commentator and activist

== J ==
- Alphonso Jackson (born 1945), 13th Secretary of Housing and Urban Development
- Alvin B. Jackson, former member of the Utah State Senate
- E.W. Jackson (born 1952), GOP nominee for lt. governor of Virginia in 2013, president of STAND and CETF, Marine Corps veteran, graduate of Harvard Law School
- Raynard Jackson, political consultant and political analyst for WUSA*9 TV (CBS affiliate) in Washington, DC
- Richard E. Jackson (born 1945), commissioner of the New York State Department of Motor Vehicles; first African-American mayor of a city in New York State
- Conrad James (born 1974), member of the New Mexico House of Representatives
- John E. James (born 1981), U.S. representative from Michigan and candidate for the U.S. Senate from Michigan in 2018 and 2020
- Kay Coles James (born 1949), director of the United States Office of Personnel Management 2001–2005, president of The Heritage Foundation (2018–2021), Virginia Secretary of the Commonwealth nominee
- Dr. Mildred Fay Jefferson (1927–2010), first African-American woman to graduate from Harvard Medical School; anti-abortion movement leader; Republican candidate for U.S. House and U.S. Senate
- Wallace B. Jefferson (born 1963), chief justice of the Supreme Court of Texas
- John Welden Jewett (1870–1905) teacher, community leader
- Edward A. Johnson (1860–1944), member of the New York State Assembly
- Eric Johnson (born 1975), mayor of Dallas since 2019 (switched from the Democratic Party in 2023)
- Fitz Johnson (born 1963), Georgia Public Service Commissioner
- Henry Lincoln Johnson (1870–1925), attorney and politician, head of the black-and-tan faction in Georgia
- James Weldon Johnson (1871–1944), first black manager of the NAACP, president of the Colored Republican Club
- Peter K. Jones (1834–1895), member of the Virginia House of Delegates
- Scipio Africanus Jones (1863–1943), Arkansas delegate to the Republican National Convention
- Shandy W. Jones (1816–1886), member of the Alabama House of Representatives (1868–1870)
- Vernon Jones (born 1960), member of the Georgia House of Representatives 1993–2001 and since 2017; originally a Democrat, he switched to Republican in January 2021

== K ==
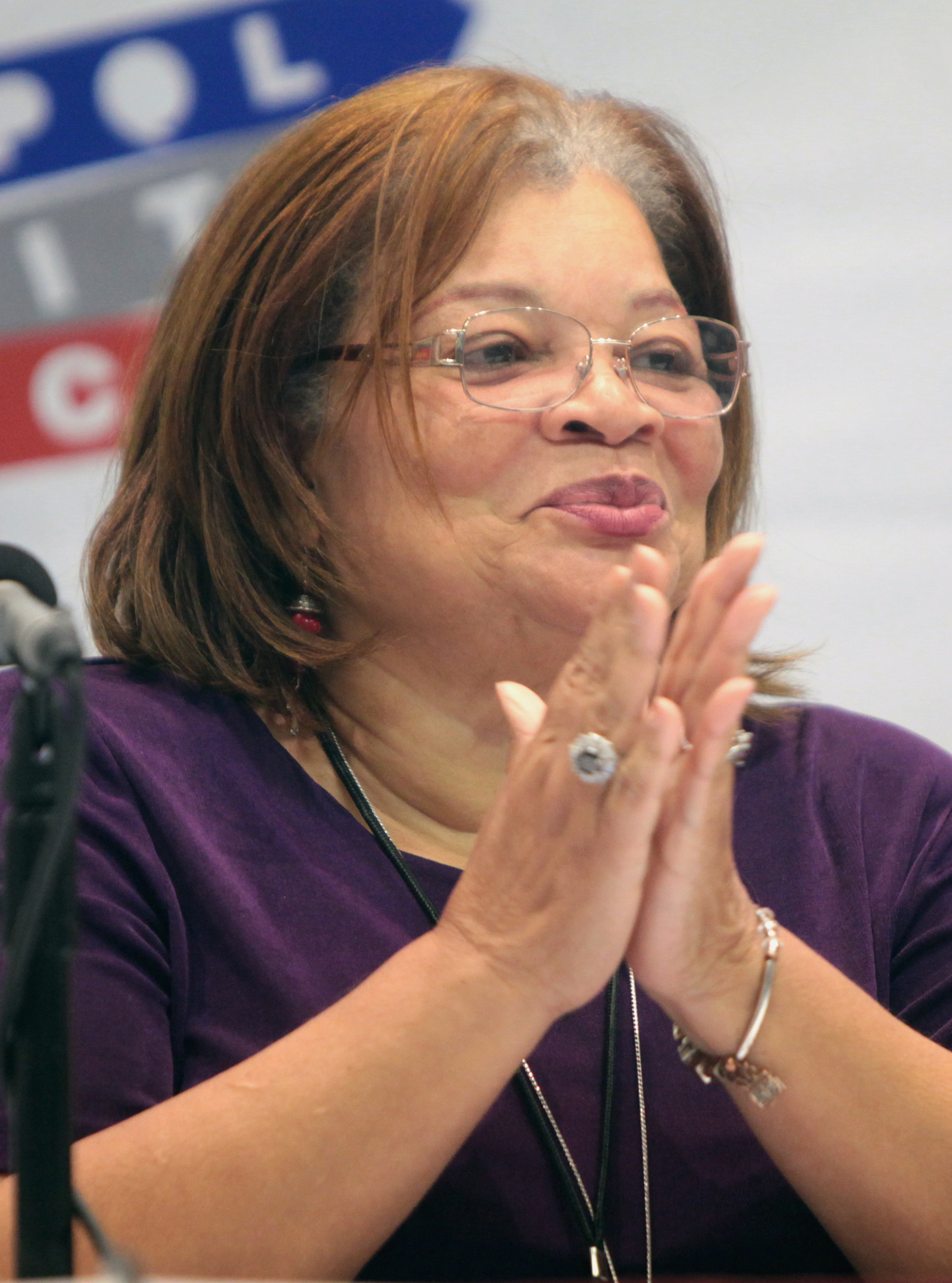
Alveda King, former member of the Georgia House of Representatives

- Kristina Karamo (born 1985 or 1986), nominee in the 2022 Michigan Secretary of State election and Chair of the Michigan Republican Party (2023–2024)
- Alan Keyes (born 1950), diplomat, media personality and nominee for the U.S. Senate in Maryland and Illinois
- Alveda King (born 1951), minister, political activist, author, niece of Martin Luther King Jr.
- Don King (born 1931), boxing promoter, attended 2009 Republican National Convention
- Mabel King (1932–1999), television and film actress
- Martin Luther King, Sr. (1899–1984), pastor, missionary, civil rights activist
- Kimberly Klacik (born 1982), former candidate for congress in Maryland's 7th district

== L ==
- Stephen N. Lackey (born 1980), public affairs advisor, social entrepreneur, fundraiser
- Joseph Ladapo (born 1978), Surgeon General of Florida
- Charles Henry Langston (1817–1890), Republican Presidential Elector from Kansas 1872 for Ulysses S. Grant
- John Mercer Langston (1829–1897), U.S. representative from Virginia's 4th congressional district (1890–1891)
- Harry LaRosiliere (born 1962), former mayor of Plano, Texas
- Jim Lawrence (born 1971), member of NH House of Representatives (2002–2008), 2014 candidate for 2nd NH Congressional District
- George Washington Lee (1894–1976), corporate executive, political and civic leader from Memphis
- Bruce LeVell, businessman, and executive director of National Diversity Coalition for Donald Trump's 2016 presidential campaign
- Bill Lewis – Judge of the United States District Court for the Middle District of Alabama (2025–present)
- William H. Lewis (1868–1949), United States Assistant Attorney General
- Jesse D. Locker (1891–1955), ambassador to Liberia, first African-American elected to the Cincinnati City Council
- George Logan (born 1969), former member of Connecticut State Senate
- W. H. Logan (born first half of 1850's), Arkansas justice of the peace, served in Arkansas State Senate, District 15 (1889–1890)
- Jefferson Franklin Long (1836–1901), U.S. representative from Georgia
- Z. Alexander Looby (1899–1972), Nashville lawyer, member of the Nashville City Council 1951–1971
- Nic Lott (born 1979), chairman for the Mississippi Young Republicans and Mississippi College Republicans
- C.N. Love (died 1946), journalist, active in the Black-and-Tan faction of the Republican Party in Houston, Texas
- Mia Love (1975–2025), U.S. representative for Utah's 4th congressional district (2015–2019)
- Samuel R. Lowery (1830–1900), lawyer
- John Roy Lynch (1847–1939), U.S. representative from Mississippi
- Ernest Lyon (1860–1938), Methodist clergyman, former United States ambassador to Liberia, and founder of the Maryland Industrial and Agricultural Institute for Colored Youths

== M ==
- Leo Mackay Jr. (born 1961), deputy secretary of the United States Department of Veterans Affairs
- Mesha Mainor (born 1975), member Georgia House of Representatives, District 56, Democrat until 2023, Republican since 2023
- Jon Maples (born 1982), member of the Florida House of Representatives (2026–present)
- Kenneth Mapp (born 1955), governor of the United States Virgin Islands (2015–2019) (elected as an independent)
- J. B. Martin (1885–1973), president of the Negro American League, owner of the Chicago American Giants
- James W. Mason (1841–1871), legislator from Arkansas
- Earl Matthews, General Counsel of the Department of Defense (2025–present)
- Lenny McAllister (born 1972), political analyst, community activist, television and radio host, author, 2013 Congressional candidate
- Edward P. McCabe (1850–1920), treasurer of Logan County, Oklahoma
- Glenn McCall (1954–2025), national committeeman, Republican National Committee, from South Carolina
- Richard Pollard McClain (1890–1965), member of the Cincinnati city council, 1935–1937, and state legislature
- William Madison McDonald (1866–1950), state chairman of the Republican Party of Texas
- Angela McGlowan (born 1970), political analyst and 2010 congressional candidate
- Harold Melton – Associate Justice of the Georgia Supreme Court (2005–2018) and Chief Justice of the Georgia Supreme Court (2018–2021)
- James Meredith (born 1933), civil rights leader
- Michael the Black Man (b. Maurice Woodside 1980), musician, operator of several websites, campaigned for President Trump holding a Blacks for Trump sign
- Kiyan Michael (born 1964), member of the Florida House of Representatives (2022–present)
- Leon P. Miller (1899–1980), first African-American judge in West Virginia
- Thomas Ezekiel Miller (1849–1938), U.S. representative from South Carolina
- Arthur Wergs Mitchell (1883–1968), active in Republican politics in Chicago, Illinois until 1932, when he switched to Democrat and represented Illinois In the United States House of Representatives (1935–1943)
- Charles Lewis Mitchell (1829–1912), member of the Massachusetts State Legislature (1866–1867)
- Jerry A. Moore Jr. (1918–2017), member of the District of Columbia City Council (1969–1975), member of the Council of the District of Columbia (1975–1985)
- Robert J. Moore (1844–?), member of the Texas House of Representatives
- Walthall M. Moore (1886–1960), first African-American to serve in the Missouri state legislature
- Clement G. Morgan (1859–1929), Boston attorney, civil rights activist, and city official
- E. Frederic Morrow (1909–1994), first African-American to hold an executive position at the White House; served under President Dwight D. Eisenhower as Administrative Officer for Special Projects, 1955–1961
- Eric Motley (born 1972), former deputy associate director, Office of Presidential Personnel in Bush Administration
- Deroy Murdock (born 1963), columnist
- George Washington Murray (1853–1926), U.S. representative from South Carolina

== N ==
- Charles E. Nash (1875–1877), U.S. representative from Louisiana
- Sophia A. Nelson (born 1967), lawyer, author, political commentator
- Constance Berry Newman (born 1935), U.S. diplomat; former Assistant Secretary of State for African Affairs; member of International Republican Institute
- Omarosa Manigault Newman (born 1974), assistant to President Donald Trump January 3, 2017 to January 20, 2018; Democrat prior to 2015, Republican 2015 to 2019, Independent since 2019
- William Nickerson Jr. (1879–1945), businessman, publisher, candidate for presidential elector on the Republican ticket of Dewey-Bricker in 1944
- LaToya Nkongolo (born 1978), member of the Maryland House of Delegates

== O ==
- James E. O'Hara (1844–1905), congressman from North Carolina
- Edwin R. Overall (1835–1902), abolitionist, civil rights activist, civil servant, politician, candidate for Nebraska Legislature 1880, 1882, 1890
- Burgess Owens (born 1951), U.S. congressman (Utah, district 4) and former NFL player
- Candace Owens (born 1989), political commentator
- Jesse Owens (1913–1980), athlete

== P ==
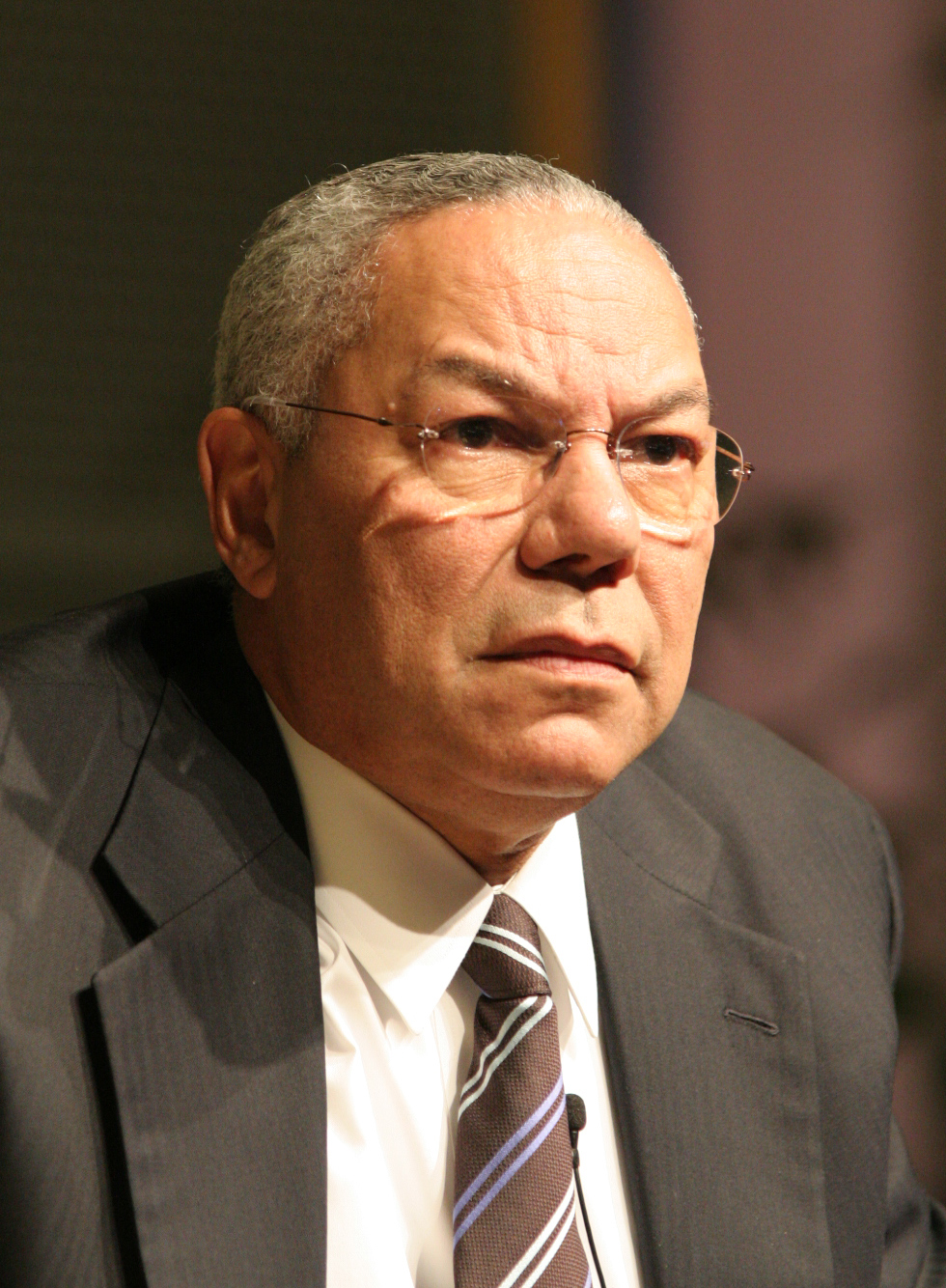
Colin Powell, 65th Secretary of State

- Rod Paige (1933–2025), seventh U.S. Secretary of Education
- Barrington D. Parker (1915–1993), judge of the District Court for the District of Columbia
- Sherman Parker (1971–2008), Missouri state representative, ran for U.S. House of Representatives
- Star Parker (born 1956), author, political commentator, 2010 Congressional candidate
- Kenneth Paschal (born 1966), member of the Alabama House of Representatives (2021–present)
- Lynne Patton (born 1972), deputy assistant to the president 2024–present, senior advisor to President Trump 2024 presidential campaign, regional director, Housing & Urban Development, 2016 RNC keynote speaker
- Charles Payne (born 1962), financial journalist
- Patrick Penn, member, Kansas House of Representatives, elected 2020, took office January 11, 2021
- Edward J. Perkins (1928–2020), first African-American U.S. ambassador to South Africa
- Jesse Lee Peterson (born 1949), civil rights activist and founder of Brotherhood of New Destiny
- Joseph C. Phillips (born 1962), actor, columnist and commentator
- Pio Pico (1801–1894), last governor of Mexican California, formed the Republican Party in California
- Samuel Pierce (1922–2000), Housing and Urban Development Secretary
- Katrina Pierson (born 1976), communications consultant, national spokesperson for Donald Trump's 2016 presidential campaign, senior advisor for 2020 re-election
- Mazi Melesa Pilip, Ethiopian-born American politician
- P. B. S. Pinchback (1837–1921), twenty-fourth governor of Louisiana; first African-American governor of a U.S. state
- Jane Powdrell-Culbert (born 1949), member of the New Mexico House of Representatives
- Colin Powell (1937–2021), 65th United States Secretary of State
- Michael Powell (born 1963), 24th chairman of the FCC
- Joe Profit (born 1949), former Atlanta Falcons player; candidate for U.S. House of Representatives in Georgia
- Pierre-Richard Prosper (born 1963), Bush Administration war crimes official

== R ==
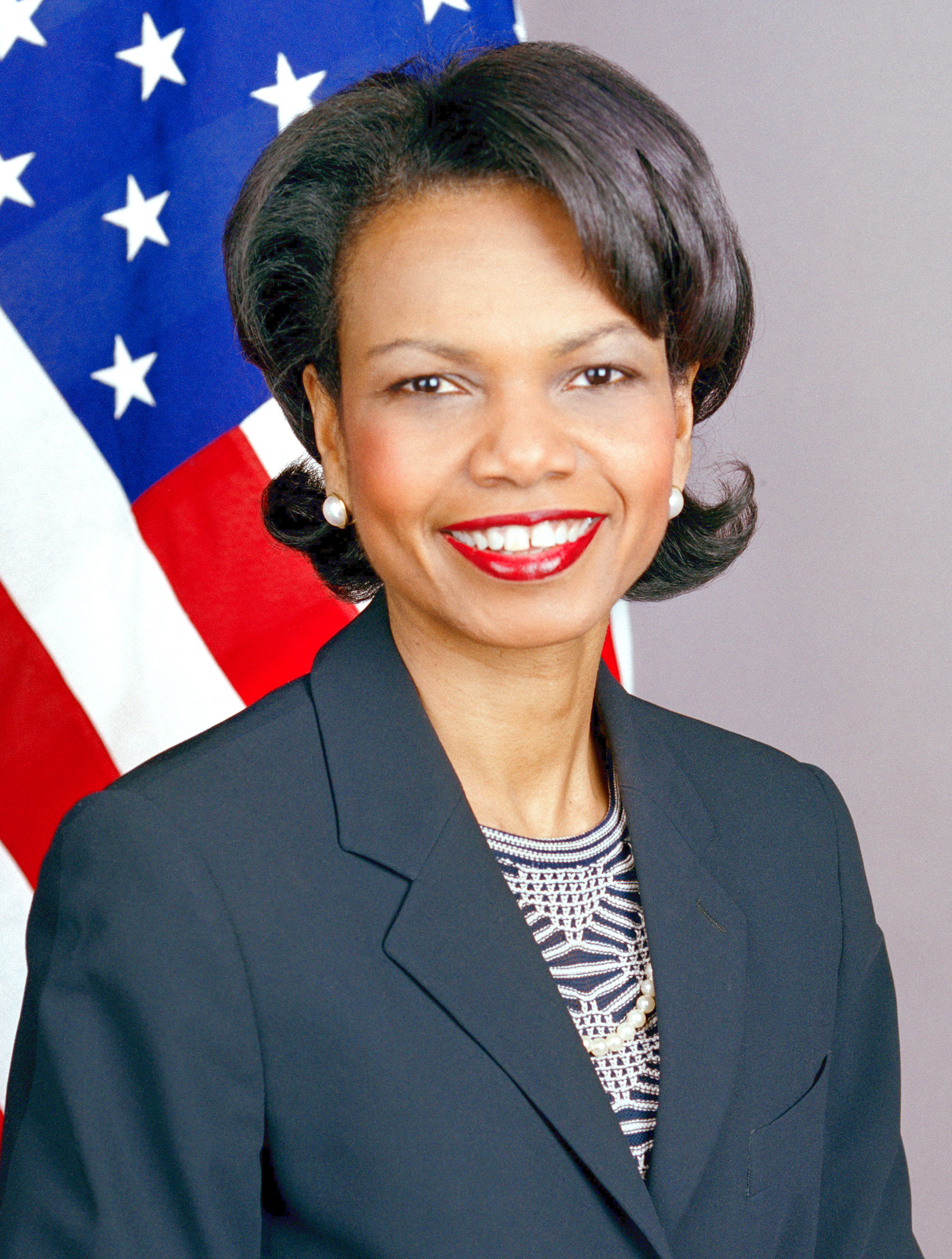
Condoleezza Rice, 66th Secretary of State

- Joseph H. Rainey (1832–1887), U.S. representative from South Carolina, first African-American to serve in the U.S. House of Representatives
- Benjamin F. Randolph (1820–1868), state senator in the South Carolina State Senate
- Oliver Randolph (1882–1951), second African-American elected to the New Jersey Legislature
- Tony Randolph (born 1966), member of the South Dakota House of Representatives, District 35
- Corrin Rankin (born 1974), Chairwoman of the California Republican Party since 2025
- Alonzo Jacob Ransier (1834–1882), U.S. representative from South Carolina and Lieutenant Governor of South Carolina
- James T. Rapier (1837–1883), U.S. representative from Alabama
- Mike Reichenbach (born 1971), South Carolina state senator since 2022 and 2026 lieutenant gubernatorial nominee
- Hiram Rhodes Revels (1827–1901), U.S. Senator from Mississippi, first African-American to serve in the U.S. Senate
- Condoleezza Rice (born 1954), 66th United States Secretary of State
- Herneitha Richardson, of Diamond and Silk, political commentator
- Matthew Ricketts (1858–1917), member of the Nebraska House of Representatives
- Adelbert H. Roberts (1860–1937), member of Illinois House of Representatives (1918–1922), member of Illinois Senate (1924–1934)
- Charles H. Roberts (1872–1967), first African-American to serve on the New York City Board of Aldermen
- Frederick Madison Roberts (1879–1952), first African-American in the California State Assembly
- Shack Roberts, elected to the State Legislature of Texas from the 5th District in 1873 and for two later terms, the last from the 10th District
- Jackie Robinson (1919–1972), baseball player (changed parties after Goldwater nomination)
- Mark Robinson (born 1968), lieutenant governor of North Carolina, 2021–2025
- Yolanda Hill Robinson (born 1968), Second Lady of North Carolina since 2021
- Angel Joy Chavis Rocker (1966–2003), guidance counselor, first female African-American candidate for the Republican nomination for president of the United States 2000
- Joe Rogers (1964–2013), lieutenant governor of Colorado, youngest lieutenant governor in state history
- Carson Ross (born 1946), mayor of Blue Springs, Missouri, former Missouri state rep
- Kevin A. Ross – Judge of the Los Angeles County Superior Court (1996–2005) and Judge on America's Court with Judge Ross (2010–present)
- George Thompson Ruby (1841–1882), member of the Texas State Senate
- George Lewis Ruffin (1834–1886), attorney, judge, Massachusetts state legislator, and Boston city councilman
- Boyd Rutherford (born 1957), lieutenant governor of Maryland, 2015–2023

== S ==
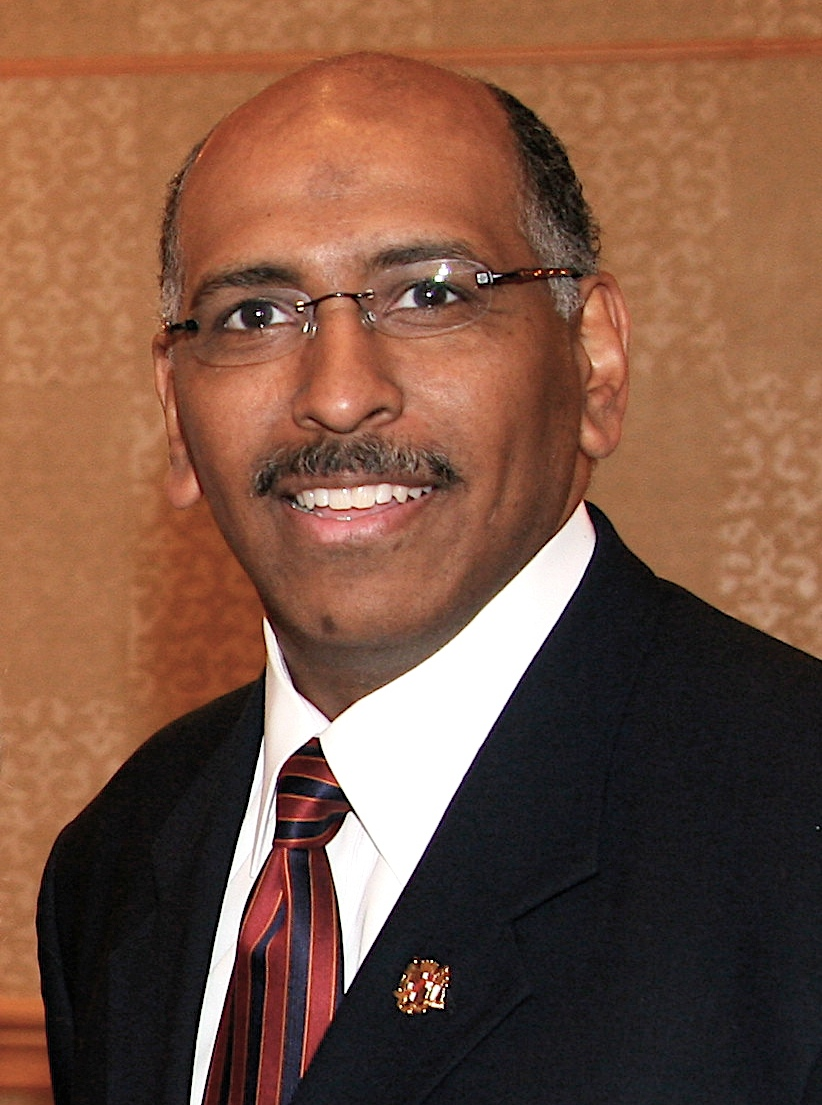
Michael Steele, 64th chairman of the Republican National Committee

- Cynthia Shepard Perry (1928–2024) U.S. Ambassador to Sierra Leone and Burundi
- Dwayne Sawyer (born 1966), state auditor of Indiana
- Darrell C. Scott, pastor, co-founder of National Diversity Coalition for Trump
- Emmett Jay Scott (1872–1957), educator, journalist, author, active in Republican politics, public relations adviser to every Republican National Convention, 1928–1948
- Marvin Scott (born 1944), congressional candidate
- Paul H. Scott (born 1982), Michigan state representative
- Tim Scott (born 1965), U.S. senator from South Carolina, first African-American senator to win election in the South since Reconstruction and former representative from South Carolina's 1st Congressional District
- Winsome Sears (born 1964), lieutenant governor of Virginia, member of the Virginia House of Delegates, 2004 congressional candidate
- Tara Setmayer (born 1975), former communications director for Republican Rep. Dana Rohrabacher in the U.S. House of Representatives (2006–2013) and current CNN political commentator (2014–present)
- Edwin Sexton (1923–1983), served in the Kansas State Senate (1964–1965)
- T. W. Shannon (born 1978), former speaker of the Oklahoma House of Representatives
- Roscoe Simmons (1881–1951), journalist, orator, and political activist
- Hercules Simons (born 1840s), member of South Carolina legislature during Reconstruction
- La'Ron Singletary, chief of the Rochester Police Department (2019–2020) and candidate for New York's 25th congressional district in 2022 (switched from the Democratic Party in 2021)
- John Andrew Singleton (1895–1970), member, Nebraska House of Representatives (1926–1928), afterward became a Democrat
- Millard F. Singleton (1859–1930), justice of the peace, 8th Ward, Omaha, Nebraska (1895), alternate delegate to Republican National Convention in 1892
- Kiron Skinner (born 1961), political scientist, Director of Policy Planning (2018–2019)
- Robert Smalls (1839–1915), U.S. representative from South Carolina
- John J. Smith (1820–1906), abolitionist and Massachusetts state representative
- Joshua I. Smith (born 1941), appointed commissioner of Minority Business Development by President George H. W. Bush
- Lavenski Smith – Judge of the United States Court of Appeals for the Eighth Circuit (2002–present)
- Robert Lloyd Smith (1861–1942), member of the Texas House of Representatives
- Thomas S. Smith (1917–2002), member of the New Jersey General Assembly
- Clay Smothers (1935–2004), member of the Texas House of Representatives
- John H. Smythe (1844–1908), United States ambassador to Liberia (1878–1881 and 1882–1885)
- DeForest "Buster" Soaries (born 1951), former New Jersey Secretary of State
- Angela Stanton-King (born 1977), Former congressional candidate in Georgia's 5th district
- Michael Steele (born 1958), political commentator, former Lieutenant Governor of Maryland, former candidate for the U.S. Senate in 2006 and former elected chairman of the Republican National Committee (2009–2010)
- Shelby Steele (born 1946), author
- James H. Stewart (1859–1924), member of the Texas House of Representatives
- McCants Stewart (1877–1919), lawyer
- Thomas Stith III (born 1963), member of the city council of Durham, North Carolina, 2004 candidate for lieutenant governor, 2007 mayoral candidate for Durham, North Carolina, chief of staff to Governor Pat McCrory
- Charles Stokes (1902–1996), member of the Washington House of Representatives
- Louis Wade Sullivan (born 1933), secretary of the U.S. Department of Health and Human Services
- Carol M. Swain (born 1954), author and professor at Vanderbilt University
- Lynn Swann (born 1952), NFL player and former Pennsylvania gubernatorial candidate

== T ==
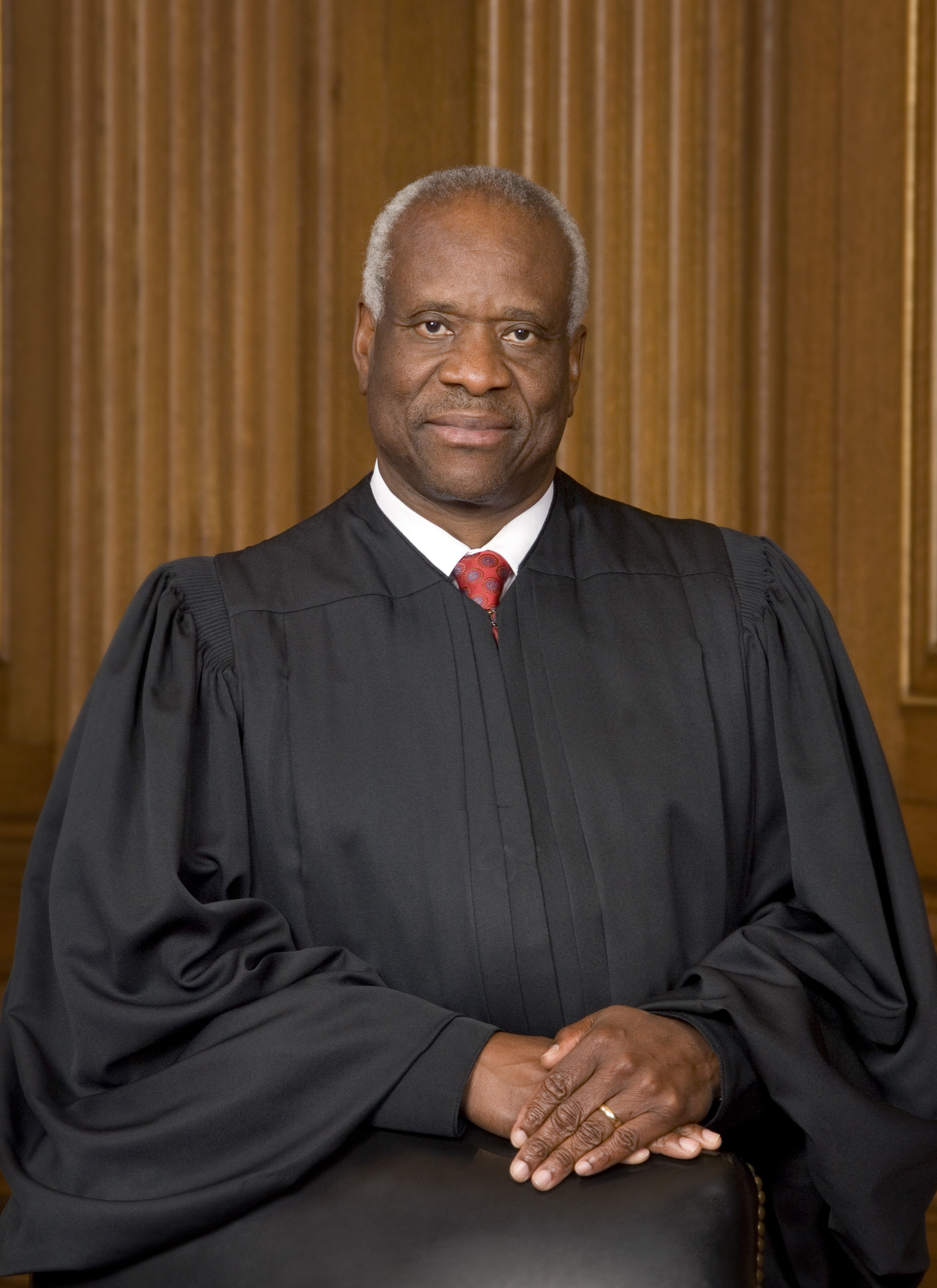
Clarence Thomas, Associate Supreme Court Justice

- Willie Talton, representative in the Georgia General Assembly
- Enrique Tarrio (b.1984 or 1985), Henry "Enrique" Tarrio, identifies as Afro-Cuban, candidate in 2020 Republican primary for Florida's 27th Congressional district, but withdrew, Florida state director of Latinos for Trump
- Noel C. Taylor (1924–1999), mayor of Roanoke, Virginia (1975–1992)
- Arthur Teele (1946–2005), assistant Secretary of Transportation
- Leo Terrell (born 1955), civil rights attorney and talk radio host
- Mary Church Terrell (1863–1954), member of District of Columbia Board of Education (1895–1906), president of the Women's Republican League during Warren G. Harding's 1920 presidential campaign; charter member of the NAACP
- Robert Heberton Terrell (1857–1925), appointed justice of the peace for Washington, D.C. in 1902; appointed to the Municipal Court of Washington, D.C. in 1911
- Brenda Thiam (born 1969), former member of the Maryland House of Delegates
- Clarence Thomas (born 1948), associate justice of the United States Supreme Court
- John W. E. Thomas (1847–1899), member, Illinois House of Representatives, 2nd District (1877–1879), 3rd District (1882–1886)
- Thurman Thomas (born 1966), Buffalo Bill, Republican activist, supported and campaigned for 2010 New York Republican gubernatorial nominee Carl Paladino
- Larry Thompson (born 1945), United States Deputy Attorney General
- Angela Tucker – Texas District Court Judge (2012–present)
- Benjamin S. Turner (1825–1894), Alabama congressman
- Scott Turner (born 1972), member of the Texas House of Representatives and United States Secretary of Housing and Urban Development

== U ==
- Sheryl Underwood (born 1963), comedian, actress, television host
- Jill Upson (born 1966), West Virginia House of Delegates
- James L. Usry (1922–2002), mayor of Atlantic City, New Jersey

== V ==
- Marcus Vaughn (born 1985), member of the Massachusetts House of Representatives
- William T. Vernon (1877–1941), Register of the Treasury under President Theodore Roosevelt
- Joy Villa (born 1986), singer, songwriter, actress, YouTuber, has expressed an interest in running for Congress as a Republican

== W ==
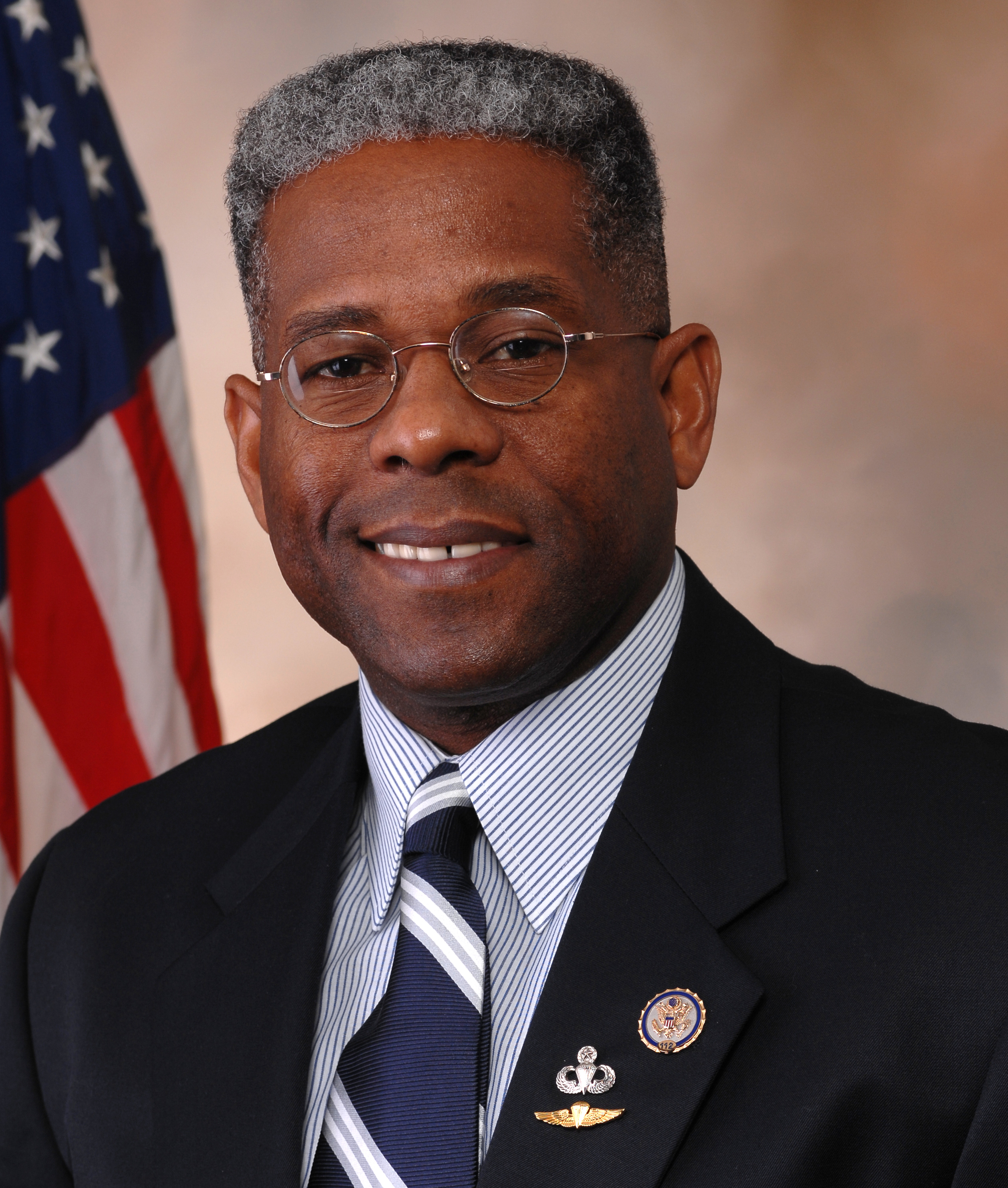
Allen West, former congressman from Florida's 22nd District

- Dale Wainwright (born 1961), former associate justice of the Texas Supreme Court
- Edward G. Walker (1830–1901), served as a Republican in the Massachusetts State Legislature (1866–1867), later joined the Democratic Party, and still later the Negro Party
- Herschel Walker (born 1962), football player, Republican nominee for United States Senate in Georgia in 2022, and United States Ambassador to the Bahamas
- George Wallace, Georgia state senator during the Reconstruction era, expelled on September 12, 1868, due to his race
- Josiah T. Walls (1842–1905), former U.S. representative from Florida, one of the first African-Americans to serve in the U.S. House
- Booker T. Washington (1856–1915), educator and activist
- Maurice Washington (born 1956), Nevada state senator
- J. C. Watts (born 1957), U.S. representative from Oklahoma
- Ida B. Wells (1862–1931), civil rights advocate and co-founder of the NAACP
- Allen West (born 1961), Texas Republican Party chairman and former U.S. representative from Florida
- John Francis Wheaton (1866–1922), former member of the Minnesota House of Representatives
- George Henry White (1852–1918), former U.S. representative from North Carolina
- James White (born 1964), current member of the Texas House of Representatives
- James T. White (1837–1892), member of the Arkansas House of Representatives and Arkansas Senate in the late 1860s
- Lisa Holder White – Justice of the Illinois Supreme Court (since 2022), Judge of the Illinois Fourth District Appellate Court (2013–2022), Trial Judge Illinois Sixth Judicial Circuit Court (2001–2013)
- Royce White (born 1991), basketball player and Republican nominee in the 2024 U.S. Senate election in Minnesota
- Ruben B. White, served in the Arkansas Senate (1873–1874)
- J. Ernest Wilkins Sr. (1894–1959), former Assistant Secretary of Labor under President Eisenhower
- Kurtis T. Wilder – Justice of the Michigan Supreme Court (2017–2018)
- Armstrong Williams (born 1962), radio and television commentator
- Benjamin Franklin Williams (1819–1886), member of the Texas House of Representatives
- David W. Williams – Judge of the United States District Court for the Central District of California (1969–2000)
- Michael L. Williams (born 1953), Texas Railroad Commissioner
- Josh Williams (born 1984), current member of the Ohio House of Representatives
- Q. V. Williamson (1918–1985), member of the Atlanta Board of Aldermen (1966–1981)
- Butler R. Wilson (1861–1939), Boston civil rights activist
- David S. Wilson (born 1981), member of the Alaska Senate (2017–2025)
- Hercules Wilson, member of the Georgia House of Representatives (1882–1885)
- Jackie Winters (1937–2019), member of the Oregon State Senate
- Jonathan Jasper Wright (1840–1885), state senator from South Carolina, first African-American state supreme court justice
- Stanley Wright (born 1985), Alaska State Assemblyman
- LaMetta Wynn (1933–2021), mayor of Clinton, Iowa (1995–2007)

== Y ==
- William F. Yardley (1844–1924), anti-segregation advocate, first African-American candidate for governor of Tennessee (1876)
- James H. Young (1860–1921), politician
- Robert P. Young Jr. – Justice of the Michigan Supreme Court (1999–2017) and Chief Justice of the Michigan Supreme Court (2011–2017)

== See also ==
- Black conservatism
- Hip Hop Republican
- Lists of African Americans
- National Black Republican Association
- Negro Republican Party
- Southern strategy
- List of American conservatives
- Black conservatism in the United States

== Works cited ==
- Anderson, Eric (1980). Race and Politics in North Carolina, 1872–1901: The Black Second. Baton Rouge: Louisiana State University Press. ISBN 9780807107843 – via Google Books.
