= List of Valdosta State University people =

The list of Valdosta State University people includes notable alumni, faculty affiliated with Valdosta State University, and famous athletes.

Members of each section are listed in alphabetical order.

== Notable alumni ==
=== Academia ===
- Donald Stoker, military historian
- Sonya T. Smith, mechanical engineer
- Terrence Leas, academic administrator

=== Arts, media, and entertainment ===
- 6lack, R&B singer, songwriter, and rapper
- Amanda Kozak, pageant titleholder from Warner Robins, Georgia who competed in Miss America and Miss USA pageants
- Brad Carter, actor and musician
- Debra Fordham, Emmy-nominated writer and producer for sitcom Scrubs and series Army Wives
- Josh Rouse, actor, known for playing Jerry Ford in movie, The Sim Racer
- Lisa Blount, actress, Oscar-winning producer
- Nancy Grace, worldwide CNN media personality, attended Valdosta State University, later received B.A. from Mercer University
- Pauley Perrette, actress, known for playing Abby Sciuto on TV series NCIS
- Ray McKinnon, actor and husband of Lisa Blount

=== Athletics ===
- Artie Ulmer, linebacker for the Atlanta Falcons and other teams of the NFL
- Antonio Edwards, ex-NFL defensive end for the Atlanta Falcons and others of the National Football League (NFL)
- Alvoid Mays, former NFL player who played at VSU
- Billy McShepard (born 1987), basketball player in the Israeli National League
- Briny Baird, professional golfer on PGA Tour and Nationwide Tour
- Chris Hatcher, football head coach, Samford University
- Dusty Bonner, two-time Harlon Hill Trophy winner and quarterback in the National Football League (NFL)
- Edmund Kugbila, ex-offensive lineman for the Carolina Panthers of the NFL
- Glacier, professional wrestler; most notably for his appearances in World Championship Wrestling (WCW)
- Jason Bulger, professional baseball pitcher for the Minnesota Twins of the MLB
- Jessie Tuggle, linebacker who played for the Atlanta Falcons his entire career from 1987 to 2000
- Kenny Moore II, American football player
- Larry Dean, linebacker for the Minnesota Vikings of the National Football League (NFL)
- Lawrence Virgil, defensive lineman for the New Orleans Saints of the NFL
- Maurice Leggett, defensive back for the Kansas City Chiefs of the NFL
- Richard Collier, former offensive tackle for the Jacksonville Jaguars of the National Football League (NFL)
- Ryan Schraeder, offensive lineman for the Atlanta Falcons of the NFL
- Seantavius Jones, wide receiver for the New Orleans Saints of the NFL

=== Business and industry ===
- Justin Lewis, software designer and entrepreneur, and one of the founders of NationalField, a software company that makes private social networks.

=== Government and law ===
- Amy Carter, Republican member of the Georgia House of Representatives, representing the 175th district since 2007.
- Ashley Bell, National Director of African American Engagement Office and the Director of the Small Business Administration's Southeast Region
- Philip A. Holloway, attorney and legal analyst
- Marc T. Treadwell, judge, United States District Court for the Middle District of Georgia.
- Patrick Faber, Belizean politician, currently the Minister of Education, Youth and Sports in Belize
- Tim Golden, Republican member of the Georgia State Senate, representing the 8th District since 1998.
- Vernon Keenan, director of the Georgia Bureau of Investigation (GBI), the state's primary investigation and law enforcement agency.

=== Religious figures ===
- Randy Brinson, Christian right activist and gastroenterologist from Montgomery, Alabama

== Notable faculty ==
=== Administration ===
- Ward B. Pafford, chairman of the English Department at Emory University from 1953 to 1958, Dean of the college at Valdosta State University from 1966 to 1971, and president of the University of West Georgia from 1971 to 1975.

=== Athletics ===
- Bret Campbell, current director of basketball operations at Murry State University and former head coach of UT-Martin.
- Chris Hatcher, former quarterback for Valdosta State (1991–1994) and current head football coach at Murray State University. Hatcher was the former head coach of Valdosta State University and Georgia Southern University
- Dana Holgorsen, quarterbacks, receivers and special teams coach at VSU (1993–95) and current head football coach of University of Houston
- David Dean, current head football coach of UWG; won the NCAA Division II Football Championship in 2007 (his first year as coach), and 2012 with Valdosta State, and had a short-lived stint as co-offensive coordinator at Georgia Southern.
- Guy Morriss, offensive line coach at VSU (1992–1993) and current head coach of the Texas A&M–Commerce Lions football team
- Hal Mumme, VSU head football coach from 1992 to 1996, and current the offensive coordinator at Southern Methodist University.
- Kirby Smart, former VSU defensive coordinator and current Head Football Coach for the University of Georgia
- Matt Dunigan, former offensive coordinator at VSU and ex-CFL player and current TSN sports commentator
- Mike Cavan, American football coach who served as the head coach at Valdosta State University (1986–1991), East Tennessee State University (1992–1996), and Southern Methodist University (1997–2001)
- Mike Leach, offensive coordinator at VSU (1992–1996), former head coach of the Texas Tech Red Raiders football team, Washington State Cougars football team, and Mississippi State Bulldogs football team until his death in 2022.
- Tommy Thomas, former head coach of the VSU baseball team from 1967 to 2007, and the first and only Division II coach to reach 1,200 wins
- Will Muschamp, defensive coordinator for VSU football in 2000; former head coach of the Florida Gators football team of the University of Florida.
