= Ryland Randolph =

American politician

Ryland Randolph (1835 – April 5, 1903) was a newspaper publisher, Ku Klux Klan leader, and state legislator who lived in Tuscaloosa, Alabama. He used his newspaper, the Independent Monitor, to lambast Republicans during the Reconstruction era as carpetbaggers, scalawags, and freed blacks, and attacked fellow legislator Shandy Jones and others with a cartoon of them being lynched. Jones retreated from Tuscaloosa in 1869 due to threats against him from Klansmen including Randolph and settled in Mobile. According to the first paragraph of Gladys Ward's 1932 masters thesis at the University of Alabama in Tuscaloosa, no one was truer to the white man's cause than Randolph and he was idolized by many.

Randolph was born in 1835 to a slave-owning family in Culpeper County, Virginia. During the American Civil War, he fought as a cavalryman in the Confederate States Army.

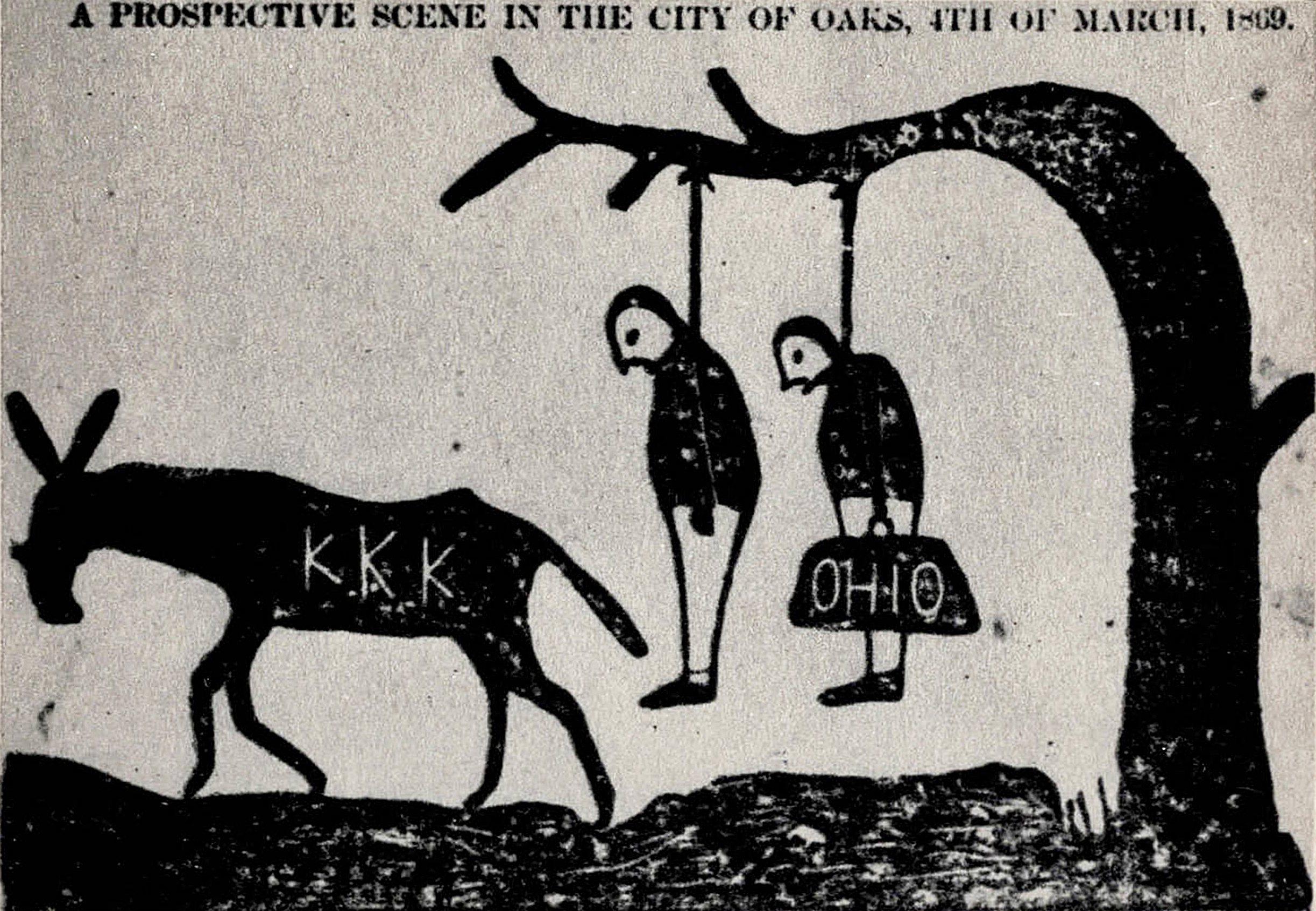
Cartoon drawn by Randolph calling for the Ku Klux Klan to lynch carpetbaggers and scalawags.

Randolph won a seat in the Alabama House of Representatives after one of Tuscaloosa's two representatives in the house was murdered by the Klan. A cartoon which he published of two Republican politicians being lynched from the branch of a tree was reprinted in Republican papers in Ohio to expose Democratic brutality.

The Montgomery Mail reported in March 1868, Randolph was arrested by federal authorities after stabbing Balus Eddins, an African American man. He was tried by a military court for assault with intent to commit murder, but was acquitted. In 1869, he led a lynch mob that killed a black man.

On the morning of April 1, 1870, Randolph was severely wounded, and an elderly bystander killed, in a confrontation with a University of Alabama cadet over politics. Randolph's breast pocket wallet blocked the cadet's shot, sparing him from a potentially fatal injury. The cadet fled, with Randolph giving chase and emptying his revolver in an unsuccessful attempt to kill the student. Randolph thereupon threw the empty revolver at him when he took shelter in a nearby store. When Randolph burst in after him, the cadet fired one last shot at him, striking him just above the knee. Randolph continued to give chase, but soon passed out from blood loss. Gangrene set into his leg, which resulted in it having to be amputated. For the rest of his life, Randolph suffered from neuralgia, as well as irregular bouts of morphine addiction. He also had to walk with a cane and crutch for the rest of his life.

Randolph eventually moved to Birmingham. He served as an editor of The Independent Monitor and was also its publisher for a time. G. Ward Hubbs wrote about the infamous lynching cartoon in his book Searching for Freedom after the Civil War: Klansman, Carpetbagger, Scalawag, and Freedman. In the spring of 1903, Randolph, now 67, boarded a trolley in Birmingham set for his home. However, the trolley moved suddenly, resulting in him suffering fatal injuries. Ward described the incident in the biography.

"The car started with a jerk, and he was thrown backward full length. His head struck the iron plate which covered the door sill, and he was knocked unconscious. He never recovered his strength, and he died April 5, 1903."
