= John Gorman Barr =

American humorist

John Gorman Barr (1832 - 1858) was an American lawyer, political candidate, and humorist in Alabama. A collection of his stories was published in the 1981 book Rowdy Tales from Early Alabama: The Humor of John Gorman Barr edited by G. Ward Hubbs.

== Early life and eduation ==
Barr was born in Milton, North Carolina to Thomas Barr and Mary Jane Gorman Barr, Scottish immigrants. The family moved to Raleigh, North Carolina and then Tuscaloosa, after his father's death in 1826.

Barr apprenticed in a printing office and then studied at the University of Alabama, graduating in 1841 and receiving a master's in 1842.

== Career ==
Barr became a lawyer, organized a unit during the Mexican-American War, and became the editor of the Tuscaloosa Observer. He was appointed a consular official in Australia but died en route after touring Europe.
