= Stephen N. Lackey =

American hedge fund manager, public affairs advisor, and political fundraiser

- Born: January 22, 1980 (age 46); Atlanta, Georgia
- Occupations: Public Affairs Advisor, Hedge Fund Manager, Fundraiser
- Political party: Independent

Stephen N. Lackey (born January 22, 1980) is an American hedge fund manager, philanthropist and political fundraiser lauded for creating opportunities for large corporations and private donors to filter financial support into their communities. Lackey is the founder and head of Vival Capital Management, a hedge fund with more than $1 billion in assets, and The Stephen Lackey Trust, a think tank which works as a clearinghouse of ideas to solve global problems. He is most noted as a campaign bundler for the Republican Party.

== Public Affairs ==
Lackey has provided nonprofit development and public affairs support to a number of organizations, and most notably worked as one of the youngest fundraising and development professionals for a major nonprofit in the state of Tennessee. He is also the organizer of TEDxSweetAuburn held in Atlanta, Georgia.

== Philanthropy ==
Lackey has given more than $10 million to public charities and foundations, with a focus on children's healthcare. In 2010 Lackey consolidated his many giving programs into the Adults Getting Educated (AGE) nonprofit. The organization administers the 'Coming of AGE Scholarship' which supports college students in four states who have earned the GED credential.

== Political Fundraising ==
Lackey began quietly forming partnerships between African-American donors (mostly black pastors) and conservative candidates during the second Bush campaign, eventually moving back to Atlanta to develop strategies and programs to connect black conservatives. In 2011 he went public with this work, becoming a pundit and strategist for the conservative agenda. In 2012, BET News named Stephen N. Lackey in their annual 'Republicans to Watch' photo list. He planned and hosted the Quarles & Brady, LLP sponsored Republican Visions Luncheon, the largest African-American Conservative event at the 2012 GOP Convention in Tampa, FL.

Lackey recently gained national attention for interviews with The Huffington Post - The Black Republican Dilemma , NewsOne - Being Black and Republican in the Obama Era and BET - GOP Forms Future Majority Caucus.

== See also ==
- List of African-American Republicans
