= Mildred Fay Jefferson =

American physician (1927–2010)

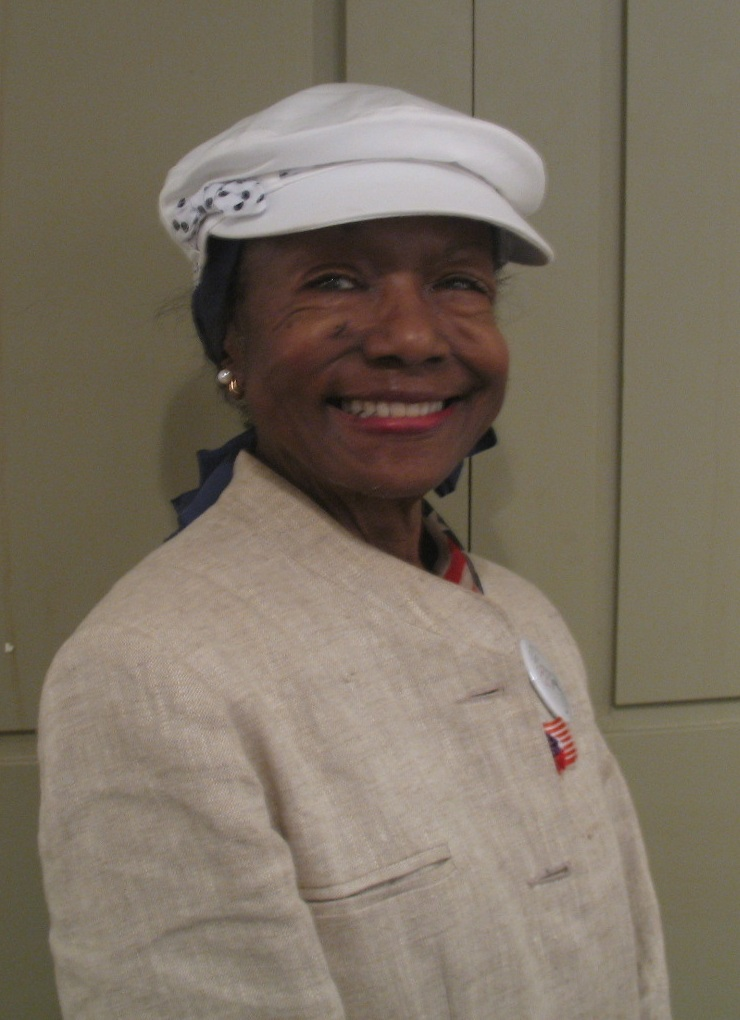
- Born: April 6, 1927; Pittsburg, Texas, U.S.
- Died: October 15, 2010 (aged 83); Cambridge, Massachusetts, U.S.
- Education: Texas College (BS); Tufts University (MS); Harvard University (MD)
- Political party: Republican

Mildred Fay Jefferson (April 6, 1927 – October 15, 2010) was an American physician and anti-abortion activist. The first black woman to graduate from Harvard Medical School, the first woman to graduate in surgery from Harvard Medical School, and the first woman to become a member of the Boston Surgical Society, she is known for her opposition to the legalization of abortion and her work as president of the National Right to Life Committee.

== Personal life ==
Born in Pittsburg, Texas, Jefferson was the only child of Millard and Guthrie Jefferson, a Methodist minister, and a school teacher. Her parents divorced before 1976 and lived in Roxbury after their divorce. Jefferson was raised in Carthage, Texas, in the Wesley-Calvinist tradition. At a young age, "Millie" followed the town doctor around on his horse drawn buggy while he made housecalls, this would later inspire her to become a doctor.

Jefferson married in 1963 to Shane Cunningham, whom she met on a skiing trip, a real estate manager. As of 1976, the couple lived in Back Bay and had no children.

== Education ==
For elementary and middle school she attended public schools in East Texas. Later she earned her bachelor's degree a bachelor’s degree summa cum laude and in three years from Texas College. Since she was considered too young to attend medical school, she went to Tufts University where she received her master's degree in biology. She then went on to Harvard Medical School and graduated in 1951, becoming the first black woman to do so.

=== Harvard Medical School ===
Mildred Fay Jefferson was the first African American woman to graduate from Harvard Medical School in 1951. Her interests focused on medical jurisprudence, medical ethics, and particularly the societal and public policy impacts of combining medicine and law. She shifted to surgery during her first few years at Harvard Medical School and began clinical studies, and learned operational and surgical techniques. Two of her mentors—Dr. Carl Walter (the head of the surgical department) and Dr. David Hume (one of her professors, and the chief resident at the time)—gave her opportunities to put in extra time to advance her surgical skillset. Being the hard worker she was, she used these extra hours to get ahead, and by the time she obtained an internship, her skillset was well prepared.

During Dr. Jefferson's third and fourth years at Harvard Medical School, she took a variety of courses including an elective in urology "because most people think that a woman doctor would not be strong in urology."

== Career ==
Jefferson achieved board certification in surgery in 1972. After graduating from medical school, she did a surgical internship at Boston City Hospital, becoming the first woman to do so. She was also the first female doctor at the former Boston University Medical Center. By 1984, Jefferson was a general surgeon at the center and a professor of surgery at the Boston University School of Medicine. She would later become the first woman to become a member of the Boston Surgical Society.

=== Right-to-life activism ===
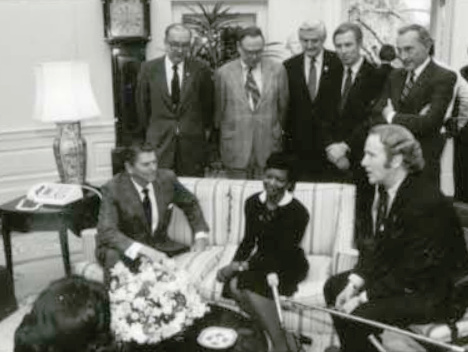
Mildred Jefferson meeting with Ronald Reagan, 1981

According to Jefferson, one root of her opposition to abortion was her dedication to the Hippocratic oath, which morally bound her to the preservation of life. Her interest in abortion issues was triggered when she was asked to sign a petition opposing a resolution proposed by the American Medical Association supporting liberalization of abortion-related laws.

Her activism began in 1970, with a role in the board of governors on The Value of Life Committee (VOLCOM). In 1972, she left her role on VOLCOM to found the Massachusetts Citizens for Life (MCFL) and also helped found the National Right to Life Committee (NRLC). She became the vice president of the National Right to Life Committee in 1973 and then was elected as chairman of the board the following year. Dr. Jefferson then was elected as president of NRLC, serving three terms from 1975 to 1978. She played a key role in all of these organizations by emphasizing the importance of preserving human life from conception to death. Jefferson concurrently wrote a column, "Lifelines", in the National Right to Life News publication.

She served on the boards of more than 30 groups opposing abortion, euthanasia, human cloning, and embryonic stem cell research. Within the black community Jefferson advocated for the pro-life cause by becoming a member of Black Americans for Life.

In 1975, Jefferson was the first witness for the prosecution in the manslaughter case levied against Kenneth Edelin for his performance of a legal abortion.

It was in 1980 that Jefferson helped the National Right to Life Committee start a political action committee because she believed it was important to lobby and support anti-abortion candidates for office. While a Republican, she helped Democrat Ellen McCormack run for the Democratic Party presidential nomination in 1976. Apart from NRLC, Jefferson served on boards of directors of more than 30 anti-abortion organizations.

Jefferson is also noted for changing Ronald Reagan's stance on abortion from pro-choice to anti-abortion. He wrote to her in a letter, "I wish I could have heard your views before our legislation was passed. You made it irrefutably clear that an abortion is the taking of human life. I’m grateful to you."

During her career in the pro-life movement, she was called anything ranging from a political opportunist to "dangerous," "anti-medicine," and "publicity hungry." She had strong opinions when it came to topics such as abortion and was not afraid to voice them during speeches, rallies, and meetings for a variety of organizations.

In recognition of her efforts in medicine and pursuit of social justice during her life, she has received 28 honorary degrees from universities and colleges. Although her career was largely successful, especially for her time, she couldn't pursue her career as a surgeon because of her identity as a woman of color and faced persistent discrimination. This led her to shift into the sphere of politics and make a lasting change through pro-life interest groups through the end of her life.

=== Political activities and positions ===
In her commitment to the right-to-life movement, she campaigned for anti-abortion candidates at the local, state, and national levels. Jefferson supported the single-issue, anti-abortion 1976 campaign of Ellen McCormack for president and appeared in television advertisements for McCormack.

Jefferson was a self-described "Lincoln Republican" and served on the 1980 Massachusetts Reagan for President Campaign. Jefferson had first met Reagan in 1973 while he was governor of California. She also unsuccessfully sought the Republican nomination for the 1982, 1990, and 1994 U.S. Senate elections. Although unsuccessful in all of these attempts, she continued to garner widespread fame and recognition nationally and internationally.

Though at first, she appeared to be a single-issue candidate at the head of the pro-life movement, as her role in politics expanded, she spoke out against a variety of topics including busing, social welfare programs, capital punishment, and the Equal Rights Amendment (ERA). She held conservative political and social values, opposing the Equal Rights Amendment on the basis that it is unnecessary as the Constitution has no in-built inequity. She for years called for a constitutional amendment to reverse the 1973 Supreme Court decision in Roe v. Wade, rejecting the notion that abortion is a private matter between a woman and her physician. Jefferson also expressed opposition to welfare and busing, and support for the death penalty.

== Later years ==
Jefferson died in her Cambridge home on October 15, 2010, at the age of 83 years. She was divorced and had no children. She was buried in her hometown of Carthage, Texas.

== See also ==
- Black conservatism in the United States
- List of African-American Republicans
