= George Washington Dupee =

American Baptist leader and former slave

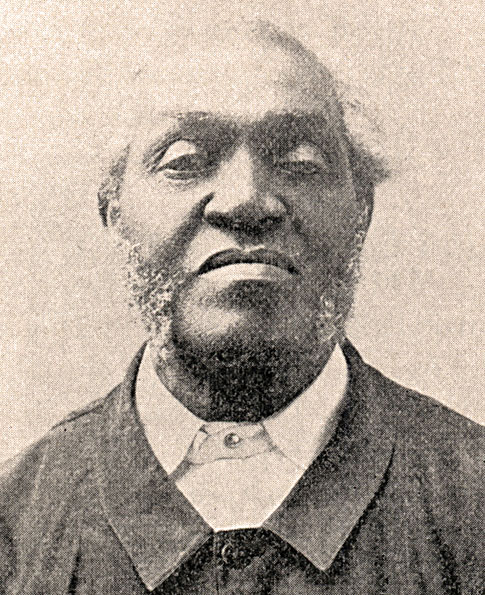
- George Washington Dupee
- Born: July 24, 1826
- Died: 1897 (aged 70–71)
- Occupation: Baptist leader
- Writing career
- Language: English

Religious life
- Religion: Baptist

George Washington Dupee (July 24, 1826 – 1897) was a former slave who became a Baptist leader in Kentucky, United States.

== Early years ==
Dupee was born in Gallatin County, Kentucky on 24 July 1826, son of Cuthbert and Rachael Dupee. His first owner was Elder Joseph Taylor, a Baptist preacher. After Taylor moved to Illinois, Dupee became a hired slave, working in a rope and bagging factory, and in a brickyard. In 1841 while he was working on the courthouse in Versailles he came under the influence of Father David Woods, a Baptist preacher, and he was converted in August 1842.

== Preacher ==
Dupee began attending meetings at the house of a white deacon, and was encouraged to improve his reading and writing and to become a preacher by Sister Phoebe Fields, a black woman. White church members voted to license him as a preacher in 1847. He was ordained as a minister in 1851. In 1853 he organized a church at the Old Big Spring, Woodford county, and in 1855 he organized a church in Paris, Kentucky. He became pastor of the Pleasant Green church in Lexington, dividing his time between this church and his church in Georgetown.

His congregation in Lexington purchased his freedom in 1856, when he was sold at an auction at the Scott Country courthouse. He became the first black pastor of the Georgetown Baptist Church, renamed the First African Baptist Church after the American Civil War (1861–1865).

== Baptist leader ==
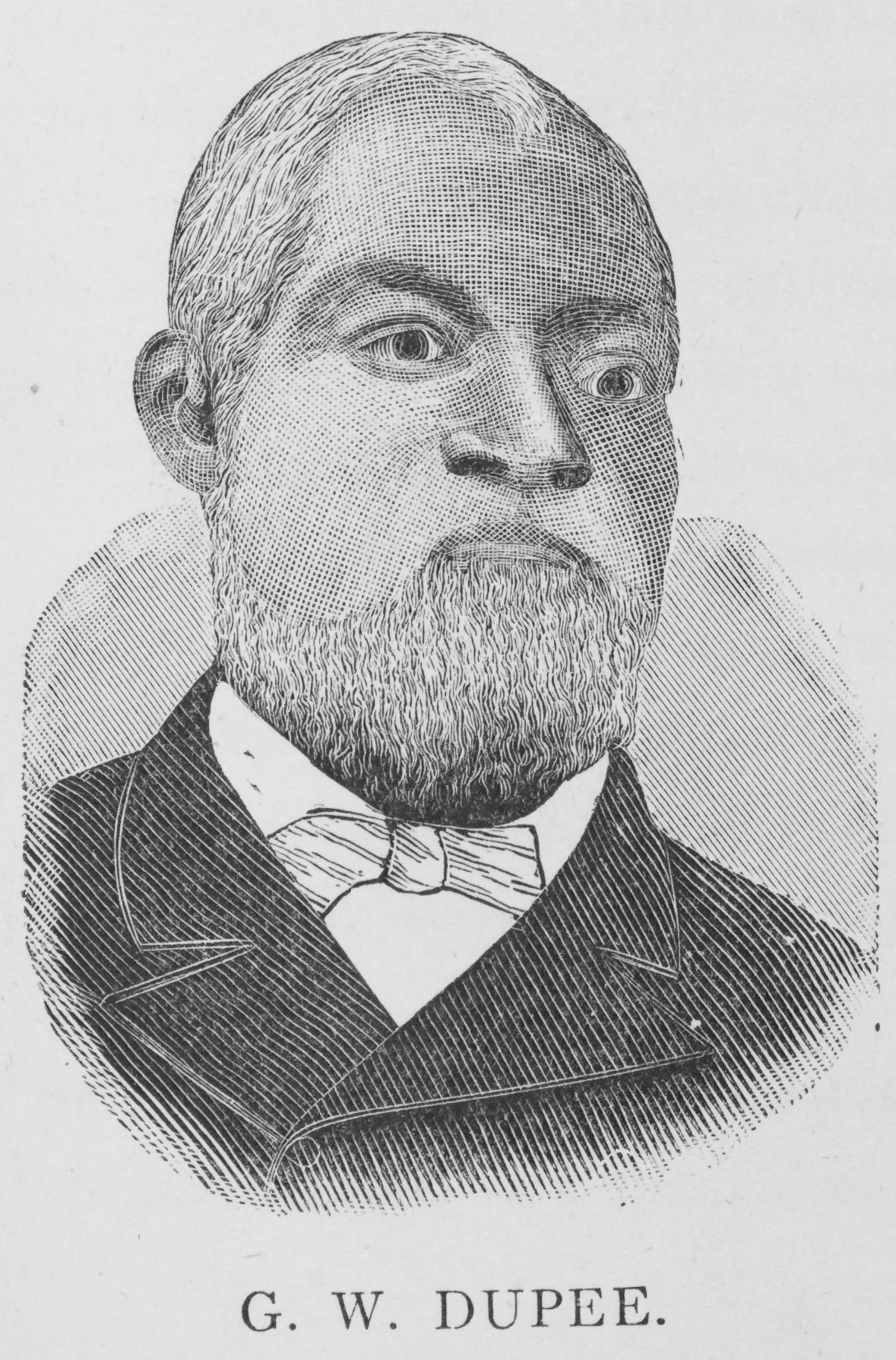
Dupee in 1887.

In 1861 Dupee organized the first meeting of colored ministers and deacons in the south or southwest states in Versailles, Kentucky. In 1864 he moved to Covington, and in 1865 became pastor of the Washington Street Colored Baptist Church in Paducah. In 1867 he organized a church in Cynthiana, and worked together with Elisha Winfield Green of Maysville. In September 1867, assisted by Elder S. Underwood and others, he organized the first district Baptist Association in the Washington Baptist Church, and was elected moderator. He was one of the organizers of the General Association of Colored Baptists of Kentucky in August 1867, and was moderator of this association from August 1871 to August 1881. In 1873 he launched the Baptist Herald, later called The American Baptist. He became Grand Senior Warden and Grand Master of the Kentucky Grand Lodge of Masons.
