= Negro Republican Party =

Branch of the Republican Party in the Southern United States

The Negro Republican Party was one name used, in the period before the end of the civil rights movement, for a branch of the Republican Party in the Southern United States, particularly Kentucky, that was predominantly made up of Black Americans.

== History ==
In the Republican Party in the South, during the Civil War and Reconstruction Era as well as decades thereafter, there was a split in the party's constituency and organization. One faction consisted of conservative White moderates, who (either gleefully or with reluctance) accepted limits on African-American civil rights and generally excluded African Americans from party participation, especially in leadership. Nationally, this faction was aligned with the contemporary Moderate Republicans, also known as "Half-Breeds", following the end of Reconstruction in the Compromise of 1877. The other faction consisted of African Americans and so-called radicals who supported African-American civil rights and party participation; nationally, this faction was aligned with the contemporary Radical Republicans, including the "Stalwart" faction of the party which subsequently materialized upon the Compromise of 1877 and succeeded the Radicals thereafter. One method of Black participation in the Republican Party at the time included involvement in the "Union Leagues"—Republican political organizations formed in the South in 1867 during the Reconstruction Era to promote Black political activity and civil rights (named after the organizations of the same name formed in the North during the Civil War to promote activity in favor of the Union).

After circa 1890 (when the factional division in the national Republican Party between the Half-Breeds and Stalwarts is generally understood to have ended), the pro-Black, racially inclusive faction of the Republican Party in the South became generally known as the black-and-tan faction, while the racially exclusive, White-centric faction became generally known as the lily-white movement. William F. Butler of Jefferson County, Kentucky, spoke at the first convention of the Negro Republican Party held in Lexington, Kentucky, in November 1867 and became the president of the party. The religious leader Elisha Green was chosen vice-president of the Kentucky branch at the Lexington convention in 1867. He was a leading Baptist preacher in Maysville and Paris until he died in 1889. Democrats opposed civil rights and voting rights for African Americans who were the majority of eligible voters in some states. In 1866, The Old Guard magazine accused the Democrats of using force and fraud to gain and retain power, and representing "but a despised faction of the American people".

In the 1890s, the New Orleans Times-Picayune published editorials in favor of disenfranchisement of Negroes on the basis that they were "unfit to vote, ignorant, shiftless, depraved and criminal-minded", and would be controlled by a "ring" of white politicians. In September 1895 after a "pow-wow" of the Negro Republican Party, the Picayune claimed that whites would be willing to accept subordinate positions in the party to control the Negro vote. In his 1920 book Children of the Slaves, the British author Stephen Graham mentions that in New Orleans the Negro Republican Party could not count for much in votes.

African American males were allowed some voting rights in Alabama until 1901, when the state functionally disenfranchised them although still technically letting them register. The Negro Republican Party in Birmingham, Alabama, was organized in opposition to the lily-white Republican party, after that party prevented any of the twenty-five black delegates from taking part in its Birmingham convention. In Maryland, while the Democrats were typically against allowing blacks to vote at all, the Republicans wanted to give them this and other basic rights, but many did not want blacks to hold important political offices or to have frequent contact with whites. Their vote was important to the Republicans, however. In 1909, at a time when the Democrats were pushing for disenfranchisement in the state, the Republicans called on all members of the Negro Republican Party to turn out on voting day in every district.

== See also ==
- Civil rights movement
- Civil rights movement (1896–1954)
- List of African-American Republicans
