= Andrea Barthwell =

American politician and doctor

Andrea Grubb Barthwell (born 1953 or 1954) worked in the White House under President of the United States George W. Bush as deputy director for Demand Reduction at the Office of National Drug Control Policy.

== Education ==
Barthwell studied at Wesleyan University in Connecticut, earning a Bachelor of Arts degree in psychology in 1976. She went on to medical school at the University of Michigan, graduating in 1980 with her M.D. Barthwell then moved to suburban Chicago where she participated in post-graduate studies at the University of Chicago and through the medical center of Northwestern University.

== Professional career ==
After entering the medical profession, Barthwell became President of the Illinois Society of Addiction Medicine and then President of the American Society of Addiction Medicine, an area of medicine that has been one of her specialties. She served as President of the Encounter Medical Group, an Oak Park, Illinois, professional consortium that also focused on addiction health care. In nearby Chicago, Barthwell also has headed two drug treatment organizations: BRASS Foundation, a provider of addiction treatment services, and interventions. In 1997, Barthwell's peers named her one of the "Best Doctors in America" in addiction medicine. In 2003, Barthwell received the Betty Ford Award, given by the Association for Medical Education and Research in Substance Abuse.

Barthwell founded and is the director of the addiction treatment network Two Dreams, with locations in Chicago, the Outer Banks, and New Orleans.

== Bush administration ==
Barthwell resigned her position in July 2004 for a possible run for the United States Senate from Illinois with the Republican Party. Earlier, nominee Jack Ryan had dropped out of the race, leaving the party without a candidate. Barthwell was favored by moderates on the Illinois Republican Central Committee to run against Democratic candidate Barack Obama, but conservative committee members ultimately won out after two days of gridlock, forcing the committee to select perennial candidate Alan Keyes of Maryland. Keyes went on to lose to Obama in a landslide.
