= Hip Hop Republican =

Music and politics blog

Hip Hop Republican is a combined music and politics blog that started in 2004 by Richard Ivory. Ivory says that he started the blog in part because of frustration with the belief that blacks must be Democrats. The blog was credited with giving conservative blacks a sense of community during the 2008 presidential election when they were often expected to vote in solidarity with Barack Obama.

The blog has since expanded to feature many other commentators alongside Ivory, including Lenny McAllister and Shirley Husar. The term "Hip-Hop Republican" as popularized by the blog has become an identity for some young black Republicans.

== See also ==
- Black conservatism in the United States
