= Stanley Wright (politician) =

American politician

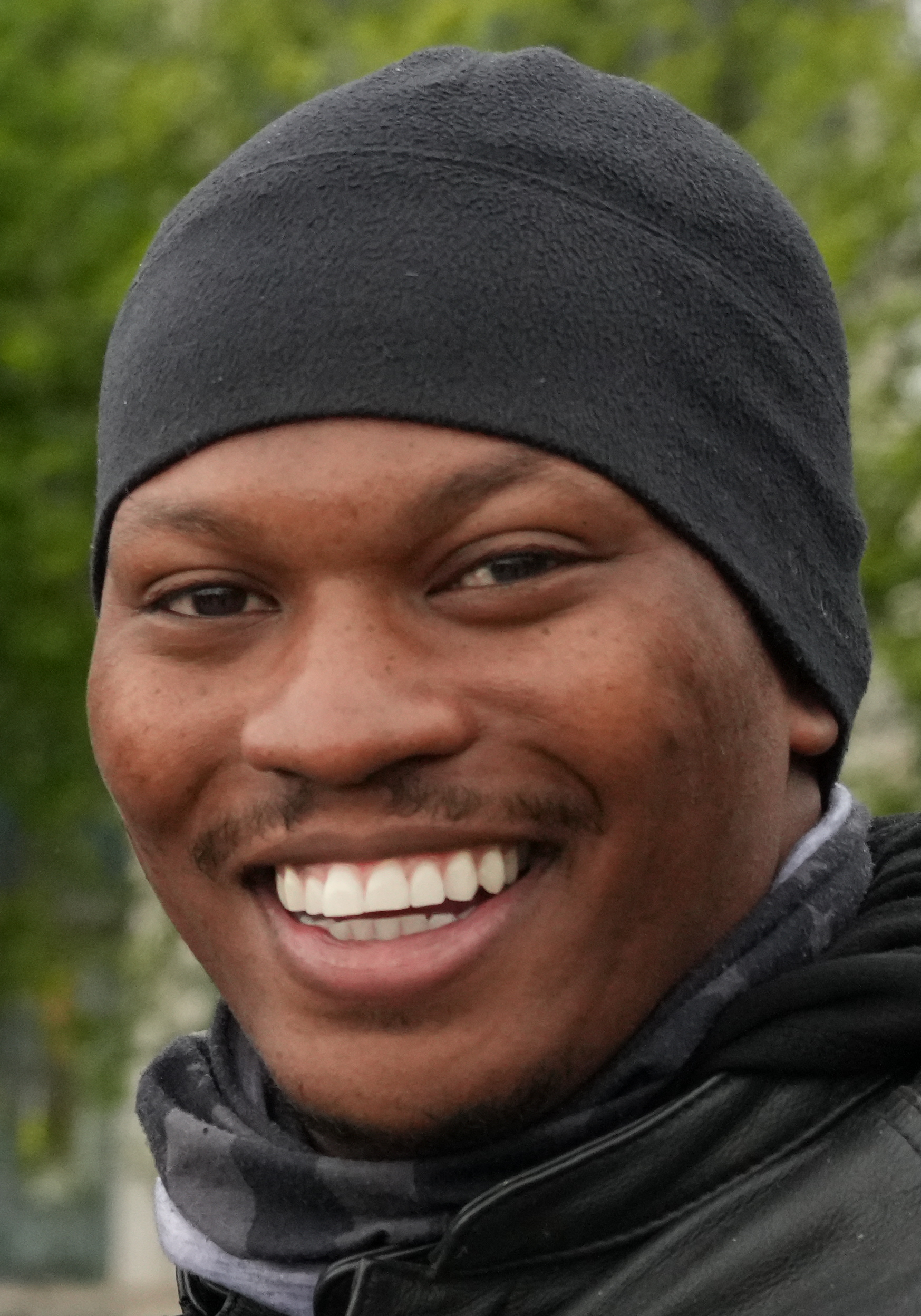

Member of the Alaska House of Representatives from the 22nd district
- In office January 17, 2023 – January 21, 2025
- Preceded by: Sara Rasmussen
- Succeeded by: Ted Eischeid

Personal details
- Born: Stanley Andrew Wright; 1985 (age 40–41) South Carolina, U.S.
- Party: Republican
- Education: University of Alaska Anchorage

Stanley Andrew Wright (born 1985) is an American politician from Alaska who served as a member of the Alaska House of Representatives from 2023 to 2025, representing District 22 which covers East Anchorage. He is a United States Navy veteran and has worked as a community systems manager in Anchorage's Community Safety and Development office.

== Legislative assignments ==
Wright has the following duties in the Alaska House:

- Vice Chair, House State Affairs
- Chair, House Military & Veterans’ Affairs
- Member, House Natural Resources (Fin Sub)
- Member, House Labor & Workforce Development (Fin Sub)
- Member, House Revenue (Fin Sub)
- Member, House Environmental Conservation (Fin Sub)
- Member, House Resources
- Member, House Energy
- Member, House Labor & Commerce
- Member, House Administration (Fin Sub)
- Member, House Joint Armed Services Committee
- Member, House Military & Veterans’ Affairs (Fin Sub)

== Electoral history ==
=== 2024 ===
==== Primary ====
2024 Nonpartisan primary
Party	Candidate	Votes	%
Democratic	Ted Eischeid	625	51.4
Republican	Stanley Wright (incumbent)	590	48.6
Total votes		1,215	100.0

==== General ====
2024 Alaska House of Representatives election, District 22
Party	Candidate	Votes	%
Democratic	Ted Eischeid	2,633	52.4
Republican	Stanley Wright (incumbent)	2,382	47.4
Write-in		12	0.2
Total votes		5,027	100.0
Democratic gain from Republican			
