= Elisha Winfield Green =

American minister

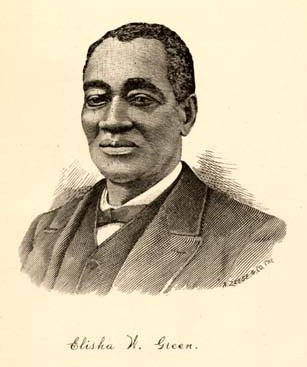
- Elisha Winfield Green, from the frontispiece of his 1888 autobiography
- Born: c. 1815; Bourbon County, Kentucky
- Died: 1893
- Occupation: Baptist leader
- Writing career
- Language: English

Elisha Winfield Green (c. 1815—1893) was a former slave who became a Baptist leader in Kentucky, US. For five years he was moderator of the Consolidated Baptist Educational Association, and he promoted the establishment of what is now the Simmons College of Kentucky. Green suffered from racial intolerance all his life. In 1883, when he was an elderly and respected minister, he was assaulted and beaten for failing to comply with a demand to give up his seat on a train.

== Early years ==
Elisha Green was born in Bourbon County, Kentucky. At the age of ten he was taken from his mother and became the slave of the Dobbyns family in Mason County, Kentucky. He married Susan Young in 1835. In 1838 his wife was sold to a Mrs. Sissen, who in turn sold her to a slave trader. His master purchased Susan from the trader and reunited the two but later was forced to sell them both when his business failed. He bought them back in 1845.

== Baptist leader ==
In the early 1840s, Green became a sexton at the white Baptist church in his town, and began to worship regularly among the white men. Some of the deacons saw his promise and asked his master to give them permission to license him as a preacher. On 10 May 1845 Green was given a licence to preach at the First African Baptist Church in Paris, Kentucky. Later he became a pastor in Maysville, Kentucky, as well, and was allowed to travel freely between the two towns.

In November 1848, a group of white men from the Baptist church in Mason County loaned Green $850 (~$31,630 in 2025) to purchase his and his family's freedom from Dobbyns, a loan that he was able to repay from his earnings as a preacher. After being freed he started a whitewashing business to earn income for his family. Green also practiced other trades including chair caning, shoe repair and carpentry. At the same time, Green began to work with other "colored" Baptist leaders such as George Washington Dupee to organize and expand the church.

Green thought that freedmen needed to own land. He and a white landowner founded the African American community near Paris. After the end of the American Civil War (1861–1865) Green became politically active, and was chosen as vice president of the Kentucky Negro Republican Party at the party's 1867 convention in Lexington. Soon after the State Convention of Colored Baptists in Kentucky had been formed in 1865, Green proposed it should set up a school. First called the Kentucky Normal and Theological Institute, it is now known as the Simmons College of Kentucky. He was the moderator of the Mount Zion Baptist Association for eleven years, and for five years was moderator of the Consolidated Baptist Educational Association.

== Racial persecution ==
Green suffered from racial bigotry throughout his life. After he had purchased his freedom, he was often accosted while he was travelling between his churches, and asked whose slave he was. Since an explanation that he was free would arouse suspicion, he would answer "Mr. Green". In the mid-1850s, on his way to Paris with his wife, Green found his son John, with his hands bound, on his way to being sold "down the river". Despite frantic efforts, he was unable to persuade the owner to at least look for a local buyer. He was helpless to protect his son. In 1855, when he was preaching at George Dupee's church in Georgetown, a white man carrying a stick entered the church and asked if there was a white man present. When he was told there was not he demanded that Green leave the pulpit.

In 1883 Green, by then an elderly and respected church leader, was traveling by train between Paris and Maysville. A white minister, who was head of a girls' school, boarded the train with a party of pupils and staff. He rudely demanded that Green give up his seat. When Green refused he was attacked and beaten, suffering injuries to his head and hand. Green sued and won damages of $24 for the assault. Reports of the incident and its outcome did nothing to delay disenfranchisement of African Americans and the growing movement among whites for segregation.

== Bibliography ==
- Elisha Winfield Green (1888). Life of the Rev. Elisha W. Green. Republican Print. Office.

== See also ==
- Plessy v. Ferguson
