= Robert A. George =

American editorial writer

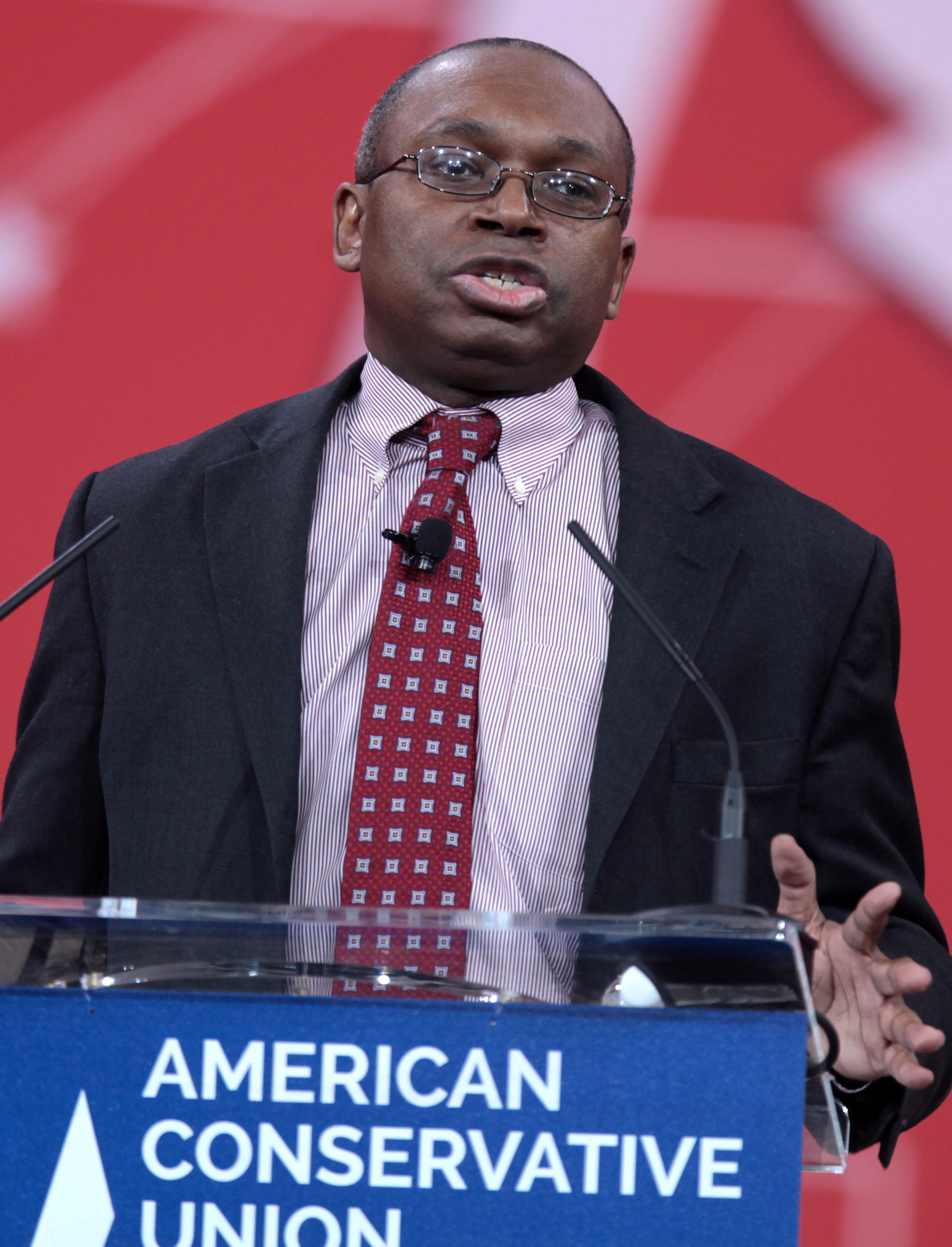
George at the 2015 CPAC

Robert A. George is a Trinidadian-American journalist, professor and comedian who formerly worked as an editorial writer for Bloomberg Opinion, the New York Daily News and the New York Post. He is generally seen as a conservative or libertarian.

== Biography ==
He was born in Trinidad and lived in the United Kingdom before moving to the United States. A 1985 graduate of St. John's College in Annapolis, Maryland, George worked for the Republican National Committee and, following the 1994 midterm elections, Speaker of the House of Representatives Newt Gingrich. He has written for Bloomberg Opinion, the New York Daily News and the New York Post

In an article for the New York Daily News, January 31, 2018, he wrote these autobiographical comments regarding his work for the GOP:

Nearly 30 years ago, a recent college graduate noticed that it was a presidential election year. He had always been interested in politics, and, while his ideological compass was all over the map, wouldn't it be interesting to see the process up close? How about attending a political convention. Heck, let's be really crazy/dumb, why not try going to both conventions, see everything really intimately, interact with politically aware folks of my own age, learn from them?

Well, if a youngish black immigrant with few connections – and less experience – in politics, what does he do? Well, he realized, he did have some connections.

On the one hand, a professor – or tutor, as faculty at his alma mater, St. John's College in Annapolis, are called – was married to a member of a prominent Democratic family. He asked the tutor if he could inquire with his wife about any possible volunteer positions at the 1988 Democratic National Convention in Atlanta. The tutor said he'd look into it.

And, a few months before, the graduate had befriended a couple who had just moved in next door. The husband was the fund-raising director at the Republican National Committee. The graduate asked his neighbor about volunteering for the '88 GOP convention in New Orleans.

After allowing a reasonable amount of time to pass, the graduate circled back. The GOP neighbor said, "Yes, we'd love to have you!" Conversely, the tutor said his wife had said, alas, that the DNC volunteer slots were assigned months before and, well ... sorry.

Who knows? Many years later, that graduate may still have become an editorial writer for two metropolitan newspapers, but the road would likely have been vastly different if Kathleen Kennedy Townsend – aunt to Joe Kennedy III – had managed to find a volunteer spot at the 1988 Democratic National Convention.

In addition to his newspaper work, George also has appeared on MSNBC, CNN, Fox and regularly appears on other political affairs programs. George has written for the conservative National Review, the libertarian Reason and the liberal Huffington Post. He also sponsors his own group political/cultural blog, Ragged Thots. In addition, George occasionally moonlights as a stand-up comic and improviser.

George was one of the first conservatives to call for the resignation of Trent Lott as Senate Majority Leader following comments made by Lott at the birthday party of retiring Senator Strom Thurmond.

George has not written for National Review since publishing an article in The New Republic that he could not vote for the re-election of George W Bush. He instead voted for Libertarian candidate Michael Badnarik and said he voted in 2000 for Harry Browne. More recently, George has worked as a comedian and as a professor for the Ducere Business School.

== Personal life ==
George is Catholic. He shares a name with a well known Princeton University professor and ethicist. Because they often wrote for the same publications, it became standard to refer to George as Robert A. George and to the Princeton professor as Robert P. George.

== See also ==
- Black conservatism in the United States
