= Edwin Sexton =

Kansas state legislator

Edwin T. Sexton Jr. (c. 1923 – September 16, 1983) was a state legislator in Kansas. A Republican, he was appointed to fill an unexpired term. He was a newspaper editor in Wichita, Kansas.

Sexton was born in Wichita, Kansas, served in the United States Army, and studied at the University of Wichita and University of Chicago. He served in the Kansas Senate from 1964 to 1966. He was appointed to the Kansas Senate by Kansas governor John Anderson Jr. after William C. Farmer resigned. He had been a field representative for congressman Garner E. Shriver. After stepping down from the Kansas Senate, Sexton moved to Silver Spring, Maryland, and became a member of the Republican National Committee in 1966, and also directed the black political division and served as deputy assistant to the RNC chair. Between 1973 and 1977, Sexton worked for the United States Department of Commerce as deputy director of the minority business division. He was also active in the Black Republican Council and the NAACP. In the 1970s, Sexton founded Sexton and Associates, a financial and management consulting firm, and was the company's president until his death.

Sexton married Dorothy Hellen, with whom he had two daughters. At the time of his death from a heart attack on September 16, 1983, Sexton was traveling between Washington, D.C., and Kansas on a Republic Airlines flight, which made an emergency stop at the Nashville International Airport on his behalf.
