= Shandy W. Jones =

American politician

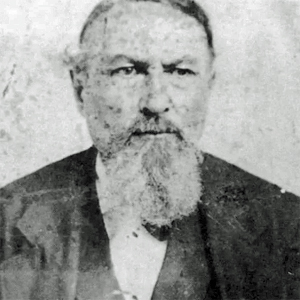
Shandy W. Jones

Shandy Wesley Jones (December 20, 1816 – February 4, 1886) was an American clergyman, photographer, barber, state legislator, and customs inspector in Tuscaloosa, Alabama.

Born into slavery December 20, 1816 he was freed as a child, became a barber and prosperous real estate investor. He married Evalina Love in 1837 and together they had 14 children although two died as infants and one as a young man.

He helped establish Hunter's Chapel AME Zion Church in Tuscaloosa after the American Civil War in May 1866. It was the first Methodist church for African Americans in Tuscaloosa and its original rented locations was Bryant-Denny Stadium is now located.

He was elected to serve in the Alabama House of Representatives as a Republican in 1868 during the Reconstruction era and served until 1870. The other representative for Tuscaloosa was Ryland Randolph, who was a KKK supporter and newspaper owner. In his paper Randolph ran a cartoons mocking Jones and publishing a cartoon on KKK lynchings saying there "was room on the branch for Jones".

Although no longer a representative he was still involved in politics and represented Tuscaloosa county at the 1874 Radical State Convention.

He was documented as being "mulatto". In 1869, he fled KKK threats to Moundville, Alabama, and eventually settled in Mobile. He was followed by most of family.

Jones was involved in the American Colonization Society and supported efforts to colonize Liberia with African Americans.

He died February 4, 1886, from a heart condition. He is buried in Mobile's Magnolia Cemetery. Family members published Descendants of Shandy Wesley Jones and Evalina Love Jones -- The Story of An African American Family of Tuscaloosa, Alabama in 1993.

A history marker plaque was unveiled on the State Capitol lawn in Montgomery honoring the 80 Reconstruction era black legislators including Jones.
