= Hercules Simons =

American politician

South Carolina House of Representatives

Hercules Simmons (born 1840s), sometimes spelled Simons was a state legislator in South Carolina during the Reconstruction era. He represented Colleton County.
