= G. Ward Hubbs =

American historian

G. Ward Hubbs is a professor emeritus, reference librarian, and archivist, who worked at Birmingham–Southern College. He wrote a book on Tuscaloosa's history to commemorate its bicentennial and authored the books Searching for Freedom after the Civil War: Klansman, Carpetbagger, Scalawag, and Freedman and Voices from Company D: Diaries by the Greensboro Guards, Fifth Alabama Infantry Regiment, Army of Northern Virginia. He has won several literary awards. He is the editor of a book of humorous and "rowdy" tales from John Gorman Barr.

He was a protege of George Rable.

== Written work ==
- Tuscaloosa: 200 Years in the Making (2019)
- Searching for Freedom after the Civil War: Klansman, Carpetbagger, Scalawag, and Freedman
- Voices from Company D: Diaries by the Greensboro Guards, Fifth Alabama Infantry Regiment, Army of Northern Virginia, University of Georgia Press
- Rowdy Tales from Early Alabama: The Humor of John Gorman Barr, editor
