= Lenny McAllister =

American journalist

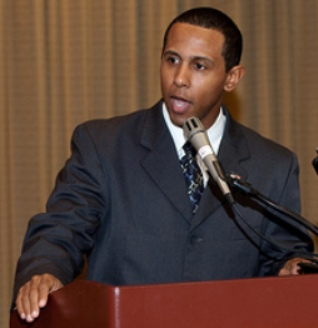
- Born: Leonard Francis McAllister Jr. January 13, 1972 (age 54); Pittsburgh, Pennsylvania, U.S.
- Education: Davidson College
- Occupation: Author
- Political party: Republican
- Website: www.lennymcallister.com

Leonard Francis McAllister Jr. (born January 13, 1972) is an American political commentator for a number of newspapers and websites, including RedState, AOL, and The Root. He was the 2016 Republican Candidate for US Congress in Pennsylvania's 14th district after winning the primary by way of write-in votes, tripling the requirement for the nomination. From 2008 through 2017, his media platform including hosting shows on the Pittsburgh Cable News Channel and KDKA (1020AM/101.1FM) in Pittsburgh and WVON in Chicago as well as appearing regularly on CNN, HLN, Al Jazeera America, Radio New Zealand, and other outlets. As an African-American that is part of the Black Conservatism movement, he is often attributed to positions that mirror some civil rights activists including his positions on ending stop and frisk practices on African-Americans as a violation of the Constitution.

== Early life ==
McAllister was born Leonard Francis McAllister, Jr. on January 13, 1972, in Pittsburgh to parents Leonard, Sr. and Carol McAllister. Both he and his mother almost died during childbirth. McAllister grew up in the Penn Hills, a suburb outside Pittsburgh. His father was a computer technician and an electrician for a local steel mill, and his mother ran a daycare out of the family home before her death in 2006.

== Education and early adulthood ==
McAllister attended middle school at St. Bart's School, playing football and basketball. Always undersized, McAllister quarterbacked the school's 14-and-under football team to a championship as an 11-year-old. He then attended Central Catholic High School for a few years before leaving to take a scholarship to Shady Side Academy. He graduated from Shady Side in 1989, earning scholarship offers to several universities.

In 1989, McAllister enrolled at Davidson College, on "the 13-year path to a four-year degree". He was slated to walk-on the Davidson basketball team as a freshman but declined after coach Bobby Hussey left Davidson after the 1988–1989 school year. He was a pitcher on the baseball team. He left school in 1992 for a sabbatical that lasted a decade. Before leaving that spring, he contributed a negative article on Black History Month to the school paper The Davidsonian, receiving numerous anonymous threats from outraged readers.

McAllister dropped out of college for a decade and became a father at age 21 with the first of his two children. In 2000, McAllister re-enrolled at Davidson College, graduating with a history degree in 2002.

== Career ==
In 2005, McAllister ran for office in Davidson, North Carolina, losing as the only Republican against an all-Democrat slate by only 56 votes. In 2007, he ran and lost another close race, after McAllister was slated to win one of five seats in non-official polling. In July 2008, he was featured in a series of commercials on Black Entertainment Television regarding the upcoming election. Soon after, Fox Charlotte cast him as their political contributor during the 2008 campaign. McAllister provided live commentary during question-and-answer sessions and live editorials weekly on the "Fox News Rising" morning show, the Charlotte morning show.

McAllister attended the 2008 Republican National Convention representing Hip Hop Republicans, and provided commentary on CNN, Fox Charlotte, XM Radio, and BET, as well as webcasts on Washington Post and Fox. On CNN American Morning, he gave a critical view of the approach to the Governor Sarah Palin VP introduction to America, saying that her daughter’s pregnancy was an opportunity to make a connection to everyday Americans instead of trying to portray the Palins as perfect. In March 2013, he ran as a candidate in the Republican primary for Illinois's 2nd congressional district special election, but lost. In 2016, he was the unsuccessful Republican nominee for US Congress in Pennsylvania's 14th congressional district, losing to incumbent Democrat Mike Doyle.

=== Writing and speaking presence ===
McAllister writes for several online magazines and blogs. He has also been published in the Charlotte Post, Newsweek, and The Dallas Morning News. He usually represents the Republican point of view in his writings, but from an Afro-centric perspective and has spoken out against racism in politics and society. He was a featured speaker at several Tea Party protests across the nation throughout 2009.

== See also ==
- Black conservatism in the United States
