= William F. Butler =

American politician

William F. Butler was an American politician and African American leader born in Jefferson County, Kentucky, United States who became president of the Negro Republican Party formed after the American Civil War.

Speaking in Louisville, Kentucky in 1867, Butler said "We claim ... a position of political equality with whites as a matter of right, as a matter of justice". At the first convention of the Negro Republican Party, held in Lexington, Kentucky in November 1867, he said "First we had the cartridge box, now we want the ballot box, and soon we will get the jury box". Expanding on this theme, he spoke of the service of African Americans in the Union Army during the civil war, saying "We went out and fought the battles of our country, and gained our liberties, but we were left without the means of protecting ourselves in the employment of that liberty. We need and must have the ballot box for that purpose". Later, Butler moved to New York City, and was a member of the New York delegation to the 1872 Republican National Convention in Philadelphia.
