= African American Engagement Office =

U.S. political organization

An African American Engagement Office is a United States–based center established by Republican Party operatives in an effort to secure the votes of African Americans. Currently there are two African American Engagement Offices, one in Charlotte, North Carolina, and one in Detroit, Michigan. First established in late 2013, the offices are part of the Republican National Committee's $10 million voter engagement push in the states of Alabama, Arkansas, Colorado, Georgia, Louisiana, Michigan, North Carolina, Ohio, Pennsylvania, Virginia, and Wisconsin.

Kentucky Senator Rand Paul presided over the inauguration of Detroit's African American Engagement Office in December 2013. The office's current national director is Ashley Bell and its Deputy National Director is Ayshia Connors.
