= Ashley Bell (Georgia politician) =

American lawyer and politician

Personal details
- Born: Gainesville, Georgia, U.S.
- Party: Republican (2010–present)
- Other political affiliations: Democratic (before 2010)
- Education: Valdosta State University (BA); Louisiana State University (JD)

Ashley Daniel Bell is an American lawyer, political advisor, and government official serving as Regional Administrator of the Small Business Administration for Region IV.

In October 2019, it was announced that Bell would serve as a White House Policy Advisor for Entrepreneurship and Innovation in the Office of American Innovation.

== Early life and education ==
Bell was born and raised in Gainesville, Georgia.

In 2001, Bell earned a Bachelor of Arts degree in political science from Valdosta State University, where he served as president of the Student Government Association and founded the local chapter of the Iota Phi Theta fraternity. He earned a Juris Doctor from Louisiana State University. He also attended Harvard University's John F. Kennedy School of Government, where he was a 21st Century Leadership Fellow. He also has an honorary doctorate in Intercultural & Urban Studies from Lighthouse College.

== Career ==
=== Legal career ===
Bell began his career as a public defender, later co-founding the law firm of Bell & Washington LLP based in Atlanta. Bell initially focused on general civil litigation, later going on to concentrate on public finance and government litigation. After leaving the Trump Administration in 2020, Bell became a partner in Dentons' policy practice.

=== Political ===
Previously a Democrat, Bell left the party to become a Republican in 2010. Bell was elected to the Hall County, Georgia County Commission at the age of 27.

From 2011 to 2012, he was the senior surrogate for the Newt Gingrich 2012 presidential campaign. In 2012, he was appointed as a special advisor to Mitt Romney during the general election and co-chaired "Blacks for Romney" with U.S. Senator Tim Scott.

In 2014, Bell was the senior surrogate for Jack Kingston's Senate campaign. He was also the national co-chair for the Rand Paul 2016 presidential campaign.

In 2016, Bell was appointed senior strategist and National Director of African-American Political Engagement for the Republican National Committee. In 2017, he joined the Trump-Pence Presidential Transition Team, later serving as a special assistant to the Secretary of State and working in the Bureau of Public Affairs.

On July 7, 2017, the United States Peace Corps announced Bell as the new associate director for External Affairs, overseeing Peace Corps' Offices of Communications, Congressional Relations, Gifts and Grants Management, and Strategic Partnerships and Intergovernmental Affairs.

Bell was appointed on February 21, 2018, by President Donald Trump to serve as regional administrator for the U.S. Small Business Administration for Region IV; serving nine districts located in Alabama, Florida, Georgia, Kentucky, Mississippi, North Carolina, South Carolina, and Tennessee. Bell had oversight of over $5 billion in SBA-backed lending, which counseled over 225,000 entrepreneurs last year in Region IV, and the contracting programs for small business, which accounted for over 23% of all federal contracts awarded.

=== Non-profit and volunteer service ===
Bell is the founder and CEO of the 20/20 Bipartisan Justice Center, which purports to be the only nationwide coalition of Black Republicans, Democrats and Independents focused on criminal justice reform.

He is also the Founder of Generation Inspiration, which describes its mission as being to teach life skills not taught in the classroom to at-risk students of color in Bell's hometown of Gainesville, Georgia, setting them on a trajectory for success.

== Reception ==
In 2016, Bell was listed as one of the 2016 Top 40 Young Lawyers by the American Bar Association and a Lawyer on the Rise by Georgia's The Daily Report. He was also named a 2017 Georgia Super Lawyer Rising Star.
