= Catherine Austin Fitts =

American banker and public official

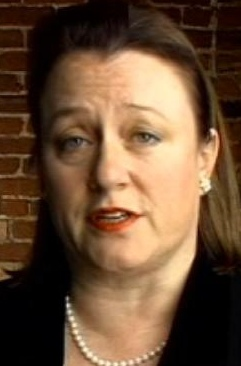

Assistant Secretary of Housing and Urban Development for Housing
- In office 1989–1990
- President: George H. W. Bush
- Preceded by: Thomas Demery
- Succeeded by: Arthur J. Hill

Personal details
- Born: December 24, 1950 (age 75) Philadelphia, Pennsylvania, United States
- Party: Republican
- Education: MBA, University of Pennsylvania; B.A., University of Pennsylvania
- Website: https://solari.com, The Solari Report

Catherine Austin Fitts (born December 24, 1950) is an American investment banker and former public official who served as managing director of Dillon, Read & Co. and, during the Presidency of George H. W. Bush, as United States Assistant Secretary of Housing and Urban Development for Housing. She has widely written and commented on the subject of public spending and has alleged several large-scale instances of government fraud.

== Early life and education ==
Catherine Austin Fitts was born in Philadelphia, Pennsylvania. She earned an AA degree from Bennett College in 1970 and a BA degree in history from the University of Pennsylvania in 1974. After graduating, she briefly worked as a bartender until one of her customers, who was director of admissions at the Wharton School, encouraged her to pursue graduate studies. She received her MBA from Wharton in 1978.

== Career ==
=== Dillon, Read & Co. ===
After graduate school, Fitts went to work at Dillon, Read & Co. While there, in 1982, she organized a novel municipal bond sale to raise several billion dollars to revitalize the New York Subway System, marking the first time that a public agency had sold bonds backed by rider fares. In 1986, Fitts became the first woman promoted to managing director of Dillon, Read & Co. in the investment bank's then 156 year history. During her time as managing director, Businessweek described Fitts as "Wall Street's foremost champion" of public utilities bonds.

=== U.S. Department of Housing and Urban Development (HUD) ===
During the 1988 United States presidential election, Fitts worked on the campaign of George H. W. Bush and was appointed as Assistant Secretary of Housing and Urban Development for Housing in the Bush administration, where she was charged with repairing the department's reputation in the aftermath of the savings and loan crisis. Among her initial observations upon taking office was that the department had a $300 billion portfolio of mortgage insurance but only employed one certified actuary. The reforms she announced included a plan to sell government-foreclosed homes at a 50-percent discount to non-profit organizations to operate as rentals. Previously, the government had sought to sell residential properties at the highest possible value, which resulted in a glut of real estate in its portfolio that had to be managed at great expense, as well as in shortages of housing stock in some high-density markets.

She resigned her post in 1990, following a report that her relationship with Secretary of Housing and Urban Development Jack Kemp had soured, a report Kemp denied. Fitts' departure prompted criticism of Kemp; she had been – according to Neal Peirce – "widely regarded as the best manager he brought in".

According to Fitts, she was offered an appointment to the Federal Reserve Board of Governors after her departure from HUD but declined, preferring to return to the private sector instead.

=== Hamilton Securities and Solari ===
After leaving government, Fitts founded Hamilton Securities, an employee-owned brokerage house, which she ran until 1998. In 1993, Hamilton Securities won a contract with HUD to manage its $500 billion investment portfolio. While managing HUD's portfolio, Fitts devised a location-based mortgage debt resale software program that may have resulted in an increase in department revenue of several hundreds of millions of dollars.

In 1997, HUD canceled the Hamilton contract over what it claimed were accounting errors involving the program; an investigation into Hamilton Securities was launched by the HUD Inspector-General, the FBI, and the Securities and Exchange Commission. According to Fitts, the investigation was undertaken as retribution against her; she claimed that Community Wizard data revealed that some federally guaranteed mortgage securities may have been fraudulently issued. One outside complainant, a government contractor, charged insider dealing and bid rigging in its contention that Hamilton Securities had obtained its HUD business due to favoritism. In 2002 the investigation was closed, and investigators stated they had found no evidence of wrongdoing by Fitts or Hamilton Securities.

Fitts was a member of the Global Business Network's "Worldview" from 1996-1997, and served on the advisory board for The Arlington Institute from June 1998 to June 2000.

=== Writing and commentary ===
Fitts has researched and commented on government spending. In a 2004 study published in World Affairs: The Journal of International Issues, she purported to find "evidence that a very large proportion of the nation's wealth is being illegally diverted since several decades into secret, unaccountable channels and programmes with unspecified purposes, including covert operations and subversions abroad and clandestine military R&D at home. Public institutions have been infiltrated and taken over by shadowy groups in the service of powerful private and vested interests, often at the expense of the common good."

In 2017 Fitts co-authored a report, with Michigan State University economist Mark Skidmore, that claimed to find $21 trillion in "unauthorized spending" by the U.S. Department of Defense and U.S. Department of Housing and Urban Development over a 17-year period.

Fitts has claimed that HUD's mission of spurring economic growth is secondary to what she contends is its use as a fundraising mechanism for military and intelligence agencies involving a complex securities scheme using HUD-backed Ginnie Mae investments. According to Fitts, HUD overpays to rehabilitate public housing and funnels the difference into unaudited black budget programs at the behest of national security agencies.

During the United States presidential election, 2016, Fitts supported the campaign of Donald Trump. On December 8, 2020, Trump retweeted one of Fitts' tweets which linked to an article on Breitbart. She has donated to political campaigns of Democrats Cynthia McKinney and Marcy Kaptur, and Republicans Rand Paul and Thomas Massie.

According to The Washington Post, during the COVID-19 pandemic, Fitts "worked with anti-vaccine activist Robert F. Kennedy Jr. to promote unfounded claims about the pandemic and to oppose lockdown measures put in place to slow the spread of the virus" and recorded a lengthy interview as part of the 2020 film Planet Lockdown which The Washington Post reports parroted "false claims about the pandemic". She has given interviews in alternate media, such as kla.tv, alleging fraud in the US central banking system and US government ("21 trillion dollars have been stolen") and "massive fraud" in the 2020 election and Electoral fraud in US elections for many years before 2020.
