= Dan Arvizu =

American engineer

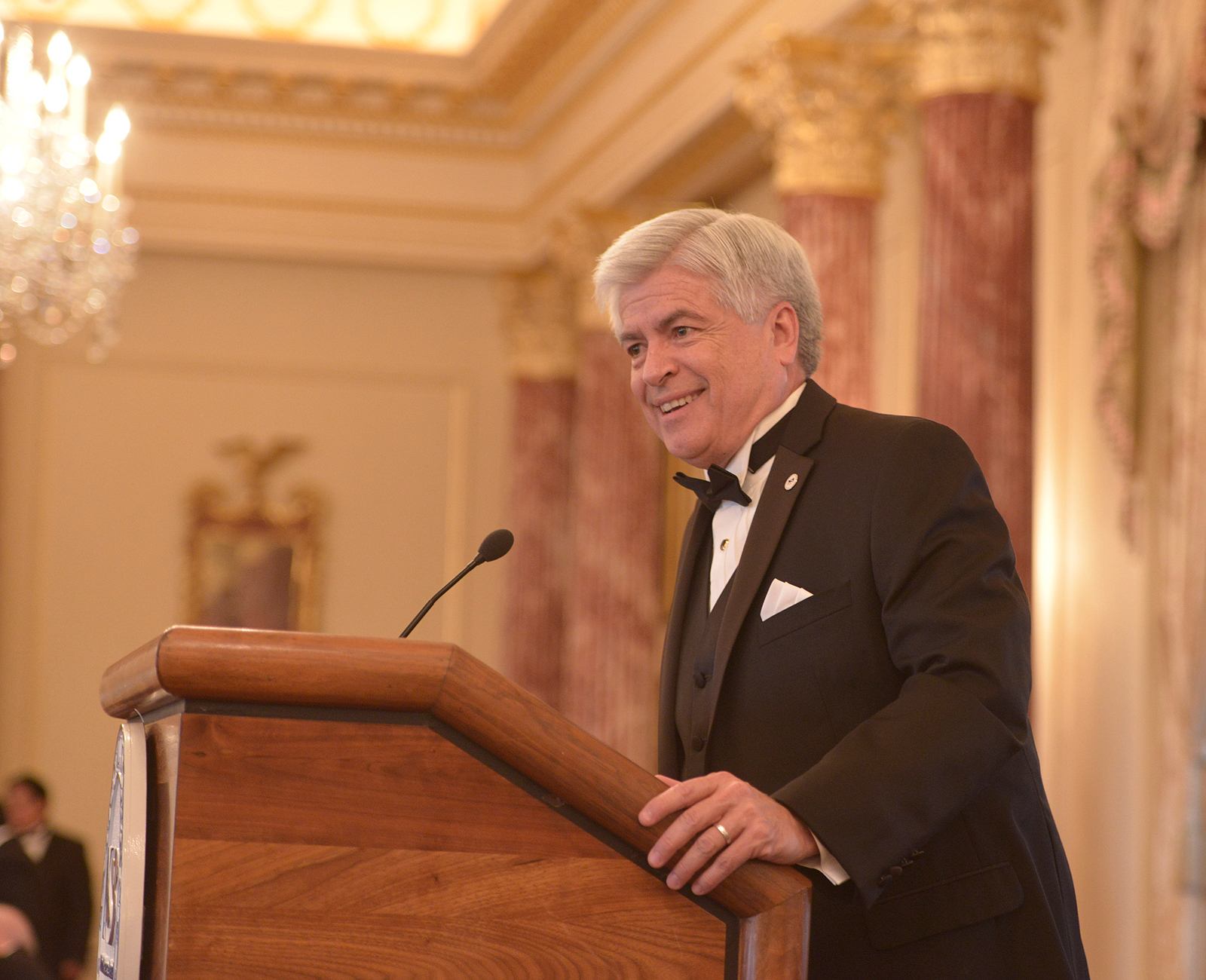

Dan Arvizu is a mechanical engineer at the United States Department of Energy (DOE) National Laboratories, where he has taken on various roles over the course of more than 30 years. Arvizu is also an expert in energy materials, technology commercialization and process sciences. He is a leader in higher education that is determined to harness education, research, and outreach initiatives to promote economic development and social mobility. Since 2021, he has been a member of the President’s Council of Advisors on Science and Technology (PCAST). Arvizu is married to Sheryl Arvizu, with whom he has 8 children and stepchildren, as well as 8 grandchildren.

== Career ==
Arvizu started his career working at AT&T Bell Telephone Labs in 1973, subsequently working for Sandia National Laboratories and CH2M HILL Companies in 1976 and 1998. Arvizu was the first Hispanic person to lead the DOE National Laboratory, where he also was the former director and chief executive of the National Renewable Energy Laboratory, and currently director emeritus. He served as board chair to the National Science Board (NSB) from 2004-2016, where he was appointed the position by Presidents George W. Bush and Barack Obama. Arvizu also served on advisory committees which included the State Farm Mutual Insurance Board of Directors, the Stanford Precourt Institute for Energy Advisory Council, and the Singapore International Advisory Panel on Energy. He is also a board member of the American Council on Renewable Energy.

Arvizu is a member of the National Academy of Engineering (NAE) and National Academy of Public Administration. Dan Arvizu has been serving as the chancellor of New Mexico State University and Chief Executive of the New Mexico State University System since 2018. Additionally, he was appointed twice to the National Science Board, overseeing the National Science Foundation. Arvizu also served as the senior advisor for the Emerson Elemental, for Emerson Collective.

Arvizu became a board member of MRIGlobal in 2020. Arvizu serves as the Director Emeritus of the National Renewable Energy Laboratory, contributing to integrate new clean technology around the world.

Arvizu holds a B.S. in Mechanical Engineering from New Mexico State University and a M.S. and Ph.D. in Mechanical Engineering from Stanford University.

Arvizu was the Chancellor and Chief Executive of New Mexico State University from 2018–2023. After NMSU President John Flores stepped down in January 2022, Arvizu became the sole leader of both the university's main campus and the NMSU system.

In 2025, Dr. Arvizu and his wife own and operate Apogee Therapeutics, a cannabis dispensary in El Paso.
