= Solar Energy Research, Development and Demonstration Act of 1974 =

SOLAR ENERGY RESEARCH ACT (1974)
- Long title: Solar Energy Research, Development, and Demonstration Act of 1974
- Enacted by: the 93rd United States Congress

Legislative history
- Signed into law by President Gerald Ford on October 26, 1974

The Solar Energy Research, Development and Demonstration Act of 1974 (SERDDA) is legislation that the 93rd U.S. Congress enacted on October 26, 1974.

It created two key programs:

- The Solar Energy Coordination and Management Project
- The Solar Energy Research Institute (the predecessor to the National Energy Research Laboratory

== SERDDA projects ==
=== The Solar Energy Coordination and Management Project (SECMJ) ===
The legislation required that the Project consist of the following members:

- An assistant director of the National Science Foundation;
- An Assistant Secretary of Housing and Urban Development;
- A member of the Federal Power Commission;
- An Associate Administrator of the National Aeronautics and Space Administration;
- The General Manager of the Atomic Energy Commission; and
- A member to be designated by the President.

=== Resource Determination and Evaluation ===
- The development of better methods for predicting the availability of all solar energy resources, over long time periods and by geographic location;
- The development of advanced meteorological, oceanographic, and other instruments, methodology, and procedures necessary to measure the quality and quantity of all solar resources over a periodic bases;
- The development of activities, arrangements, and procedures for the collection, evaluation, and dissemination of information and data relating to solar energy resource assessment.

=== Research and Development ===
- Conduct, encourage, and promote scientific research and studies to develop effective and economical processes and equipment for the purpose of utilizing solar energy in an acceptable manner for beneficial uses;
- Carry out systems, economic, social, and environmental studies to provide a basis for research, development and demonstration planning and phasing; and
- Perform or cause to be performed technology assessments relevant to the utilization of solar energy.

=== Solar Energy Technology Utilization ===
To establish and operate a Solar Energy Information Data Bank for the purpose of collecting, reviewing, processing, and disseminating information and data in all of the solar energy technologies.

=== Demonstration ===
To design and construct, facilities, or power plants of sufficient size to demonstrate the technical and economic feasibility of utilizing the various forms of solar energy.

=== International Cooperation ===
For cooperation for scientific research with the following:

- Interinstitutional, bilateral, or multilateral research projects in the field of solar energy; and
- Agreements and programs which will facilitate the exchange of information and data relating to solar energy resource assessment and solar energy technologies.

=== Scientific and Technical Education ===
In collaboration with National Science Foundation, the SECMJ is authorized and directed to support programs of education in the sciences and engineering to provide the necessary trained personnel to perform the solar energy research, development, and demonstration activities.

=== The Solar Energy Research Institute (SERC) ===
The act created SERI, the predecessor to the National Renewable Energy Laboratory (NREL).
