= Faith Whittlesey =

American politician

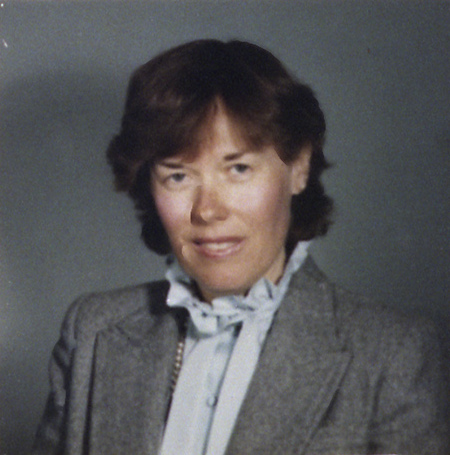

United States Ambassador to Switzerland
- In office May 31, 1985 – June 14, 1988
- President: Ronald Reagan
- Preceded by: John Davis Lodge
- Succeeded by: Philip D. Winn
- In office October 23, 1981 – February 28, 1983
- President: Ronald Reagan
- Preceded by: Richard D. Vine
- Succeeded by: John Davis Lodge

6th Director of the Office of Public Liaison
- In office March 3, 1983 – March 19, 1985
- President: Ronald Reagan
- Preceded by: Liddy Dole
- Succeeded by: Linda Chavez

Member of the Pennsylvania House of Representatives from the 166th district
- In office January 3, 1973 – September 11, 1976
- Preceded by: George Johnson
- Succeeded by: Stephen Freind

Personal details
- Born: Faith Amy Ryan; February 21, 1939 Jersey City, New Jersey, U.S.
- Died: May 21, 2018 (aged 79) Washington, D.C., U.S.
- Party: Democratic (before 1964); Republican (1964–2018)
- Spouse: Roger Whittlesey (m. 1967–1974)
- Children: 3
- Education: Wells College (BA); University of Pennsylvania (LLB)

Faith Amy Whittlesey (née Ryan; February 21, 1939 – May 21, 2018) was an American Republican politician, White House Senior Staff member, and author. She was noted for her efforts to communicate Ronald Reagan's entire policy agenda to U.S. opinion leaders and for bringing together for the first time in the Reagan White House evangelical, Catholic, and other conservative religious groups who opposed legalized abortion and were concerned about moral and cultural decline and the break-up of the family. These groups became a significant component of the Reagan coalition as they grew more politically self-conscious in the 1980s.

She organized the White House Central American Outreach Group at the direction of Chief of Staff James Baker to provide information about Reagan's anti-communist policies in the region and was an active supporter of Reagan's defense buildup and the Strategic Defense Initiative (SDI).

Whittlesey served twice for a total of nearly 5 years as U.S. Ambassador to Switzerland. In between her tenures as ambassador, she served for 2 years on the Reagan White House Senior Staff as Assistant to the President for Public Liaison.

== Early life and education ==
Faith Amy Ryan was born in 1939 in Jersey City, New Jersey, to Martin Roy Ryan and Amy Jerusha (Covell). She grew up in Williamsville, New York.

Her father was a "Catholic in the Irish tradition" and it was incorrectly assumed that Faith grew up as a Catholic, when her mother's family did not approve of her father's Catholicism. "[S]o he left the Catholic Church", Whittlesey wrote in her memoir. "He attended the Methodist Church with my mother and brother, Tom, and me. I was thus raised as a Methodist. As a family we went to the Williamsville, New York, Methodist Church every Sunday. I went to regular Sunday school and sang in the choirs." However, she converted to Roman Catholicism in 2000.

She earned a full-tuition scholarship to attend Wells College in Aurora, New York, where she graduated in 1960. She earned a full-tuition scholarship to the law school at the University of Pennsylvania.

== Career ==
To earn money while in law school, Whittlesey became a substitute teacher in the City of Philadelphia (1962–64) because "[i]n my last year of law school [the female students] were advised by the law school administration not to even come to the [law firm job] interviews because we would not be hired". She was admitted to the bar of Pennsylvania in 1964.

=== Pennsylvania State Representative ===
In 1972 she was elected to the Pennsylvania House of Representatives representing the 166th Legislative District in Delaware County. She had canvassed door-to-door for this race while pregnant with her third child, William. In 1974, she was reelected to the Legislature. In 1975, she was elected to the Delaware County Board of Commissioners, now known as the Delaware County Council and reelected in 1979. (Delaware County was at the time larger in population than 5 states of the Union.) She served alternately as Chairman and Vice Chairman. She lost the 1978 Republican primary for Lt. Governor of Pennsylvania.

While serving in the Delaware County government, Whittlesey briefly held her first job in the private sector, taking a part-time job at the law firm Wolf, Block, Schorr & Solis-Cohen LLP in Philadelphia.

=== Ambassador to Switzerland ===
Whittlesey served as U.S. Ambassador to Switzerland from 1981 to 83. In her first term as Swiss Ambassador she initiated negotiations in an acrimonious dispute between the U.S. and Switzerland that later led to the signing of a "Memorandum of Understanding on Insider Trading", the first major changing of the strict tradition of Swiss banking secrecy. Of this memorandum, Ambassador Jean Zwahlen, later a Member of the Governing Board of the Swiss National Bank, wrote her: "I still keep a vivid memory of your skill to help delicate negotiations in the 80s."

=== White House Liaison Office ===
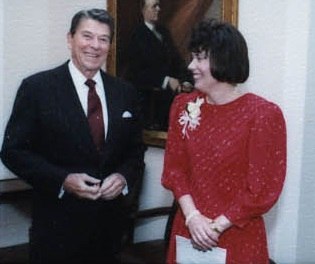
Whittlesey with President Ronald Reagan in 1985

Whittlesey was named Assistant to the President for Public Liaison in 1983 at the suggestion of Ronald Reagan's Ambassador to Austria and personal assistant Helene von Damm, and at the urging of White House Chief of Staff James Baker and Deputy Chief of Staff Michael Deaver.

Her tenure was marked by initiatives to improve the access of conservative religious believers to the American political process and national policymaking. She was considered their most "aggressive ally" in the White House.

She wrote a memo in October 1983 that fundamentalist and evangelical groups had done "little organizational work" for "the 1984 election period" and that to maintain Ronald Reagan's "credibility" with those groups, Catholics in particular, "the tuition tax credit bill must come up for Senate floor action this fall". She noted that school prayer was "not unlike the tuition tax credit issue. Politically we win if we get votes on the Senate floor".

In 1985, she sent the anti-abortion film The Silent Scream, which was a documentary of an abortion at three months shown via ultrasound, produced in 1984 by anti-abortion activist and former NARAL founder Bernard Nathanson, to every member of Congress and arranged for a screening at the White House at which Nathanson presented the film.

At its height, her office included 38 people. She developed White House outreach to labor leaders, "Reagan Democrats", and Jewish leaders. She clashed with some other members of the Reagan White House senior staff whom she regarded as "largely Washington permanent government party functionaries not very committed to advocating the President's policies in a serious or consistent way."

While she was the Director of the Liaison Office (1983–85), there were conflicts with the staff of Reagan's Chief of Staff James A. Baker III and his deputy Michael Deaver, which led to Senator Arlen Specter (R-PA) and others urging her to take a federal judgeship on the Third Circuit Court of Appeals. After careful consideration, she declined the nomination. A judicial appointment would have effectively removed her from the public policy and political arena. She had taken the job of Public Liaison because of "a profound sense of obligation to the grassroots voters who had elected Reagan believing him to be a man of deep principle and traditional faith."

She returned to Switzerland after Donald Regan became Chief of Staff, replacing James A. Baker.

=== Iran-Contra ===
At the direction of White House Chief of Staff James Baker, Whittlesey spent a great deal of her time as assistant to the President for Public Liaison organizing communication of information about Reagan's policies in Central America and, in particular, the anticommunist "Contras" in Nicaragua.

In 1983, she established the White House Outreach Working Group on Central America to help increase private sector understanding of Reagan's policies, including working with, among many other individuals and groups, the American Security Council Foundation, to produce anti-Sandinista propaganda (what she would call "truth-telling") films, and the Council for National Policy to produce materials that revealed the Marxist–Leninist orientation of the Sandanista movement.

Among the groups that participated in the Outreach Group effort was the AFL-CIO because "the Sandinistas were against free labor unions." Special Assistant to the President for National Security Affairs Constantine Menges cited "the very effective public outreach staff headed by Ambassador Faith Whittlesey" in his reflections on Reagan foreign policy.

Despite its effectiveness, Whittlesey says the Outreach Group was shut down in 1985 when Donald Regan took over as Chief of Staff and the White House "started the brown bag operation with Ollie North. What we were doing was completely open and above board. It was an honest effort to change minds and hearts and to provide a forum for truth telling". According to Whittlesey, "the Washington establishment, especially Democratic but also most of the Republican, was opposed to, wanted to downplay, or gave the silent treatment to Reagan's Central American anti-communist policies."

Later, when asked about Iran-Contra she said: "I had no knowledge of the Iran-Contras connection. I had no involvement in it, nor was I asked to be a part of it." The final House report on Iran-Contra concluded that Whittlesey unsuccessfully attempted to help Oliver North obtain a U.S. passport for a fake Saudi prince who claimed to have knowledge of the locations of hostages being held in Lebanon.

Whittlesey emphatically denied the claim, for which she maintained no proof was produced, as a politically motivated attempt by a Democrat-dominated House to discredit her White House Outreach Group initiative, which had been "a legitimate and in every respect legal attempt to communicate Reagan's anti-communist policy in Central America."

Of her association with Oliver North, she asserted, "We worked closely together. That's why I was investigated. That's why I was hauled before a congressional panel and investigated. They were criminalizing policy differences."

=== Return to Switzerland ===
She resumed her duties representing the U.S. in Bern for a second term in 1985.

After the Democrats took control of the Senate in 1986, giving them control of both Houses of Congress, allegations were made to Attorney General Edwin Meese that Whittlesey had granted diplomatic favors for private contributions to her State Department-administered representational fund and that she had also obstructed justice. Meese "found no 'reasonable grounds' to pursue allegations that", in contravention of the independent counsel statute, Whittlesey had "mishandled entertainment funds at the embassy or improperly aided contributors to the funds".

Hearings into the claims were held by a House Foreign Affairs subcommittee, but the hearings failed to produce substantiation of the charges. Whittlesey resigned as ambassador in 1988.

=== Post-government career ===
After leaving Switzerland, Whittlesey joined the New York-based law firm of Myerson & Kuhn until its 1990 bankruptcy filing She also served as president of the American Swiss Foundation.

Whittlesey's diplomatic career resumed briefly in 2001 when she was named by President George W. Bush to be an At-Large Member of the U.S. Delegation to the United Nations Conference on the Illicit Trade in Small Arms and Light Weapons in All Its Aspects.

She also founded a consulting firm, Maybrook Associates. She served on several corporate boards, including the U.S. Advisory Board for Nestle. From 1989 through 2012 she served as a board member of Schindler Elevator Corporation. She also served on the board of directors of Christian Freedom International, an organization dedicated to assisting persecuted Christians around the world. For several years she served on the Newsmax International Advisory Board. In 2016, she became a member of the Diplomatic Advisory Board and Special Advisors to the World War I Centennial Commission. On June 17–18, 2017, she participated as a judge of the 2017 Miss District of Columbia Pageant, part of the Miss America competition.

=== Involvement in Russia-Trump affair ===
She arranged for convicted Russian spy Maria Butina to meet Jeffrey Gordon on September 29, 2016, at the Swiss Ambassador's residence. and later, in October 2016, attended J. D. Gordon's birthday party with Butina. (Note: Aleksandr Torshin, a close ally of Vladimir Putin and known as "The Godfather" by the convicted Russian money launderer Aleksandr Romanov, is the suspected Russian handler for Butina and had travelled extensively to the United States to meet with United States conservatives before and after the 2016 United States elections.)

== Personal life ==
In 1963, she married Roger Weaver Whittlesey of Huntingdon Valley, Pennsylvania. Whittlesey was an advertising executive. They had three children and ten grandchildren. The marriage lasted 11 years, not ending until Roger Whittlesey committed suicide in March 1974. Their son Henry, who was subject to depression, committed suicide in 2012.

An enthusiastic gardener, Whittlesey was presented with a new Tea Rose variety named Faith Whittlesey for her. Whittlesey was also an accomplished classical pianist.

== Death ==
Faith Whittlesey died in Washington on May 21, 2018, aged 79, of cancer.

== Writings about and by Whittlesey ==
=== Quotations ===
- Regarded as a "conviction conservative", Whittlesey described Reagan's core agenda as "support for the peaceful defeat of the Soviet Union without commitment of U.S. troops in combat, defense of life, opposition to the Equal Rights Amendment with its hidden agenda of tax-funded abortion and same-sex marriage, decentralized government, lower taxes and reduced government regulation of the private sector, school prayer, defeat of Marxism-Leninism in its various permutations and manifestations, individual Second Amendment rights, the establishment of official diplomatic recognition of the Vatican, support for tuition tax credits for parochial schooling."
- When working in the Liaison Office she declared that feminism was a "straitjacket" for women because she believed it reduced rather than enhanced legal rights women had previously enjoyed in child custody and marital support cases before states enacted versions of the Equal Rights Amendment. She declared, "Ronald Reagan honored the role of full-time homemaker and her rights in Social Security and income tax in the face of elite feminists' demeaning of full-time mothers."
- In 1985, when looking at the trendline that showed that half of all pre-school children had mothers in the workforce, she assured Reagan that once the economy picked up "all those women can go home and look after their own children."
- In 1984, Whittlesey popularized a quote about Ginger Rogers and Fred Astaire that is often attributed to her: "Ginger Rogers did everything Fred Astaire did, except backwards and in high heels". The official Ginger Rogers website attributes the origin of the quote to Bob Thaves who wrote in a 1982 Frank and Ernest comic strip about Fred Astaire: "Sure he was great, but don't forget that Ginger Rogers did everything he did, backwards… and in high heels."
- Whittlesey was fond of quoting John Quincy Adams' cautionary admonition to America about foreign entanglements and war: "We do not go abroad for monsters to destroy."
- Before crowd at the Institute of World Politics in Washington, D.C., on October 5, 2012, Whittlesey said, "Listen carefully, read widely, listen to diverse opinions, and be somewhat humble about yourself and our country."

=== Books and forewords ===
- Thomas Carty, Backwards in High Heels: Reagan's Madam Ambassador in Switzerland and the West Wing (Casemate Publishing, Philadelphia & Oxford, 2012); ISBN 9781612001593
- Soviet global strategy and the Caribbean: America by the throat? , Rockford Institute, 1984; OCLC 30844100
- Faith Whittlesey, Edson I. Gaylord. Straight talk on the economy: The capital goods industry between the great depressions of the 1930s and the 1980s, Rockford Institute, 1984; OCLC 30844105
- Sustainable Rose Garden: Exploring 21st Century Environmental Rose Gardening edited by Pat Shanley & Peter Kukielski, foreword by Faith Whittlesey (Manhattan Rose Society Publications, 2008)
- Switzerland under siege, 1939-1945 : a neutral nation's struggle for survival edited by Leo Schelbert, foreword by Faith Whittlesey (Picton Press, 2000); ISBN 0-89725-414-7

=== Articles ===
- Faith Whittlesey (March 1, 2009) "America must treat its Swiss friend with care," Financial Times, Retrieved July 27, 2009
- Faith Whittlesey (April 18, 2016) "Commentary: Like Reagan, Trump Serious About Security," The Philadelphia Inquirer, Retrieved June 7, 2018
- Faith Whittlesey (May 12, 2016) "Hillary's Hawkishness Out of Sync with Women's Concerns," HuffPost, Retrieved June 7, 2018
- Faith Whittlesey (May 20, 2016) "Answer to General Petraeus and Others Seeking to Cut Off Candid Discussion," HuffPost, Retrieved June 7, 2018
- Faith Whittlesey (June 28, 2016) "President Reagan and Young Mr. Trump," HuffPost, Retrieved June 7, 2018
- Faith Whittlesey (July 6, 2016) "NEVER: They Said That of Ronald Reagan in 1980, Too," HuffPost, Retrieved June 7, 2018
- Faith Whittlesey (July 29, 2016) "Press 'Spins' DNC Scandal to Divert Attention from Hillary Campaign Offenses: Another Case of Special Treatment," HuffPost, Retrieved June 7, 2018
- Faith Whittlesey (August 15, 2016) "Regarding the Letter in The New York Times from 50 Republican 'Endless War' Policy Advocates," HuffPost, Retrieved June 7, 2018
- Faith Whittlesey and Patrick Gleason (January 26, 2017) "'Mr. Apprentice' Can Look to Switzerland for a Model to Help Close U.S. Youth Skills Gap," Forbes, Retrieved June 7, 2018

=== Collected papers ===
Whittlesey's Collected Papers are housed at the Howard Gotlieb Archival Research Center, Boston University.

== Notes ==
Diplomatic posts
Preceded by Richard Vine	United States Ambassador to Switzerland; 1981–1983	Succeeded by John Lodge
Preceded by John Lodge	United States Ambassador to Switzerland; 1985–1988	Succeeded by Philip Winn
Political offices
Preceded by Elizabeth Dole	Director of the Office of Public Liaison; 1983–1985	Succeeded by Linda Chavez
