= National Laboratory of the Rockies =

United States national laboratory

Coordinates: 39.74068°N 105.17300°W

National Lab of the Rockies

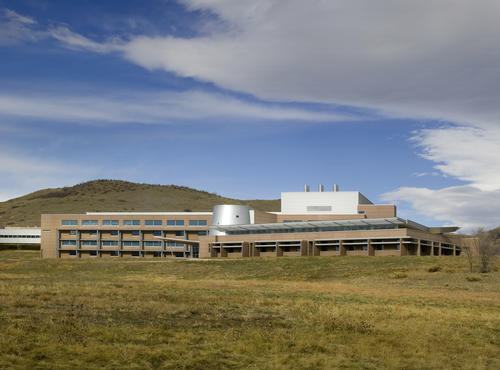
- Former name: National Renewable Energy Laboratory (NREL), Solar Energy Research Institute (SERI)
- Motto: Transforming Energy
- Established: 1977; 49 years ago
- Research type: Energy Efficiency & Renewable Energy
- Budget: $1.1 billion (FY 25)
- Director: Jud Virden
- Staff: 3,675 employees, postdoctoral researchers, interns, visiting professionals, and subcontractors
- Location: Golden, Colorado
- Affiliations: United States Department of Energy
- Operating agency: Alliance for Sustainable Energy, LLC
- Website: nlr.gov

The National Laboratory of the Rockies (NLR), formerly the National Renewable Energy Laboratory (NREL), in the United States specializes in the research and development of renewable energy, energy efficiency, energy systems integration, and sustainable transportation. NREL is a federally funded research and development center sponsored by the Department of Energy and operated by the Alliance for Sustainable Energy, a joint venture between MRIGlobal and Battelle. Located in Golden, Colorado, NREL is home to the National Center for Photovoltaics, the National Bioenergy Center, and the National Wind Technology Center. On December 1, 2025, the Department of Energy announced a new name for NREL, the National Laboratory of the Rockies, pending Congressional authorization.

== History ==
=== Establishment ===
During the 1973 oil crisis, soaring energy prices caused gasoline shortages and contributed significantly to inflation. U.S. president Gerald Ford openly recognized the need for greater energy independence at the September 1974 World Energy Conference in Detroit. A month later, the Solar Energy Research, Development and Demonstration Act of 1974 was signed. Section 10 of the bill explicitly outlined the establishment of the Solar Energy Research Institute, which opened in 1977 and was operated by Midwest Research Institute. Paul Rappaport was the founding director. It was the first time a national-scale effort had ever been made to advance solar power.

=== Before 1991 ===
SERI's activities went beyond research and development in solar energy as it tried to popularize knowledge about already existing technologies, like biomass conversion, passive solar, and energy storage. During the first year of operation, thin-film solar cells achieved 10% efficiency. The next year, the Jimmy Carter administration passed the Solar Photovoltaic Energy Research, Development, and Demonstration Act of 1978. However, by this time, the national effort for an alternative energy source had turned towards nuclear energy. In 1979, Three Mile Island accident occurred, renewing a public interest in alternative renewable solutions, including solar energy.

=== 1991–present ===
In September 1991, the institute was designated a national laboratory of the U.S. Department of Energy by President George H. W. Bush, and its name was changed to the National Renewable Energy Laboratory.

Renewed interest in energy problems improved the laboratory's position, but funding has fluctuated over the years. In 2011, anticipated congressional budget shortfalls led to a voluntary buyout program for 100 to 150 staff reductions, and in 2015 budget cuts led to staff layoffs and further buyouts.

Martin Keller became NREL's ninth director in November 2015, and currently serves as both the director of the laboratory and the president of its operating contractor, Alliance for Sustainable Energy, LLC. He succeeded Dan Arvizu, who retired in September 2015 after 10 years in those roles.

On December 1, 2025, the US Department of Energy changed the laboratory's name from "National Renewable Energy Laboratory" to "National Laboratory of the Rockies", stating that the new name "reflects laboratory’s expanding mission under the Trump Administration".

== Department of Energy funding ==
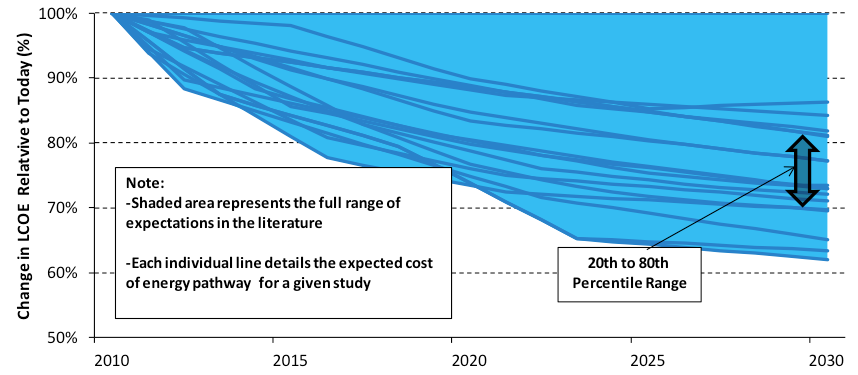
The National Renewable Energy Laboratory projects that the levelized cost of wind power will decline about 25% from 2012 to 2030.

In fiscal year 2020, congressional appropriations for the Department of Energy contained $464.3 million for NREL. This total included the following amounts for its renewable energy technology programs:

- Solar energy: $122.4 million
- Wind power: $30.0 million
- Bioenergy: $56.3 million
- Hydrogen and fuel cells: $17.6 million
- Geothermal: $1.8 million
- Hydropower: $15.8 million

== Commercialization and technology transfer ==
The National Renewable Energy Laboratory (NREL) engages in technology transfer, working with private sector partners to facilitate the application of research in renewable energy and energy efficiency technologies in practical settings.

In recognition of its efforts in innovation and technology transfer, NREL has received numerous R&D 100 Awards. These awards acknowledge advancements in scientific research with potential market applications. Additionally, NREL offers an external user access program. This program is designed to enable researchers from outside the laboratory to utilize the Energy Systems Integration Facility (ESIF), providing them with an opportunity to collaborate with NREL's staff in the development and evaluation of energy technologies.

== National Center for Photovoltaics ==
The goal of the photovoltaics (PV) research done at NREL is to decrease the "nation's reliance on fossil-fuel generated electricity by lowering the cost of delivered electricity and improving the efficiency of PV modules and systems."

Photovoltaic research at NREL is performed under the National Center for Photovoltaics (NCPV). A primary mission of the NCPV is to support ongoing efforts of the DOE's SunShot Initiative, which wants to increase the availability of solar power at a cost competitive with other energy sources. The NCPV coordinates its research and goals with researchers from across the country, including the Quantum Energy and Sustainable Solar Technologies (QESST) Center and the Bay Area PV Consortium. NCPV also partners with many universities and other industry partners. NREL brings in dozens of students annually through the Solar University-National lab Ultra-effective Program (SUN UP), which was created to facilitate existing and new interactions between universities and the laboratory.

The lab maintains a number of research partnerships for PV research.

=== Research and development ===
Some of the areas of PV R&D include the physical properties of PV panels, performance and reliability of PV, junction formation, and research into photo-electrochemical materials.

Through this research, NREL hopes to surpass current technologies in efficiency and cost-competitiveness and reach the overall goal of generating electricity at $0.06/kWh for grid-tied PV systems.

NREL identifies the following as cornerstones to its PV R&D program: the Thin-Film Partnership and the PV Manufacturing R&D Project.

The Thin Film Partnership Program at NREL coordinates national research teams of manufacturers, academics, and NREL scientists on a variety of subjects relating to thin-film PV. The research areas of the Thin Film Partnership Program include amorphous silicon (a-Si), copper indium diselenide (CuInSe2 or CIGS) and, cadmium telluride (CdTe), and module reliability.

NREL's PV Manufacturing Research and Development Project is an ongoing partnership between NREL and private sector solar manufacturing companies. It started in 1991 as the Photovoltaic Manufacturing Technology (PVMaT) project and was extended and renamed in 2001 due to its success as a project. The overall goal of research done under the PV Manufacturing R&D Project is to help maintain a strong market position for US solar companies by researching ways to reduce costs to manufacturers and customers and improving the manufacturing process. It is estimated that the project has helped to reduce manufacturing cost for PV panels by more than 50%.

Examples of achievements under the PV Manufacturing Research and Development Project include the development of a manufacturing process that increase the production of silicon solar modules by 8% without increasing costs and the development of a new boron coating process that reduces solar costs over traditional processes.

=== Testing ===
NREL is capable of providing testing and evaluation to the PV industry with indoor, outdoor, and field testing facilities. NREL is able to provide testing on long-term performance, reliability, and component failure for PV systems. NREL also has accelerated testing capabilities from both PV cells and system components to identify areas of potential long-term degradation and failure. The Photovoltaic Device Performance group at NREL is able to measure the performance of PV cells and modules with regard to a standard or customized reference set. This allows NREL to serve as independent facility for verifying device performance. NREL allows industry members to test and evaluate potential products, with the hope that it will lead to more cost effective and reliable technology. The overall goal is to help improve the reliability in the PV industry.

=== Deployment ===
NREL also seeks to raise public awareness of PV technologies through its deployment services. NREL provides a number of technical and non-technical publications intended to help raise consumer awareness and understanding of solar PV. Scientists at NREL perform research into energy markets and how to develop the solar energy market. They also perform research and outreach in the area of building-integrated PV. NREL is also an active organizer and sponsor in the DOE's Solar Decathlon.

NREL provides information on solar energy, beyond the scientific papers on research done at the lab. The lab provides publications on solar resources and manuals on different applications of solar technology, as well as a number of different solar resource models and tools. The lab also makes available a number of different solar resource data sets in its Renewable Resource Data Center.

=== Facilities ===
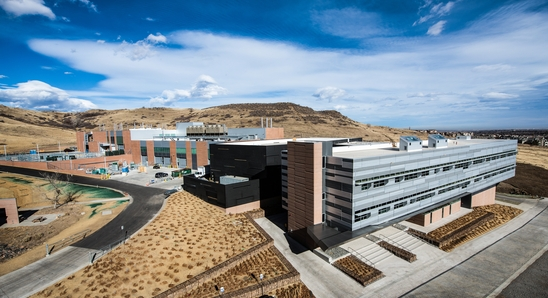
The Energy Systems Integration Facility in Golden, Colorado

NREL's Golden, Colorado campus houses several facilities dedicated to PV and biomass research. In the recently opened Science and Technology Facility, research is conducted on solar cells, thin films, and nanostructure research. NREL's Outdoor Test Facility allows researchers to test and evaluate PV technologies under a range of conditions, both indoor and outdoor. Scientists at NREL work at the Outdoor Test Facility to develop standards for testing PV technologies. At the Outdoor Test Facility NREL researchers calibrate primary reference cells for use in a range of applications. One of the main buildings for PV research at NREL is the Solar Energy Research Facility (SERF). Examples of research conducted at the SERF include semiconductor material research, prototype solar cell production, and measurement and characterization of solar cell and module performance. Additionally, the roof at the SERF is able to house ten PV panels to evaluate and analyze the performance of commercial building-integrated PV systems. Additionally, R&D in PV materials and devices, measurement and characterization, reliability testing are also conducted at the SERF. At the Solar Radiation Research Laboratory, NREL has been measuring solar radiation and meteorological data since 1984.

== National Bioenergy Center ==
The National Bioenergy Center (NBC) was established in October 2000. "The National Bioenergy Center is composed of four technical groups and a technical lead for partnership development with industry. Partnership development includes work performed at NREL under Cooperative Research and Development Agreements (CRADA), Technical Service Agreements (TSA), Analytical Service Agreements (ASA), and Work for Others (WFO) contract research for DOE's industry partners."

The main focus of the research is to convert biomass into biofuels/biochemical intermediates via both biochemical and thermochemical processes.

The National Bioenergy Center is currently divided into certain technology and research areas:

- Applied Science
- Catalysis and Thermochemical Sciences and Engineering R&D
- Biochemical Process R&D
- Biorefinery Analysis

Some of the current projects are in the following areas:

- Biomass characteristics
- Biochemical conversion
- Thermochemical conversion
- Chemical and catalyst science
- Integrated biorefinery processes
- Microalgal biofuels
- Biomass process and sustainability analysis

The Integrated Biorefinery Research Facility (IBRF) houses multiple pilot-scale process trains for converting biomass to various liquid fuels at a rate of 450–900 kg (0.5–1 ton) per day of dry biomass. Unit operations include feedstock washing and milling, pretreatment, enzymatic hydrolysis, fermentation, distillation, and solid-liquid separation. The heart of the Thermochemical Users Facility (TCUF) is the 0.5-metric-ton-per-day Thermochemical Process Development Unit (TCPDU), which can be operated in either a pyrolysis or gasification mode.

== National Wind Technology Center ==
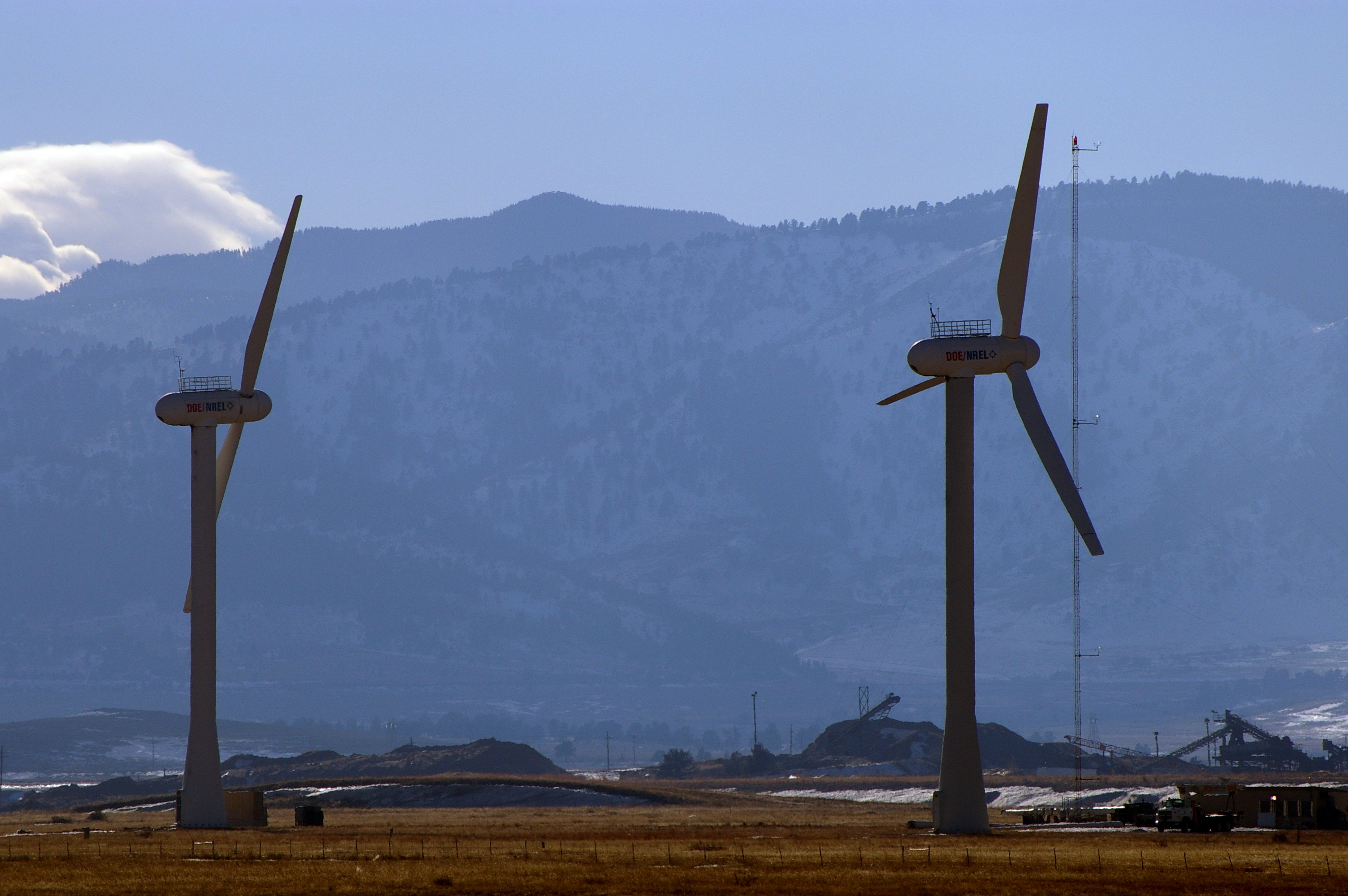
The main research wind turbines at NREL

NREL has produced many technologies that affect the wind industry at a global level. The National Wind Technology Center (NWTC) is home of 20 patents and has created software such as (FAST), simulation software that is used to model wind turbines.

The NWTC is located on NREL's Flatirons Campus, which is at the base of the foothills just south of Boulder, Colorado. The campus comprises field test sites, test laboratories, industrial high-bay work areas, machine shops, electronics and instrumentation laboratories, and office areas.

The NWTC is also home to NREL's Distributed Energy Resources Test Facility (DERTF). The DERTF is a working laboratory for interconnection and systems integration testing. This facility includes generation, storage, and interconnection technologies as well as electric power system equipment capable of simulating a real-world electric system.

The center is the first facility in the United States with a controllable grid interface test system that has fault simulation capabilities and allows manufacturers and system operators to conduct the tests required for certification in a controlled laboratory environment. It is the only system in the world that is fully integrated with two dynamometers and has the capacity to extend that integration to turbines in the field and to a matrix of electronic and mechanical storage devices, all of which are located within close proximity on the same site.

== Sustainable transportation and mobility research ==
NREL conducts research on accelerating the development of sustainable mobility technologies and strategies for passenger and freight transportation, with a focus on decarbonizing the transportation sector and combating climate change. As the only national laboratory dedicated to energy efficiency and renewable energy, NREL and its industry partners create fuels, infrastructure, integrated systems, and other components for battery electric, fuel cell, and other alternative fuel on-road, off-road, and non-road vehicles, including emerging technologies for aviation, rail, and marine applications.

NREL's integrated modeling and analysis tools help overcome technical barriers and accelerate the development of advanced transportation technologies and systems that maximize energy savings and on-road performance.

=== Transportation and mobility research areas ===
- Commercial vehicle technologies
- Transportation decarbonization
- Electric vehicle grid integration
- Energy storage
- Fuels and combustion
- Intelligent vehicle energy analysis
- Mobility behavioral science
- Power electronics and electric machines
- Sustainable aviation
- Sustainable mobility
- Vehicle technology integration
- Vehicle thermal management

== Directors ==
The following persons served as director of the National Renewable Energy Laboratory or its predecessor, Solar Energy Research Institute:

No.	Image	Director	Term start	Term end	Refs.
1		Paul Rappaport	July 5, 1977	1979	
2		Denis Hayes	1979	1981	
3		Harold Hubbard	1981	1989	
4		Gene Mannella	1989	1990	
5		Duane Sunderman	1990	1994	
6		Charles Gay	1994	1997	
7		Richard H. Truly	May 1997	2004	
8		Dan Arvizu	January 15, 2005	September 30, 2015	
9		Martin Keller	November 30, 2015	2025	
10		Jud Virden	October 1, 2025	present	

== See also ==
- List of renewable energy organizations
- Renewable energy
- Renewable energy in the United States
- Simple Model of the Atmospheric Radiative Transfer of Sunshine (SMARTS), software published by NREL
