= Planet Lockdown =

2020 conspiracy theory video

- Directed by: James Patrick
- Starring: Catherine Austin Fitts
- Release date: December 2020
- Running time: 90 minutes
- Language: English

Planet Lockdown is a film containing misinformation about COVID-19 that was banned on YouTube and Facebook.

The film's producers describe it as a documentary.

== Production ==
The 90-minute film was directed by James Patrick, and released online in December 2020. In addition to being shared on social media, the video was released on the Planet Lockdown website. The video's producers describe it as a documentary. A feature-length cut of the film premiered on November 20, 2021 at an event hosted by the Arlington Institute at Coolfont Resort in Berkeley Springs, West Virginia.

== Synopsis ==
Planet Lockdown presents a wide range of falsehoods about COVID-19, including incorrect statements linking COVID-19 and human infertility, and misinformation alleging that vaccines contain microchips. The film also perpetuates myths about voter fraud during the 2020 United States presidential election.

The film includes an interview with Catherine Austin Fitts in which she shares her view that a global committee is engaged in mind control efforts, led by a character she identifies as Mr Global. Fitts also shares falsehoods that COVID-19 vaccines contain unknown ingredients. In addition to incorrectly stating that the COVID-19 is not real, Fitts also shares political conspiracy theories about electoral fraud during the 2020 U.S. presidential election. Other interviewees include QAnon supporting physician Carrie Madej, lawyer Markus Haintz, and COVID-19 herd-immunity supporting epidemiologist Knut Wittkowski.

== Critical reception ==
In late 2020 and early 2021, the video was shared over 20 million times on Facebook and YouTube. Notable promoters of the video include Robert F. Kennedy Jr.

After a February analysis of the video by Media Matters for America, TikTok, Facebook and YouTube started removing the video from their platforms and GoFundMe removed a fundraising page to cover production costs.

Vice News described the video as "almost a carbon copy" of the 2020 conspiracy theory video Plandemic.

== See also ==
- COVID-19 misinformation
