= Samuel Pierce =

American lawyer and politician (1922–2000)

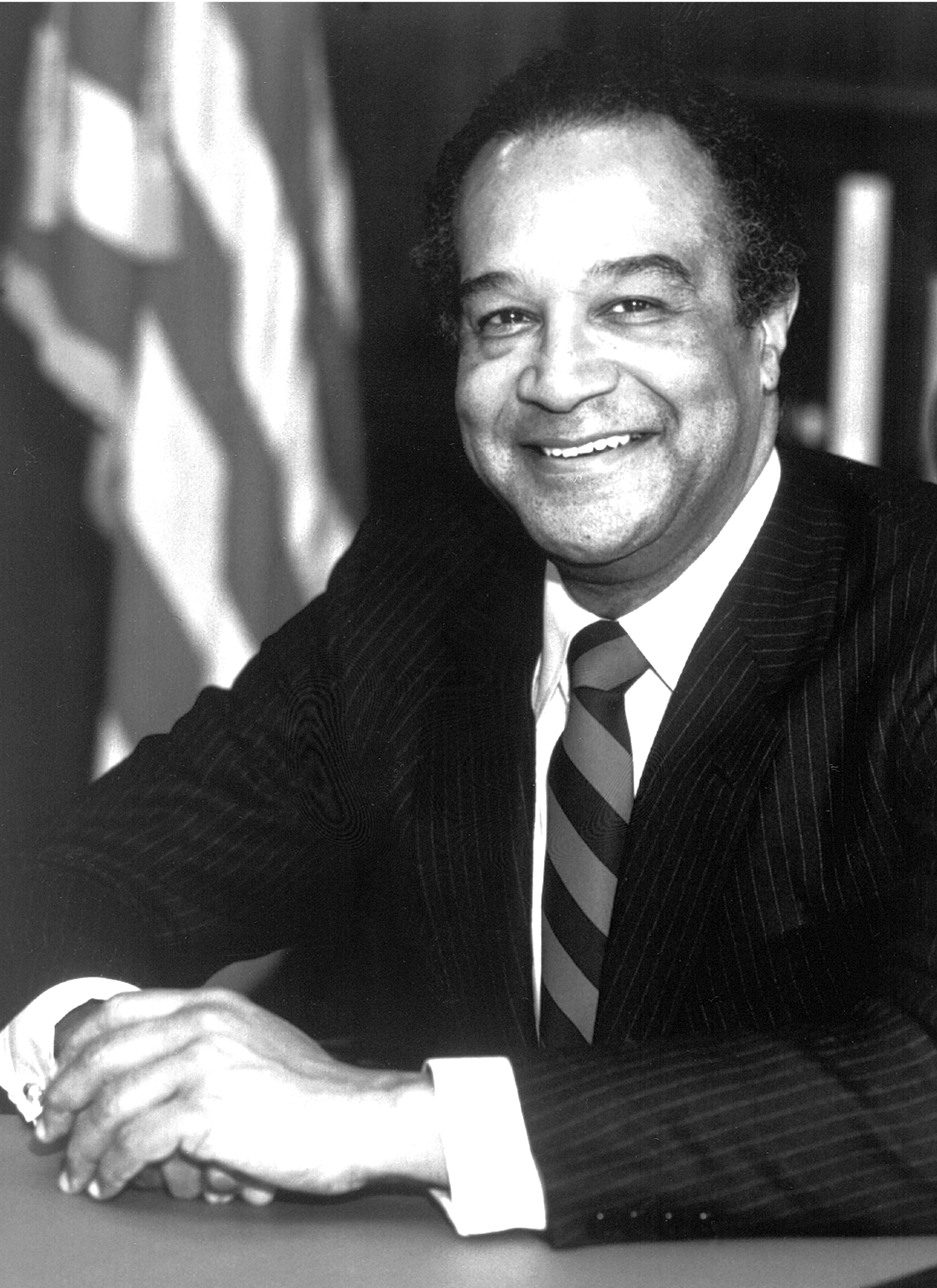

8th United States Secretary of Housing and Urban Development
- In office January 23, 1981 – January 20, 1989
- President: Ronald Reagan
- Preceded by: Moon Landrieu
- Succeeded by: Jack Kemp

Personal details
- Born: Samuel Riley Pierce Jr. September 8, 1922 Glen Cove, New York, U.S.
- Died: October 31, 2000 (aged 78) Silver Spring, Maryland, U.S.
- Party: Republican
- Spouse: Barbara Penn Wright
- Children: 1
- Education: Cornell University (BA, JD); New York University (LLM)

Military service
- Allegiance: United States
- Branch/service: United States Army
- Unit: Criminal Investigation Division
- Battles/wars: World War II

Samuel Riley Pierce Jr. (September 8, 1922 – October 31, 2000) was an American attorney and politician who served as the 8th United States secretary of housing and urban development from 1981 to 1989 during the administration of Ronald Reagan. He holds the record as the longest-serving secretary of housing and urban development.

== Early life ==
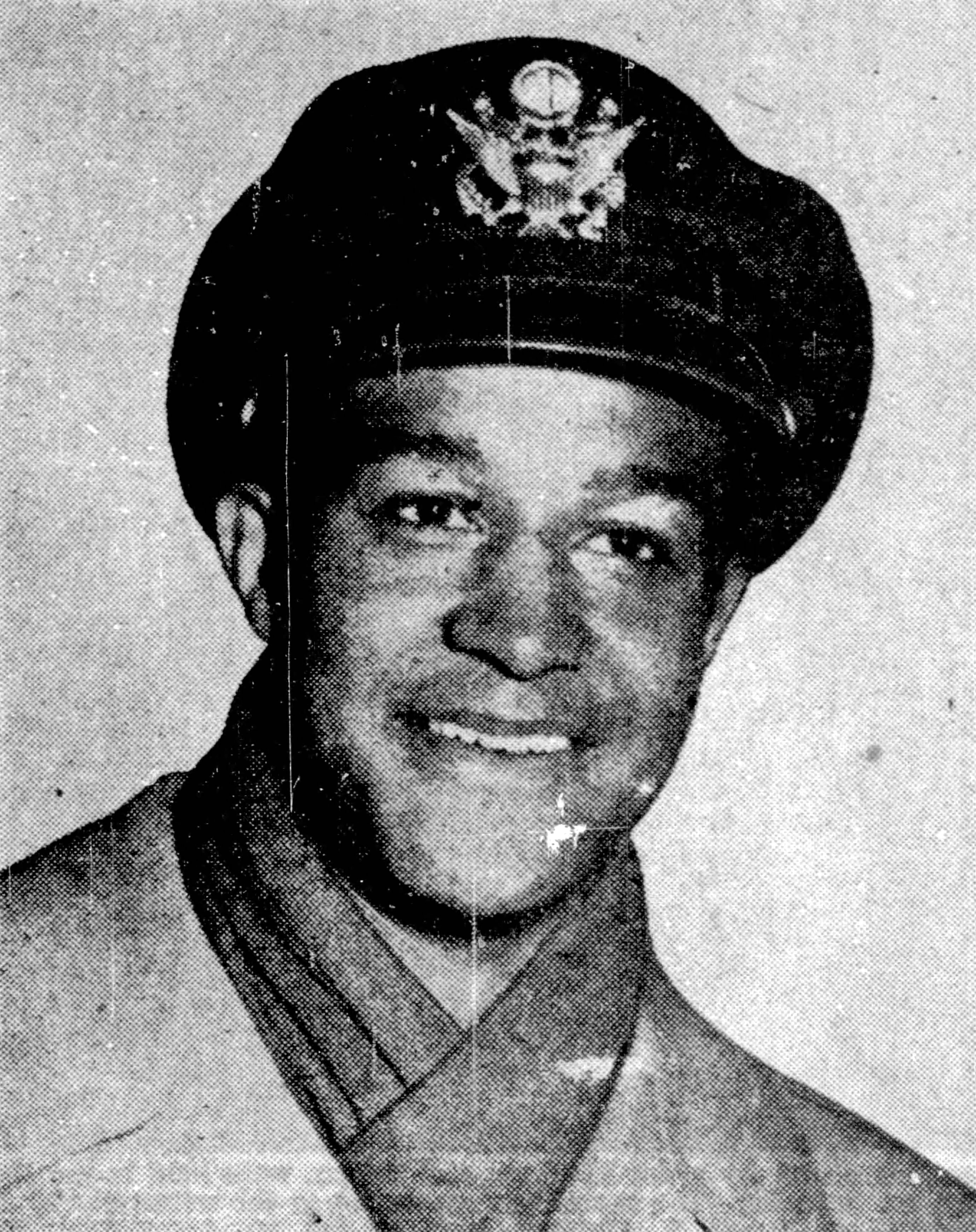
Special Agent Pierce in the Baltimore Afro-American, April 13, 1946

Pierce Jr. was born and grew up in Glen Cove, New York. His father, also Samuel Pierce, came from Virginia to New York as a young man in 1899 during the early years of the Great Migration of Black Americans who were fleeing Jim Crow laws and poor economic opportunities. (Note: The news article misspells Pierce as 'Pearce.' It is written in a racist tone, but cited nevertheless for the factual content.) Pierce (senior) worked at the Nassau Country Club, on Long Island, for over forty years.

Pierce (Jr.) was an Eagle Scout and recipient of the Distinguished Eagle Scout Award from the Boy Scouts of America. Pierce was a member of Alpha Phi Alpha fraternity and Alpha Phi Omega service fraternity. He was also elected to Cornell's oldest senior honor society, the Sphinx Head Society. He was a member of the New York Young Republican Club.

Pierce served in the United States Army's Criminal Investigation Division during World War II. Pierce graduated from Cornell University in 1947 and received a Juris Doctor degree from Cornell Law School in 1949. He earned a master of laws degree from New York University School of Law in 1952.

== Political career ==
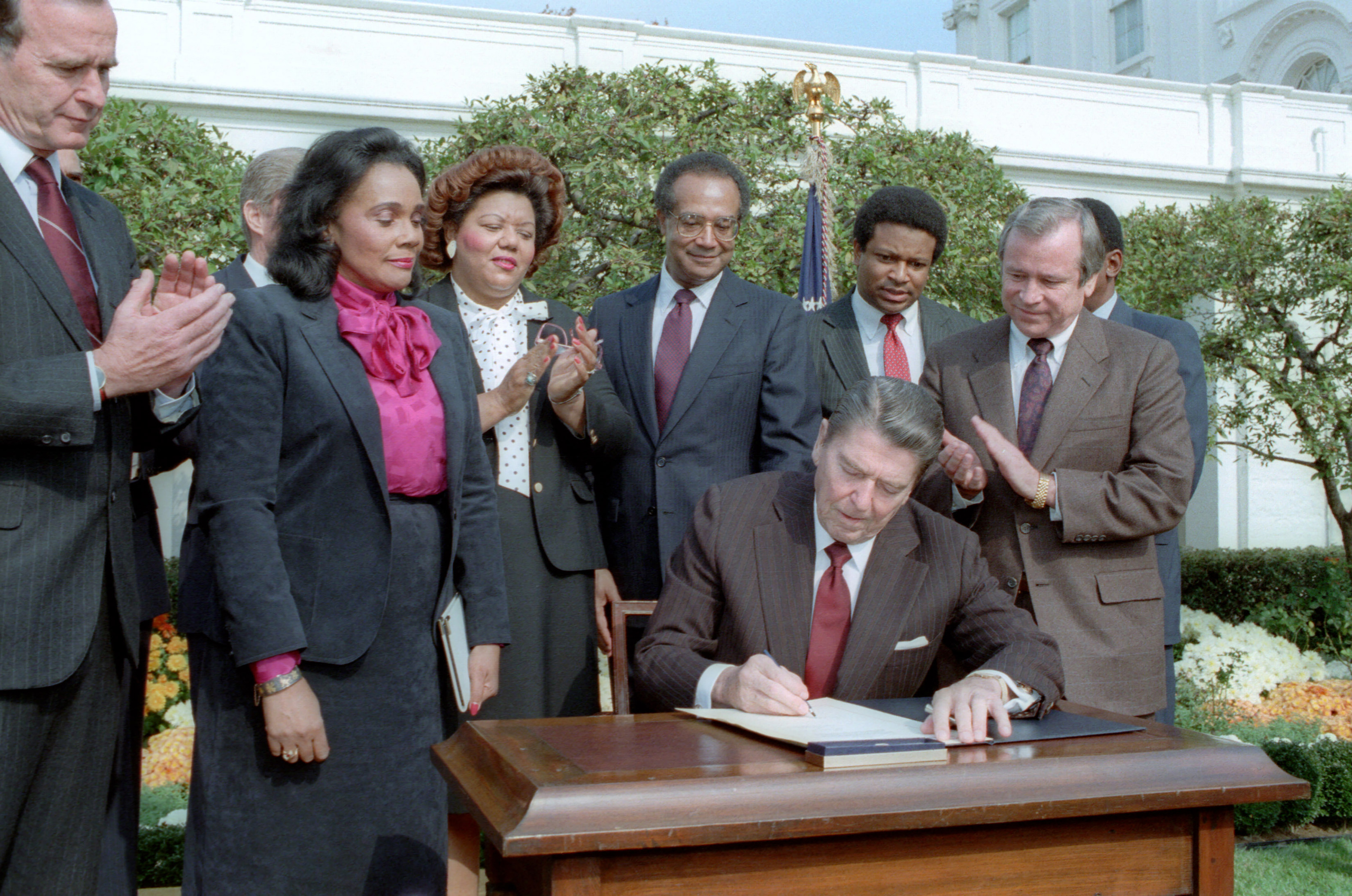
President Ronald Reagan signs Martin Luther King Jr. Day into law in the Rose Garden as Coretta Scott King (second from left), Pierce (fourth from left) and others look on, November 2, 1983

Pierce was an assistant United States attorney in New York from 1953 to 1955. A lifelong Republican, he first entered government when Eisenhower was president. He became an assistant to the Undersecretary of Labor in 1955. Pierce was appointed by Governor Nelson Rockefeller to serve as a judge of the New York City Court of General Sessions, 1959–1960. While serving in that position, he appeared on the popular game show What's My Line?. Pierce was named a partner of the law firm of Battle Fowler in 1961, the first African-American partner of a major New York firm, and was there until 1981 except for a period from 1970 through 1973 when—during the Nixon presidency—he was general counsel for the Department of the Treasury. Pierce argued before the United States Supreme Court on behalf of Martin Luther King Jr. and the New York Times in the important First Amendment case styled New York Times v. Sullivan.

In 1981, Pierce became Secretary of Housing and Urban Development under Ronald Reagan. Pierce was Reagan's only African-American Cabinet member and the only cabinet member to serve in his post throughout both of Reagan's terms as President. On June 18, 1981 during a luncheon for the US Conference of Mayors in Washington DC, President Reagan mistook Pierce for one of the mayors on the dais, infamously greeting him, "Hello, Mr. Mayor." Due to his perceived low profile within the Reagan administration, he was sometimes derided as "Silent Sam." During Pierce's tenure, HUD appropriations for low-income housing were cut by nearly half and funding all but ended for new housing construction. According to several former aides and HUD employees, Pierce, uninterested in his job, would often delegate important decisions to advisors and would watch television in his office.

== Political scandal ==
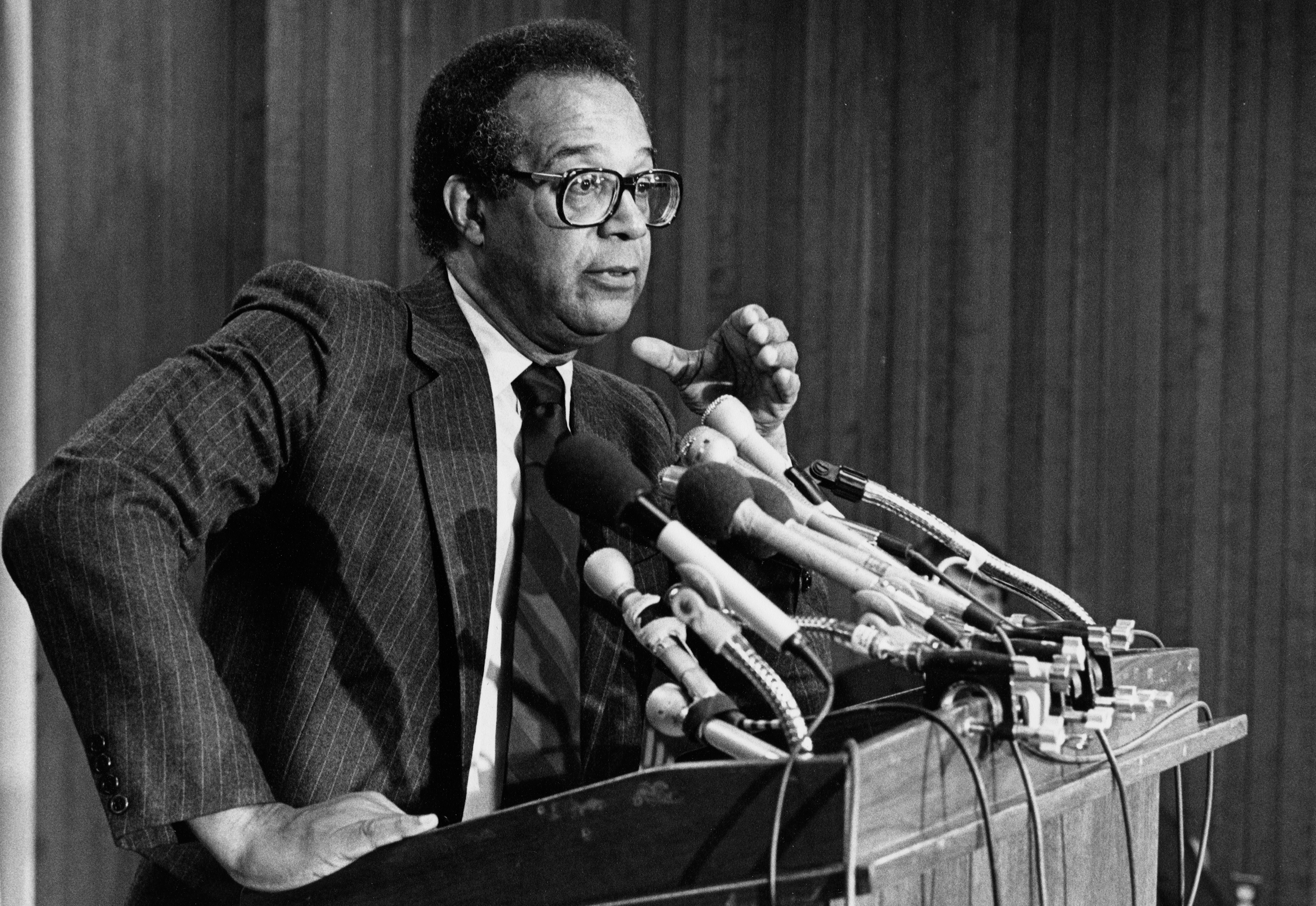
Pierce at a press conference, undated

After leaving office, he was investigated by the United States Office of the Independent Counsel and the United States Congress over mismanagement, abuse and political favoritism that took place in the department during his tenure, but not personally charged. The investigation found that under Pierce's stewardship the department engaged in political favoritism and trading of influence. Millions of dollars of federal government money was given to projects sought by connected politicians of both parties, in violation of rules governing such grants and expenditures. Through the 1990s many of Pierce's closest aides and confidants at the department were charged and convicted on felony charges related to the political favoritism and inappropriate expenditures that pervaded the department during Pierce's tenure (Thomas Demery, Phillip Winn, Joseph Strauss and Deborah Gore Dean).

== Death ==
Pierce died at the Holy Cross Hospital outside Washington, D.C., on October 31, 2000, at the age of 78.

== See also ==
- List of African-American United States Cabinet members

== Notes ==
Political offices
Preceded by Moon Landrieu	United States Secretary of Housing and Urban Development; 1981–1989	Succeeded by Jack Kemp
