= William C. Apgar =

American economist

William Apgar
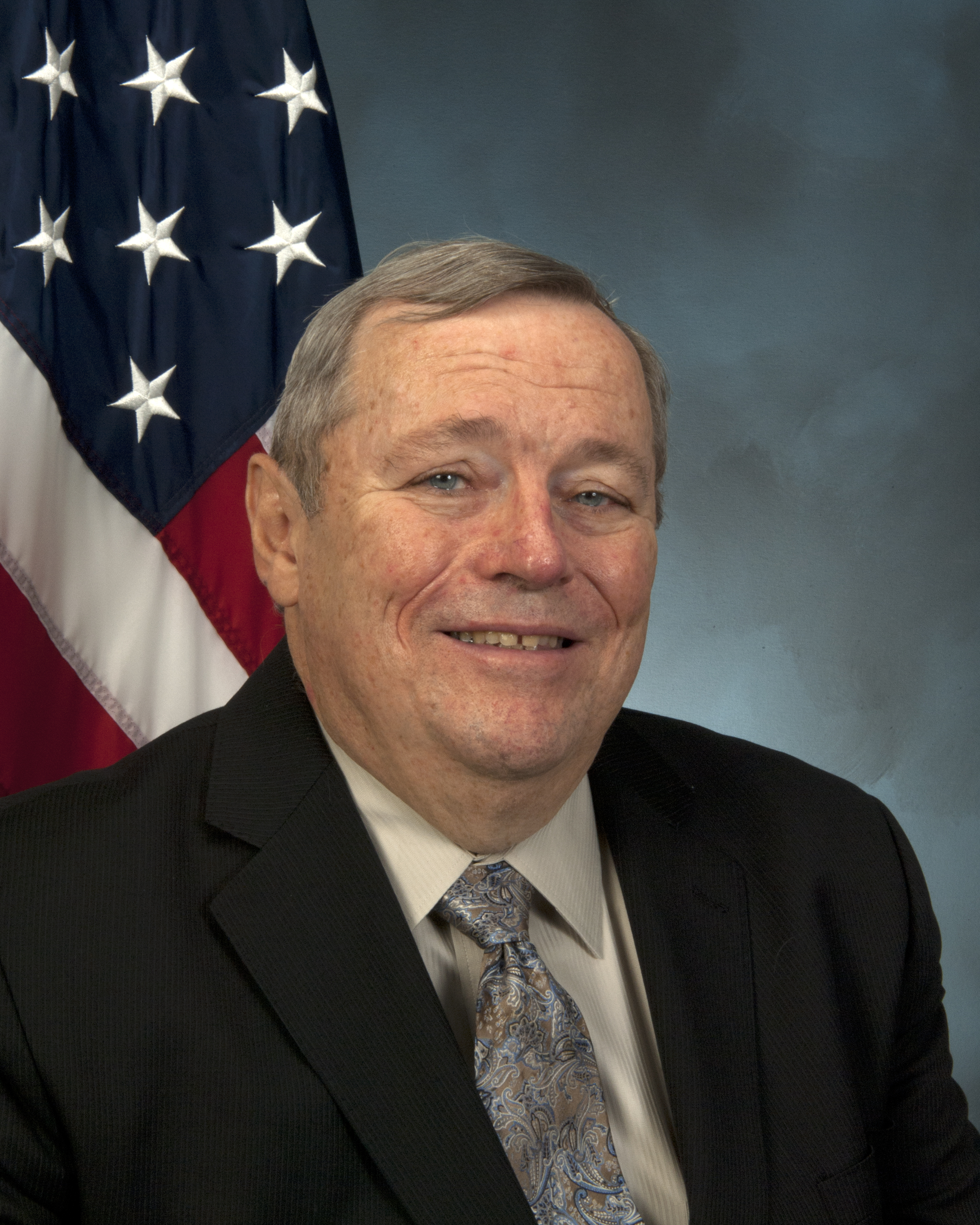

Assistant Secretary of Housing and Urban Development for Housing
- In office March 1998 – January 20, 2001
- President: Bill Clinton
- Preceded by: Nicolas P. Retsinas
- Succeeded by: John Weicher

Personal details
- Party: Democratic
- Education: Williams College (BA); Harvard University (MA, PhD)

William C. Apgar is an American economist who served as United States Assistant Secretary of Housing and Urban Development for Housing during the presidency of Bill Clinton. Apgar graduated from Williams College and received a Ph.D. in economics from Harvard University.
