= Arthur J. Hill =

American banker

Assistant Secretary of Housing and Urban Development for Housing
- In office 1991–1993
- President: George H. W. Bush
- Preceded by: Catherine Austin Fitts
- Succeeded by: Nicolas P. Retsinas

Personal details
- Born: July 4, 1948 Jacksonville, Florida, U.S.
- Died: May 13, 1995 (aged 46) Elizabeth, New Jersey, U.S.
- Party: Republican
- Education: Florida Memorial University (B.S.); University of Florida (M.A.)

Arthur J. Hill (July 4, 1948 – May 13, 1995) was an American banker who served as Assistant Secretary of Housing and Urban Development for Housing during the presidency of George H. W. Bush.

== Early life and education ==
Arthur J. Hill was born and raised in Jacksonville, Florida, one of four children of a single mother who worked as a beautician.

He graduated from Florida Memorial University and went on to earn a Master of Arts degree in agricultural economics from the University of Florida. He also received a graduate certificate in banking from Southern Methodist University.

== Career ==
Early in his career, Hill worked in several positions in Florida banks before eventually rising to become CEO of Peoples National Bank of Commerce in Miami, where he was credited with revitalizing and recapitalizing the distressed institution. He also served on the Miami-Dade Community College Foundation investment committee, on the board of directors of the United Way of Dade County, and was a Fellow of the British-American Project for the Successor Generation.

During the 1988 United States presidential election, Hill was Florida chair of Black Republicans for Bush, served as a delegate to the Republican National Convention, and was chosen an Elector in the United States Electoral College.

Following George H.W. Bush's victory, Hill was nominated to be president of Ginnie Mae and was unanimously confirmed by the United States Senate on March 6, 1990. He assumed office six days later. Hill was subsequently appointed Assistant Secretary of Housing and Urban Development for Housing by Bush to succeed the departing Catherine Austin Fitts, holding office until the end of the Bush presidency.

== Personal life ==
Hill was described as soft-spoken. He was married to Licia Green-Hill and had two daughters.Licia Green-Hill later married Rodney Ellis of Houston, Tx.

Aged 46, Hill died of a heart attack in a hotel room in Elizabeth, New Jersey in 1995 where he had been attending a dinner of the Republican Governors Association.
