= Dana T. Wade =

American public official

Dana T. Wade is an American public official who previously served as United States Assistant Secretary of Housing and Urban Development for Housing during the first presidency of Donald Trump. She previously served as associate director of the Office of Management and Budget and as deputy staff director of the U.S. Senate Committee on Banking, Housing and Urban Affairs. As of 2021, she was an executive at real estate financer Walker & Dunlop.
