= Stephen Freind =

American politician (born 1944)

Stephen F. Freind

Member of the Pennsylvania House of Representatives from the 166th district
- In office 1976–1993
- Preceded by: Faith Ryan Whittlesey
- Succeeded by: Greg Vitali

Personal details
- Born: April 22, 1944 (age 82) Philadelphia, Pennsylvania, U.S.
- Party: Republican

Stephen F. Freind (born April 22, 1944) is a retired American politician from Pennsylvania who was a Republican member of the Pennsylvania House of Representatives for the 166th district from 1976 until 1993. He unsuccessfully challenged Arlen Specter in the 1992 Republican primary election. He authored the Abortion Control Act of 1982, a law that includes, with some exceptions, "requirements that a married woman notify her husband, that there be a 24-hour wait before any abortion, and that doctors show patients a pamphlet with pictures of developing fetuses", as well as another law to prevent suits against doctors for wrongful birth or wrongful life for not giving information about risk of fetal abnormalities. The Abortion Control Act was mostly upheld by the Supreme Court of the United States except for the spousal notification provision in the case of Planned Parenthood v. Casey.

In 1988, Freind provoked controversy by claiming that it is "almost impossible" for a woman to become pregnant through rape, as it causes her to "secrete a certain secretion, which has a tendency to kill sperm".

In 1984, a bill drafted by Freind was enacted into law that changed the way adults who were adopted as children access their original birth certificates. This became Act 195 of 1984 or Adoption Act of 1984. This act is a lesser-known component of Freind's abortion agenda. Freind was convinced that denying adult adoptees access to their original birth certificates would lower abortion rates. As of February 2025, only 15 states allow adult adoptees unrestricted access to request and obtain a copy of their original birth certificate.

== Early life and education ==
Freind was born in Philadelphia, Pennsylvania, and graduated from the Malvern Preparatory School in 1962. He received a B.A. from Villanova University in 1966 and a J.D. from Temple University Law School in 1969.

== Run for Senate ==
In 1992 Freind gave up his state house seat to challenge Arlen Specter in the Republican U.S. Senate Primary. Freind ran well to the moderate-liberal Specter's right, accusing Specter of having more in common with Democrats than Republicans. Although Specter went on to win, he had to spend a considerable amount of money to do so. This left him in a weakened position for the general election, in which he just barely defeated Democratic challenger Lynn Yeakel.

Republican primary for the United States Senate from Pennsylvania, 1992:

- Arlen Specter (inc.) - 683,118 (65.08%)
- Stephen F. Freind - 366,608 (34.92%)

== See also ==
- Henry Aldridge
- Todd Akin
- Abortion in the United States

== Books by Freind ==
- Stephen F. Freind (1987). God's Children. Beech Tree Books. ISBN 0-688-06691-7.
