= Paul Rappaport Award =

IEEE award

The Paul Rappaport Award is awarded by the IEEE Electron Devices society. It was established 1984 to commemorate the late American physicist Paul Rappaport and their accomplishments. The criteria is the best paper appearing in a fast turn around archival publication of the IEEE Electron Devices Society. The award is given the award annually and is presented presented at the IEEE EDS International Electron Devices Meeting.

== Recipients ==
The past recipients are:

Year	Recipient(s)	Paper
1982	R. Fabian Pease David B. Tuckerman	High-Performance Heat Sinking for VLS
1983	Jaroslav Hynecek	Electron-Hole Recombination Antiblooming for Virtual-Phase CCD Imager
1984	Shojiro Asai Norikazu Hashimoto Kiyoo Itoh Tokuo Kure Hideo Sunami Toru Toyabe	A Corrugated Capacitor Cell (CCC)
1985	Roger Epworth Linus A. Fetter Richard E. Howard Lawrence D. Jackel Paul M. Mankiewich Kristan S. Ralls William J. Skocpol Donald M. Tennant	Single electron switching events in nanometer-scale Si MOSFET's
1986	Ben T. Ebihara Peter Ramins	Improvements in MDC and TWT overall efficiency through the application of carbon electrode surfaces
1987	Richard B. True	Emittance and the design of beam formation, transport, and collection systems in periodically focused TWT's
1988	Diane R. Ahrendt Yeou-Chong Vladimir F. Drobny Valdis E. Garuts Robert D. Herman Eric E. Lane June S. Lee Evan E. Patton Tadanori Yamaguchi Simon Yu Todd H. Yuzuriha	Process and device performance of a high-speed double poly-Si bipolar technology using borosenic-poly process with coupling-base implant
1989	James F. Gibbons Judy L. Hoyt Clifford A. King	Bandgap and transport properties of Si/sub 1-x/Ge/sub x/ by analysis of nearly ideal Si/Si/sub 1-x/Ge/sub x//Si heterojunction bipolar transistors
1990	Khalil Najafi Kenichiro Suzuki Kensall D. Wise	A 1024-element high-performance silicon tactile imager
1991	Hiroshi Fukuda Akira Imai Shinji Okazaki Tsuneo Terasawa	New approach to resolution limit and advanced image formation techniques in optical lithography
1992	April S. Brown Linda M. Jelloian Loi D. Nguyen Mark A. Thompson	50-nm self-aligned-gate pseudomorphic AlInAs/GaInAs high electron mobility transistors
1993	Hisashi Hara Hiroshi Iwai Toyota Morimoto Masakatsu Tsuchiaki	A new charge pumping method for determining the spatial distribution of hot-carrier-induced fixed charge in p-MOSFETs
1994	Takashi Hashimoto Tomoyuki Ishii Takashi Kobayashi Fumio Murai Koichi Seki Kazuo Yano	Room-temperature single-electron memory
1995	Herbert Lifka Ger M. Paulzen Henk G. Pomp Pierre H. Woerlee Reinout Woltjer	Three Hot-Carrier Degradation Mechanisms in Deep-Submicron PMOSFETS
1996	Chris J. Diorio Paul E. Hasler Carver A. Mead Bradley A. Minch	A Single-Transistor Silicon Synapse
1997	Dimitri A. Antoniadis Anantha P. Chandrakasan Carlin J. Vieri Isabel Y. Yang	Back-Gated CMOS on SOIAS For Dynamic Threshold Voltage Control
1998	Yujun Li Tso-Ping Mai	A Front-Gate Charge-Pumping Method for Probing Both Interfaces in SOI Devices
1999	Pallab Bhattacharya Kishore K. Kamath Jasprit Singh David Klotzkin Jamie Phillips Hong-Tao Jiang Nalini Chervela Theodore B. Norris Tom Sosnowski Joy Laskar M. Ramana Murty	In (Ga)As/GaAs Self-Organized Quantum Dot Lasers: DC and Small-Signal Modulation Properties
2000	Didier Dutartre Malgorzata Jurczak Damien Lenoble Jose Martins Stephanie Monfray Roland Pantel M. Paoli Jorge Luis Regolini Pascal Ribot Thomas Skotnicki Beatrice Tormen	Silicon-on-Nothing (SON)--an Innovative Process for Advanced CMOS
2001	Ioannis Kymissis Christos D. Dimitrakopoulos Sampath Purusothaman	High Performance Bottom Electrode Organic Thin-Film Transistors
2001	Raymond M. Warner, Jr.	Microelectronics: Its Unusual Origin and Personality
2002	Yee Chia Yeo Vivek Subramanian Jakub Kedzierski Peiqi Xuan Tsu-Jae King Jeffrey Bokor Chenming Hu	Design & Fabrication of 50-nm Thin-Body p-MOSFETS with a Silicon-Germanium Heterostructure Channel
2003	Ken Uchida Junji Koga Ryuji Ohba Akira Toriumi	Programmable Single-Electron Transistor Logic for future Low-Power Intelligent LSI : Proposal and Room-Temperature Operation
2004	Franco Stellari Peilin Song James C. Tsang Moyra K. McManus Mark B. Ketchen	Testing and Diagnostics of CMOS Circuits Using Light Emission from Off-State Leakage Current
2005	Kailash Gopalakrishnan Peter B. Griffin James D. Plummer Raymond Wood Christoph Jungemann	Impact Ionization MOS (I-MOS) - Part I: Device and Circuit Simulations and Part II: Experimental Results
2006	Billy Lau Alfred Forchel Lukas Worschech David Hartmann	Cascaded Quantum Wires and Integrated Design for Complex Logic Functions: Nanoelectronic Full Adder
2007	Azad Naeemi James D. Meindl	Design and Performance Modeling for Single-Walled Carbon Nanotubes as Local, Semiglobal, and Global Interconnects in Gigascale Integrated Systems
2008	Kah-Wee Ang Jian Qiang Lin Ganesh S. Samudra Shih-Hang Tung Narayanan Balasumbramanian Yee-Chia Yeo	Strained n-MOSFET With Embedded Source/Drain Stressors and Strain-Transfer Structure (STS) for Enhanced Transistor Performance
2009	Takao Someya Tsuyoshi Sekitani Koichiro Zaitsu Yoshiaki Noguchi Kiyoshiro Ishibe Makoto Takamiya Takayasu Sakurai	Printed Nonvolatile Memory for a Sheet-Type Communication System
2010	Yusaku Kato Tsuyoshi Sekitani Yoshiaki Noguchi Tomoyuki Yokota Makoto Takamiya Takayasu Sakurai Takao Someya	Large-Area Flexible Ultrasonic Imaging System With an Organic-Transistor Active Matrix
2011	Tibor Grasser Ben Kaczer Wolfgang Goes Hans Reisinger Thomas Aichinger Philipp Hehenberger Paul-JÃ¼rgen Wagner Franz Schanovsky Jacopo Franco María Toledano Luque Michael Nelhiebel	The Paradigm Shift in Understanding the Bias Temperature Instability: From Reaction-Diffusion to Switching Oxide Traps
2012	Kelin Kuhn	Considerations for Ultimate CMOS Scaling
2013	Rui Zhang Po-Chin Huang Ju-Chin Lin Noriyuki Taoka Mitsuru Takenaka Shinichi Takagias	High-Mobility Ge p- and n-MOSFETs With 0.7-nm EOT Using HfO2/Al2O3/GeOx/Ge Gate Stacks Fabricated by Plasma Postoxidation
2014	Sylvain Barraud Jean-Michel Hartmann Virginie Maffini-Alvaro Lucie Tosti Vincent Delaye Dominique Lafond	Top-Down Fabrication of Epitaxial SiGe/Si Multi-(Core/Shell) p-FET Nanowire Transistors
2015	Stefano Ambrogio Simone Balatti Vincent McCaffrey Daniel C. Wang Daniele Ielmini	Noise-Induced Resistance Broadening in Resistive Switching Memory Part I: Intrinsic Cell Behavior / Part II: Array Statistics
2016	Takatoshi Tsujimura Takeshi Hakii Suguru Noda	A Color-Tunable Polychromatic Organic-Light-Emitting-Diode Device With Low Resistive Intermediate Electrode for Rollto-Roll Manufacturing
2017	L. Witters, H. Arimura, F. Sebaai, A. Hikavyy, A. P. Milenin, R. Loo, A. De Keersgieter, G. Eneman, T. Schram, K. Wostyn, K. Devriendt, A. Schulze, R. Lieten, S. Bilodeau, E. Cooper, P. Storck, E. Chiu, C. Vrancken, P. Favia, E. Vancoille, J. Mitard, R. Langer, A. Opdebeeck, F. Holsteyns, N. Waldron, K. Barla, V. De Heyn, D. Mocuta, and N. Collaert	Strained Germanium Gate-All-Around pMOS Device Demonstration Using Selective Wire Release Etch Prior to Replacement Metal Gate Deposition
2018	Konstantin Osipov, Joachim Wuerfl, Ina Ostermay, Frank Brunner, Günther Tränkle and Maniteja Bodduluri	Local 2DEG Density Control in Heterostructures of Piezoelectric Materials and Its Application in GaN HEMT Fabrication Technology
2019	Kihyun Choi, Hyun Chul Sagong, Wonchang Kang, Hyunjin Kim, Jiang Hai, Miji Lee, Bomi Kim, Mi-ji Lee, Soonyoung Lee, Hyewon Shim, Junekyun Park, YoungWoo Cho, Hwa Sung Rhee and Sangwoo Pae	Enhanced Reliability of 7nm Process Technology Featuring EUV
2020	Kangguo Cheng, Chanro Park, Heng Wu, Juntao Li, Son Nguyen, Jingyun Zhang, Miaomiao Wang, Sanjay Mehta, Zuoguang Liu, Richard Conti, Nicholas J. Loubet, Julien Frougier, Andrew Greene, Tenko Yamashita, Balasubramanian Haran and Rama Divakaruni	Improved Air Spacer for Highly Scaled CMOS Technology
2021	Jixuan Wu, Fei Mo, Takuya Saraya, Toshiro Hiramoto, Mototaka Ochi, Hiroshi Goto and Masaharu Kobayashi	Monolithic Integration of Oxide Semiconductor FET and Ferroelectric Capacitor Enabled by Sn-Doped InGaZnO for 3-D Embedded RAM Application
2022	Akshay M. Arabhavi, Filippo Ciabattini, Sara Hamzeloui, Ralf Flückiger, Tamara Saranovac, Daxin Han, Diego Marti, Giorgio Bonomo, Rimjhim Chaudhary, Olivier Ostinelli, and Colombo R. Bolognesi	InP/GaAsSb Double Heterojunction Bipolar Transistor Emitter-Fin Technology With fMAX = 1.2 THz
2023	Weiyi Li, Brian Romanczyk, Matthew Guidry, Emre Akso, Nirupam Hatui, Christian Wurm, Wenjian Liu, Pawana Shrestha, Henry Collins, Christopher Clymore, Stacia Keller, and Umesh K. Mishra	Record RF Power Performance at 94 GHz From Millimeter-Wave N-Polar GaN-on-Sapphire Deep-Recess HEMTs

== See also ==
Paul Rappaport
