= Thomas Demery =

Former Asst. Secretary of US Dept HUD

Assistant Secretary of the U.S. Department of Housing and Urban Development
- In office 1986–1989
- President: Ronald Reagan
- Preceded by: Maurice Lee Barksdale

Personal details
- Born: Thomas T. Demery; July 18, 1949 (age 76) Detroit, Michigan, U.S.
- Party: Republican

Thomas T. Demery (born 18 July 1949 in Detroit, Michigan) is a former Assistant Secretary of the United States Department of Housing and Urban Development (HUD). He served during the Reagan administration. In 1993, he pleaded guilty to and was convicted of accepting a gratuity and obstruction of justice during his tenure in government.

== Business career ==
Between 1972 and 1978, Thomas Demery was chief operating officer of Bloomfield Management Co., a residents' property management company. After 1978, he worked as a licensed residential builder, real-estate broker, and mortgage correspondent. During the period 1982–1986, Demery served as a consultant to the Department of Housing and Urban Development for technical analyses and reviews of selected HUD multifamily mortgages.

== Career in government ==
On August 11, 1986, during his second term in office, then-President Ronald Reagan, after the resignation of Maurice Lee Barksdale from that position, announced his intention to nominate Demery to be the Assistant Secretary of Housing and Urban Development (H.U.D.). At the time, Demery was the president of Income Property Services, Inc., a real estate brokerage firm in Birmingham, Michigan.

=== Loan scandal ===
On 17 June 1993, Thomas Demery, after being indicted on charges of lying to Congress and accepting a $100,000 loan from a Michigan developer whom he'd helped to get federal housing subsidies in the 1980s, pleaded guilty to accepting a gratuity from that developer, and of obstructing justice. Demery was accused of steering $15 million worth of H.U.D. loan subsidies to the developer who had given him a $100,000 second mortgage on "extremely favorable terms" that was "never publicly recorded," as the indictment stated. Demery received a $50 fine on each count and was subject to a 2-year probation period.

=== Donations in exchange of HUD grants ===
In 1989, the Chicago Tribune reported that a charity which Demery had founded, "Food for Africa," had received over $290,000 in donations from developers and consultants who were connected with HUD projects. The newspaper suggested these donations had been made in return for federal subsidies. A subsequent report issued by the department concluded that there was no direct link between the donations and the federal subsidies. The report led to a wider congressional investigation into alleged grant rigging in the Ronald Reagan Administration.

== Personal life ==
Demery comes from a family of Greek immigrants. He has two children from his 1971 marriage. He is a devout Christian and has been a Church Elder at the Bloomfield Hills Christian Church.

== See also ==
- Reagan administration scandals
- Paul Manafort at the H.U.D.
