= Greg Vitali =

American politician

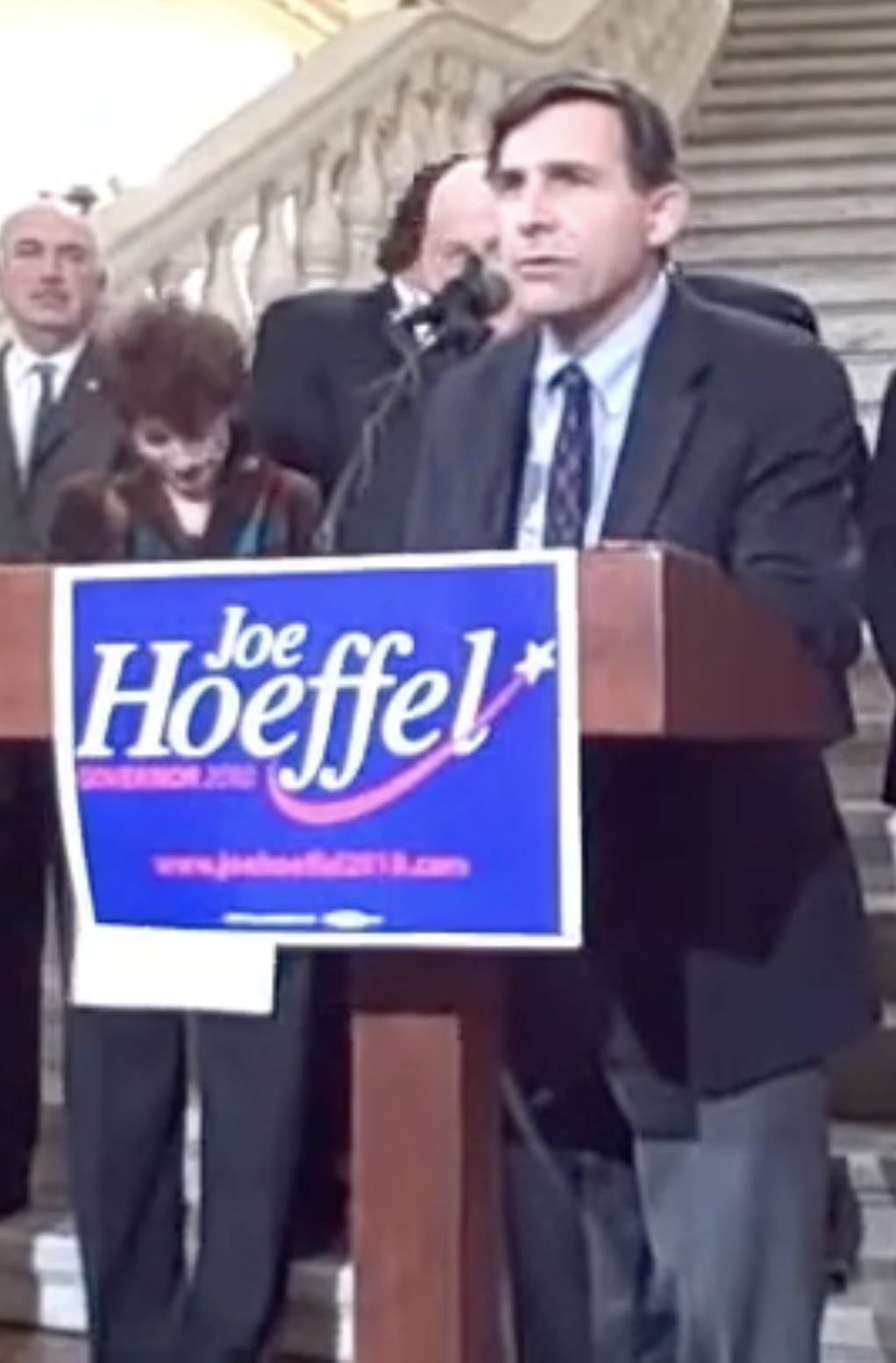

Member of the Pennsylvania House of Representatives from the 166th district
- Incumbent
- Assumed office January 5, 1993
- Preceded by: Stephen F. Freind

Personal details
- Born: June 4, 1956 (age 70) Havertown, Pennsylvania, U.S.
- Party: Democratic
- Education: Villanova University
- Occupation: State legislator and former lawyer
- Website: http://www.votevitali.com

Gregory Vitali (born June 4, 1956) is a Democratic member of the Pennsylvania House of Representatives. He has represented the 166th district since 1993. He currently serves as the Democratic chair of the House Environmental Resources and Energy Committee.

== Early life and education ==
Greg Vitali was born on June 4, 1956, in Havertown, Pennsylvania. He attended Saint Joseph's Preparatory School, graduating in 1974. In 1978, he graduated cum laude from Villanova University with a Bachelor of Science in economics. He received his law degree from Villanova University School of Law in 1981.

== Career ==
Vitali practiced law in Delaware County for 12 years. In 1993, he was elected to the Pennsylvania House of Representatives as the first Democratic legislator from the 166th district. He serves on the House Environmental Resource and Energy Committee and has made environmental protection a priority in his role in the state house. Additionally Vitali has taught classes on state and local government at Villanova and is an ex-officio member of the Bryn Mawr Film Institute's board of directors.

In January 2018, Vitali announced his intention to seek the Democratic nod for the US Congress for the 7th district after Pat Meehan declined to run for reelection. He lost to Mary Gay Scanlon, receiving 5,568 votes or 9.4 percent of the share.

While running for re-election in 2026, Vitali lost in the primary to challenger Judy Trombetta.
