= George R. Johnson =

American politician

Member of the Pennsylvania House of Representatives from the 166th district
- In office 1969–1972
- Preceded by: District created
- Succeeded by: Faith Whittlesey

Member of the Pennsylvania House of Representatives from the Delaware County district
- In office 1967–1968

Personal details
- Born: October 19, 1929 West Haven, Connecticut
- Died: September 28, 1973 (aged 43) Chester, Pennsylvania
- Party: Republican
- Education: Temple University Law School
- Occupation: lawyer

George R. Johnson (October 19, 1929 – September 28, 1973) was an American politician who served as a Republican member of the Pennsylvania House of Representatives for the Delaware County district from 1967 to 1968 and the 166th district from 1969 to 1972.

== Early life and education ==
Johnson was born in West Haven, Connecticut and graduated from Haverford High School in Haverford, Pennsylvania. He received a B.S. degree from St. Joseph's College in 1952 and an LL.B. from Temple University Law School in 1955.

== Career ==
Johnson was chosen to represent the Delaware County district in the Pennsylvania House of Representatives, where he served from 1967 to 1968. Districts in Pennsylvania were converted from counties to distinct districts after 1968. Johnson was chosen to represent the newly created 166th district in 1969 and in office through 1972.

He was not a candidate for reelection to the House for the 1973 term.

== Death and interment ==
Johnson died in Chester, Pennsylvania and was interred at the Saints Peter and Paul cemetery in Springfield, Pennsylvania.
