= Paul Rappaport =

American scientist

- Born: March 25, 1922; Philadelphia, US
- Died: April 21, 1980 (aged 58); Evergreen, Colorado, US
- Education: Carnegie Institute of Technology (B., M.); Arizona State University (DSc)
- Spouse: Rose Goldblatt
- Children: Wendy Lewis, Candace Rappaport, Elycia Rappaport
- Awards: William R. Cherry Award
- Scientific career
- Fields: Photovoltaics, energy conversion, transistors and integrated circuits

Paul Rappaport was an American physicist and a solar energy expert.

== Career ==
Paul Rappaport joined RCA Corporation in 1949. He was originally researching transistors and integrated circuits. Since 1953, he contributed most of his time on energy conversion and solar photo cells. He left RCA Corporation in 1977.

He is also the founding director of the Solar Energy Research Institute in Golden, Colorado.

== IEEE Paul Rappaport Award ==
To commemorate Dr. Rappaport's contributions, the IEEE Paul Rappaport Award was established in 1984. One paper is selected from IEEE Electron Devices Society each year.

== Death ==
He died on April 21, 1980 at his home in Evergreen, Colorado after combating a long illness.

== Patents ==
- CA656618A Nuclear battery
- US3263085A Radiation powered semiconductor devices (invented with Jr Edward Pasierb)
- US3187193A Multi-junction negative resistance semiconducting devices (invented with Jr Edward Pasierb)
- US2975286A Radiation detection (invented with Joseph J. Loferski)
- CA543100A Secondary electron emitter
- US2819414A Radioactive battery employing stacked semi-conducting devices (invented with Ralph L. Sherwood)
- AU197954A Self-powered semiconductive devices
- AU208117B2 Self-powered semiconductive devices
- US2998550A Apparatus for powering a plurality of semi-conducting units from a single radioactive battery (invented with Warren T Collins)
- US2713644A Self-powered semiconductor devices
- DE1036413B Primary voltage source with which nuclear radiation energy is converted into electrical energy
- CH330645A Primary element for generating a direct voltage
- AU123554A Means for converting the energy of nuclear emissions into useful electrical energy
- AU202741B2 Means for converting the energy of nuclear emissions into useful electrical energy
- US2976433A Radioactive battery employing semiconductors (invented with Joseph J. Loferski)
- US2745973A Radioactive battery employing intrinsic semiconductor
- US2976426A Self-powered semiconductive device
- US3094634A Radioactive batteries
- DE1012698B Process for the production of secondary emission cathodes with a magnesium oxide surface
- US2684990A Battery design for guided missiles
- US2768313A Controllable radioactive voltage charging devices
