= Pennsylvania House of Representatives, District 166 =

American legislative district

Pennsylvania's 166th State House of Representatives district
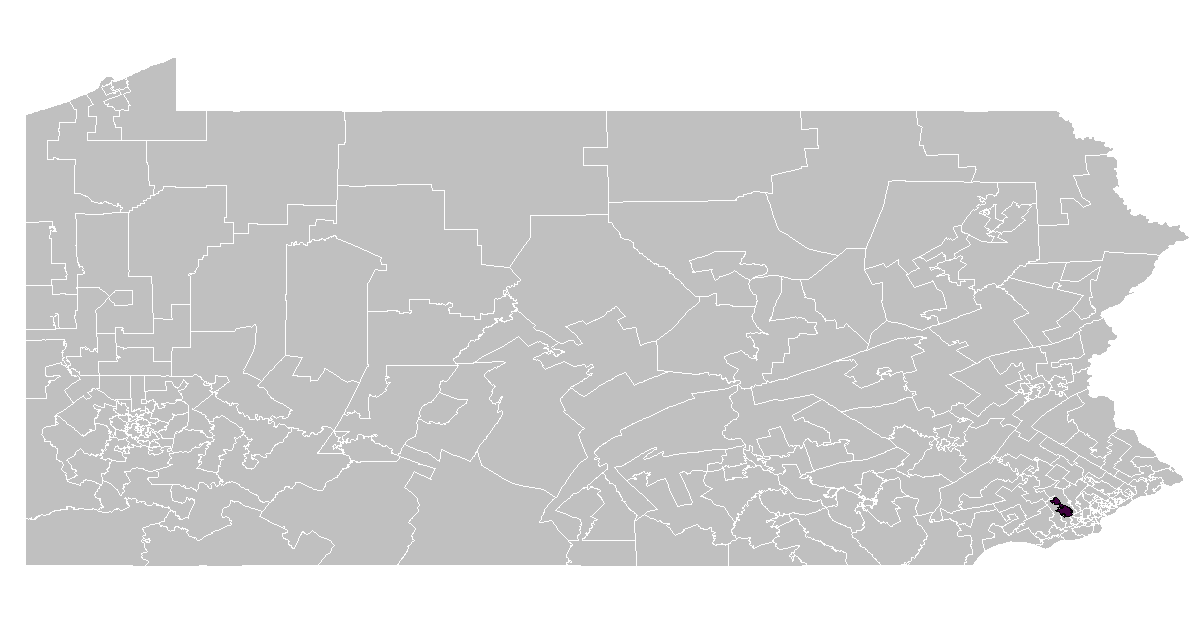
Representative
Greg Vitali; D–Haverford
- Demographics: 87.5% White; 5.3% Black; 2.8% Hispanic
- Population (2011) • Citizens of voting age: 61,878; 48,869

The 166th Pennsylvania House of Representatives District is in South Eastern Pennsylvania and has been represented by Greg Vitali since 1993.

== District profile ==
The 166th Pennsylvania House of Representatives District is located in Delaware County and Montgomery County and includes the following areas:

- Delaware County
  - Haverford Township (PART, Wards 02, 03, 04, 05, 06, 07 and 08)
  - Radnor Township (PART)
    - Ward 01 [PART, Division 02]
    - Ward 02
    - Ward 03 [PART, Division 02]
    - Ward 05 [PART, Division 01]
    - Ward 07
- Montgomery County
  - Lower Merion Township (PART)
    - Ward 04
    - Ward 08
    - Ward 10 [PART, Division 03]

== Representatives ==
Representative	Party	Years	District home	Note
Prior to 1969, seats were apportioned by county.
George R. Johnson	Republican	1969 – 1972		
Faith Ryan Whittlesey	Republican	1973 – 1976		Resigned from office
Stephen F. Freind	Republican	1976 – 1992		Elected in a special election in April 1976
Greg Vitali	Democrat	1993 – present	Haverford Township	Incumbent

== Recent election results ==
PA House election, 2010: Pennsylvania House, District 166
Party	Candidate	Votes	%	±%
Democratic	Greg Vitali	14,924	58.29	
Republican	John Williamson	10,678	41.71	
Margin of victory		4,246	16.58	
Turnout		25,602	100	

PA House election, 2012: Pennsylvania House, District 166
Party	Candidate	Votes	%	±%
Democratic	Greg Vitali	21,611	63.1	
Republican	Bill toal	12,637	36.9	
Margin of victory		8,974	26.2	▲4.81
Turnout		34,248	100	

PA House election, 2014: Pennsylvania House, District 166
Party	Candidate	Votes	%	±%
Democratic	Greg Vitali	14,325	63.1	
Republican	Sarah Armstrong	8,375	36.9	
Margin of victory		5,950	26.2	
Turnout		22,700	100	

PA House election, 2016: Pennsylvania House, District 166
Party	Candidate	Votes	%	±%
Democratic	Greg Vitali	23,783	66.03	
Republican	James Knapp	12,236	33.97	
Margin of victory		11,547	32.06	▲2.93
Turnout		36,019	100	
