= Frank Cassidy =

American businessman and government official

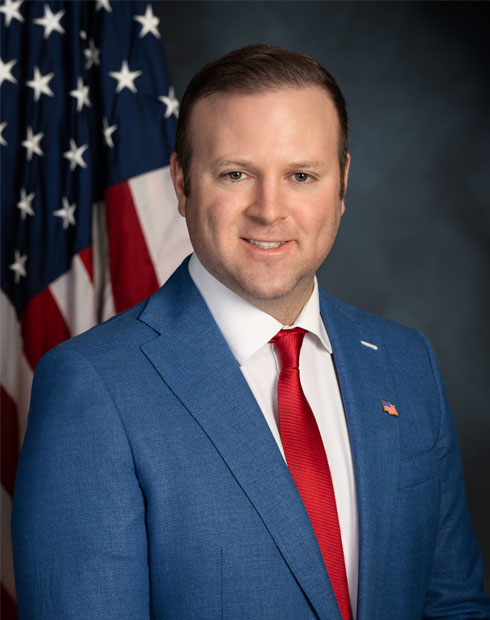

Assistant Secretary of Housing and Urban Development for Housing Federal Housing Commissioner
- In office January 15, 2026 – June 1, 2026
- President: Donald Trump
- Preceded by: Julia Gordon

Principal Deputy Assistant Secretary for Housing
- In office April 14, 2025 – January 15, 2026
- President: Donald Trump

Personal details
- Born: Francis X. Cassidy III; June 28, 1989 (age 37) Pennsylvania, U.S.
- Party: Republican
- Education: Saint Joseph's University (BA)
- Occupation: Commercial Real estate finance executive, government official

Frank Cassidy (born June 28, 1989) is an American commercial real estate finance executive and former government official who served as Assistant Secretary for Housing and Federal Housing Commissioner at the United States Department of Housing and Urban Development.

Prior to entering government service, Cassidy spent 14 years in commercial real estate finance. He was nominated by President Donald Trump in 2025 and confirmed by the U.S. Senate in December 2025.

As Federal Housing Commissioner, Cassidy led Housing and Urban Development's Office of Housing and oversaw the Federal Housing Administration (FHA).

== Early life and education ==
Frank Cassidy was born in Montgomery County, Pennsylvania and was raised in Springfield Township. He graduated from La Salle College High School in Wyndmoor, Pennsylvania.

He later earned a bachelor's degree from Saint Joseph's University in Philadelphia.

== Career ==
=== Commercial real estate finance ===
Before joining the United States Department of Housing and Urban Development, Cassidy built a career in commercial real estate finance, specializing in multifamily housing, healthcare facilities, seniors housing, and government-insured lending.

He held positions with Oppenheimer Holdings, Newmark, and Walker & Dunlop.

At the time he was approached by the Trump administration in February 2025, Cassidy was working in Philadelphia as Senior Managing Director of FHA Finance for Walker & Dunlop.

=== Housing and Urban Development ===
Cassidy joined the United States Department of Housing and Urban Development in April 2025 as Principal Deputy Assistant Secretary for HUD's Office of Housing and the Federal Housing Administration. In that role, he oversaw HUD's Office of Housing and FHA's mortgage insurance programs.

President Donald Trump nominated Cassidy to serve as Assistant Secretary for Housing and Federal Housing Commissioner in August 2025.

The United States Senate Committee on Banking, Housing, and Urban Affairs held a nomination hearing on October 30, 2025. The Senate subsequently confirmed Cassidy in December 2025.

=== Federal Housing Commissioner ===
As Federal Housing Commissioner, Cassidy oversaw FHA loan programs supporting single-family homeownership, multifamily rental housing, healthcare facilities, and manufactured housing.

Under Cassidy's direction, Federal Housing Administration programs were modernized and regulatory burdens were reduced, while housing access was expanded. Additionally, Cassidy eliminated sustainability requirements for multifamily mortgages. In the single-family market, he revised the FHA’s loss mitigation waterfall intended to improve borrower outcomes and reduce losses to the Mutual Mortgage Insurance Fund. Cassidy also created a "fast-track program" for Section 232 loans. During Cassidy's tenure, the FHA announced it would adopt FICO 10T and VantageScore 4.0 as eligible credit scoring models. He cited "a multifamily premium cut as being among his accomplishments."

In the FHA, Cassidy worked to establish relationships with lenders, developers, and other housing-market participants. He additionally sought to reduce regulations, and argued that removing 'red tape' would help solve the housing crisis. Cassidy described FHA as a public-private partnership.

In 2025, Cassidy, along with Scott Turner, the United States Secretary of Housing and Urban Development, submitted the FHA’s Fiscal Year 2025 Annual Report to Congress on the Mutual Mortgage Insurance Fund; it reflected the aim of "expanding access to homeownership for first-time and underserved borrowers." Cassidy sought to run the FHA more like a business, with emphasis on efficiency, customer service, and processing times.

In June 2026, Cassidy resigned from HUD and returned to the private sector, becoming senior managing director at Walker & Dunlop.

=== Politics ===
Cassidy supported the appointment of Bill Pulte as Director of National Intelligence in June 2026.

== Philanthropy ==
In 2024, Cassidy started The Frank Cassidy '08 Endowment Fund at La Salle College High School to give "financial assistance to students who have demonstrated financial need".

In June 2024, Cassidy established the Francis X. Cassidy Jr. Memorial Scholarship at DeSales University, in honor of his father.
