= Nicolas P. Retsinas =

American economist (1946–2026)

Assistant Secretary of Housing and Urban Development for Housing
- In office 1993–1998
- President: William Jefferson Clinton
- Preceded by: Arthur J. Hill
- Succeeded by: William C. Apgar

Personal details
- Born: 13 November 1946 Providence, Rhode Island, U.S.
- Died: 4 November 2026 (aged 79)

Nicolas P. Retsinas (13 November 1946 – 4 November 2026) was an American economist who served as U.S. Assistant Secretary of Housing and Urban Development for Housing and as Director of the Office of Thrift Supervision during the presidency of Bill Clinton. He was later director of the Joint Center for Housing Studies at Harvard University, and then chair of the board of commissioners of Rhode Island Housing, among other roles.

== Life and career ==
Retsinas was born in 1946. He graduated from New York University, where he studied Economics, received a Master’s degree in City Planning from Harvard University, and a doctorate in public service from Rhode Island College.

He served on the board of directors of many organizations, including Habitat for Humanity International, the Center for Responsible Lending, Freddie Mac, and the Community Development Trust, and received numerous awards and accolades over his career.

Retsinas died on 4 November 2026, at the age of 79.
