= Assistant Secretary of Housing and Urban Development for Housing =

Assistant Secretary for the Office of Housing and the Federal Housing (FHA) Commissioner
- Seal of the Department of Housing and Urban Development
- Department of Housing and Urban Development
- Style: Madam Secretary; The Honorable (formal address in writing)
- Reports to: Secretary of Housing and Urban Development
- Seat: Washington, D.C., US
- Appointer: The president; with Senate advice and consent
- Term length: No fixed term
- Constituting instrument: 42 U.S.C. § 3533
- Formation: September 9, 1965; 61 years ago
- First holder: Philip N. Brownstein
- Salary: Level IV of the Executive Schedule
- Website: www.HUD.gov

The assistant secretary for housing, who also carries the title Federal Housing Commissioner, is a position within the United States Department of Housing and Urban Development. The assistant secretary is responsible for overseeing the nearly $2 trillion Federal Housing Administration mortgage insurance portfolio and the Department of Housing and Urban Development's regulatory responsibilities in the area of the Real Estate Settlement Procedures Act, the housing mission of Fannie Mae and Freddie Mac, and the manufactured housing industry.

== Role ==
The federal housing commissioner is appointed by the president and confirmed by the United States Senate. The assistant secretary is third in the order of succession for the office of Secretary of Housing and Urban Development. The assistant secretary is paid at level IV of the Executive Schedule, receiving an annual salary depending on certain factors. The position was previously held by Julia Gordon. In August 2025, President Donald J. Trump nominated Frank Cassidy to serve as Assistant Secretary of Housing and Federal Housing Commissioner. The nomination was referred to the United States Senate Committee on Banking, Housing, and Urban Affairs for consideration and a hearing was scheduled for October 30, 2025. Cassidy was confirmed by the U.S Senate in December 2025.

== Assistant secretaries of housing and urban development for housing ==
At the founding of the Department of Housing and Urban Development in 1965, one assistant secretary role was specifically designated to perform the functions of the existing role of Federal Housing Commissioner. HUD Secretary George W. Romney split the role between two new titles, Assistant Secretary for Housing Production and Mortgage Credit (HPMC, for the production side of Sections 235 and 236 and public housing), combining the GHA commissioner role, and a separate Assistant Secretary for Housing Management (HM). Finally, on June 16, 1976, HUD Secretary Carla Hills merged the two roles into one single Assistant Secretary for Housing & Federal Housing Commissioner role, which remains the title today.

Federal Housing Commissioner

Image	Name	Term began	Term ended	President(s)
	James A. Moffett	1934	1935	
	Stewart McDonald	1935	1940	
	Abner H. Ferguson	1940	1945	
	Raymond M. Foley	1945	1947	Harry S. Truman
	Franklin D. Richards	1947	1952	Harry S. Truman
	Walter L. Greene	1952	1953	
	Guy T. O. Hollyday	1953	1954	
	Norman P. Mason	1954	1959	Dwight D. Eisenhower
	Julian H. Zimmerman	1959	1960	
	Norman P. Mason (acting)	1960	1961	
	Neal J. Hardy	1961	1963	
	Phillip N. Brownstein	1963	1969^{†}	

Assistant Secretary – Federal Housing Commissioner

Image	Name	Term began	Term ended	President(s)
	Philip N. Brownstein	1963^{†}	1969	Lyndon B. Johnson
	Eugene M. Gulledge	1969	1969	Richard M. Nixon

^{†}Incumbent FHA Commissioner at founding of Department of Housing and Urban Development

Assistant Secretary of Housing Production and Mortgage Credit – Federal Housing Commissioner

Image	Name	Term began	Term ended	President(s) served under
	Eugene M. Gulledge	October 1969	January 1973	Richard M. Nixon
	Woodward Kingman (acting)	January 1973	June 1973	Richard M. Nixon
	Sheldon B. Lubar	July 1973	November 1974	Richard M. Nixon
	Sheldon B. Lubar	July 1973	November 1974	Gerald R. Ford
	David M. DeWilde (acting)	November 1974	August 1975	Gerald R. Ford
	David S. Cook	August 1975	June 14, 1976	Gerald R. Ford

Assistant Secretary of Housing Management

Image	Name	Term began	Term ended	President(s) served under
	Lawrence M. Cox	March 1969	July 1970	Richard M. Nixon
	Norman V. Watson	July 1970	January 1973	Richard M. Nixon
	Abner Silverman (acting)	January 1973	March 1973	Richard M. Nixon
	H.R. Crawford	April 1973	January 1976	Richard M. Nixon
	H.R. Crawford	April 1973	January 1976	Gerald R. Ford
	Robert C. Odle Jr. (acting)	January 1976	March 1976	Gerald R. Ford
	James L. Young	March 1976	June 14, 1976	Gerald R. Ford

Assistant Secretary of Housing – Federal Housing Commissioner

Image	Name	Term began	Term ended	President(s) served under
	James L. Young	June 14, 1976	December 1976	Gerald R. Ford
	John T. Howley (acting)	December 1976	March 1977	Gerald R. Ford
	John T. Howley (acting)	December 1976	March 1977	Jimmy Carter
	Lawrence B. Simons	March 1977	1980	Jimmy Carter
	Philip D. Winn	1981	1982	Ronald Reagan
	Philip Abrams	1982	1983	Ronald Reagan
	Maurice Lee Barksdale	1983	1985	Ronald Reagan
	Thomas Demery	1986	1989	Ronald Reagan
	Catherine Austin Fitts	1989	1990	George H. W. Bush
	Arthur J. Hill	April 1991	1993	George H. W. Bush
	Nicolas P. Retsinas	June 1993	February 27, 1998	Bill Clinton
	William C. Apgar	March 1998	January 20, 2001	Bill Clinton
	John C. Weicher	June 1, 2001	2005	George W. Bush
	Brian D. Montgomery	February 2005	July 2009	George W. Bush
	Brian D. Montgomery	February 2005	July 2009	Barack Obama
	David H. Stevens	July 2009	March 2011	Barack Obama
	Carol Galante	July 2011	December 2012	Barack Obama
	Carol Galante	December 2012	October 24, 2014	Barack Obama
	Biniam Gebre	October 2014	April 7, 2015	Barack Obama
	Ed Golding	April 7, 2015	January 20, 2017	Barack Obama
	Dana T. Wade	July 2017	June 5, 2018	Donald Trump
	Brian D. Montgomery	June 5, 2018	May 12, 2020	Donald Trump
	Dana T. Wade	July 28, 2020	January 20, 2021	Donald Trump
	Janet M. Golrick	January 20, 2021	May 20, 2022	Joe Biden
	Julia Gordon	May 20, 2022	January 20, 2025	Joe Biden
	Frank Cassidy	January 15, 2026	June 1, 2026	Donald Trump

Previous Federal Housing Commissioners include Carol Galante, who served as Acting Federal Housing Commissioner from July 2011 until she was confirmed by the Senate in December 2012. She served as Federal Housing Commissioner until October 2014, when she stepped down to take a faculty position at the University of California at Berkeley. Before her, Brian D. Montgomery, who was confirmed in February 2005 served as Federal Housing Commissioner. The previous Federal Housing Commissioner was John C. Weicher.
