= Scandals of the Reagan administration =

Scandals involving the Reagan administration

The presidency of Ronald Reagan was marked by numerous scandals, resulting in the investigation, indictment or conviction of over 138 administration officials, the largest number for any president of the United States.

== Iran–Contra affair ==
The most well-known and politically damaging of the scandals since Watergate, the Iran-Contra affair came to light in 1986 when Ronald Reagan conceded that the United States had sold weapons to the Islamic Republic of Iran as part of a largely unsuccessful effort to secure the release of six U.S. citizens being held hostage in Lebanon. It was also disclosed that some of the money from the arms deal with Iran had been covertly and illegally funneled into a fund to aid the right-wing Contras counter-revolutionary groups seeking to overthrow the socialist Sandinista government of Nicaragua. The Iran–Contra affair, as it became known, did serious damage throughout the Reagan presidency. The investigations were effectively halted when Reagan's vice-president and successor, George H. W. Bush pardoned Secretary of Defense Caspar Weinberger before his trial began.

1. Caspar Weinberger, United States Secretary of Defense, was pardoned before trial by George H. W. Bush
2. Elliott Abrams agreed to cooperate with investigators and in return was allowed to plead guilty to two misdemeanor charges instead of facing possible felony indictments. He was sentenced to two years' probation and one hundred hours of community service. He was also pardoned by Bush on December 24, 1992, along with five other former Reagan Administration officials who had been implicated in connection with Iran–Contra.
3. National Security Adviser Robert C. McFarlane, pleaded guilty to four misdemeanors and was sentenced to two years' probation and 200 hours of community service and was ordered to pay a $20,000 fine. He was also pardoned by Bush.
4. Alan D. Fiers was the Chief of the Central Intelligence Agency's Central American Task Force. He pleaded guilty in 1991 to two counts of withholding information from Congress and was sentenced to one year of probation and one hundred hours of community service. He was also pardoned by Bush.
5. Richard R. Miller – Partner with Oliver North in IBC, an Office of Public Diplomacy front group, convicted of conspiracy to defraud the United States.
6. Clair George was Chief of the Central Intelligence Agency's Division of Covert Operations under President Reagan. George was convicted of lying to two congressional committees in 1986. He was pardoned by Bush.
7. Richard Secord was indicted on nine felony counts of lying to Congress and pleaded guilty to a felony charge of lying to Congress.
8. Thomas G. Clines was convicted of four counts of tax-related offenses for failing to report income from the Iran/Contra operations.
9. Carl R. Channel – Office of Public Diplomacy, partner in International Business- first person convicted in the Iran/Contra scandal, pleaded guilty of one count of defrauding the United States
10. John Poindexter, Reagan's national security advisor, was found guilty of five criminal counts including lying to Congress, conspiracy and obstruction of justice. His conviction was later overturned on grounds that he did not receive a fair trial (the prosecution may have been influenced by his immunized testimony in front of Congress.)
11. Oliver North was indicted on sixteen charges in the Iran–Contra affair and found guilty of three—aiding and abetting obstruction of Congress, shredding or altering official documents and accepting a gratuity. His convictions were later overturned on the grounds that his immunized testimony had tainted his trial.
12. Duane R. Clarridge also pardoned before trial by Bush
13. Albert Hakim pleaded guilty to supplementing the salary of North
14. Joseph F. Fernandez indicted on four counts of obstruction and false statements; case dismissed when Attorney General Richard L. Thornburgh refused to declassify information needed for his defense

== Department of Housing and Urban Development grant rigging ==
The HUD rigging scandal occurred when Department of Housing and Urban Development Secretary Samuel Pierce and his associates rigged low-income housing bids to favor Republican contributors to Reagan's campaign as well as rewarding Republican lobbyists such as James G. Watt Secretary of the Interior. Sixteen convictions were eventually handed down, including the following:

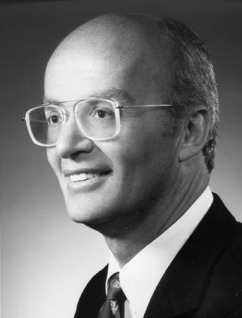
James Watt

1. James Watt, Reagan's Secretary of the Interior, was indicted on 24 felony counts and pleaded guilty to a single misdemeanor. He was sentenced to five years' probation and ordered to pay a $5000 fine.
2. Phillip D. Winn, assistant HUD Secretary, pleaded guilty to one count of scheming to give illegal gratuities; and was pardoned by President Bill Clinton in November 2000.
3. Thomas Demery, assistant HUD Secretary, pleaded guilty to steering HUD subsidies to politically connected donors. Found guilty of bribery and obstruction of justice.
4. Deborah Gore Dean, executive assistant to Secretary Pierce, was indicted on thirteen counts: three counts of conspiracy, one count of accepting an illegal gratuity, four counts of perjury, and five counts of concealing articles. She was convicted on twelve. She appealed and prevailed on several counts, but the convictions for conspiracy remained.
5. Joseph A. Strauss, Special Assistant to the Secretary of HUD, was convicted for accepting payments to favor Puerto Rican land developers in receiving HUD funding.
6. Silvio D. DeBartolomeis, assistant HUD Secretary, convicted of perjury and bribery.
7. Catalina Vasquez Villalpando, the Treasurer of the United States from 1989 to 1993

Secretary Pierce, the "central person" in the scandal, was not charged because he made "full and public written acceptance of responsibility".

Retired Federal Judge Arlin Adams served as independent counsel in the first five years of the prosecution, through 1995. and Larry Thompson completed the work 1995–98.

== Lobbying scandals ==
When an administration staff member leaves office, federal law governs how quickly one can begin a lobbying career.

1. Michael Deaver, Reagan's Chief of Staff, was convicted of lying to both a congressional committee and to a federal grand jury about his lobbying activities after he left the government. He received three years' probation and was fined $100,000 after being convicted for lying to a congressional subcommittee.
2. Lyn Nofziger, Reagan's Press Secretary, was convicted on charges of illegal lobbying after leaving government service in Wedtech scandal. His conviction was later overturned.

== EPA scandals ==
A number of scandals occurred at the Environmental Protection Agency under the Reagan administration. Over twenty high-level EPA employees were removed from office during Reagan's first three years as president. Additionally, several Agency officials resigned amidst a variety of charges, ranging from being unduly influenced by industry groups to rewarding or punishing employees based on their political beliefs. Sewergate, the most prominent EPA scandal during this period, involved the targeted release of Superfund grants to enhance the election prospects of local officials aligned with the Republican Party.

1. Rita Lavelle, an administrator at the EPA, misused Superfund monies and was convicted of perjury. She served three months in prison, was fined $10,000 and given five years' probation.
2. Anne Gorsuch Burford, the controversial head of the EPA. Burford, citing "Executive Privilege," refused to turn over Superfund records to Congress. She was found in Contempt, whereupon she resigned.

== Savings and loan crisis ==
Savings and loan crisis in which 747 institutions failed and had to be rescued with $160 billion in taxpayer dollars. Reagan's "elimination of loopholes" in the tax code included the elimination of the "passive loss" provisions that subsidized rental housing. Because this was removed retroactively, it bankrupted many real estate developments which used this tax break as a premise, which in turn bankrupted 747 Savings and Loans, many of whom were operating more or less as banks, thus requiring the Federal Deposit Insurance Corporation to cover their debts and losses with taxpayer money. This with some other "deregulation" policies, ultimately led to the largest political and financial scandal in U.S. history to that date. The ultimate cost of the crisis is estimated to have totaled around $150 billion, about $125 billion of which was directly subsidized by the U.S. government, which further increased the large budget deficits of the early 1990s. See Keating Five.

As an indication of this scandal's size, Martin Mayer wrote at the time, "The theft from the taxpayer by the community that fattened on the growth of the savings and loan (S&L) industry in the 1980s is the worst public scandal in American history. Teapot Dome in the Harding administration and the Credit Mobilier in the times of Ulysses S. Grant have been taken as the ultimate horror stories of capitalist democracy gone to seed. Measuring by money, [or] by the misallocation of national resources ... the S&L outrage makes Teapot Dome and Credit Mobilier seem minor episodes."

Economist John Kenneth Galbraith called it "the largest and costliest venture in public misfeasance, malfeasance and larceny of all time".

== Operation Ill Wind ==
Operation Ill Wind was a three-year investigation launched in 1986 by the FBI into corruption by U.S. government and military officials, and private defense contractors.

1. Melvyn Paisley, appointed Assistant Secretary of the Navy in 1981 by Republican President Ronald Reagan, was found to have accepted hundreds of thousands of dollars in bribes. He pleaded guilty to bribery and served four years in prison.
2. James E. Gaines, Deputy Assistant Secretary of the Navy, took over when Paisley resigned his office. Gaines was convicted of accepting an illegal gratuity and theft and conversion of government property. He was sentenced to six months in prison.
3. Victor D. Cohen, Deputy Assistant Secretary of the Air Force, was the 50th conviction obtained under the Ill Wind probe when he pleaded guilty to accepting bribes and conspiring to defraud the government.

== Wedtech scandal ==
Wedtech scandal: Wedtech Corporation convicted of bribery for Defense Department contracts

1. Edwin Meese Attorney General, resigned but never convicted.
2. Lyn Nofziger White House Press Secretary, whose conviction of lobbying was overturned.
3. Mario Biaggi sentenced to 2½ years.
4. Robert García sentenced to 2½ years.

== Debategate ==
In the final days of the 1980 presidential election, briefing papers that were to have been used by President Jimmy Carter in preparation for the October 28, 1980, debate with Reagan were somehow acquired by Reagan's team. This was not divulged to the public until late June 1983, after Laurence Barrett published Gambling With History: Reagan in the White House, an in-depth account of the Reagan administration's first two years.

James Baker swore under oath that he had received the briefing book from William Casey, Reagan's campaign manager, but Casey vehemently denied this. The matter was never resolved as both the FBI and a congressional subcommittee failed to determine how or through whom the briefing book came to the Reagan campaign.

== See also ==
- List of federal political scandals in the United States#Ronald Reagan administration (1981–1989)
- 1980 October Surprise theory
