= Mark Skidmore (economist) =

American economist

Academic background
- Education: Ph.D. (University of Colorado); M.A. (University of Colorado); B.A. (University of Washington)

Academic work
- Discipline: Economics

Mark Skidmore is an American economist. He is Professor of Economics and Agricultural, Food, and Resource Economics at Michigan State University, where he holds the Morris Chair in State and Local Government Finance and Policy. Skidmore completed his undergraduate education at the University of Washington and received a Ph.D. in economics from the University of Colorado in 1994 for his dissertation "State Responses to Fiscal Stress".

== Research ==
In the spring of 2017, Skidmore summarized and reported on $21 trillion in unsupported accounting adjustments in the United States Department of Defense's budget.

Skidmore maintains a personal blog in which he has made a number of posts evincing a strong anti-vaccination stance. In January 2023, an article authored by Skidmore appeared in the journal BMC Infectious Diseases in which Skidmore claimed that the COVID-19 vaccines had killed 278,000 people. Following post-publication peer-review the article was retracted by the journal, citing concerns about methodology, accuracy, and mis-statements about ethical clearance.
