= Philip D. Winn =

American diplomat and politician

Assistant Secretary of Housing and Urban Development for Housing
- In office 1981–1982
- President: Ronald Reagan

US Ambassador to Switzerland and Liechtenstein
- In office August 19, 1988 – August 5, 1989
- President: Ronald Reagan

Personal details
- Born: February 1, 1925 New Britain, Connecticut, U.S.
- Died: January 24, 2017 (aged 91)
- Party: Republican

Philip Donald Winn (February 1, 1925 – January 24, 2017) was an American politician and diplomat who served as ambassador to Switzerland and Liechtenstein and also as Assistant Secretary of Housing and Urban Development for Housing under Ronald Reagan. He also served as the chair of the Colorado Republican Party.
