= Deborah Gore Dean =

Deborah Gore Dean is a former United States federal employee in the US Department of Housing and Urban Development during the Ronald Reagan presidency. She is also a distant relative of Senator Albert Gore Sr. and second cousin once removed of former Vice President Albert Gore Jr. She is most famous for her involvement in a fraud scandal at the Department of Housing and Urban Development involving the Moderate Rehabilitation Program.

== Biography ==
Deborah Gore Dean is a graduate of Georgetown University and the niece of onetime Maryland GOP leader Louise Gore. Her father, Gordon Dean, who was featured on the cover of Time magazine, won the Presidential Medal of Freedom for his work at the Nuremberg trials, chairman of the U.S. Atomic Energy Commission, and General Dynamics executive. Her mother, Mary Benton Gore Dean was a Washington socialite and owner of the Jockey Club restaurant and Fairfax Hotel.

Dean graduated with her B.A. from Georgetown University. Between 1982-1987, Dean worked for the United States Department of Housing and Urban Development (HUD) under Secretary Samuel Pierce. Before that she served at the United States Department of Energy (DOE) as special assistant to the secretary. On June 23, 1987, President Ronald Reagan announced his intention to nominate Deborah Gore Dean to be an Assistant Secretary of Housing and Urban Development. However there she was caught up in one of Washington, D.C.'s many political scandals that eventually found itself in front of the Supreme Court.

In 1993, a jury convicted Deborah Gore Dean of three counts of conspiracy to defraud the federal government, one count of having accepted an illegal gratuity, four counts of perjury, and four counts of engaging in a scheme to conceal material facts. The United States Court of Appeals eventually threw out the bulk of the charges. The District Court had sentenced Dean to two concurrent terms of twenty-one months' confinement on the first two conspiracy counts and fined Dean $2,500 on each of those counts. On each of the remaining counts, the court sentenced Dean to twenty-one months' confinement, to run concurrently with each other and with the sentences imposed under the first two conspiracy counts. Based on the ruling of the Court of Appeals, Dean was re-sentenced and eventually served one year of home confinement and a monetary fine.
