= Maurice Lee Barksdale =

American banker and public official

Maurice Lee Barksdale (born January 7, 1939) is an American banker and former public official who served as the United States Assistant Secretary of Housing and Urban Development for Housing during the presidency of Ronald Reagan. As of 2021, Barksdale was managing partner of Secor Capital, a Texas-based real estate investment firm.
