= MRIGlobal =

Kansas City-based non-profit research institute since 1944

Coordinates: 39.038111°N 94.581251°W

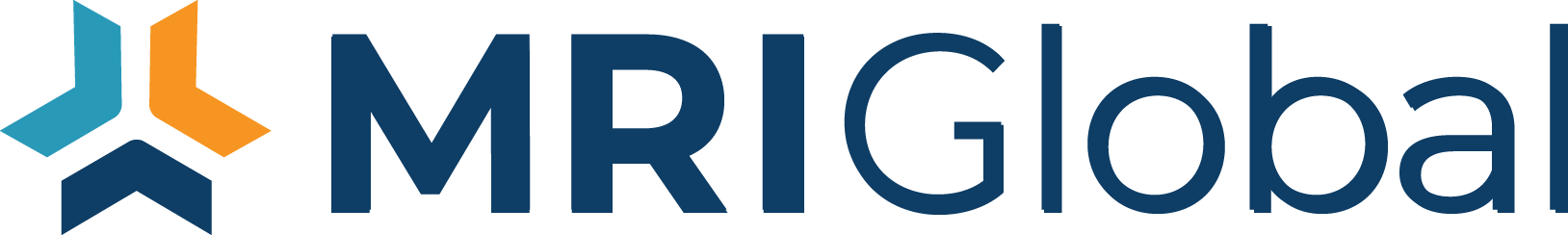
- Formerly: Midwest Research Institute
- Type: Nonprofit scientific research institute
- Industry: Research; Research and Development
- Founded: Kansas City, Missouri (June 17, 1944)
- Founder: Kansas City-area business leaders
- Headquarters: 425 Dr. Martin Luther King Jr. Boulevard; Kansas City, Missouri, United States
- Area served: Worldwide
- Services: Research; Research and development
- Number of employees: 550 (in FY13)
- Website: www.mriglobal.org

MRIGlobal is an independent, nonprofit, applied research organization based in Kansas City, Missouri, with offices also in Virginia, Maryland, and North Kansas City, Missouri. In addition to its own research laboratories, MRIGlobal co-manages the National Renewable Energy Laboratory research facility for the Department of Energy as part of the Alliance for Sustainable Energy.

MRIGlobal produces solutions to biological, chemical, and engineering challenges by performing research and development services for health and defense-focused organizations. This includes expertise in pharmaceutical research and clinical trial support, infectious disease biosurveillance and diagnostics development, biological and chemical threat agent detection, and laboratory management and operations.

== Foundation ==
Midwest Research Institute was founded in December 1943 individuals who were determined to retain and attract scientific and engineering talent in the Midwest.

Since its founding, the institute has performed work in collaboration with NASA, the U.S. Environmental Protection Agency, the U.S. Army, the National Cancer Institute, National Institute of Neurological Disorders and Stroke (NINDS), and the United States Department of State. On March 1, 2011, Midwest Research Institute was renamed MRIGlobal to reflect its expanded focus.

== Rapid expansion ==
MRIGlobal obtained its first contract with NASA in 1961 and its first U.S. Arms Control and Disarmament Agency contract in 1964. In the 1970s, the organization began working for the U.S. Environmental Protection Agency developing tests to detect and measure pollutants.

Expansion and growth continued in the 1980s. In 1982, a venture group was created to commercialize MRIGlobal’s inventions. Major projects included engineering lightweight thermoelectric cooling devices for U.S. Army aircraft. This technology earned an R&D 100 Award, and was used in Operation Desert Storm to keep flight personnel cool while operating in warm climates.

Throughout the next two decades, MRIGlobal expanded its operations, adding locations in Palm Bay, Florida, in 1999; Rockville, Maryland, in 2002; and Frederick, Maryland, in 2003.

== Recent history ==
On March 1, 2011, the Midwest Research Institute was renamed MRIGlobal to reflect its expanded focus.
