= Walter E. Williams =

American economist (1936–2020)

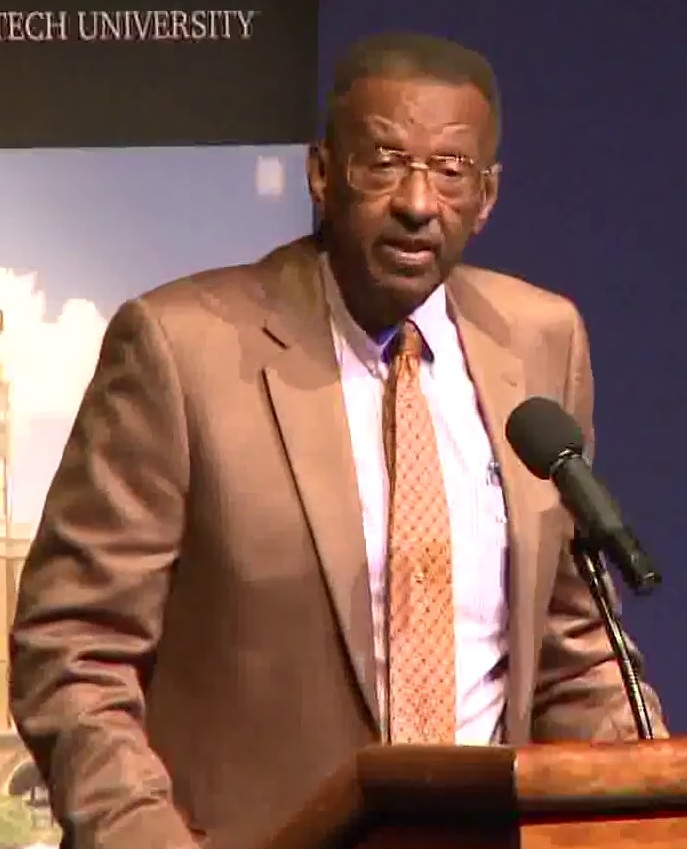
- Williams in 2013
- Born: Walter Edward Williams; March 31, 1936; Philadelphia, Pennsylvania, U.S.
- Died: December 1, 2020 (aged 84); Fairfax, Virginia, U.S.
- Years active: 1959−2020
- Spouse: Connie Taylor (m. 1960; died 2007)
- Children: 1

Academic background
- Education: California State University, Los Angeles (BA); University of California, Los Angeles (MA, PhD)

Academic work
- Discipline: Economics, education, politics, free market, race relations, liberty
- School or tradition: Libertarian economics
- Institutions: George Mason University; Temple University; Los Angeles City College; California State University, Los Angeles; Grove City College
- Notable ideas: Analysis of Davis–Bacon Act Research on occupational licensing, specifically in the taxi industry

Walter Edward Williams (March 31, 1936 – December 1, 2020) was an American economist, commentator, and academic. Williams was the John M. Olin Distinguished Professor of Economics at George Mason University, a syndicated columnist, and author. Williams held classical liberal and libertarian views, and wrote frequently for Townhall, WND, and Jewish World Review. Williams was also a popular guest host of The Rush Limbaugh Show when Limbaugh was unavailable.

== Early life and education ==
Williams was born in Philadelphia on March 31, 1936. His family during childhood consisted of his mother, his sister, and him; Williams's father played no role in raising Williams or his sister. The family initially lived in West Philadelphia, and later moved to North Philadelphia's Richard Allen housing projects when Williams was ten years old. He attended and graduated from Benjamin Franklin High School in North Philadelphia.

After graduating from high school, Williams traveled to California, where he lived with his father and attended Los Angeles City College for one semester. He later returned to Philadelphia and secured a job as a cab driver for the Yellow Cab Company. In 1959, he was drafted into the military and served as a private in the United States Army.

While stationed in the South, Williams "waged a one-man battle against Jim Crow from inside the army." He challenged the racial order with provocative statements to his fellow soldiers, resulting in an overseeing officer filing a court-martial proceeding against Williams. Williams argued his own case and was found not guilty. While considering filing countercharges against the officer who brought the charges against him, Williams was transferred to South Korea. Upon arriving there, Williams marked "Caucasian" for race on his personnel form. When challenged on this, Williams replied wryly if he had marked "Black," he would end up getting all the worst jobs. From Korea, Williams wrote a letter to President John F. Kennedy denouncing the pervasive racism in the American government and military and questioning the actions black Americans should take given the state of affairs, writing:

Should Negroes be relieved of their service obligation or continue defending and dying for empty promises of freedom and equality? Or should we demand human rights as our Founding Fathers did at the risk of being called extremists? I contend that we relieve ourselves of oppression in a manner that is in keeping with the great heritage of our nation.

Williams received a reply from the Deputy Assistant Secretary of Defense, Alfred B. Fitt, which he called "the most reasonable response that I received from any official."

Following his military service, Williams served as a juvenile group supervisor for the Los Angeles County Probation Department from 1963 to 1967. Williams also resumed his education, earning a bachelor's degree in economics in 1965 from California State College at Los Angeles (now Cal State Los Angeles). He earned both his master's degree and his PhD in economics from the University of California, Los Angeles (UCLA). Williams's doctoral thesis was titled The Low-Income Market Place.

Speaking of his early college days, Williams said: "I was more than anything a radical. I was more sympathetic to Malcolm X than Martin Luther King, because Malcolm X was more of a radical who was willing to confront discrimination in ways that I thought it should be confronted, including perhaps the use of violence. But I really just wanted to be left alone. I thought some laws, like minimum-wage laws, helped poor people and poor black people and protected workers from exploitation. I thought they were a good thing until I was pressed by professors to look at the evidence." During his time at UCLA, Williams came into contact with economists such as Armen Alchian, James M. Buchanan, and Axel Leijonhufvud who challenged his assumptions.

While Williams was attending UCLA, Thomas Sowell arrived on campus in 1969 as a visiting professor. Although he never took a class from Sowell, the two met and began a friendship that lasted for decades. In the summer of 1972, Sowell was hired as director of the Urban Institute's Ethnic Minorities Project, which Williams joined shortly thereafter. Correspondence between Sowell and Williams appears in "A Man of Letters," a 2007 autobiography authored by Sowell.

== Career ==
During his doctoral studies, Williams was an instructor in economics at Los Angeles City College from 1967 to 1969, and at Cal State Los Angeles from 1967 to 1971. After returning to his native Philadelphia, Williams taught economics at Temple University from 1973 to 1980. For the 1975–76 academic year, Williams was a visiting scholar at the Hoover Institution at Stanford University.

In 1980, Williams joined the economics faculty at George Mason University in Fairfax, Virginia. That same year, Williams began writing a syndicated column, "A Minority View", for Heritage Features Syndicate, which merged with Creators Syndicate in 1991. From 1995 to 2001, Williams chaired the economics department at George Mason University. Courses taught by Williams at George Mason include "Intermediate Microeconomics" for undergraduate students and "Microeconomic Theory I" for graduate students. Williams continued to teach at George Mason until his death in 2020.

In his nearly 50-year career, Williams wrote hundreds of research articles, book reviews, and commentaries for scholarly journals including American Economic Review, Policy Review, and Journal of Labor Research and popular journals including The American Spectator, Newsweek, Reason, and The Wall Street Journal.

Williams was awarded an honorary degree at Universidad Francisco Marroquín. He served on advisory boards including the Review Board of Economics Studies for the National Science Foundation, Reason Foundation, the National Tax Limitation Committee, and the Hoover Institute. Beginning in 1982, Williams set about writing ten books, beginning with The State Against Blacks and America: A Minority Viewpoint. He wrote and hosted documentaries for PBS in 1985. The "Good Intentions" documentary was based on his book The State Against Blacks.

== Economic and political views ==
As an economist, Williams was a proponent of free market economics and opposed socialist systems of government intervention. Williams believed laissez-faire capitalism to be the most moral, most productive system humans have ever devised.

In the mid-to-late 1970s, Williams conducted research into the Davis–Bacon Act of 1931 and on the impact of minimum wage laws on minority employment. His research led him to conclude the government's interventional programs are harmful. Williams was critical of state programs, including minimum wage and affirmative action laws, stating both practices inhibit liberty and are detrimental to the blacks they are intended to help. He published his results in his 1982 book The State Against Blacks, where he argued that laws regulating economic activity are far greater obstacles to economic progress for blacks than racial bigotry and discrimination. Subsequently, Williams spoke on the topic and penned a number of articles detailing his view that increases in the minimum wage price low skill workers out of the market, eliminating their opportunities for employment.

Williams believed that racism and the legacy of slavery in the United States are overemphasized as problems faced by the black community today. He pointed to the crippling effects of a welfare state and the disintegration of the black family as more pressing concerns. "The welfare state has done to black Americans what slavery couldn't do, and that is to destroy the black family." Although in favor of equal access to government institutions such as court houses, city halls, and libraries, Williams opposed anti-discrimination laws directed at the private sector on the grounds that such laws infringe upon the people's right of freedom of association.

Williams viewed gun control laws as a governmental infringement upon the rights of individuals, and argued that they end up endangering the innocent while failing to reduce crime. Williams also made the argument that the true proof of whether or not an individual owns something is whether or not they have the right to sell it. Taking this argument to its conclusion, he supported legalization of selling one's own bodily organs. He argued that government prohibiting the selling of one's bodily organs is an infringement upon one's property rights.

Williams praised the views of Thomas DiLorenzo, and wrote a foreword to DiLorenzo's anti-Abraham Lincoln book, The Real Lincoln. Williams maintained that the American states are entitled to secede from the union if they wish, as the Confederate states attempted to do during the Civil War, and asserted that the Union's victory in the Civil War allowed the federal government "to run amok over states' rights, so much so that the protections of the Ninth and Tenth Amendments mean little or nothing today."

In reaction to what he viewed as inappropriate racial sensitivity that he saw hurting blacks in higher education, Williams began in the 1970s to offer colleagues a "certificate of amnesty and pardon" to all white people for Western Civilization's sins against blacks – and "thus obliged them not to act like damn fools in their relationships with Americans of African ancestry." It is still offered to anyone. The certificate can be obtained at his website.

Williams was opposed to the Federal Reserve System, arguing that central banks are dangerous. In his autobiography, Williams cited Frédéric Bastiat, Ludwig von Mises, Friedrich Hayek, and Milton Friedman as influences that led him to become a libertarian. Williams praised Ayn Rand's Capitalism: The Unknown Ideal as "one of the best defenses and explanations of capitalism one is likely to read."

Aside from authoring his weekly columns, Williams was a frequent guest host for Rush Limbaugh's radio program when Limbaugh was away traveling. In 2009, Greg Ransom, a writer for the Ludwig von Mises Institute, ranked Williams as the third-most important "Hayekian" Public Intellectual in America, behind only Thomas Sowell and John Stossel. Reason called Williams "one of the country's leading libertarian voices."

== Personal life ==
Beginning in 1973, Williams lived in Devon, Pennsylvania. He was married to Connie (née Taylor) from 1960 until her death in 2007. They had one daughter. When he began teaching at George Mason University, he rented a cheap hotel room in Fairfax, Virginia, where he lived from Tuesdays through Thursdays around his teaching schedule. Williams was a cousin of Julius Erving, a professional basketball player with the Philadelphia 76ers. Williams served on the board of directors of Media General, parent company of the Richmond Times-Dispatch, from 2001 until his retirement from the board in 2011. He was also chairman of the company's audit committee.

== Death ==
On December 1, 2020, Williams died in his car in Fairfax, Virginia, shortly after teaching a class at George Mason University, at age 84. His daughter said that he suffered from chronic obstructive pulmonary disease and pulmonary hypertension. Shortly before his death, Williams was featured in the documentary, Uncle Tom, where he provided commentary on conservatism within the black community and discussed his own perspective as a black conservative.

== Bibliography ==
- Williams, Walter E. (1982). The State Against Blacks. New York: McGraw-Hill. ISBN 9780070703780. OCLC 15984778.
- Williams, Walter E. (1982). America: A Minority Viewpoint. Stanford: Hoover Institution Press. ISBN 9780817975623. OCLC 492741326.
- Williams, Walter E. (1987). All It Takes Is Guts: A Minority View. Washington: Regnery Gateway. ISBN 9780952265696. OCLC 242317610.
- Williams, Walter E. (1989). South Africa's War Against Capitalism. New York: Praeger. ISBN 9780275931797. OCLC 246932397.
- Williams, Walter E. (1990). South Africa's War Against Capitalism. Kenwyn [South Africa]: Juta. ISBN 9780702124457. OCLC 758452218.
- Williams, Walter E. (1995). Do The Right Thing: The People's Economist Speaks. Stanford: Hoover Institution Press. ISBN 9780817993825. OCLC 32666686.
- Williams, Walter E. (1999). More Liberty Means Less Government: Our Founders Knew This Well. Stanford: Hoover Institution Press. ISBN 0-8179-9612-5. OCLC 237344402.
- Williams, Walter E. (2008). Liberty Versus the Tyranny of Socialism: Controversial Essays. Stanford: Hoover Institution Press. ISBN 9780817949129. OCLC 495418182.
- Williams, Walter E. (2010). Up From The Projects: An Autobiography. Stanford: Hoover Institution Press. ISBN 978-0-8179-1255-0. OCLC 670480882.
- Williams, Walter E. (2011). Race & Economics: How Much Can Be Blamed on Discrimination?. Stanford: Hoover Institution Press. ISBN 978-0-8179-1244-4. OCLC 939069012.
- Williams, Walter E. (2015). American Contempt for Liberty. Stanford: Hoover Institution Press. ISBN 978-0-8179-1875-0. OCLC 1044305521.

== Filmography ==
- Good Intentions (1982), a documentary based on Williams' The State Against Blacks
- Suffer No Fools (2015), a biography examining Williams' life and work
- Uncle Tom (2020), Williams appeared as himself in the documentary Uncle Tom, which documents the perspective of conservative black Americans

== See also ==
- Black conservatism in the United States
- Libertarian conservatism
- List of economists
