= KXEX =

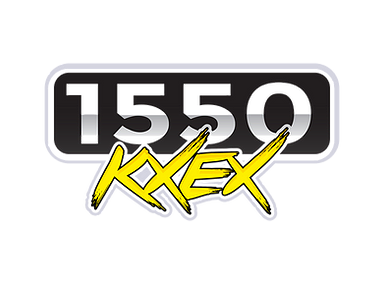
- Fresno, California; United States
- Broadcast area: Fresno metropolitan area
- Frequency: 1550 kHz
- Branding: TalkRadio 1550 KXEX

Programming
- Format: Talk radio
- Affiliations: Fox News Radio; Fox News Talk; Salem Radio Network; Westwood One

Ownership
- Owner: Bendita Eucaristia Radio, Inc.
- Operator: Guillermo Moreno

History
- First air date: September 20, 1962
- Call sign meaning: XEX is a popular Mexico City radio station, the call letters were chosen when KXEX played Regional Mexican music.

Technical information
- Licensing authority: FCC
- Facility ID: 54960
- Class: B
- Power: 5,000 watts (day); 2,500 watts (night)
- Transmitter coordinates: 36°46′13.8″N 119°55′23.5″W

Links
- Public license information: Public file; LMS
- Website: www.kxexradio.com

KXEX (1550 kHz) is a commercial radio station broadcasting a talk radio format branded as "TalkRadio 1550". Licensed to Fresno, California, the station serves the Fresno metropolitan area. KXEX is owned by Bendita Eucaristia Radio, Inc, its studios and offices are on West Olive Avenue in Fresno.

By day, KXEX is powered at 5,000 watts, at night it reduces power to 2,500 watts to protect other stations on 1550 AM, a clear channel frequency. KXEX uses a directional antenna with a four-tower array, its transmitter is on Garfield Avenue near McKinley Avenue on Fresno's west side.

== Programming ==
KXEX airs a mix of local and nationally syndicated conservative talk shows. National hosts include Hugh Hewitt, Dan Bongino, Charlie Kirk, Brian Kilmeade and Bill O'Reilly. General manager Guillermo Moreno hosts a local talk show in afternoon drive time. Actor and former Fresno Mayor Alan Autry hosts a midday show. Most hours begin with an update from Fox News Radio.

== History ==
=== Atlas ownership ===
The Federal Communications Commission (FCC) issued a construction permit to Robert L. Liepert for a new daytime-only radio station to serve Fresno on May 4, 1961. Before launching, Liepert sold the permit to Sylvia and John Sonder, doing business as the Atlas Broadcasting Company. John Sonder had been a sales manager for KGST, the first Spanish-language station in town, and after a bid to purchase it failed, he sought to build an outlet of his own, believing Fresno could sustain two Spanish-language radio stations. The Sonders changed the call letters to KXEX and modified the station plans to build studios and a transmitter site on Church Avenue. Broadcasting on the new station began September 20, 1962, almost entirely in Spanish.

In 1976, Sonder filed to increase the station's power from 500 to 5,000 watts and relocate it to a new site at the corner of Walnut and Clayton avenues near Easton, which was approved by the county in 1977 and by the FCC two years later. The power increase was soon followed by the beginning of nighttime broadcasts in 1983.

John Sonder died in 1990, and his wife Sylvia died in 1992, prompting the transfer of the station to their two children.

=== RAK Communications/Compass Broadcasting ===
The Sonder children sold KXEX in 1994 to RAK Communications, owners of KRGO (1220 AM) in the Fresno market, for $212,000. The two stations had complementary Spanish-language formats, with KRGO playing regional Mexican music and KXEX having a more adult contemporary sound.

=== Expanded Band assignment ===
On March 17, 1997, the FCC announced that eighty-eight stations had been given permission to move to newly available "Expanded Band" transmitting frequencies, ranging from 1610 to 1700 kHz, with KXEX authorized to move from 1550 to 1680 kHz.

A construction permit for the expanded band station was assigned the call letters KAVT (now KGED) on January 9, 1998. The FCC's initial policy was that both the original station and its expanded band counterpart could operate simultaneously for up to five years, after which owners would have to turn in one of the two licenses, depending on whether they preferred the new assignment or elected to remain on the original frequency. However, this deadline has been extended multiple times, and both stations have remained authorized. One restriction is that the FCC has generally required paired original and expanded band stations to remain under common ownership.

=== Later history ===
An era for the station ended in April 2001 when KXEX switched to its first English-language format in nearly four decades of broadcasting, picking up a lineup of primarily syndicated talk shows including those Don Imus, G. Gordon Liddy and Tom Leykis, as well as sports overflow programming. Four years later, New Valley Communications leased the station and flipped it to sports using programming from Sporting News Radio; in 2007, New Valley purchased KSLK (96.1 FM) in Visalia and simulcast its programming there as well. However, the sports format and New Valley lease ended in January 2009 when the station was leased out to a new group running Spanish-language Catholic programming, as "La Misionera", before New Valley was ready to move KSLK's transmitter to improve its signal in Fresno.

=== TalkRadio 1550 ===
On May 1, 2020, KXEX changed its format from Spanish religious to conservative talk, branded as "TalkRadio 1550"; the talk programming moved from co-owned KGED (1680 AM), while Bendita Eucaristia Radio, which had been airing on the station, moved to the stronger KGED. The talk station had emerged on KGED in 2018 when it was leased out to Guillermo Moreno, who hosts an afternoon program; most of the remainder of the station's programming comes from the Salem Radio Network. Days after moving the talk programming to KXEX, Compass sold both stations to Bendita Eucaristia Radio for $725,000.
