= KSLK =

KSLK may refer to:

- KSLK (FM), a radio station (101.7 FM) licensed to serve Selawik, Alaska, United States
- KSLK (California), a defunct radio station (96.1 FM) formerly licensed to serve Visalia, California, United States
- Adirondack Regional Airport (ICAO code KSLK)
