= Black conservatism in the United States =

Movement within conservatism among African Americans

Black conservatism in the United States is a political and social movement rooted in African-American communities that aligns largely with the American conservative movement and is part of black conservatism around the world. It is often associated with the Christian right (per 2007 data). Black conservatism emphasizes social conservatism, traditionalism, patriotism, capitalism, meritocracy, and free markets.

During the Reconstruction era, many black voters supported the Republican Party, which at the time was seen as a more racially progressive party due to their role in the Civil War, and the Democratic Party's continued support for a pro-segregation wing of their party. Booker T. Washington had a more conservative approach to politics in the United States while W. E. B. DuBois called for more radical change. Some African Americans supported Democrat Woodrow Wilson's first presidential campaign and were betrayed by his policies once in office. Under Franklin D. Roosevelt's administration, during his first two terms, civil rights legislation was not passed, however, New Deal programs led to the black vote becoming more split. In 1960, the Kennedy-Johnson campaign promoted civil rights as a central issue and during their administration, they passed anti-discrimination legislation, gaining the black vote. Since then, the Democratic Party has held a majority of the black votes in America, although Pew Research Center polling has found that the percentage of African-Americans who identify as Democratic has declined in recent years, from 75% during Barack Obama's presidency to 67% in 2020. A 2017 sample size of 10,245 voters concluded that just 8% of African-Americans identify as Republican.

Influential black Republicans in the early 21st century who have held public office include U.S. Senator Tim Scott, U.S. Supreme Court Justice Clarence Thomas, Governor of Florida-elect Byron Donalds and Cabinet secretaries Ben Carson, Condoleezza Rice, and Colin Powell. Political commentators Candace Owens, Thomas Sowell, Shelby Steele, Armstrong Williams, Larry Elder, Walter Williams, and Jason L. Riley are often cited as influential figures in black conservatism.

== Beliefs ==
One of the main characteristics of black conservatism is its emphasis on personal choice and responsibilities above socioeconomic status and institutional racism. Black conservatives typically support do-for-self, self reliance, and personal responsibility. Black conservatives tend to be self-critical of aspects of African-American culture that they believe have created poverty and dependency. John McWhorter's 2000 book Losing the Race: Self-Sabotage in Black America and Bill Cosby's 2004 "Pound Cake speech" exemplified this critique, though their authors did not strictly come from the Black conservative movement. Lieutenant Governor of Oklahoma-elect T.W. Shannon stated that core values of black conservatism are, "The three C's. It's capitalism, it's the Constitution, and it's Christianity."

A 2007 Pew Research Center survey showed that 19% of Black Americans identified as Religious Right. In 2004, though, the Pew Research Center indicated only 7% of Black Americans identified as Republican.

A National Election Pool poll showed that support for California Proposition 8 (2008) (a state constitutional amendment defining marriage as an opposite-sex union) was strong among African-American voters; 70% of those interviewed in the exit poll—a higher percentage than any other racial group—stated that they voted in favor of Proposition 8. Polls by both the Associated Press and CNN mirrored this data, reporting support among Black voters to be at 70% and 75%, respectively. African-American support was considered crucial to the Proposition's passage because African Americans made up an unusually large percentage of voters in 2008; the presence of African-American presidential candidate Barack Obama on the ballot was believed to have increased African-American voter turnout.

In 2020, political commentator Larry Elder released the documentary Uncle Tom. This film argued for black conservatism and its values of personal responsibility, capitalism, the rejection of the 'victimhood narrative', and the promotion of the nuclear family. It featured people such as Robert Woodson, Stephen Broden, Jesse Lee Peterson, Herman Cain, Carol M. Swain, Allen West and Candace Owens, as well as archive footage of Ben Carson, Shelby Steele, and Thomas Sowell.

== History ==
From Reconstruction up until the New Deal, the black population tended to vote Republican. During that period, the Republican Party—particularly in the Southern United States—was seen as more racially progressive than the Democratic Party, primarily because of the role of the Southern wing of the Democratic Party (also known as the Dixiecrats) as the party of racial segregation.

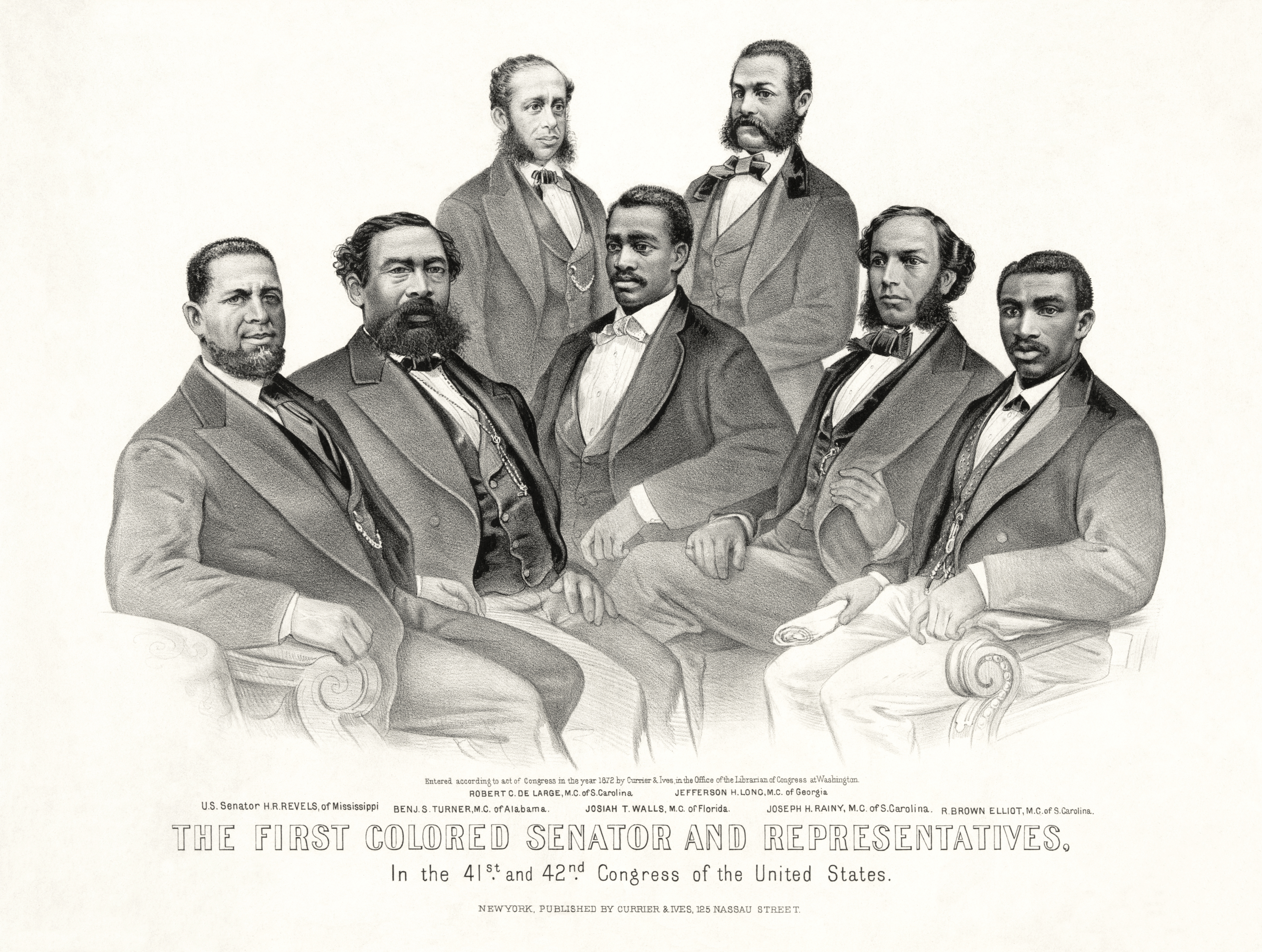
1872 Currier and Ives print showing the first black U.S. senator and representatives: Sen. Hiram Revels (R-MS), Rep. Benjamin S. Turner (R-AL), Robert DeLarge (R-SC), Josiah Walls (R-FL), Jefferson Long (R-GA), Joseph Rainey and Robert B. Elliott (R-SC), 1872

Following Reconstruction, African American influence in the Republican Party declined, especially in the South. Jim Crow laws and voter suppression tactics like poll taxes and literacy tests disenfranchised Black voters. Despite this, many African Americans remained loyal to the Republican Party.

Booker T. Washington had a more conservative approach to politics in the United States while W. E. B. DuBois called for more radical change.

Some African Americans supported Democrat Woodrow Wilson's first presidential campaign and felt betrayed by his policies once in office.

As the Republican party became more conservative, its association with African-American voters declined. Republican leader Herbert Hoover fired loyal African-Americans from positions within the Republican Party, in order to increase his appeal to Southern white voters. This can be considered an early example of a set of Republican Party methods that were later termed the Southern Strategy.

Blacks started to shift in significant numbers to the Democrats with the election of Franklin D. Roosevelt, who received 70% of the African-American vote. During his first two terms, civil rights legislation was not passed; however, New Deal programs led to the black vote becoming more split.

Among Truman Administration officials, the publication of Henry Lee Moon's Balance of Power spurred Democratic partisan support for African-American constituencies. Dwight D. Eisenhower was able to win back some African-American voters for the Republican party, receiving 40% of the black vote. John F. Kennedy's rebranding of the Democrats in 1960, including his embrace of civil rights, cemented the popularity of the party with African-Americans.

In 1960, the Kennedy-Johnson campaign promoted civil rights as a central issue and during their administration, they passed anti-discrimination legislation, gaining the black vote.

While in 1960, a third of African-Americans still supported the Republicans, the Barry Goldwater 1964 presidential campaign, which signalled the party's turn to conservatism, was based on a rejection of the Civil Rights Act of 1964 and led to rapid departure of most of the remaining third. "The 1964 election marked a watershed for African Americans and the GOP, with black Republican support now falling to around 10%." In 1960, the Kennedy-Johnson campaign promoted civil rights as a central issue and during their administration, they passed anti-discrimination legislation, gaining the black vote. Since then, the Democratic Party has held a majority of the black votes in America.

According to NPR’s Code Switch, Black conservatism as a movement emerged in the 1970s as a response to this: "Through an influential network of African-American conservative scholars and experts that emerged in the late 1970s, the Republicans sought to educate middle and upper blacks about the benefits of free-market socioeconomic policies... [The] African-American community perceived the new wave of black political conservatism not as an organic ideology that appeared at the grassroots level, but as a model imposed from above of the desired interracial relations in the country, from the point of view of white Americans."

African American voters in Presidential elections
Presidential Elections	Republican	Democrat
1980	17%	83%
1984	9%	91%
1988	11%	89%
1992	17%	83%
1996	16%	84%
2000	10%	90%
2004	12%	88%
2008	5%	95%
2012	7%	93%
2016	12%	88%
2020	13%	87%
2024	15%	85%

Alan Keyes became the first African-American candidate to run in the Republican presidential primaries in 1996, but he did not win any state's primary or caucus. Keyes ran for president again in 2000 this time placing third, garnering over 5% of the popular vote for the Republican nomination. He later unsuccessfully ran in the 2008 presidential election.

During the "Tea Party movement" in the Republican party, retired military officer Allen West and businessman Herman Cain rose to prominence. In 2010, West was elected to the US House, and Cain launch a 2012 presidential campaign that received a brief surge of attention and popularity. However, Cain withdrew before any primaries were held.

Neurosurgeon Ben Carson ran for the Republican nomination in the 2016 election. He polled well for a time in late 2015, but withdrew after the first Super Tuesday. Carson received 857,039 votes during the Republican primaries; this total represented 2.75% of the votes cast. He was supported by seven delegates at the Republican National Convention. Carson was later appointed Secretary of Housing and Urban Development by President Donald Trump.

Candace Owens

In 2018 political commentators Candace Owens and Brandon Tatum founded the BLEXIT Foundation to encourage African Americans to leave the Democratic Party and register as Republicans. In 2023, BLEXIT Foundation merged with Turning Point USA, a conservative non-profit organization for which Owens had formerly worked.

During the 2020s, Republicans have made inroads with African Americans which has translated to a growing number of Black Republican candidates. In 2020 Byron Donalds and Burgess Owens were elected to the US House, and in 2022 Wesley Hunt and John James were elected to the US House. This was a part of House Minority Leader Kevin McCarthy's goal of diversifying the Republican party. Similarly, Herschel Walker's 2022 US Senate campaign and Mark Robinson's 2024 gubernatorial campaign elevated Black voices within the party. However, controversies surrounding Walker and Robinson led to their defeat in their general elections. In 2026 a large number of black Republicans ran for statewide offices. Wesley Hunt of Texas, Daniel Cameron of Kentucky, and Royce White of Minnesota all ran for the U.S. Senate in their respective states but lost in the Republican primary. Byron Donalds of Florida, John James of Michigan, and Lisa Demuth of Minnesota were all the Republican nominees for governor in the respective states. However, Donalds was the only one to win in the general election.

== Timeline of events ==
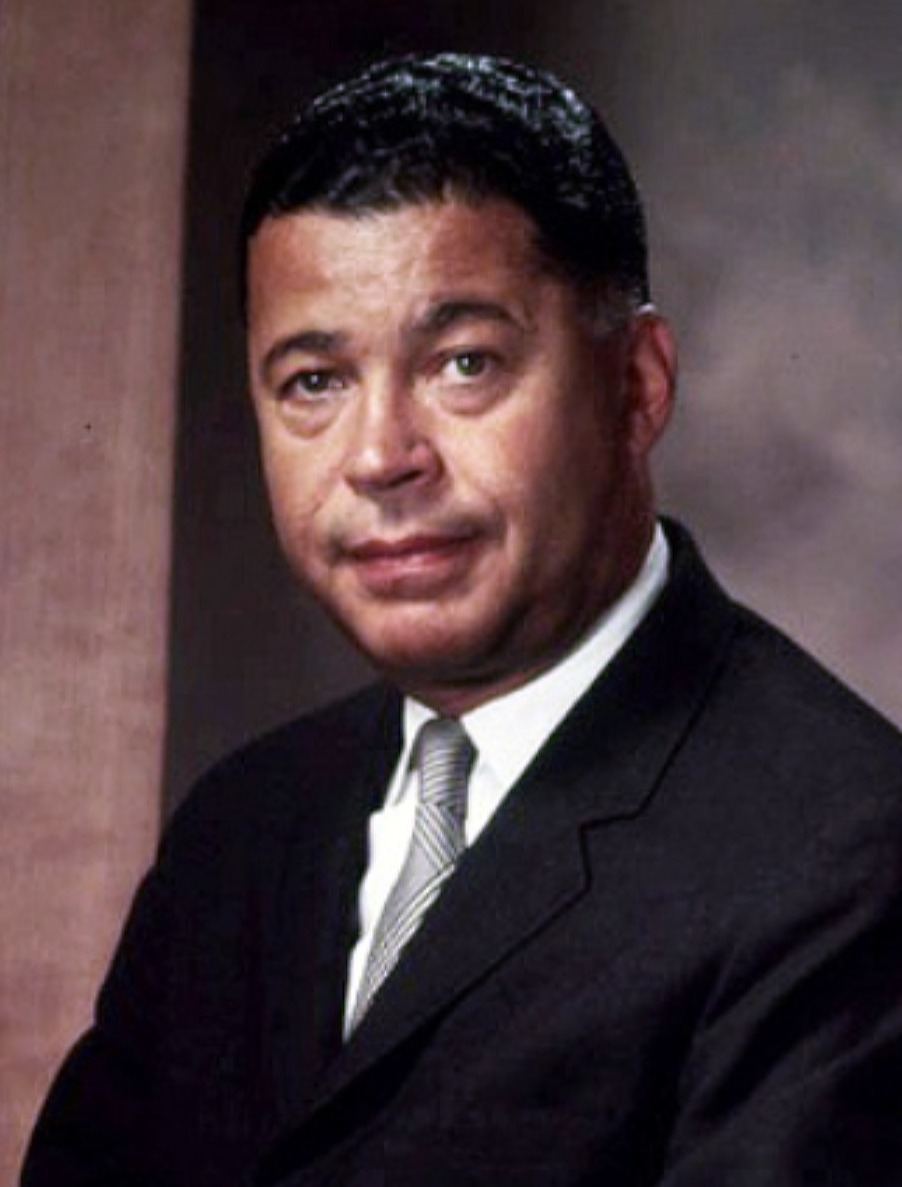
Edward Brooke, the first African American directly elected to the US Senate

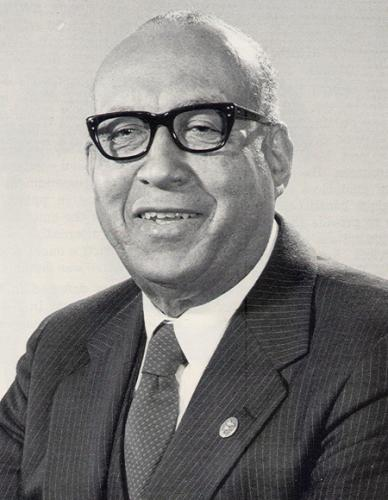
Melvin Evans, the first black person elected governor in US history

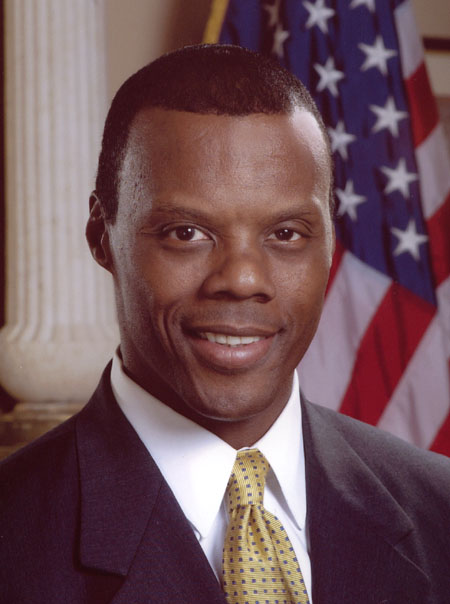
J.C. Watts, the first African American Republican to hold a leadership position in Congress

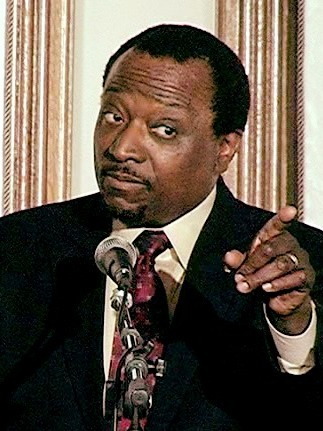
Alan Keyes, three time presidential candidate who garnered over 900,000 votes in 2000

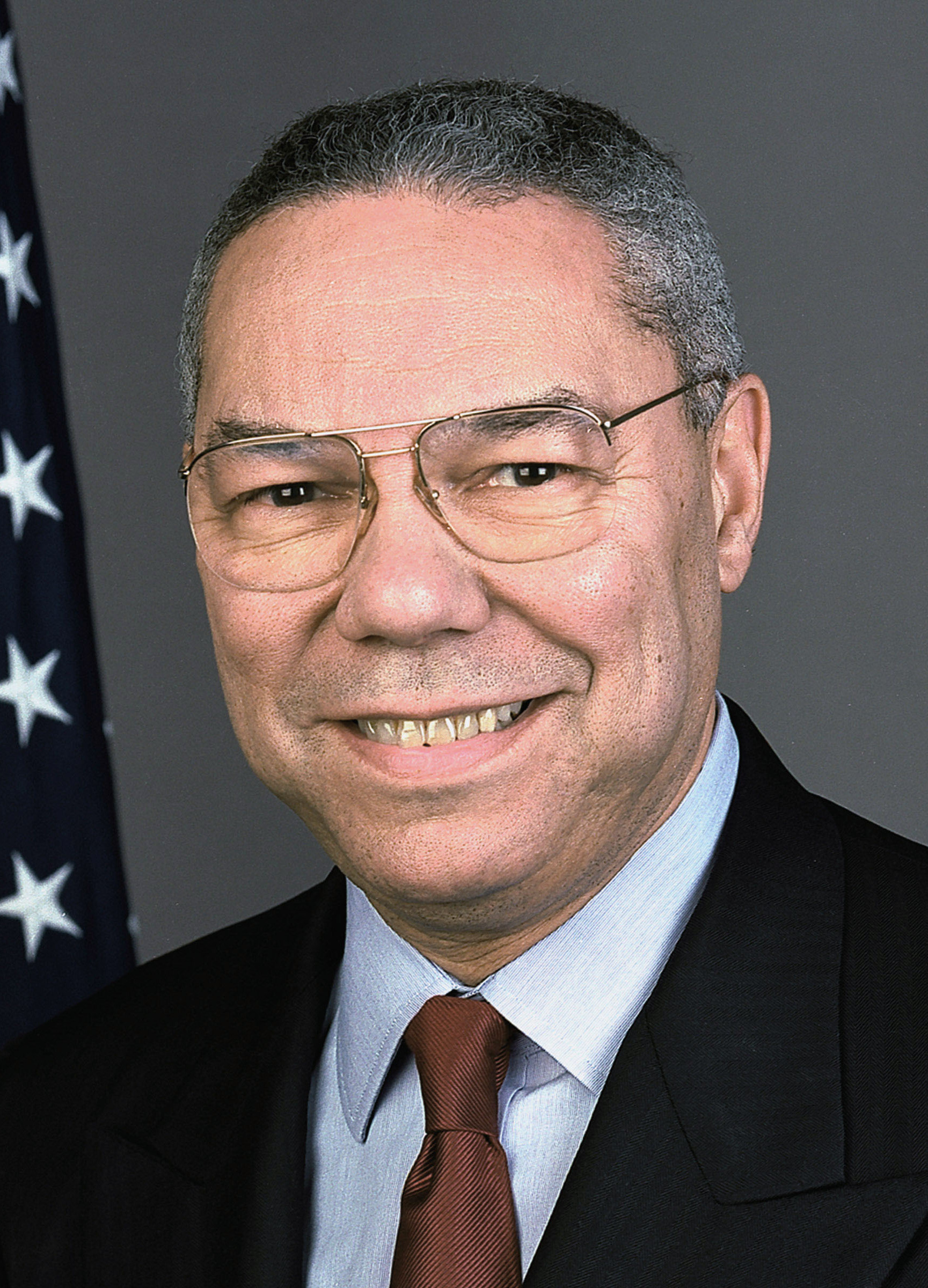
Colin Powell, the first African American US Secretary of State

Byron Donalds, the only African American Republican ever elected governor of a U.S. state

This is a timeline of significant events by African American conservatives that have shaped the conservative movement in the United States.

=== 1920s ===
- 1928 – Oscar Stanton de Priest is elected to the U.S. House of Representatives from Illinois's 1st congressional district

=== 1950s ===
- 1954 – Archie Alexander is appointed Civilian Governor of the U.S. Virgin Islands by President Dwight Eisenhower

=== 1960s ===
- 1966 - Edward Brooke is elected to the U.S. Senate from Massachusetts
- 1969 - Melvin H. Evans is appointed Civilian Governor of the U.S. Virgin Islands by President Richard Nixon

=== 1970s ===
- 1970 - Melvin H. Evans is elected Governor of the U.S. Virgin Islands
- 1975 – William T. Coleman is appointed United States Secretary of Transportation by President Gerald Ford
- 1978 – Melvin H. Evans is elected to the U.S. House of Representatives from the United States Virgin Islands' at-large congressional district (non voting delegate)

=== 1980s ===
- 1981 – Samuel Pierce is appointed United States Secretary of Housing and Urban Development by President Ronald Reagan
- 1989 – Louis Wade Sullivan is appointed United States Secretary of Health and Human Services by President George H. W. Bush

=== 1990s ===
- 1990 – Gary Franks is elected to the U.S. House of Representatives from Connecticut's 5th congressional district
- 1991 – Clarence Thomas is appointed to the Supreme Court of the United States by President George H. W. Bush
- 1994 – J. C. Watts elected to the U.S. House of Representatives from Oklahoma's 4th congressional district
- 1996 – Alan Keyes unsuccessfully sought the Republican presidential nomination
- 1997 - Congressman J.C. Watts delivers the Response to the State of the Union address of President Bill Clinton
- 1998 - Congressman J.C. Watts is elected Chair of the House Republican Conference

=== 2000s ===
- 2000 – Alan Keyes unsuccessfully sought the Republican presidential nomination receiving 985,819 votes.
- 2001 - Colin Powell is appointed United States Secretary of State by President George W. Bush
- 2001 - Rod Paige is appointed United States Secretary of Education by President George W. Bush
- 2004 – Alphonso Jackson is appointed United States Secretary of Housing and Urban Development by President George W. Bush
- 2005 – Condoleezza Rice is appointed United States Secretary of State by President George W. Bush
- 2008 – Alan Keyes unsuccessfully sought the Republican presidential nomination
- 2009 – Michael Steele is elected Chairman of the Republican National Committee

=== 2010s ===
- 2010 – Tim Scott is elected to the U.S. House of Representatives from South Carolina's 1st congressional district
- 2010 - Allen West is elected to the U.S. House of Representatives from Florida's 22nd congressional district
- 2012 - Herman Cain delivers the Tea Party Response to the State of the Union address of President Barack Obama
- 2012 – Herman Cain unsuccessfully sought the Republican presidential nomination
- 2013 – Tim Scott is appointed to the U.S. Senate by Governor Nikki Haley
- 2014 – Mia Love is elected to the U.S. House of Representatives from Utah's 4th congressional district becoming the only Republican Black woman elected to Congress
- 2014 - Will Hurd is elected to the U.S. House of Representatives from Texas' 23rd congressional district
- 2016 – Ben Carson unsuccessfully sought the Republican presidential nomination receiving 857,039 votes
- 2016 – Colin Powell receives three electoral votes for president from faithless electors
- 2017 – Ben Carson is appointed United States Secretary of Housing and Urban Development by President Donald Trump

=== 2020s ===
- 2020 – Burgess Owens is elected to the U.S. House of Representatives from Utah's 4th congressional district
- 2020 - Byron Donalds is elected to the U.S. House of Representatives from Florida's 19th congressional district
- 2021 - Senator Tim Scott delivers the Response to the State of the Union address of President Joe Biden
- 2022 – Wesley Hunt is elected to the U.S. House of Representatives from Texas's 38th congressional district
- 2022 - John James is elected to the U.S. House of Representatives from Michigan's 10th congressional district
- 2023 - Congressman Byron Donalds receives as many as 20 votes for Speaker of the U.S. House
- 2024 – Tim Scott, Larry Elder, and Will Hurd unsuccessfully sought the Republican presidential nomination
- 2024 - Senator Tim Scott is elected Chair of the National Republican Senatorial Committee and Chair of the Senate Banking Committee, becoming the first African-American to be a member of Republican Senate leadership and the first African-American senator to chair a full committee.
- 2025 – Scott Turner is appointed United States Secretary of Housing and Urban Development by President Donald Trump
- 2026 – Byron Donalds is elected Governor of Florida

== Notable people ==
=== Booker T. Washington ===
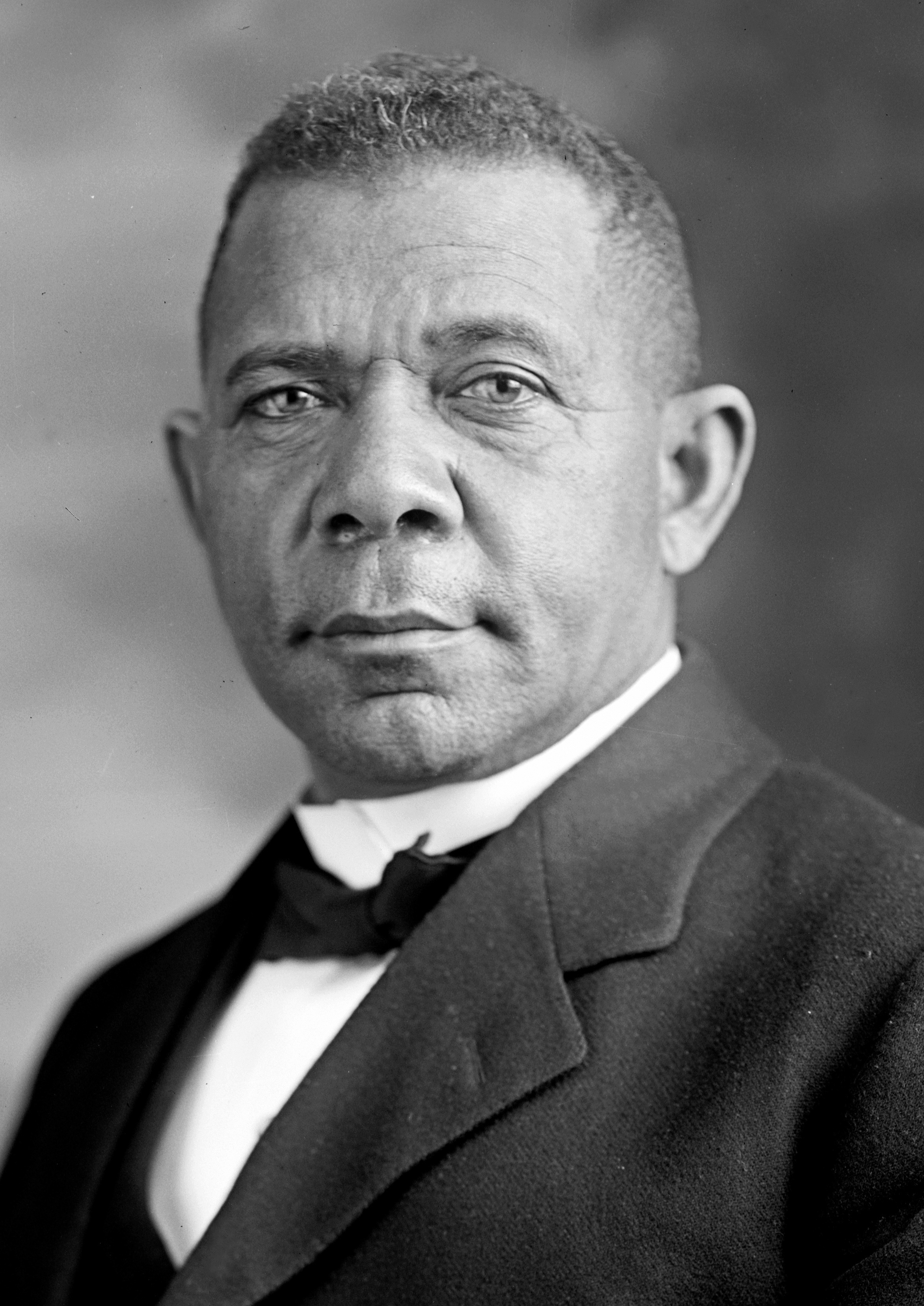

Booker T. Washington (1856–1915) was an educator, orator, and adviser to several presidents of the United States. Born into slavery, Washington later became the founder of the Tuskegee University and became one of the most influential African American leaders of the era. Washington famously became the first Black person to be entertained at the White House by President Theodore Roosevelt in 1901. His promotion of education, self-sufficiency, and community advancement has influenced generations of African American conservative thinkers.

=== Thomas Sowell ===
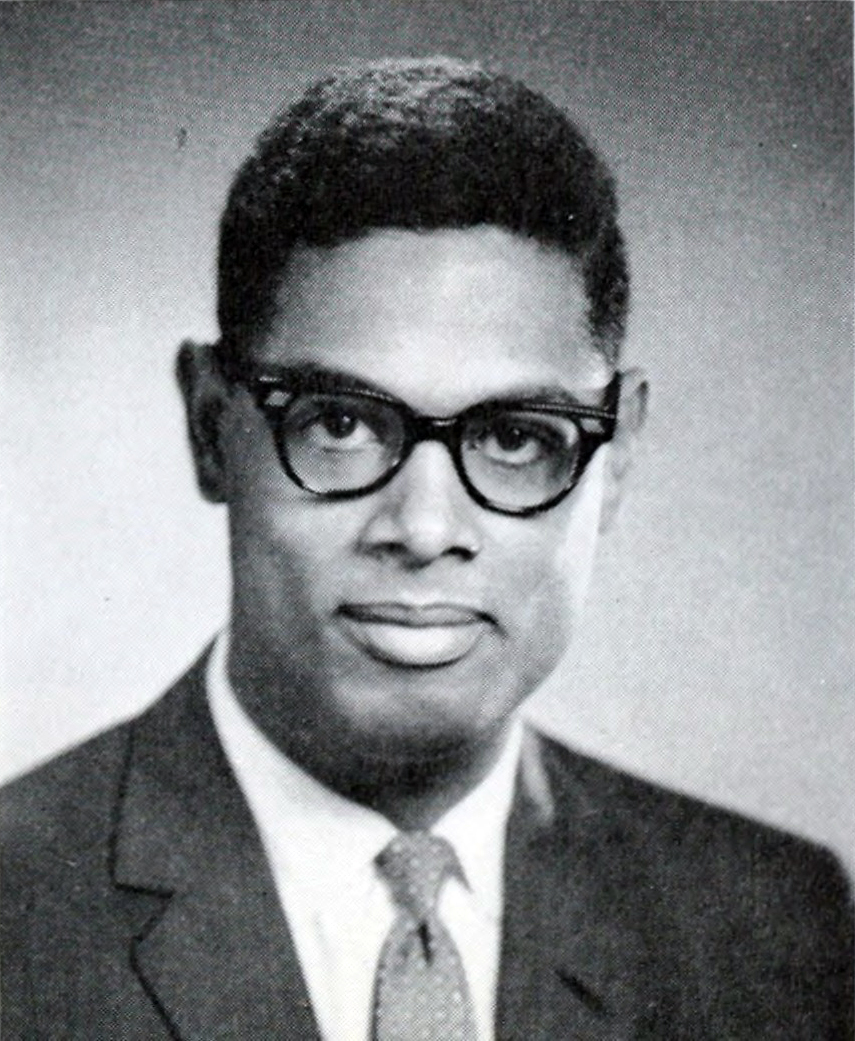

Thomas Sowell (born 1930) is an economist and social theorist who is widely regarded as one of the most influential African American conservative intellectuals. Born into immense poverty, Sowell dropped out of high school to work odd jobs and fight in the Korean War. He has written extensively in economics, education, culture, and public policy advocating for free markets, limited government, and individual responsibility. Though his books, essays, and decades of public commentary, Sowell has become a major influence on modern conservatism.

=== Clarence Thomas ===
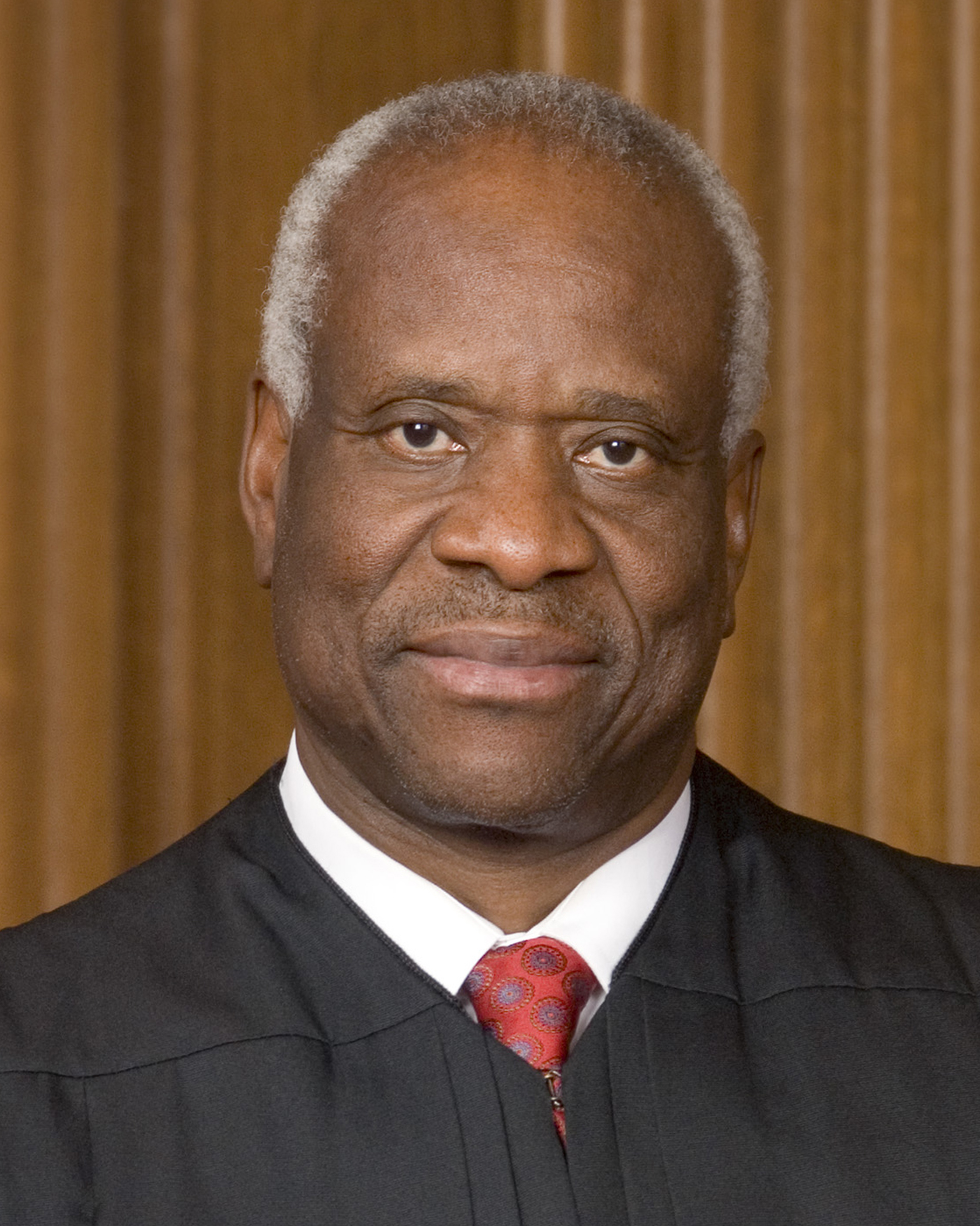

Clarence Thomas (born 1948) is a lawyer, jurist, and Associate Justice of the Supreme Court of the United States. Thomas was born into a poor Gullah community near Savannah, Georgia where he was raised by his grandmother. He is the second African American to ever serve on the United States Supreme Court and is known for his originalist approach to constitutional interpretation and his conservative legal philosophy. Thomas has been on the court when landmark decisions such as Dobbs v. Jackson Women's Health Organization, West Virginia v. EPA, Louisiana v. Callais, and Obergefell v. Hodges were made.

=== Condoleezza Rice ===
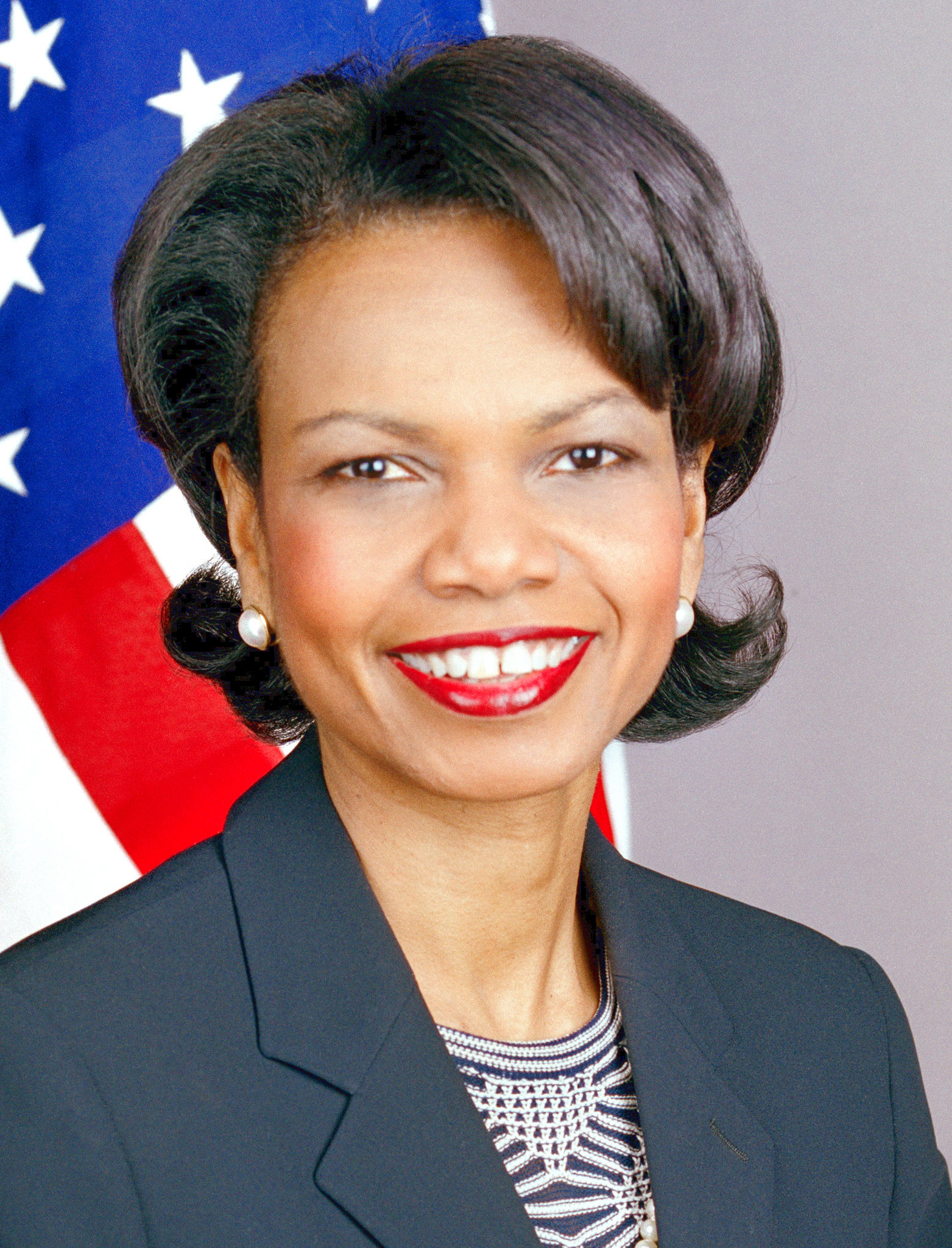

Condoleezza Rice (born 1954) is a political scientist and public official who became the first African American woman to serve as United States Secretary of State. Rice was born in Birmingham, Alabama, and grew up while the South was racially segregated. She also served as United States National Security Advisor from 2001 to 2005 and created Transformational Diplomacy. Rice also is currently the Director of the Hoover Institution, which is an American public policy think tank which promotes personal and economic liberty, free enterprise, and limited government. Her efforts in foreign policy and in public policy make her one of the most influential Republican African Americans.

=== Ben Carson ===
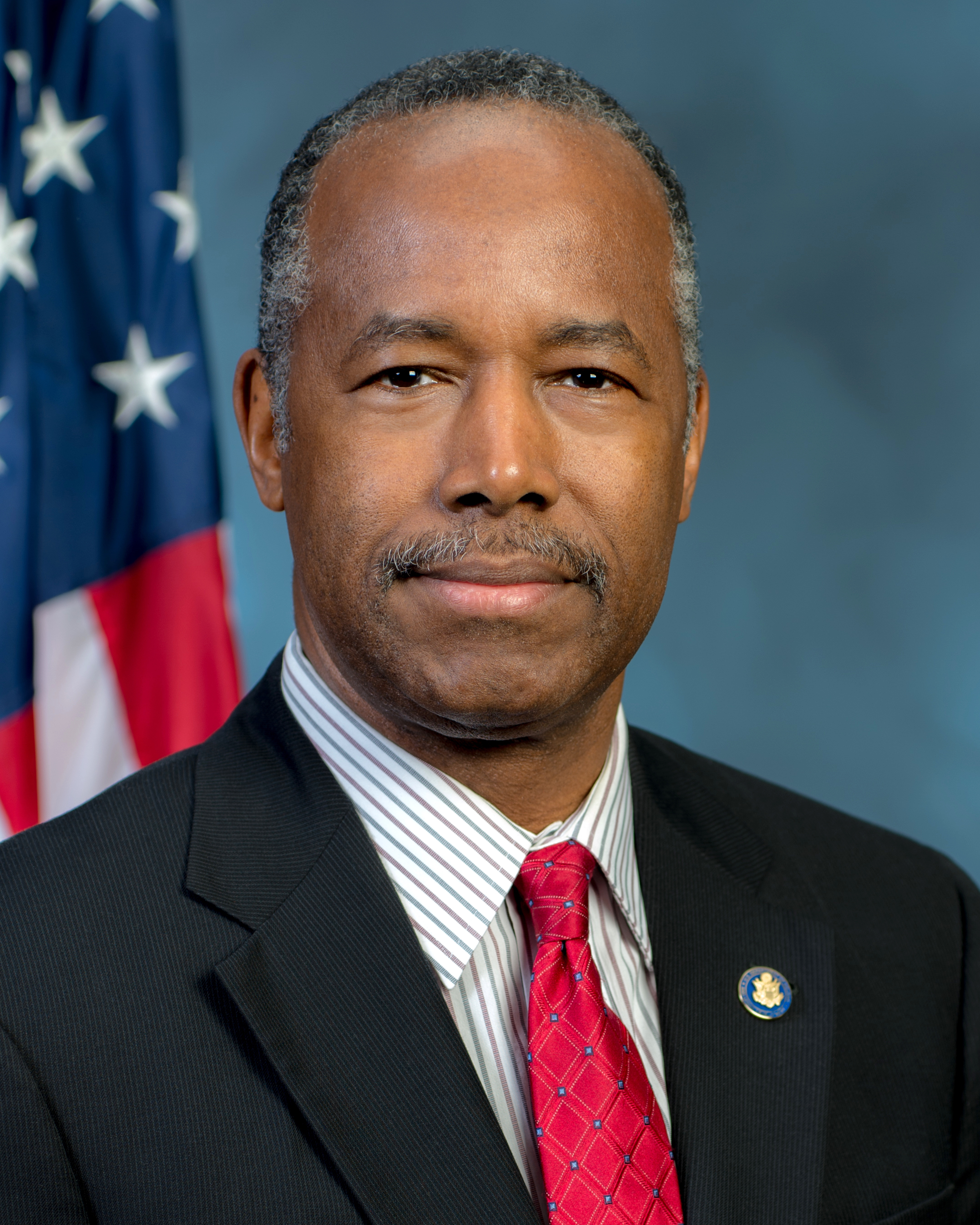

Ben Carson (born 1951) is a neurosurgeon and politician who became one of the most prominent conservative voices in the country because of his 2016 presidential campaign. Carson first gained fame through his career as a pioneering neurosurgeon who became the youngest chief of pediatric neurosurgery at Johns Hopkins Children's Center. He later entered politics as a Republican when he ran for president in 2016, garnering over 800,000 votes. He then was appointed United States Secretary of Housing and Urban Development by President Donald Trump. He currently serves at conservative think tanks, including the American Cornerstone Institute. Throughout his career he has advocated for education, personal responsibility, faith, and individual achievement.

=== Tim Scott ===
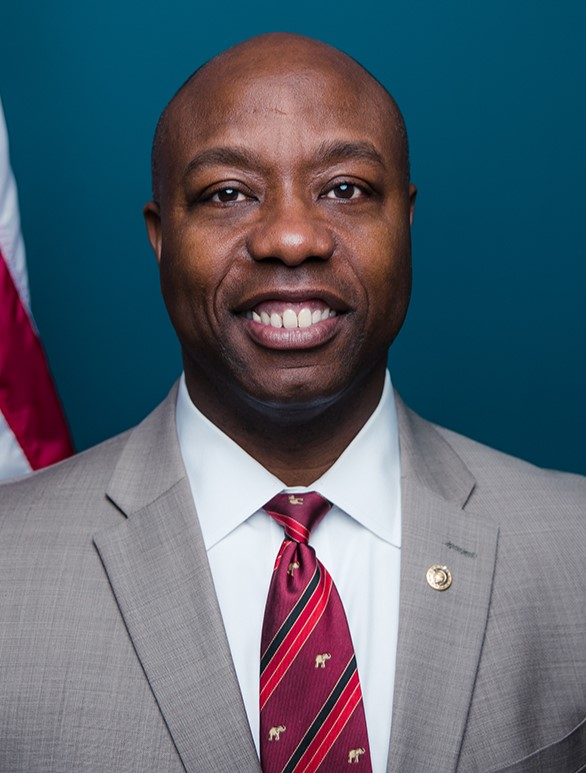

Tim Scott (born 1965) is a politician who has served as a United States Senator from South Carolina since 2013, making him the first African American senator elected from the South since Reconstruction. Scott grew up in working-class poverty with a single mother, who often worked double shifts to support her family. A Republican, Scott previously served as a member of the U.S. House and as a member of the South Carolina House before he was appointed to the U.S. Senate by Governor Nikki Haley. In 2021 Scott delivered the Response to the State of the Union address of President Joe Biden. In 2024 Scott unsuccessfully ran for President of the United States. He is currently the longest serving African American Senator, the first African American senator to chair a full committee, and the Chair of the National Republican Senatorial Committee.

== Organizations ==
- American Civil Rights Institute
- Project 21
- Coalition on Urban Renewal and Education
- Congress of Racial Equality
- Joint Center for Political and Economic Studies
- National Black Republican Association

== See also ==
- African-American leftism
- Hip Hop Republican
- Conservative Democrat
- African Americans in the United States Congress
- List of minority governors and lieutenant governors in the United States
- Hispanic and Latino Conservatism in the United States
- The Colored Patriots of the American Revolution
- Asian American and Pacific Islands American conservatism in the United States
- List of African-American Republicans
- Ethnocultural politics in the United States
- Negro Republican Party
- Readjuster Party
- Black-and-tan faction

== Further reading and listening ==
- Blain, Charles J., "Black Churches Can't Stand Strong If They Keep Democrats as Their Platform" (2017)
- Lewis, Angela K. (2005). "Black conservatism in America". Journal of African American Studies. 8 (4): 3–13.
- Murray, Mark. "GOP diversity aims at a crucial Democratic bloc. NBC News. April 25, 2006.
- "The New Black Republicans." WBUR, June 2, 2004.
