= JLP =

JLP may refer to:

== Organisations ==
- Jamaica Labour Party, one of the two major political parties in Jamaica
- John Lewis Partnership, a British retail company

== Individuals ==
- Jesse Lee Peterson, American conservative talk show host
- Jonathan LaPaglia, Australian actor and television personality

== Music ==
- Jagged Little Pill, album by Alanis Morissette

== Transport ==
- Jelapang LRT station (LRT station abbreviation), Singapore

== Other ==
- Japanese logistics pressurized, one section of the International Space Station's Kibo module
- Japanese-Language Proficiency Test, commonly abbreviated as either JLP or JLPT
