= Michael & Me =

- DVD cover
- Directed by: Larry Elder
- Written by: Larry Elder
- Produced by: Larry Elder
- Starring: Larry Elder; Michael Moore
- Cinematography: Carl Bartels
- Edited by: Sal Martino
- Music by: David Siebels
- Release dates: September 9, 2004 (Dallas American Film Renaissance Festival); August 2, 2005 (United States)
- Running time: 90 minutes
- Country: United States
- Language: English

Michael & Me is an independent, self-financed 2005 American documentary film created by Los Angeles–based radio and television talk show host Larry Elder. The direct-to-DVD documentary attempts to disprove statements made by filmmaker Michael Moore in his 2002 documentary film Bowling for Columbine about the relationship between American culture, gun ownership and increased violence. The documentary mirrors Moore's landmark 1989 documentary, Roger & Me, in tone and interview style. The film is frequently presented at conservative film festivals.

== Overview ==
In Michael & Me, Elder interviews people who have used guns to prevent becoming a victim of crime to provide evidence that an armed society is a safer society. For example, Elder interviews a woman identified as "Jane Doe," a real estate agent who was raped by a client. Elder states that the victim "would have been able to protect herself" were she armed.

== Production notes ==
In an August 2005 interview on Hannity & Colmes, Elder stated that he took out a home equity loan to finance the documentary's estimated $350,000 budget.
