= KQEQ =

Radio station in Fowler, California

- Fresno, California; United States
- Broadcast area: Fresno area
- Frequency: 1210 kHz

Programming
- Format: South Asian

Ownership
- Owner: Charanjit Singh Batth; (Akal Broadcasting Corporation)

History
- First air date: 1962
- Former call signs: KLIP (1962–1989); KRGO (1989–1995)

Technical information
- Licensing authority: FCC
- Facility ID: 33252
- Class: B
- Power: 5,000 watts (day); 370 watts (night)
- Transmitter coordinates: 36°46′13.8″N 119°55′23.5″W (day); 36°39′36.8″N 119°41′4.5″W (night)

Links
- Public license information: Public file; LMS
- Website: radiopunjab.ca

KQEQ (1210 AM) is a South Asian radio station licensed to Fowler, California, United States, and serving the Fresno area. The station focuses on the local Indian and Pakistani communities, calling itself "Radio Punjab." On May 27, 2015, Spice Radio purchased the station from RAK Communications for $750,000. The purchase was consummated on November 25, 2015.

== History ==
The station went on the air as KLIP in 1962. It broadcast on 1220 kHz after KRDU moved to 1130. Morris Mindel owned the station until his 1977 death; two years later, his estate sold the station to Frontier Communications, Inc. The call letters were changed to KRGO on March 20, 1989. On April 1, 1995, the station changed its call sign to KQEQ. The Hmong Radio (New Wave Broadcasting) Laotian language and Hmong language programming to serve America's largest Hmong and Laotian community. In September 2010, it was announced on the radio that the station was going to change to KGED 1680 AM in order to reach Hmong residents of Bakersfield and San Francisco more easily. From 2013–present KQEQ was a Spanish Christian format called Radio Guadalupe La Misionera 1210 AM.
