= KGED =

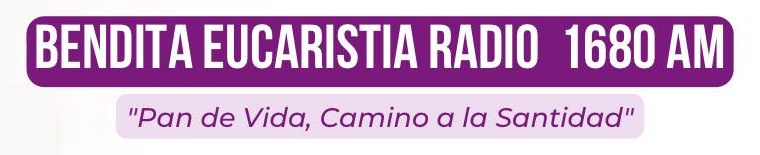
- Fresno, California; United States
- Broadcast area: Fresno County
- Frequency: 1680 kHz

Programming
- Format: Regional Mexican

Ownership
- Owner: Bendita Eucaristia Radio, Inc.

History
- First air date: October 2000
- Former call signs: KAVT (1998–2008)

Technical information
- Licensing authority: FCC
- Facility ID: 87176
- Class: B
- Power: 10,000 watts (day); 1,000 watts (night)
- Transmitter coordinates: 36°39′36.8″N 119°41′4.5″W

Links
- Public license information: Public file; LMS
- Webcast: Listen Live
- Website: benditaeucaristiaradio.org

KGED (1680 kHz) is a commercial AM expanded band radio station in Fresno, California. It features a regional Mexican format. The station is owned by Bendita Eucaristia Radio, Inc. The studios and offices are on West Olive Avenue in Fresno.

KGED broadcasts with 10,000 watts by day and 1,000 watts at night, using a non-directional antenna. The transmitter is located off South Fowler Avenue, near East American Avenue, in Fowler, California, south of Fresno.

== Previous talk programming ==
KGED previously had local hosts on weekday afternoons. From the Salem Radio Network, KGED aired syndicated talk shows from Hugh Hewitt, Eric Metaxas, Larry Elder and Dennis Prager. Other syndicated shows heard on KGED include Dave Ramsey, Alex Jones and "America's Morning News" with Matt Ray. KGED carried college football and basketball from the Fresno Pacific Sunbirds. Most hours began with world and national news from ABC News Radio. It also carried reports from the California News Network.

== History ==
KGED originated as the expanded band "twin" of an existing station on the standard AM band.

On March 17, 1997, the Federal Communications Commission (FCC) announced that eighty-eight stations had been given permission to move to newly available "Expanded Band" transmitting frequencies, ranging from 1610 to 1700 kHz, with KXEX, also in Fresno, authorized to move from 1550 to 1680 kHz. A Construction Permit for the expanded band station was assigned the call letters KAVT on January 9, 1998. The FCC's initial policy was that both the original station and its expanded band counterpart could operate simultaneously for up to five years, after which owners would have to turn in one of the two licenses, depending on whether they preferred the new assignment or elected to remain on the original frequency. However, this deadline has been extended multiple times, and both stations have remained authorized. One restriction is that the FCC has generally required paired original and expanded band stations to remain under common ownership.

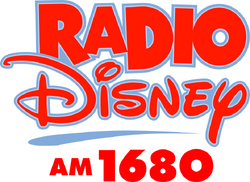
KAVT logo used from 2002 until 2007.

KAVT signed on in October 2000. At its inception, the station was a Radio Disney network affiliate, carrying its children's/contemporary hit radio format, and was owned by the RAK Corporation, and the station began broadcasting in C-QUAM AM stereo. On March 1, 2008, the call letters switched to KGED, and it carried an adult standards format provided by Dial Global.

The standards format was replaced in September 2008, by a Spanish Christian radio format.

In October 2011, KGED 1680 re-launched with a conservative talk radio format with mostly syndicated talk personalities from the Salem Radio Network.

On May 1, 2020, KGED's talk format moved to KXEX 1550 AM Fresno, and 1680 AM switched to regional Mexican.
