= Commission on the Social Status of Black Men and Boys =

American commission

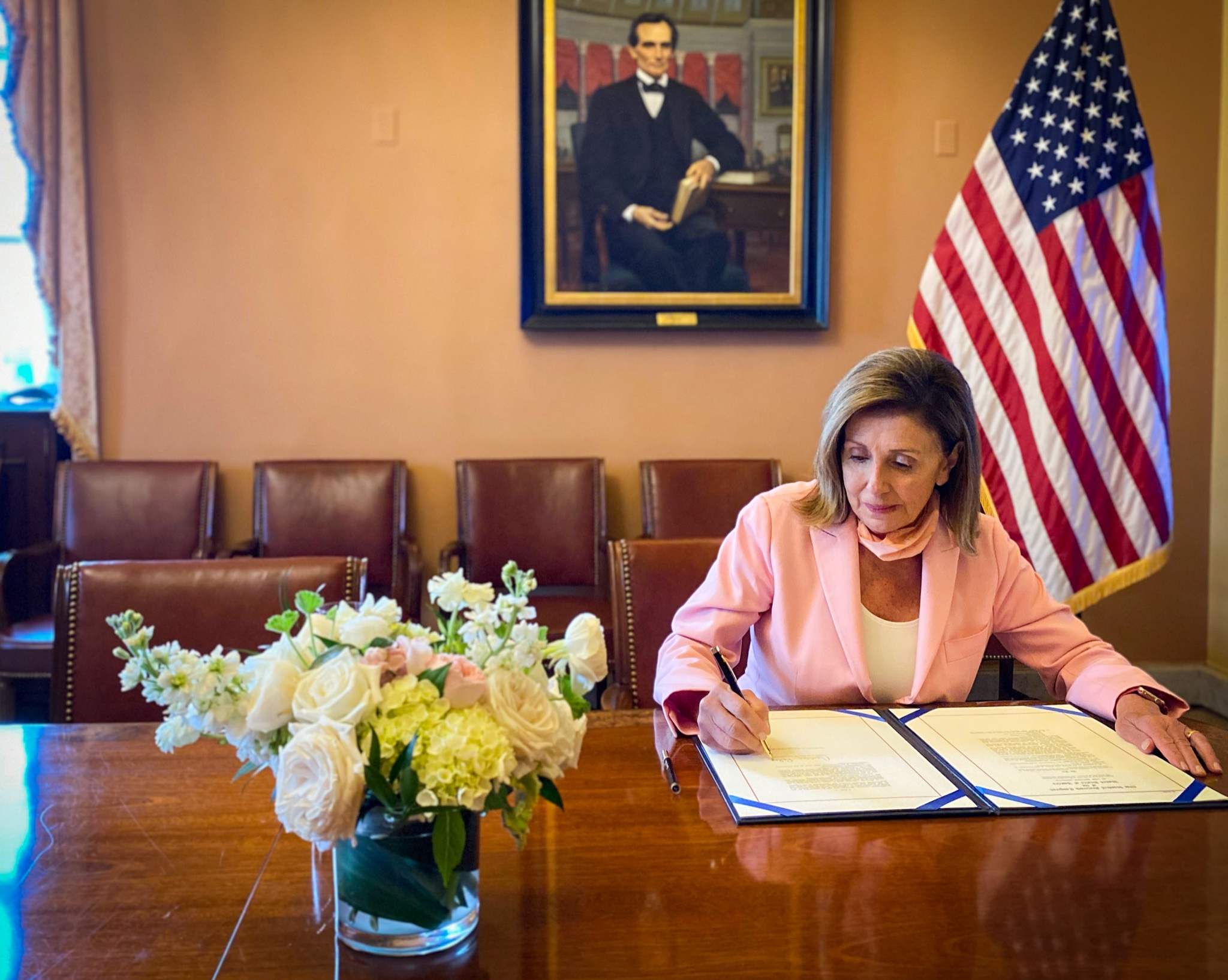
Speaker of the House Nancy Pelosi signs Representative Frederica S. Wilson's landmark legislation creating a commission on the social status of Black men and boys nationwide to send to the President’s desk.

The Commission on the Social Status of Black Men and Boys (CSSBMB) is a bipartisan, independent commission of the United States government, created in 2020, it is tasked with recommending policies to improve upon, or augment, current government programs. Established within the United States Commission on Civil Rights’ (USCCR) Office of the Staff Director and The CSSBMB will investigate potential civil rights violations affecting black males and study the disparities they experience in education, criminal justice, health, employment, fatherhood, mentorship, and violence. The CSSBMB will be responsible for producing an annual report to address the current conditions affecting black men and boys and make recommendations to improve the social conditions and provide vital guidance for Congress on effective strategies to reduce the racial disparities in education, criminal justice, health, and employment.

The authorizing legislation H.R. 1636 was introduced in the House by Congresswoman Frederica S. Wilson (D-FL) and Sen. Marco Rubio (R-FL) introduced S.2163 in the Senate. The Senate bill was unanimously passed on June 25, 2020 and enacted into law on August 14, 2020.

== Vision ==
As a non-partisan federal agency, the Commission leads a national discussion to address the complexity and nuances of the varying conditions affecting Black males in the history of America’s cultural landscape.

== Mission ==
- To conduct a systematic study of the conditions affecting Black men and boys, including homicide rates, arrest and incarceration rates, poverty, violence, fatherhood, mentorship, drug abuse, death rates, disparate income and wealth levels, school performance in all grade levels including postsecondary education and college, and health issues.
- To examine trends regarding Black males and report on the community impacts of relevant government programs within the scope such topics.
- To propose measures to alleviate and remedy the underlying causes of the conditions described in the statute, which may include recommendations of changes to the law, recommendations for how to implement related policies, and recommendations for how to create, develop, or improve upon government programs.

== Commissioners ==
The bipartisan, 19-member Commission will include congressional lawmakers, executive branch appointees, issue experts, activists, and other stakeholders who will examine social disparities affecting black men and boys in America. Based on its findings, the commission will issue policy recommendations to Congress, the White House, and federal agencies. The bipartisan, bicameral Caucus on the Social Status of Black Men and Boys, which Congresswoman Wilson founded and co-chairs, will craft legislation to implement those recommendations.

On November 9, 2021, Representative Frederica S. Wilson was elected Chair of the Commission. The Reverend Al Sharpton was elected as Secretary.

Member	Appointed By
Reverend Al Sharpton	The Honorable Charles Schumer, Senate Majority Leader
Dr. O.J. Oleka	The Honorable Mitch McConnell, Senate Minority Leader
Dr. Joseph E. Marshall, Jr.	The Honorable Nancy Pelosi, Speaker of The House
Marshall Dillard	The Honorable Kevin McCarthy, House Minority Leader
The Honorable Joyce Beatty (D-OH03)	Chair of the Congressional Black Caucus
The Honorable Frederica S. Wilson (D-FL24)	Member of the Congressional Black Caucus
The Honorable Hakeem Jeffries (D-NY08)	Member of the Congressional Black Caucus
The Honorable Steven Horsford (D-NV04)	Member of the Congressional Black Caucus
The Honorable Lucy McBath (D-GA06)	Member of the Congressional Black Caucus
The Honorable Jamaal Bowman (D-NY16)	Member of the Congressional Black Caucus
Gerald Fosten	Mauro Morales, Staff Director of the U.S. Commission on Civil Rights
Thomas M. Colclough	The Honorable Charlotte Burrows, Chair of U.S. Equal Employment Opportunity Commission
Christian Rhodes	The Honorable Miguel Cardona, Secretary of Education
The Honorable Kristen Clarke	The Honorable Merrick Garland, Attorney General of the Department of Justice
Dr. LaShawn McIver	The Honorable Xavier Becerra, Secretary of Health and Human Services
Dr. Calvin Johnson	The Honorable Marcia L. Fudge, Secretary of the Department of Housing and Urban Development
Richard Cesar	The Honorable Marty Walsh, Secretary of the Department of Labor
Jack Brewer	The Honorable Donald Trump, President of the United States
Laurence Elder	The Honorable Donald Trump, President of the United States
