= Jesse Lee Peterson =

American radio and TV host and political commentator (born 1949)

The Reverend Jesse Lee Peterson
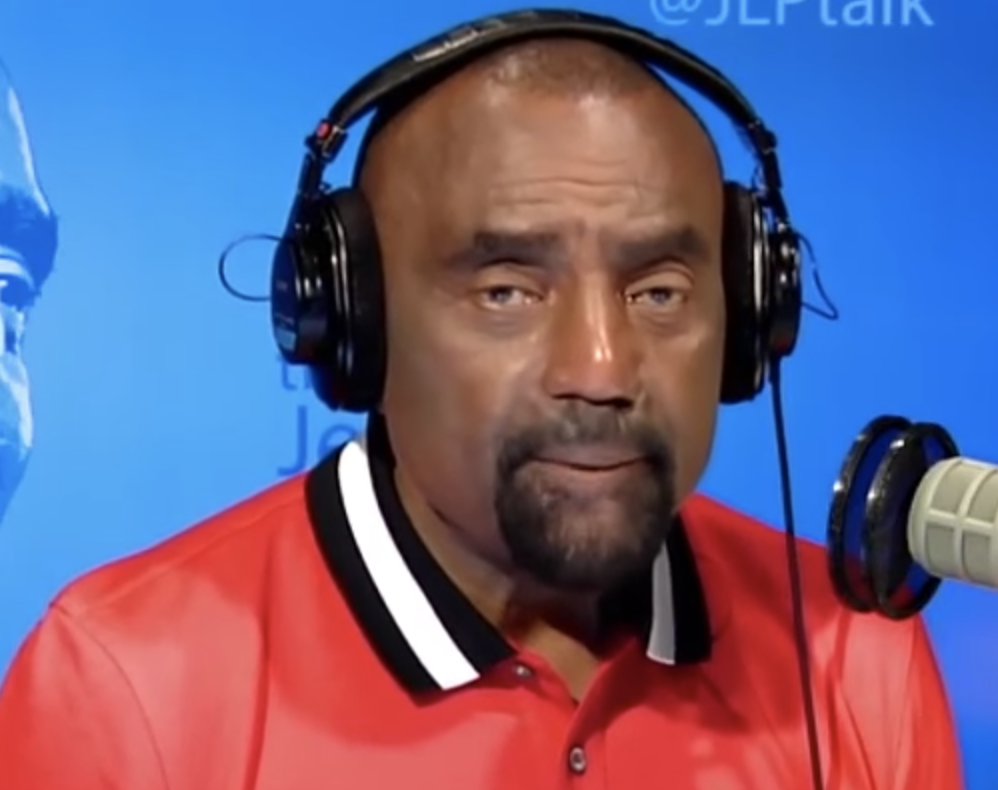
- Peterson in 2018
- Born: May 22, 1949 (age 77); Midway, Alabama, U.S.
- Occupations: Radio host, political commentator, minister
- Political party: Republican
- Other political affiliations: Democratic (formerly)
- Children: 1
- Peterson's voice His beliefs on what the order of society is meant to be
- Website: jesseleepeterson.com

Jesse Lee Peterson (born May 22, 1949) is an American radio host, political commentator, Christian minister, and conservative activist. In 1990, he founded the Brotherhood Organization of a New Destiny (BOND), a religious nonprofit that later developed ties to the Tea Party movement. His radio program was simulcast on Newsmax TV from 2017 to 2018, and he has written several books on race, politics, religion and personal responsibility.

Peterson was born in Midway, Alabama, and raised by his grandparents in rural Alabama on the plantation where his great-grandparents had been enslaved. He later moved to Los Angeles. Peterson has described a spiritual transformation in his thirties, after which he became increasingly involved in conservative politics and Christian ministry. He says that he was formerly a Democrat but became a Republican in his late thirties, attributing the change to his Christian beliefs.

Peterson's activism and commentary have focused on race, immigration, abortion, gun control, religion, and gender. He has said that racism does not exist, opposed allowing Muslims to serve in Western governments, criticized Black History Month and Kwanzaa, and argued that allowing women to vote was one of the United States' greatest mistakes. Some authors have described his views and rhetoric as consistent with white supremacy or as useful to white nationalists. In 2018, after Peterson compared the Black Lives Matter movement to the Ku Klux Klan and made remarks about its founders, Good Morning Britain host Piers Morgan accused him of homophobia and ended the interview. In 2022, Peterson spoke at the America First Political Action Conference, which the Anti-Defamation League described as a white nationalist event; the organization characterized his address as one of the most racist speeches delivered there.

== Early life ==
Jesse Lee Peterson was born on May 22, 1949, in Midway, Alabama, and raised in the rural community of Comer Hill by his grandparents, who worked on the same plantation where his great-grandparents had been enslaved. His early life was marked by familial fragmentation—his mother and father both relocated north, starting new families in Indiana, while Peterson remained in Alabama under the stern discipline of his grandfather. His family history marred by racial violence, including the lynching of his great-grandfather, Peterson recalls being taught moral resilience over resentment, emphasizing spiritual integrity rather than racial animus.

Peterson was born with a cleft palate that was not repaired until his teens. Peterson lived with his mother and stepfather in Gary, Indiana. Following high school graduation, he relocated to Los Angeles, where he briefly attended Los Angeles City College but soon became immersed in the counterculture of the 1960s. During this period, Peterson subsisted on welfare by falsely claiming drug addiction and spiraled into a lifestyle of idleness, substance abuse, and racial hostility—attributes he later characterized as "self-destructive." Influenced initially by the rhetoric of Louis Farrakhan, Peterson embraced black identity politics and developed animosity toward whites; however, a pivotal transformation occurred in his thirties after encountering the teachings of radio preacher Roy Masters, whose emphasis on introspective prayer and spiritual self-examination prompted Peterson to confront his anger—not at society, but at his own parents. Through acts of forgiveness toward both his mother and father, Peterson experienced what he described as a "spiritual awakening." In 1989, Peterson launched a janitorial business in Los Angeles, beginning his shift from welfare dependency to entrepreneurship.

== Political involvement ==
In 1990, Peterson founded BOND (Brotherhood Organization of a New Destiny), later registered as a religious non-profit. BOND had close ties to the Tea Party movement. Advisory board members have included conservative talk radio hosts Sean Hannity and Dennis Prager. Peterson has participated in activism against illegal immigration, abortion, gun control, and for traditional family values. He has protested against the NAACP, as well as feminist lawyer Gloria Allred. He has participated in discussions at the annual political convention Politicon.

In 2000, Peterson introduced Pat Buchanan's vice presidential running mate, Ezola Foster—a conservative black woman who worked in Los Angeles public schools for 33 years—at the contested Reform Party national convention. In the speech, Peterson warned the audience, "You'd have to be blind, crippled and crazy to send your child to the public school system." During the speech, he also stated that "most black people—not all but most—have been taught to love evil and hate good."

From 1999 to 2004, Peterson chose Martin Luther King Jr. Day to hold a "National Day of Repudiation of Jesse Jackson" to highlight his opposition to Jackson, who was near King when he was assassinated. In 2001, while meeting with Toyota executives in Los Angeles, Peterson accused Jackson of threatening him and accused Jackson's son, Jonathan Jackson, of assaulting him. In 2006, a jury cleared Jesse Jackson of the threat allegation, but was split on his son's assault allegation. Conservative activist organization Judicial Watch provided attorneys for Peterson in the lawsuit. In 2002, Peterson debated Michael Eric Dyson on "The Case For/Against Reparations for blacks," hosted by the National Association of Black Journalists.

Prager wrote the forewords to two of Peterson's books. Peterson's radio show was simulcast on Newsmax TV in 2017–2018. In June 2019, video-sharing platform YouTube demonetized Peterson's channel, amongst many others, under an updated hate speech policy. Peterson appeared in the 2020 political documentary Uncle Tom, produced by radio host Larry Elder.

== Political views ==
Peterson has stated that he used to be a Democrat but became a Republican in his late 30s. He attributed the change to his Christian beliefs.

=== Race ===
Peterson opposes allowing Muslims to serve in Western governments, and says that racism does not exist. Instead, he believes that every conflict is a spiritual "battle between good and evil." He has spoken out against Kwanzaa and Black History Month. Peterson's views have been described by some authors as being consistent with white supremacy, and it has been suggested that white nationalists are encouraged by his rhetoric and compelled to promote him, because Peterson's blackness reduces the shock value of opinions that would be considered outrageous if a white person had expressed them.

In 2005, Peterson stated that most blacks stranded in New Orleans during Hurricane Katrina were relying on the government to save them. In 2012, Peterson said about black unemployment, "One of the things that I would do is take all black people back to the South and put them on the plantation ... They need a good hard education on what it is to work." He has called Nelson Mandela an "evil man" and said that South Africa was better off under apartheid. Since 2020, he has called U.S. President Donald Trump "the Great White Hope."

In 2013, Peterson called Trayvon Martin a "thug." CNN host Piers Morgan called Peterson's comments "quite offensive." In 2015, on political commentator Sean Hannity's show, Peterson defended Michael Slager, a former North Charleston, South Carolina, police officer who killed Walter Lamar Scott, an unarmed black man, by shooting him in the back; in 2017, he was sentenced to 20 years in prison for the killing. Peterson criticized "angry black folks in this country" who disobey instructions of police, while Hannity pushed back against Peterson and called the killing "cold-blooded." Fellow panelist Leo Terrell walked out of the interview prematurely.

In 2018, Peterson compared the Black Lives Matter movement to the Ku Klux Klan, saying that each could be described as an "agitative organization founded by ... black lesbians and homosexuals." In response, Good Morning Britain host Piers Morgan accused Peterson of homophobia, and Peterson's microphone was muted before he was kicked off the show. In 2019, Peterson called activist Andrew Yang a "communist" and "beta male" for his universal basic income proposal. Peterson said Yang, an American born in New York, "should go back to China or wherever he came from." In 2022, Peterson gave a speech at the third America First Political Action Conference (AFPAC), which was organised by Nick Fuentes and attended by Marjorie Taylor Greene. AFPAC is described by the Anti-Defamation League as a white nationalist political action committee. The league's report on the event described Peterson's speech as "one of the most racist" of all delivered at the event, in which he described black people as the destroyers of America.

=== Marriage and women ===
Peterson opposes premarital sex. During an interview with former SlutWalk organizer Amber Rose, Peterson responded to the question "if women are sluts what does that make you?" by stating men are "slutmakers." Peterson's views on women have been described by critics as misogynistic. Peterson stated in a 2012 sermon that "one of the greatest mistakes America made was to allow women the opportunity to vote." He stated that women "can't handle power in the right way," that they "have no patience," and "don't have love." Political analyst Kirsten Powers confronted Peterson on Sean Hannity's program on Fox News, accusing him of using his status as a pastor to preach hatred and fear of women.

== Personal life ==
Peterson has one son. He has been engaged twice but never married.

== Published works ==
- From Rage to Responsibility: Black Conservative Jesse Lee Peterson and America Today, with Dennis Prager and Brad Stetson. Paragon House, 2000, ISBN 1-55778-788-3
- SCAM: How the Black Leadership Exploits Black America, WND Books, ISBN 0-7852-6331-4. Reprinted, Thomas Nelson, 2005, ISBN 978-1595550453
- The Seven Guaranteed Steps to Spiritual, Family and Financial Success, 2007.
- The ANTIDOTE: Healing America from the Poison of Hate, Blame and Victimhood, WND Books, ISBN 978-1-942475-00-2 (hardcover), 2015.
