= Uncle Tom (film) =

- Official movie poster featuring Larry Elder
- Directed by: Justin Malone
- Written by: Ryder Ansell; Larry Elder; Justin Malone
- Produced by: Ryder Ansell
- Cinematography: Justin Malone
- Edited by: Justin Malone
- Music by: Damon Criswell
- Production company: Malone Pictures
- Release date: June 19, 2020 (US)
- Running time: 106 minutes
- Country: United States
- Language: English

Uncle Tom: An Oral History of the American Black Conservative is a 2020 American political documentary film directed by Justin Malone, written by Ryder Ansell, Larry Elder, Justin Malone, with Elder as executive producer, and starring Chad O. Jackson. The documentary features interviews with people such as Robert Woodson, Stephen Broden, Jesse Lee Peterson, Herman Cain, Carol M. Swain, Allen West and Candace Owens, as well as archive footage of Ben Carson, Shelby Steele, and Thomas Sowell. Elder, who helped write the film, hoped it would promote conservative views in the 2020 presidential election.

== Contents ==
The documentary collects interviews with a number of black conservative thinkers in the United States who question how the black population have been treated by the political establishment as well as consequences of the policies introduced specifically by the Democratic Party. The War on Poverty legislation launched in the mid-1960s is criticized.

Elder asserts that there is a lack of respectful disagreement in the American black community, and contends that conservative black thinkers like Thomas Sowell, Walter Williams, and Shelby Steele are unfairly ignored or marginalized.

The film title references Uncle Tom, the title character of Harriet Beecher Stowe's 1852 novel Uncle Tom's Cabin, which today is used as a derogatory term for black people, as demonstrated in the documentary by how black conservatives experience being called terms like "race traitor," "house negro," sellout, "boot licker," "coon," "Uncle Ruckus," and "Uncle Tom" by political adversaries. Elder says in the film, "An Uncle Tom is someone who sold out and embraced the white man by rejecting the idea that you're a victim".

The film was directed by Justin Malone, and is presented in black and white.

== Release and reception ==
Uncle Tom was released on June 19, 2020, and earned $400,000 USD in download sales in its first week By August it had received relatively scant attention from critics.

Megan Basham, the film and TV editor for evangelical Christian magazine World, said that "no major outlet has even bothered reviewing Uncle Tom." Basham wrote that the film had "persuasive arguments and an appropriately long-term perspective that allows for only a few minutes on the presidency of Donald Trump" but that the film suffered from "an overreliance on pundits."

Dante James of Film Threat gave the film 7 out of 10 and wrote: "It's a little misleading in some areas, especially if you know the players involved in this doc, but there are a lot of interesting historical facts about the breakdown of the Black family and how the whole welfare system targeted the Black community." James warned against too much trust of conservatives, citing Malcolm X's words about both political parties being dangerous to black causes.

== See also ==
- Black conservatism in the United States
