= Larry Elder =

American talk radio host (born 1952)

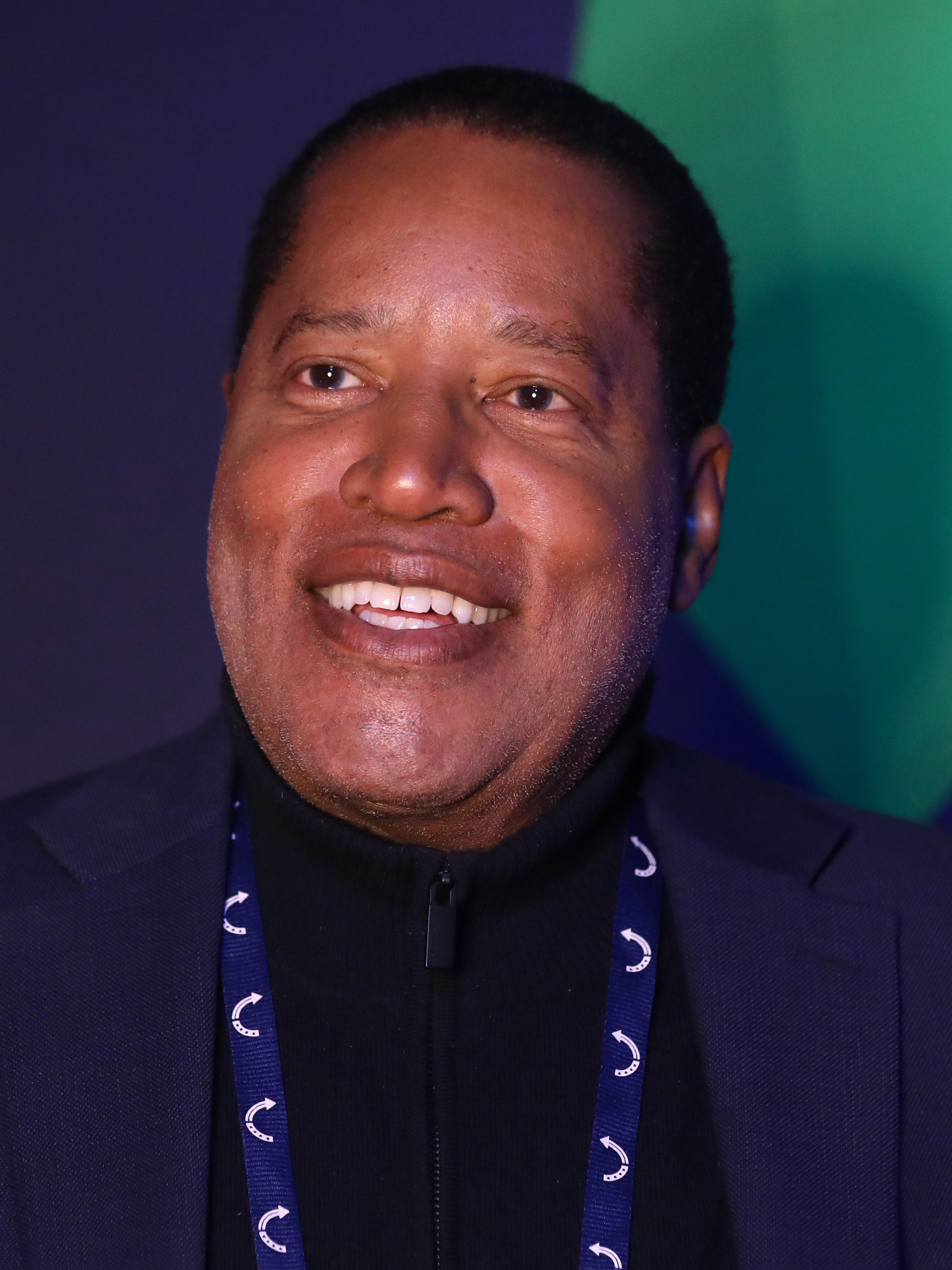
- Elder in 2023
- Born: Laurence Allen Elder; April 27, 1952 (age 74); Los Angeles, California, U.S.
- Education: Brown University (BA); University of Michigan (JD)
- Occupations: Television presenter; radio host; political commentator; attorney; writer
- Political party: Republican
- Spouse: Cynthia (div. 1994)
- Website: Official website

Laurence Allen Elder (born April 27, 1952) is an American conservative political commentator and talk radio host. He hosts The Larry Elder Show, based in California. The show began as a local program on Los Angeles radio station KABC in 1994 and ran until 2008, followed by a second run on KABC from 2010 to 2014. The show was nationally syndicated, first through ABC Radio Networks from 2002 to 2007 and then Salem Media Group from 2015 to 2022. He maintains ties to The Epoch Times, a newspaper published by the new religious movement Falun Gong. While Elder is primarily known as a conservative, he also self-identifies as a "small l libertarian", summarizing his political ideology as "I believe that a government that governs less governs best."

Elder, a former attorney, has written nonfiction books and a nationally syndicated column through Creators Syndicate. He is the author of As Goes California: My Mission to Rescue the Golden State and Save the Nation. In 2021, Elder launched his first run for public office as a Republican candidate in the recall election of California's Democratic governor Gavin Newsom. The recall was defeated by a wide margin, although Elder placed first among the replacement candidates. On April 20, 2023, Elder announced his candidacy for the Republican nomination in the 2024 presidential election, but dropped out on October 26.

== Early life and education ==
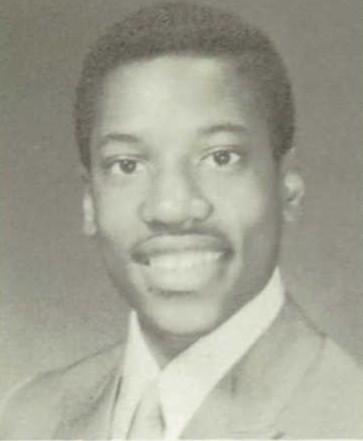
Elder as a high school senior in 1970

Laurence Allen Elder was born in Los Angeles and grew up in the city's Pico-Union and South Central areas, the middle child of three brothers. His father Randolph (1915–2011), who was born in Athens, Georgia, was a sergeant in the United States Marine Corps during World War II and moved to California from Georgia after the war during the Second Great Migration. After working as a janitor at Nabisco, Randolph Elder opened a cafe in Pico-Union c. 1962.

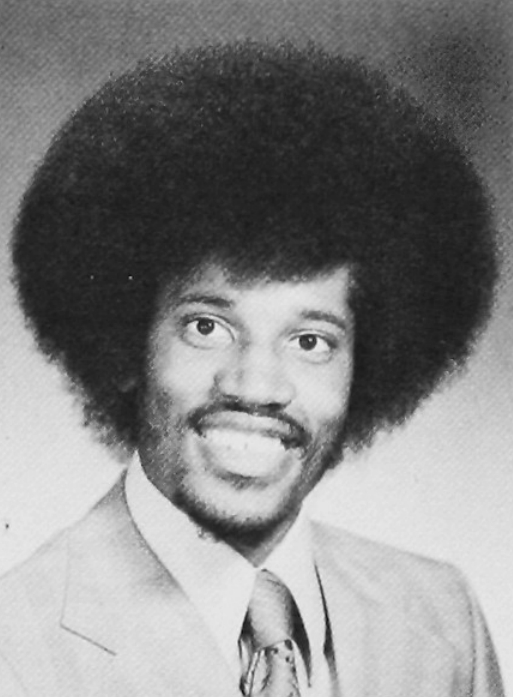
Elder in the Brown University yearbook, 1974

After his father's death in 2011, Elder recalled: "Gruff and blunt, my dad often intimidated my two brothers and me. But we never doubted his love or his commitment to his family." In 2013, Elder and his brother Kirk accepted a Congressional Gold Medal from U.S. Representative Dana Rohrabacher on their father's behalf. Larry Elder's mother Viola (née Conley, 1924–2006) was originally from Toney, Alabama. She was a clerical worker for the United States Department of War during World War II. His father was a Republican, and his mother a Democrat. An honors student who also took advanced courses at Fairfax High School, Elder graduated from Crenshaw High School in 1970 and earned his Bachelor of Arts degree in political science in 1974 from Brown University. He then earned a Juris Doctor from the University of Michigan Law School in 1977.

Elder's younger brother Dennis died of diabetes complications in 1997. His older brother, Kirk, died on September 13, 2019.

== Career ==
After graduation from law school, Elder joined the Cleveland-based law firm Squire, Sanders & Dempsey. In 1980, he founded Laurence A. Elder and Associates, a legal executive search firm. Elder stepped down from operating Elder and Associates c. 1987 but continued to own the firm until 1995. Elder's license to practice law in Ohio has been administratively suspended since December 2005, according to The Supreme Court of Ohio Attorney Directory website, which notes not keeping up registration requirements.

=== Media career ===
==== Television, film and video ====
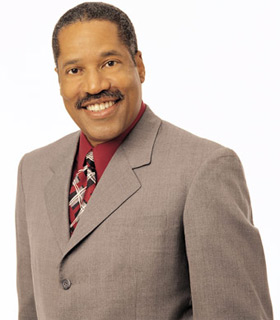
Elder in the 2000s

Elder began co-hosting Fabric, a topic-oriented television show produced by Dennis Goulden that aired on Cleveland's PBS member station WVIZ in 1988. In 1997, he hosted the PBS program National Desk along with fellow conservatives Fred Barnes and Laura Ingraham. Elder hosted the segments Redefining Racism: Fresh Voices From Black America and Title IX and Women in Sports: What's Wrong With This Picture, which criticized Title IX.

In 2000, Elder won a Los Angeles Area Emmy Award for his KCAL-TV News special Making Waves – LAUSD. Between 2000 and 2001, Elder hosted the court series Moral Court, distributed by Warner Brothers Television. In 2004, he hosted The Larry Elder Show, a syndicated talk show distributed by Warner Bros. In 2005, he created a self-financed film called Michael & Me, in which he offers a rebuttal to filmmaker Michael Moore's Bowling for Columbine.

In 2007, Elder was one of the rotating talk hosts auditioning for the slot vacated by the now-canceled Imus in the Morning on MSNBC. However, the job went to Joe Scarborough instead. As of 2024, Elder stars in the animated sitcom The New Norm as Charlie, Norm's like-minded best friend and boss. Elder is a columnist with Creators Syndicate. His newspaper and online column are carried by Investor's Business Daily, World Net Daily, Townhall.com, Jewish World Review and FrontPage Magazine. He hosts a video series published by The Epoch Times.

==== Radio ====
Elder hosted a weekday evening talk show on Los Angeles talk radio station KABC from 1994 until December 2008. He then launched a daily live podcast as well as a webcast in December 2009. Elder returned to KABC in September 2010. In December 2014, Elder was fired from KABC after one of his afternoon broadcasts. He was honored with a star on the Hollywood Walk of Fame in 2015. In June 2015, Elder joined the lineup of CRN Digital Talk Radio Networks. In August 2015, The Larry Elder Show began national syndication through the Salem Radio Network, including Los Angeles station KRLA.

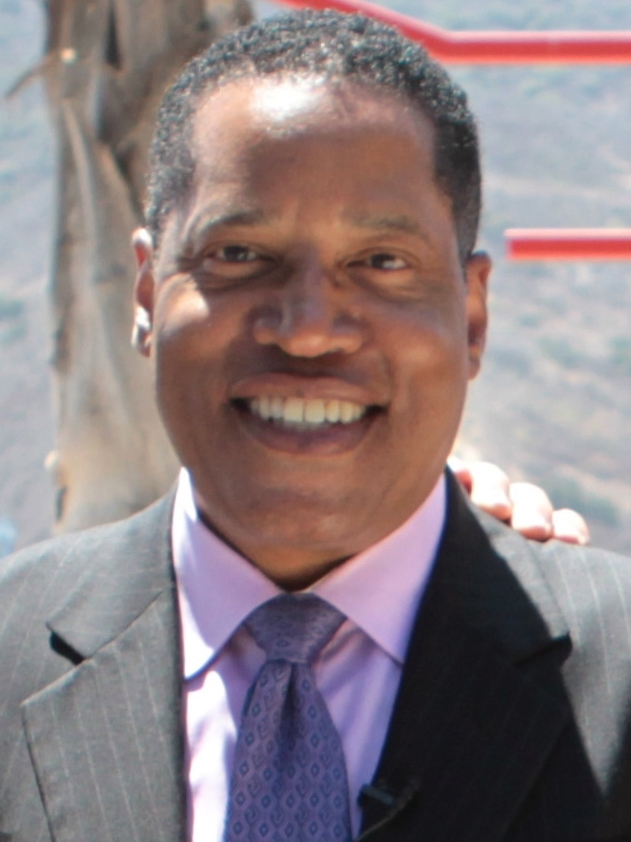
Elder in 2013

In a 2020 interview on NPR, Jean Guerrero, said that Elder had told her that he had invited Stephen Miller on his radio show as a guest a total of 69 times, having been impressed with Miller after he had first called in to the show as a high school student. Miller, who cites Elder as an influence, later became a Trump administration official and the architect of Trump's immigration policies. Elder left his Salem Radio afternoon slot as of April 4, 2022, after a six-year run. His regular fill-in host, Carl Jackson, who had substituted for Elder's during the latter's run for the California Governor seat, has again been named as the temporary fill-in host until a permanent replacement is named. Elder returned to the Salem Radio Network in August 2024, replacing Brandon Tatum, with the show distributed via the Salem Podcast Network and Salem News Channel.

==== Writing ====
In the late 1980s, Elder wrote op-eds for local newspapers in Cleveland. In 1998, Elder began writing a nationally syndicated column through Creators Syndicate. Elder wrote a weekly column for the Los Angeles Daily News until April 2012. Elder authored several books, including Stupid Black Men and What's Race Got to Do with It?

== Political activisms ==
Elder being interviewed by Democracy Broadcasting in 2016

Roll Call reported that Elder contemplated a possible run for the United States Senate against California Senator Barbara Boxer in 2010.

=== 2021 California gubernatorial recall election ===
In July 2021, Elder announced his candidacy to replace Governor Gavin Newsom in the 2021 California gubernatorial recall election. He said that he was encouraged to run by fellow conservative talk-radio figure Dennis Prager, a mentor to Elder. California Secretary of State Shirley Weber initially omitted Elder's name from the list of candidates to be on the ballot, saying that he failed to submit complete tax return information that was required according to Senate Bill 27, which was enacted in 2019; the law mandated tax return disclosure for both presidential and gubernatorial candidates in order to appear on a "primary" ballot (the presidential requirement was later struck down by the courts). Elder sued, saying that his paperwork was properly submitted and that Weber was required to fix the alleged errors. On July 21, 2021, Judge Laurie Earl of the Sacramento County Superior Court ordered Elder's reinstatement to the recall ballot, holding that Weber improperly disqualified Elder, who had "substantially complied" with disclosure requirements, and that the recall election's tax return disclosure requirements imposed by Secretary of State Weber were invalid, since the special recall election was not a "direct primary election". Weber's office did not appeal the ruling.

After his entry, Elder had been regarded as the front-runner on the election's replacement question. He refused to participate in debates with other Republican recall candidates, such as former San Diego Mayor Kevin Faulconer, state Assemblyman Kevin Kiley, and business owner John Cox, and had refused to share a stage with certain other candidates at Republican Party events. Former California Governor Pete Wilson was one of Elder's campaign advisors. If elected governor, Elder pledged to replace one of California's two Democratic senators, Dianne Feinstein, with a Republican.

In September 2021, while the recall election was underway, Elder claimed without evidence that there would be "shenanigans" in the voting process. Four days before election day, and before election results were known, a website paid for by Elder's campaign already referred to the election having "twisted results", baselessly stating that analyses "detected fraud in California resulting in Governor Gavin Newsom being reinstated as governor." On the night of the election, after Newsom defeated the recall effort, Elder told his supporters to be "gracious in defeat", stating that "we may have lost the battle, but we are going to win the war", proceeding to repeatedly criticize Newsom. In January 2022, Elder announced that he would not run against Newsom in the state's gubernatorial election later that year, and would instead focus on a new political action committee called "Elder for America" in order to help Republicans win back the House and Senate.

=== 2024 presidential election ===
Larry Elder
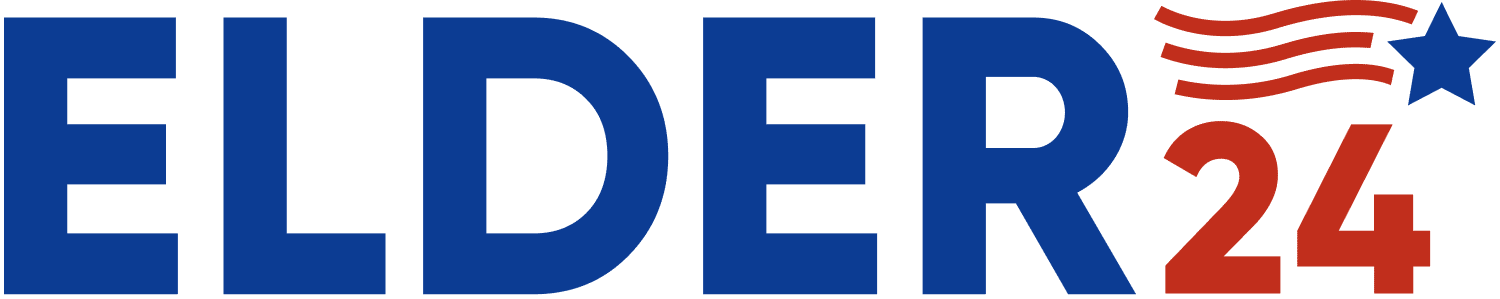
- Campaign: 2024 Republican primaries; 2024 U.S. presidential election
- Candidate: Larry Elder
- Affiliation: Republican Party
- Status: Announced: April 20, 2023; Suspended: October 26, 2023
- Headquarters: Costa Mesa, California
- Slogan: We've Got A Country To Save

Website
- www.elderforpresident.com

Over a year after the recall, Elder began floating the idea of running for president. On April 20, 2023, Elder officially announced his candidacy for president of the United States in the 2024 election. During a television appearance announcing his decision, Elder said "My father was a World War II vet, He served on the island of Guam. He was a Marine. My older brother, late older brother, Kirk, was in the Navy during the Vietnam era. My little brother Dennis actually served in Vietnam in the Army. I'm the only one who didn't serve, and I don't feel good about that. I feel I have a moral, religious and a patriotic duty to give back to a country that's been so good to my family and me. And that is why I am doing this." According to Elder, "America is in decline, but this decline is not inevitable. We can enter a new American Golden Age, but we must choose a leader who can bring us there. That's why I'm running for President."

While Elder announced his candidacy on Fox News, he appeared to break the news to the Washington Examiner one week earlier, on April 14, 2023. Since announcing his candidacy, Elder has appeared on various cable news shows, podcasts, and other media platforms to make his case for the presidency, including The Breakfast Club and Valuetainment's PBD Podcast. Elder claims "America is in decline, but this decline is not inevitable". He has made addressing crime a campaign priority, criticizing district attorneys with connections to billionaire George Soros for failing to "protect people and property". Elder is known for highlighting crime rates in cities like Chicago, Illinois. As a member of the Commission on the Social Status of Black Men and Boys, he is also critical of the Biden administration for "portraying black males as victims" and "ignoring the root causes of their struggles," accusing Democrats of "turning their backs on the very people they claim to support."

In July 2023, Elder criticized the Republican National Committee's (RNC) primary debate qualification rules, requiring each candidate to secure 40,000 individual donors and then hand over their donor information to the RNC. In an op-ed column published in The Hill, he called the requirements "artificial and arbitrary," refusing to "serve as a piggy bank for a political party." Elder has proposed a "Blind Spot" initiative, promising to sign an executive order that would prevent family members of presidents, vice presidents, and members of Congress from profiting off of those positions, both while their family members are in office and five years after the fact. He also supports making illegal immigration a felony at the state level, urging U.S. states to punish "illegal aliens" themselves. On August 22, Elder disclosed his financials, in which he reported to have made $1-$5 million from The Epoch Times and between $100,001 and $1 million from the anti-inflammatory supplement Relief Factor. Elder's disclosure violates guidance from the Office of Government Ethics which requires candidates to provide their exact income, not in ranges as he did.

Despite believing to qualify for the first presidential debate in Wisconsin, the RNC officially announced their list of candidates for the debate and Elder was left out. Elder then responded calling the process corrupt, and announced he would take further action in the form of legal prosecution to ensure he was on the debate stage. After being left out of the first Republican primary debate in late August, Elder criticized the RNC for excluding select polls from Rasmussen Reports, due to alleged connections to Donald Trump's presidential campaign. Rasmussen denied any connection to Trump, prompting Elder to state that “the rules of the game were rigged” to bar him from the debate stage.

Elder subsequently filed a complaint with the Federal Election Commission, accusing the RNC and Fox News of conspiring to leave him out of the debate by failing to apply the debate qualification standards equally. Elder blamed Biden and Vice President Kamala Harris for the U.S.-Mexico border crisis, with more than two million illegal migrants crossing the border for the second consecutive fiscal year in 2023. He also stated that Biden was "stuck" with Harris as his running mate in 2024, criticizing the president for aligning himself with Gavin Newsom and his "unaffordable dystopia" in California. On October 26, 2023, Elder ended his campaign for president, endorsing Donald Trump.

== Political views ==
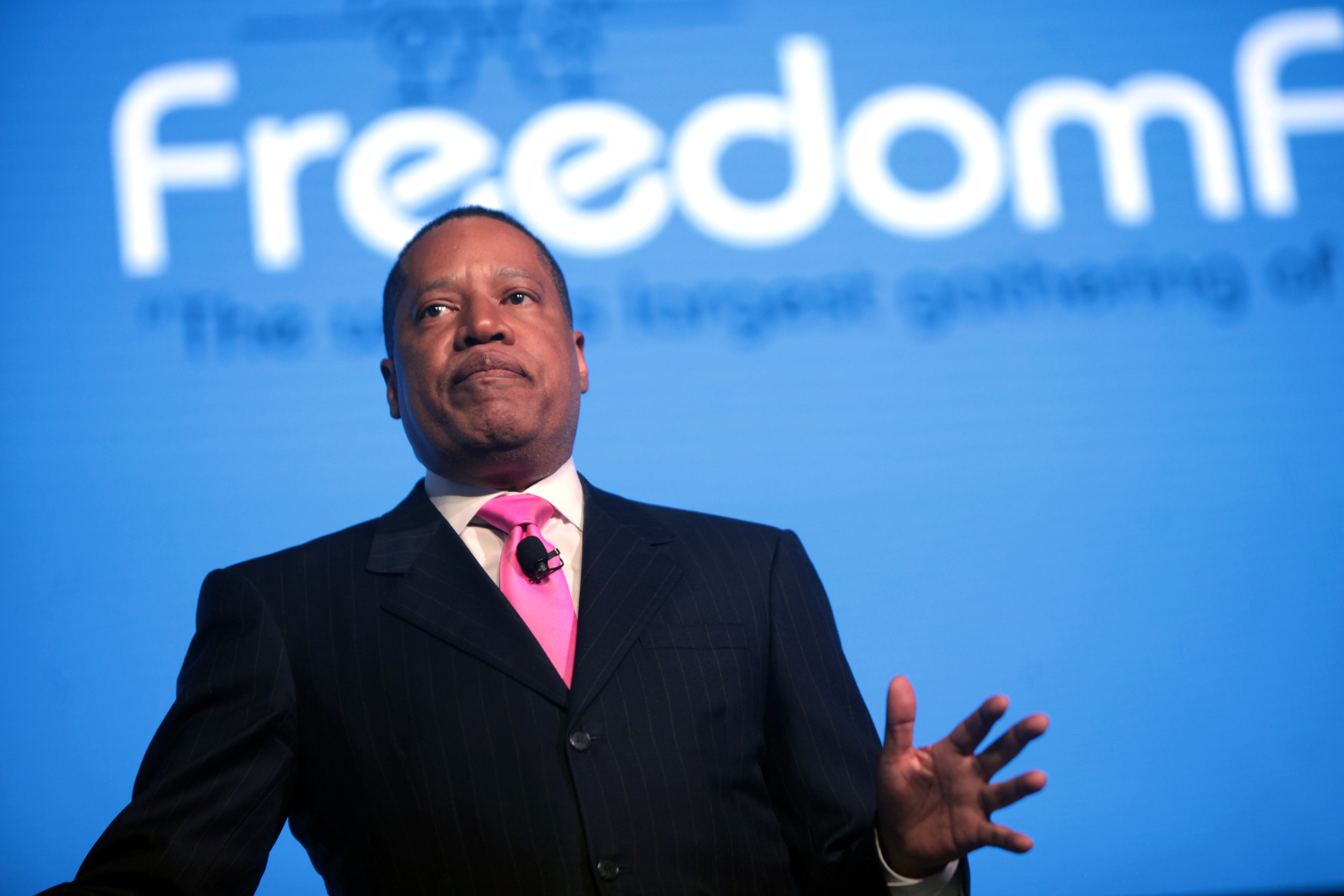
Elder at the libertarian FreedomFest in 2016

Elder holds conservative stances, as well as right-wing views. Elder is a registered Republican; in 2021, he stated that he had voted for the Republican candidate in every presidential election since 1980 after voting for Democrat Jimmy Carter in 1976. Elder labels himself a "small-l libertarian" as opposed to a member of the Libertarian Party. However, he has chaired a debate for the 2016 Libertarian Party presidential primaries. He has summed up his political philosophy as “I believe that a government that governs less governs best.”

He is an ardent supporter of president Donald Trump, frequently praising him on Twitter. He was an early supporter of Trump's 2016 candidacy for president. In 2019, speaking to an audience about the election of Trump, Elder said, "It was a miracle. He is almost God-sent." After Joe Biden won the 2020 presidential election and Donald Trump made claims of fraud while refusing to concede, Elder said that he did not believe that Biden won the 2020 election fairly. Elder has argued that it is unfair to blame Trump for the January 6 U.S. Capitol attack by a pro-Trump mob. Elder opposed the first tariffs imposed by Trump and Trump's decision to draw down U.S. troops from Afghanistan. The Sacramento Bee pointed out his ties to The Epoch Times, a newspaper considered to be far-right, which is published by the Falun Gong movement.

=== Economic issues ===
In his 2000 book, The Ten Things You Can't Say In America, Elder laid out a 10-point plan to "save America". He called for abolishing the Internal Revenue Service, creating a national sales tax, reducing government by 80%, ending welfare and entitlements, abolishing the minimum wage, and eliminating corporate taxes. Elder opposes minimum wage laws arguing, "The ideal minimum wage is $0.00." He opposes universal basic income. Elder opposes California's unpaid family leave law. In his 2020 film Uncle Tom: An Oral History of the American Black Conservative, Elder criticizes the War on Poverty.

On a CNN Crossfire segment in 2013 along with New Jersey Governor Chris Christie, Elder criticized Christie for accepting the "architecture of the welfare state" and claimed that "government took almost 50 percent of the American people's money" through mandates, a claim he supported by referring to an analysis by the conservative advocacy group Americans for Tax Reform. PolitiFact rated his claim "Mostly False".

Elder has been critical of public-sector labor unions, especially the California Teachers Association. He contends that some 15,000 California teachers are "incompetent", and previously proposed that thousands of teachers in the state be fired. He later said that he favored more charter schools and private schools instead. Elder proposes to cap government spending at 10 percent of U.S. gross domestic product, while preventing the sitting president and all members of Congress from running for re-election in the next cycle if the spending cap is exceeded.

=== Social issues ===
In August 2021, Elder came under criticism for his long history of disparaging statements about women. Elder has contended that "Women know less than men about political issues, economics, and current events" when citing a 2017 Cambridge study by Toni Alexander Ihme and Markus Tausendpfund; mocked women who took part in the 2017 Women's March as "obese"; mocked premenstrual syndrome by saying PMS stands for "Punish My Spouse"; endorsed pregnancy discrimination by employers; reposted an article on his website that likened single mothers on welfare to stray cats; and claimed that statistics about domestic violence against women are exaggerated to promote feminism. Elder has asserted that Democrats achieve more success among women voters because they have "emotionally driven, but often unsound policies."

Elder has often denied that a gender wage gap exists. Elder contends that employers should be allowed to discriminate in employment against women who plan to have children, and in his 2002 book he wrote that women who choose to have children are not "dedicated" to their jobs and suggested that they lacked a "commitment" to work. Elder reiterated these views in 2021, while he ran for governor, after fellow Republican candidate Kevin Faulconer criticized Elder's views. Elder opposes abortion, calling it "murder". He has argued that Roe v. Wade should be overturned, calling the decision "one of the worst decisions that the Supreme Court ever handed down." He believes that abortion laws should be decided at the state level.

Elder has made anti-LGBTQ remarks on Twitter and has repeatedly used male pronouns when referring to transgender women, such as model Ines Rau and fellow gubernatorial candidate Caitlyn Jenner. In 2021, Elder accused California of having a "soft-on-crime ethos"; he opposes a California law that banned police from using certain chokeholds. Elder opposes 2014 California Proposition 47, which reclassified as misdemeanors many lower-level drug and property crimes that had formerly been felonies, and said that if elected governor he would press for the proposition to be repealed.

=== Science, environment, and the COVID-19 pandemic ===
During his media career, Elder published and gave airtime to misinformation and fringe views on scientific topics, such as secondhand tobacco smoke, climate change, and COVID-19 treatments. In a 2000 book, Elder suggested that the health hazards of secondhand tobacco smoke had been exaggerated, rejecting the scientific consensus that secondhand smoke is a serious threat that caused 2.5 million deaths in the half-century before 2014.

Elder's website once described climate change as a "myth"; in a 2008 interview, he called climate change a "crock", disparaged Republicans such as John McCain and George W. Bush, who acknowledged climate change, and said that global warming is not a "big peril" to planet Earth. In 2021, Elder acknowledged that the climate is warming, but rejected the scientific consensus that human activity is the primary contributor, calling concern over climate change "alarmism."

In 2021, Elder pledged to remove current statewide public health mandates for state government workers in California, such as COVID-19 vaccine requirements, face mask requirements, or regular COVID-19 testing. Elder encouraged "people in high-risk categories, people who are older" to be vaccinated but said that "young people" do not need to be vaccinated. In 2021, Elder did not challenge a call-in listener to his radio show who espoused COVID-19 misinformation suggesting that COVID-19 vaccines were dangerous and part of a Bill Gates-orchestrated plot, and a page on Elder's website promoted the call-in listener's comments by saying, "You'll want to hear this physician's take on the vaccines." Elder has proposed suspending or waiving the requirements of the California Environmental Quality Act, contending that doing so would speed up housing construction.

=== Race relations ===
Elder does not believe in systemic racism, calling it a lie. He is a critic of the Black Lives Matter movement, blaming it for rising crime. As part of his criticism of welfare, he stated that it is more harmful to Black families than slavery ever was. He has proposed school choice as a solution for poor performance of Black children in school.

In 2025, Larry Elder posted a cartoon that depicted Zohran Mamdani, a Muslim candidate in the 2025 New York City mayoral election, as a plane crashing into the World Trade Center. The post drew backlash from some commentators.

=== Crime ===
On Elder's 2024 presidential campaign website, crime was the first issue listed. Elder is a vocal supporter of law enforcement. Elder blames the Democratic Party and organizations like the National Association for the Advancement of Colored People (NAACP) for ignoring crime and the "epidemic of fatherlessness" in Black neighborhoods. He says "Black-on-Black urban crime in Democratic-run cities" is a top concern for the Black community, while also saying Democrats such as Biden "manipulate Blacks into seeing themselves as victims."

== Personal life ==
Elder was married for two years to a physician, who was also a long-term friend of his. They divorced in 1994 because she wanted to have children, and he did not. Elder later dated Patricia Stewart from 1996 to 2012, and they have remained friends since their separation. Elder then dated Alexandra Datig, a longtime former radio producer for him, and was engaged to her from 2013 until 2015.

=== Allegations of abuse and sexual harassment ===
In 2011 episodes of his radio program, Elder disclosed that he had twice been accused of sexual harassment and denied both allegations. In one case, Elder defended himself by implying that the woman was too unattractive for him to sexually harass, saying, "If you had seen her, you would know that the picture would be a complete defense. I'm just saying."

In 2021, Elder's former fiancée Alexandra Datig accused him of abuse. Datig said that Elder had demanded she show devotion by having "Larry's Girl" tattooed on herself and, during an argument, brandished a gun threateningly at her while "high" on cannabis. After Datig's allegations became public, The Sacramento Bee editorial board and fellow candidates Kevin Faulconer and Caitlyn Jenner called for Elder to withdraw from the race. Elder denied Datig's accusations and called them "salacious allegations".

== Bibliography ==
- Elder, Larry (2001). The Ten Things You Can't Say in America. New York: St. Martin's Griffin. ISBN 0312284659. OCLC 47859180 – via Google Books.
- Elder, Larry (2003). Showdown: Confronting Bias, Lies, and the Special Interests that Divide America. New York: St. Martin's Griffin. ISBN 0312320175. OCLC 53143426.
- Elder, Larry (2009). What's Race Got to Do with It?: Why It's Time to Stop the Stupidest Argument in America (Revised ed.). New York: St. Martin's Griffin. ISBN 978-0312541477. OCLC 243544859.
  - Originally published as Stupid Black Men: How to Play the Race Card and Lose. New York: St. Martin's Press. 2008. ISBN 978-0312367336. OCLC 263707542.
- Elder, Larry (2017). Double Standards: The Selective Outrage of the Left. Hermosa Beach, California: Creators Publishing. ISBN 978-1945630651. OCLC 1038079231.
- Elder, Larry (2018). A Lot Like Me: A Father and Son's Journey to Reconciliation: A Memoir. Washington: Regnery Publishing. ISBN 978-1621577973. OCLC 1019746878.
  - Originally published as Dear Father, Dear Son: Two Lives...Eight Hours. Washington: WND Books. 2012. ISBN 978-1936488452. OCLC 800025121.

== Filmography ==
- Redefining Racism: Fresh Voices from Black America
- Title IX And Women In Sports: What's Wrong With This Picture? Whidbey Island Films
- For Goodness Sake II (1996) – Elder hosts the "Diversity Through Character" segment.
- Michael & Me (2005)
- Uncle Tom (2020)
- Electric Vehicles: The Good, The Bad, and the Ugly (2025)

== See also ==
- African-American candidates for President of the United States
- Black conservatism in the United States
- History of African Americans in Los Angeles
- Libertarian conservatism
- List of African-American Republicans
- List of African-American United States presidential and vice presidential candidates
