= KSLK (California) =

Radio station in Visalia, California (1997–2013)

- Visalia, California; United States
- Broadcast area: Visalia-Tulare
- Frequency: 96.1 MHz

Ownership
- Owner: New Visalia Broadcasting, Inc.

History
- First air date: 1997
- Last air date: October 25, 2013

Technical information
- Facility ID: 48657
- Class: A
- ERP: 4,800 watts
- HAAT: 110 meters (360 ft)
- Transmitter coordinates: 36°21′59″N 119°10′45″W

KSLK (96.1 FM) was a commercial radio station licensed to Visalia, California, United States, and served the Visalia-Tulare area. The station was last owned by New Visalia Broadcasting, Inc.

KSLK's license was cancelled by the FCC on October 25, 2013. In its last years on the air, KSLK broadcast a Spanish-language sports radio format, using programming from ESPN Deportes Radio.
