= Jewish World Review =

Jewish magazine published in the United States

- Editor-in-Chief: Binyamin L. Jolkovsky
- Founded: 1997
- Country: United States
- Based in: Brooklyn, New York
- Language: English
- Website: jewishworldreview.com
- OCLC: 44198497

Jewish World Review is a politically conservative, online magazine updated Monday through Friday (except for legal holidays and holy days), which seeks to appeal to "people of faith and those interested in learning more about contemporary Judaism from Jews who take their religion seriously.”

It carries informational articles related to Judaism, dozens of syndicated columns written mostly by politically conservative writers, both Jewish and Gentile, advice columns on a number of issues, and cartoons.

The founder and editor-in-chief, Binyamin L. Jolkovsky, is a rabbinical school graduate and a former correspondent for Yated Ne'eman, an Israeli daily. In 2023, Jolkovsky claimed the site was now “among the oldest surviving non-corporate sites on the web."

Although the magazine is written to appeal to Orthodox Jews, Jolkovsky said he seeks a broader readership because "there are a lot of Christians who live Jewish values better than some Jews." Regarding his magazine's political orientation, he said: "It is hard to understand a religious person who votes Democrat... Maimonides, the great Jewish philosopher, said there are ten levels of charity, tzedakah. The highest level is making a person self-sufficient, which sounds like what the GOP wants to do."

== Political positions ==
The magazine's first edition said it would not be "preachy or partisan". It is described by the Center for Media and Democracy as "politically conservative and religiously-minded".
