= Black French people =

Racial and multi-ethnic group

Afro-Français (French)

Total population
- Approximately 3–5 million (2009 estimate); NB: it is illegal for the French state to collect data on ethnicity and race.

Regions with significant populations
- Paris, Lyon, Marseille, Grenoble, Dijon, Bordeaux, Nantes, Martinique, Guadeloupe, French Guiana, Saint Martin, Réunion, Mayotte, New Caledonia

Languages
- French, French Creoles, New Caledonian languages, African languages

Religion
- Majority Christianity, minority Islam, Irreligion and Traditional African religions

Related ethnic groups
- Sub-Saharan Africans · Melanesians

Afro-French, also known as French Black people or Black French people (Afro-Français) are French people who have ancestry from any of the Black racial groups of Africa. It also includes people of mixed ancestry. France has the largest Black population in Europe. The Paris metro area also has the largest Black population in Europe (Ethnic and racial censuses have been banned in France since 1978.)

The absence of a legal definition of what it means to be "black" in France, the extent of anti-miscegenation laws over several centuries, the great diversity of black populations (African, Caribbean, etc.) and the lack of legal recognition of ethnicity in French population censuses make this social entity extremely difficult to define, unlike in countries such as the United States and Haiti.

== Definition issues ==
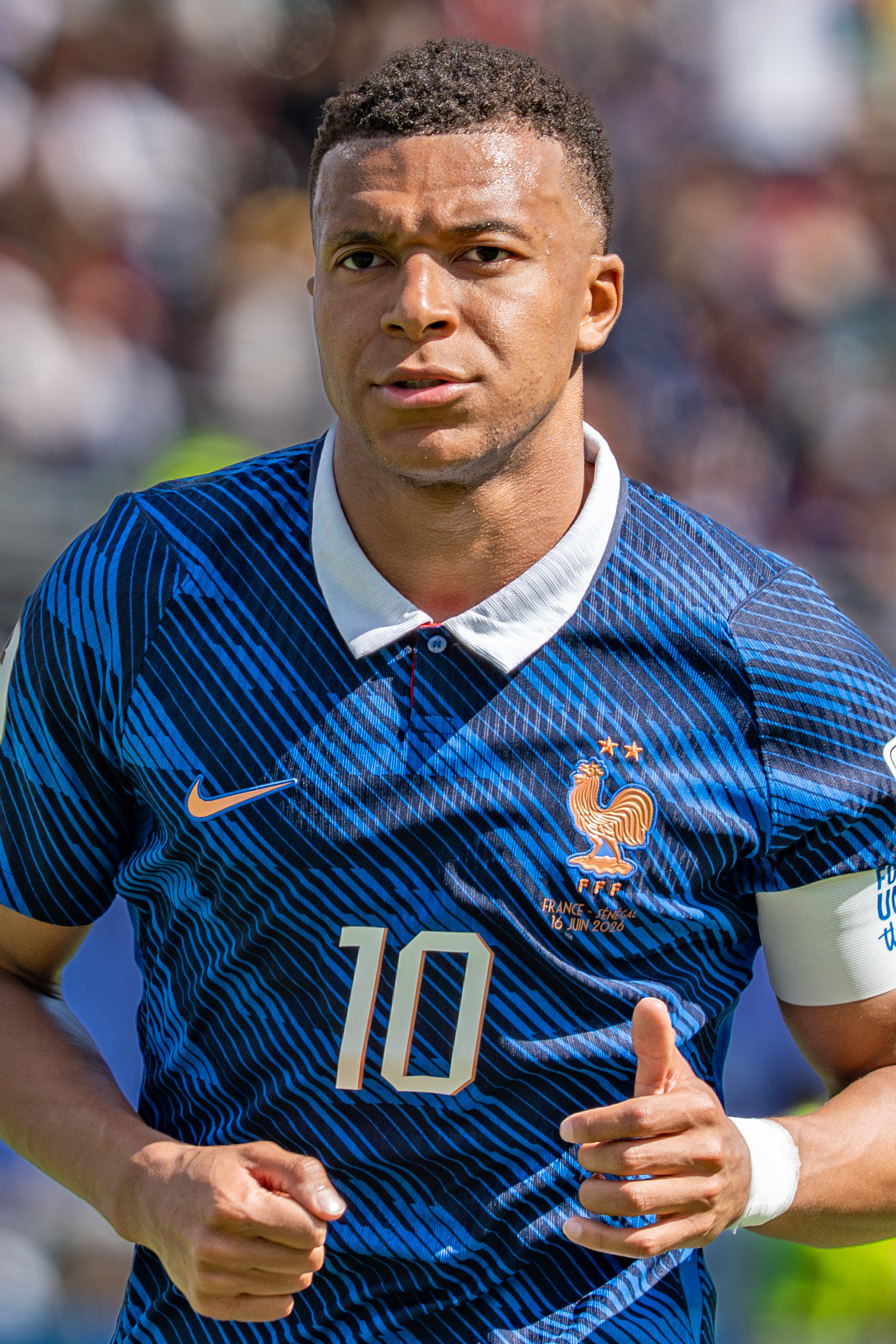
Kylian Mbappé is of partial Black African descent. His father is originally from Cameroon, but his mother is Kabyle, originally from Algeria.

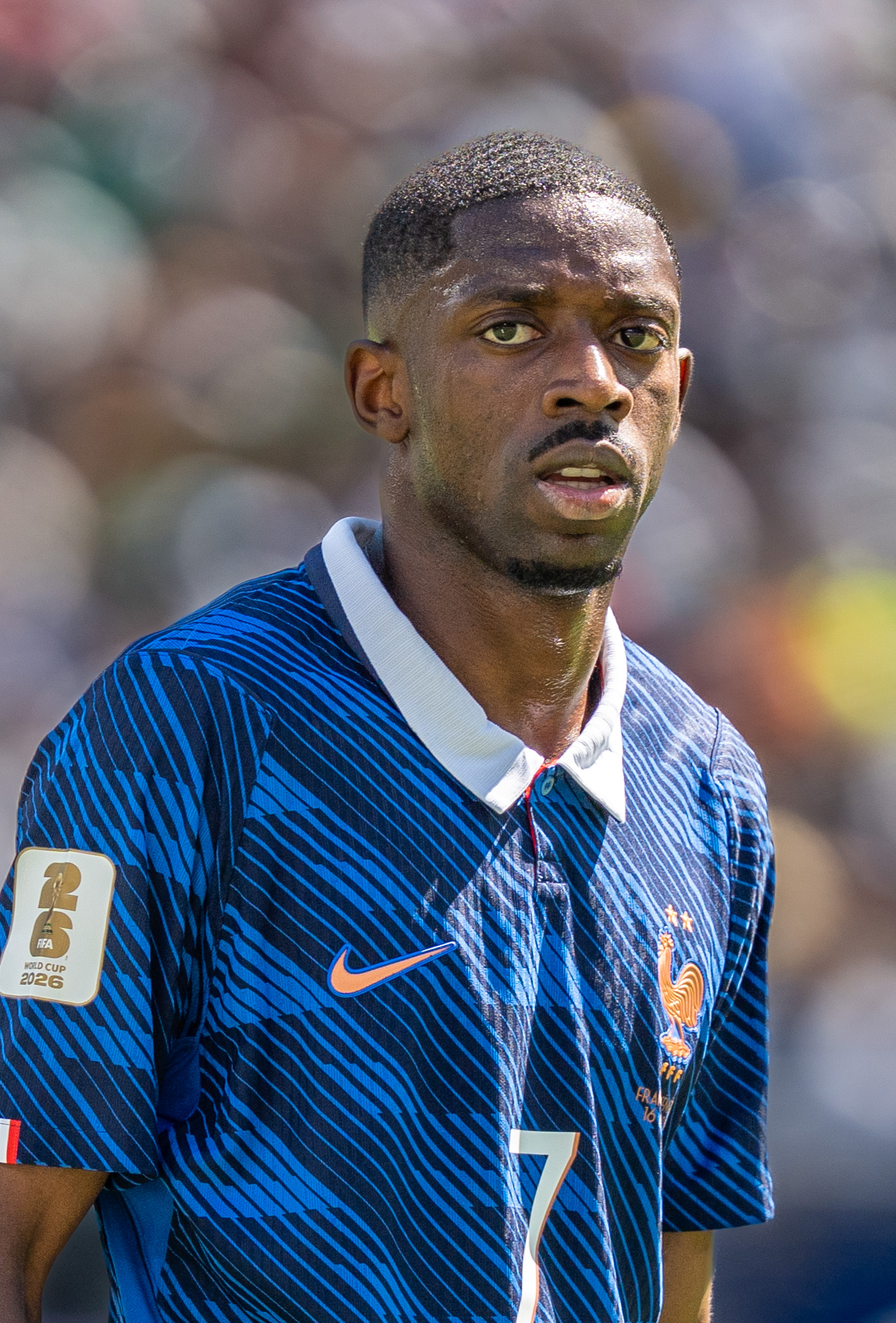
Ousmane Dembélé is of full Black African descent. His father is originally from Mali, and his mother is originally from Mauritania and Senegal.

In France, there is no formal definition of ethnicity, particularly in terms of its relationship to French identity or to multiracial people. However, this type of identity may be reflected in organizations such as the Conseil représentatif des associations noires, or in other ways.

Much of the academic literature dedicated to black people comes from the USA, where "black identity" is relatively homogeneous: these are essentially the descendants of slaves brought over in the 18th century to work on the plantations of the American Southeast. However, the definition of "black" in the United States, based on the "One-drop rule", has no objective basis in reality, and only partially correlates with skin color and historical trajectory.

If the black Americans can be roughly compared to French black people from the overseas departments (notably the West Indies, even if equal rights there go back much further than in the US), the bulk of dark-skinned people living in mainland France have nothing to do with this pattern or with the history of slavery: as historian and former minister Pap Ndiaye points out, in France "the black group is infinitely diverse socially and culturally, and lumping all blacks into the same categorical bag is a problematic operation."

This great complexity in talking about "Blacks" served as the basis for the screenplay of the film Tout simplement noir (by Jean-Pascal Zadi and John Wax, 2020), which illustrates the distance between personalities such as Claudia Tagbo (a naturalized French actress from Ivory Coast), Omar Sy, (a French actor born in Trappes to Senegalese and Malian parents), Lucien Jean-Baptiste (a Caribbean actor from Martinique) and JoeyStarr (born in Paris to Martinique parents of Afro-Caribbean, Britain and Chinese descent), Éric Judor (born to a father of mixed race from Guadeloupe and an Austrian mother) and Vikash Dhorasoo (of south Indian origin).

Other non-African black-skinned ethnic groups include some of the Melanesians of the south-western Pacific Ocean (including the French territory of New Caledonia), of whom Christian Karembeu is a famous representative.

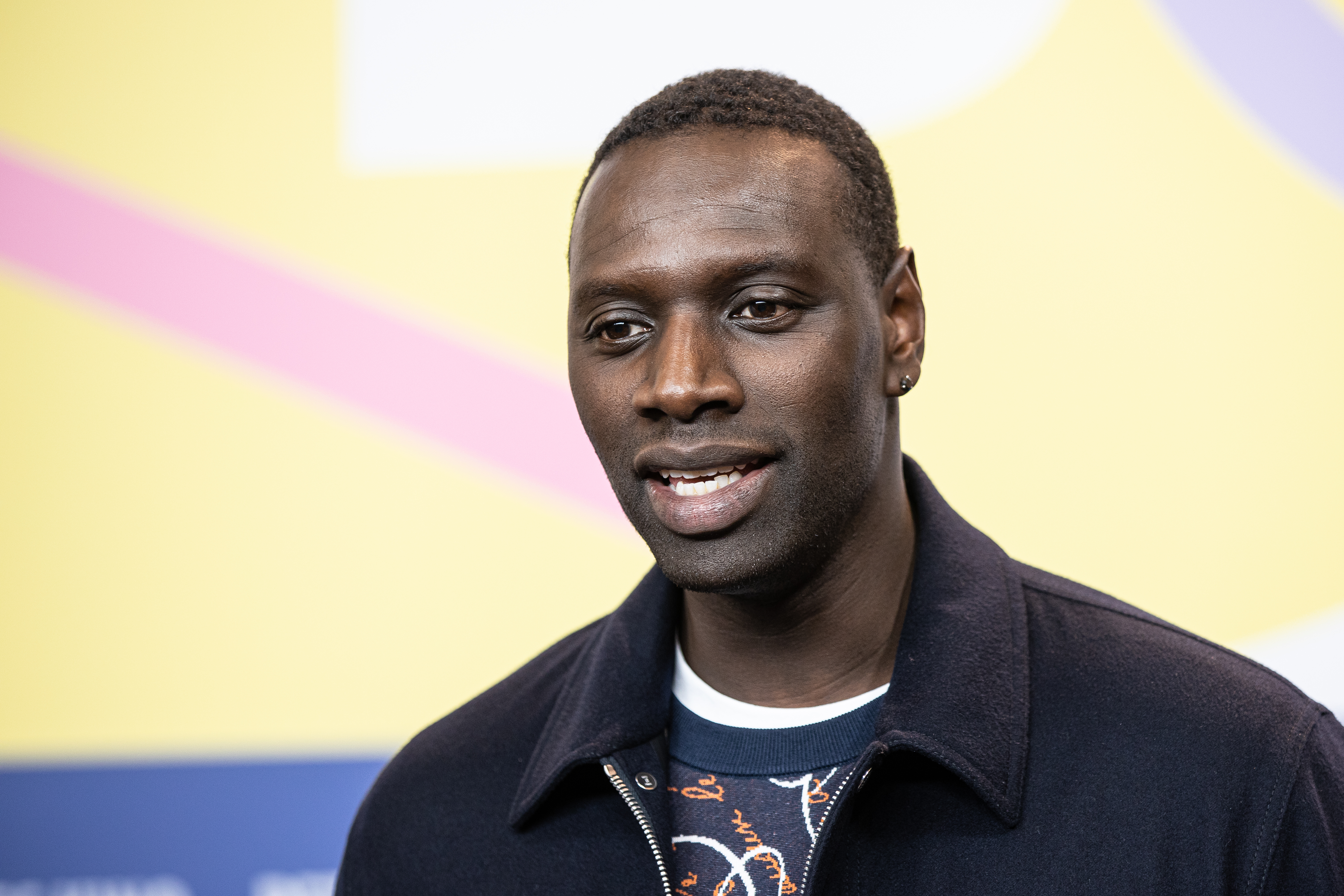
Omar Sy a comedian with African origins (Senegal and Mauritania).

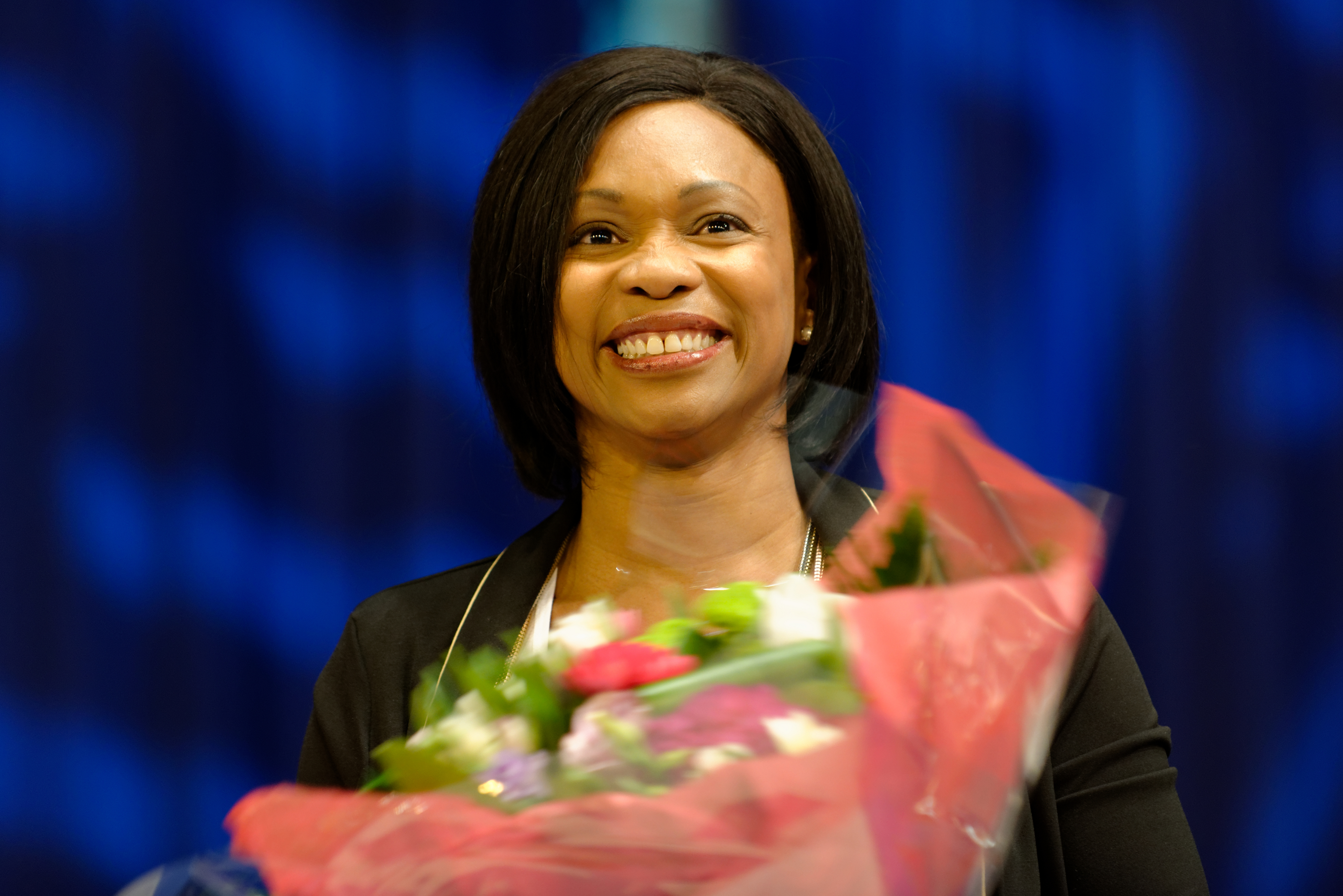
Laura Flessel, a Caribbean sportswoman (Guadeloupe)

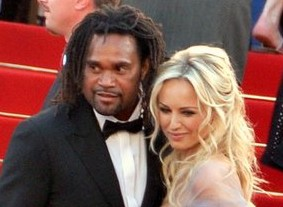
Christian Karembeu, a Melanesian footballer (from New Caledonia).

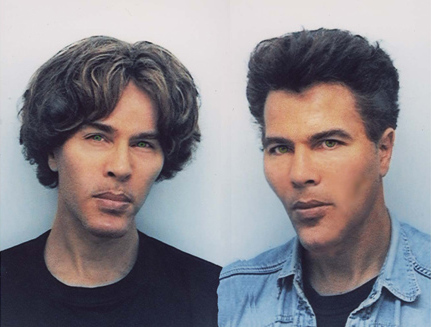
Igor and Grichka Bogdanoff twin brothers, considered as Russian in France but who would be considered as people of color if following the US ethnicity guidelines.

== Population statistics ==
Although it is illegal for the government of France to collect data on ethnicity and race in the census (a law with its origins in the 1789 revolution and reaffirmed in the constitution of 1958), various population estimates exist. An article in The New York Times in 2008 stated that estimates vary between 3 million and 5 million.

Some organizations, such as the Representative Council of France's Black Associations (French: Conseil représentatif des associations noires de France, CRAN), have argued in favor of the introduction of data collection on minority groups but this has been resisted by other organizations and ruling politicians, often on the grounds that collecting such statistics goes against France's secular principles and harkens back to Vichy-era identity documents. During the 2007 presidential election, however, Nicolas Sarkozy was polled on the issue and stated that he favoured the collection of data on ethnicity. Part of a parliamentary bill which would have permitted the collection of data for the purpose of measuring discrimination was rejected by the Conseil Constitutionnel in November 2007.

== Politic ==
In August 2026, a study by CRAN highlighted a critical under-representation of Black elected officials in major French cities; according to the study, there is "a deliberate and systemic blocking of municipal executive bodies," representing "a double betrayal of the republican motto".

== Notable people ==
=== In French politics ===
==== Afro-French members of the French Parliament or government from overseas France ====
There have been dozens of Afro-Caribbean and Afro-French MPs representing overseas electoral districts at the French National Assembly or at the French Senate, and several government members.

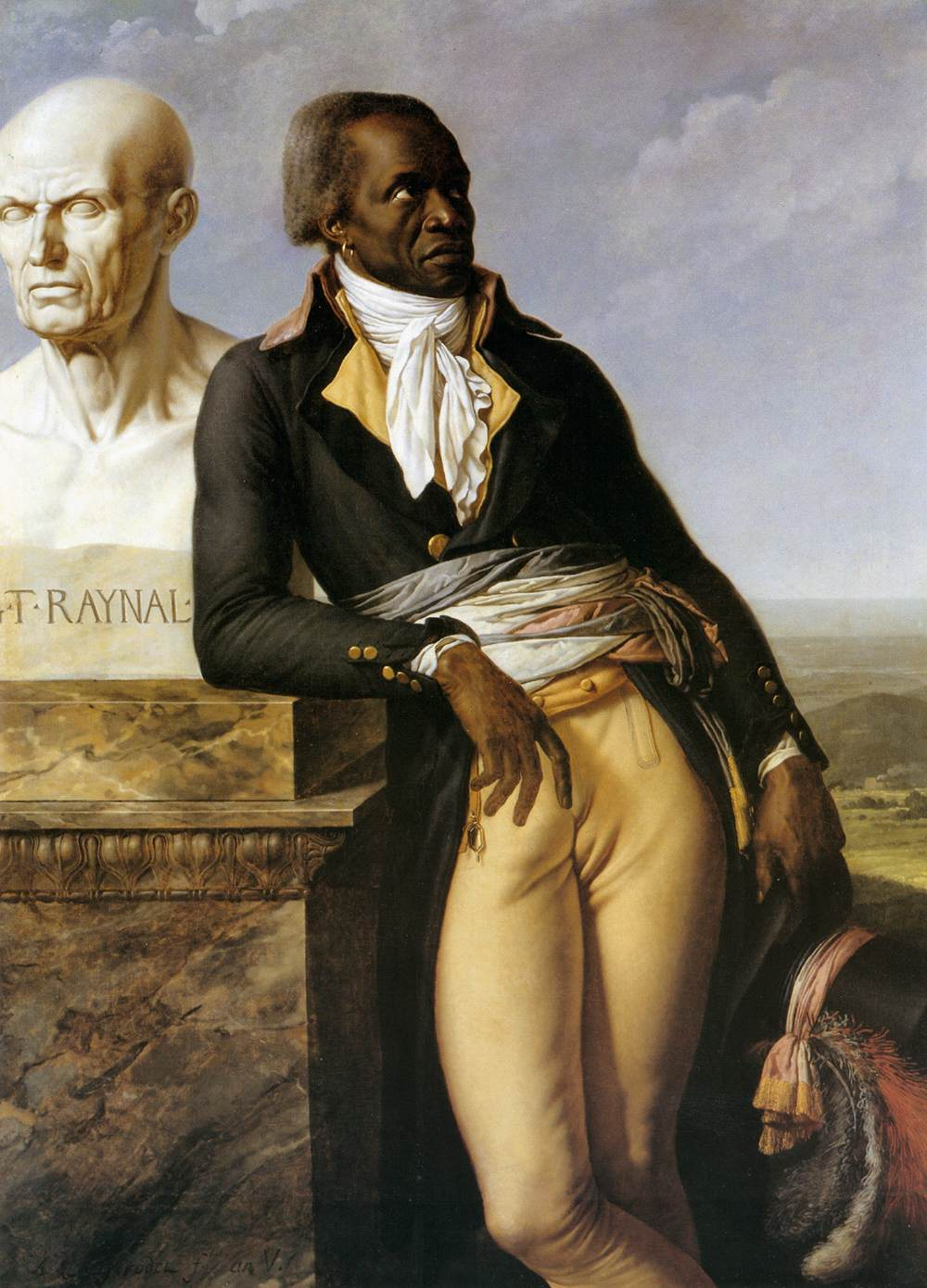
Jean-Baptiste Belley, first black politician

- Jean-Baptiste Belley, first black politician to take a seat at the National Convention when elected on 24 September 1793, as one of three members (deputés) elected to the French Parliament by the northern region of Saint-Domingue.
- Hégésippe Légitimus, second black deputy elected to the French National Assembly from 1898–1902 and 1906-1914.
- Gratien Candace, politician from Guadeloupe who served in the French Chamber of Deputies from 1912 to 1942 and served as vice-president of the French Chamber of Deputies from 1938 to 1940.
- Blaise Diagne, political leader and mayor of Dakar. He was the first person of West African origin elected to the French Chamber of Deputies, and the first to hold a position in the French government.
- Ngalandou Diouf, elected in 1909 to represent the commune of Rufisque at the advisory General Assembly (Conseil Général) of Saint-Louis, then capital of colonial Senegal.
- Achille René-Boisneuf, Guadeloupe politician and one of the first black deputies in the French National Assembly. He is incorrectly given the name Émile instead of Achille in Jean Joly's Dictionnaire des parlementaires français de 1889 à 1940 1946.
- Maurice Satineau, politician from Guadeloupe who served in the Senate from 1948-1958 and the French Chamber of Deputies from 1936 to 1942 (the Chamber was not summoned between 1940 and 1942)
- Roger Bambuck, Minister of Youth and Sports from 1988 to 1991.
- Aimé Césaire, mayor of Fort-de-France and deputy from Martinique for the PCF/Martinican Progressive Party.
- Félix Éboué, French Guianan-born colonial administrator and Free French leader.
- Laura Flessel-Colovic, she became the Sport Minister in 2017.
- Serge Letchimy, deputy for Martinique Socialist Party, Letchimy is also of partial Tamil descent.

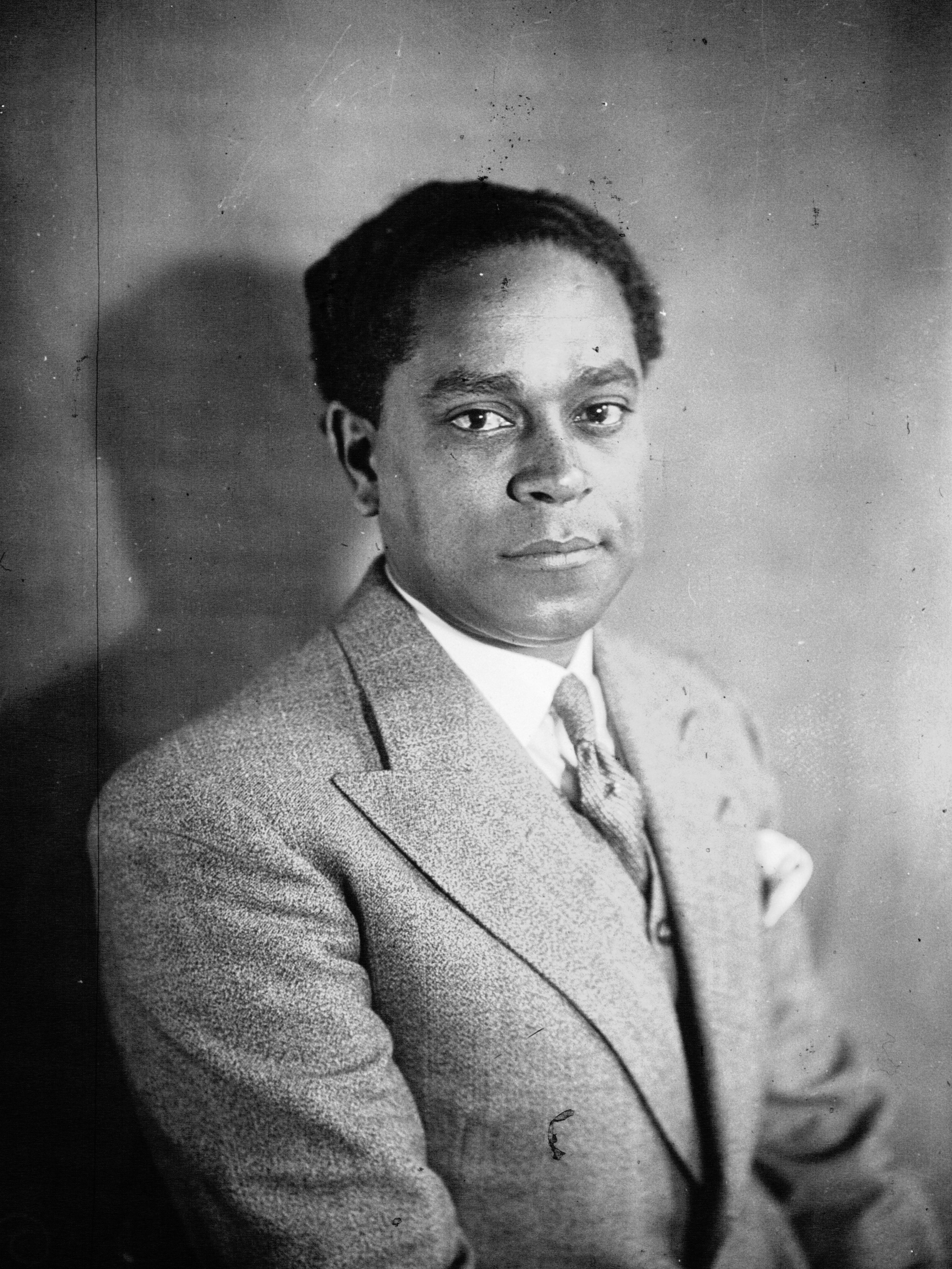
Gaston Monnerville was the vice-president (president of the Senate) during the two presidencies of Général de Gaulle (1958-1968).

- Gaston Monnerville, politician and lawyer, he was the president of the Senate from 1958 to 1968.
- Maurice Ponga, New Caledonian politician who served as Member of the European Parliament (MEP) for the Overseas constituency from 2009 to 2019.
- Christiane Taubira, deputy from French Guiana, was the first black candidate to a French presidential election, in 2002. In 2012, she became the Justice Minister until 2016.
- Manuéla Kéclard-Mondésir, deputy from Martinique

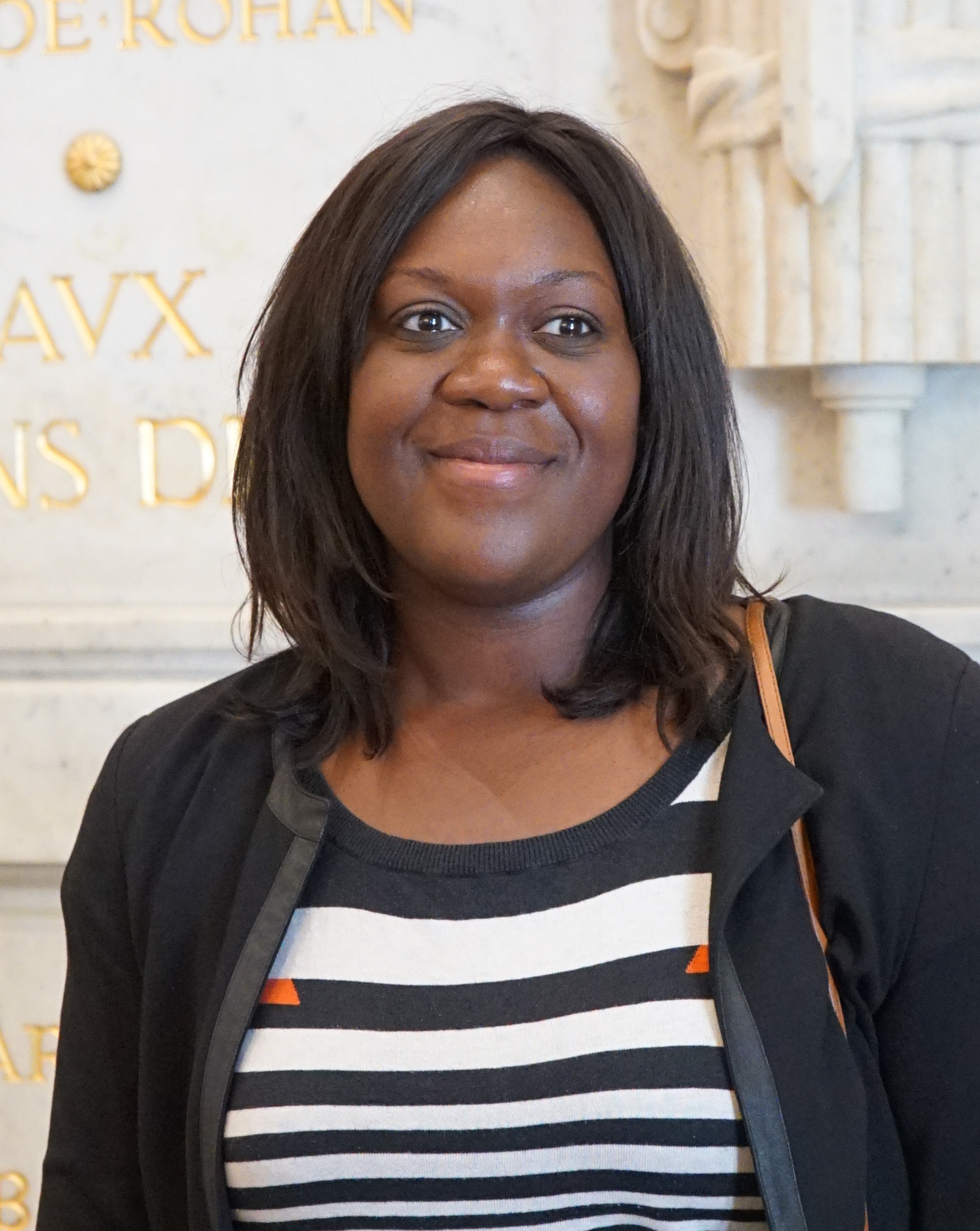
Laetitia Avia was an MP from Paris and faced allegations of anti-Asian racism and homophobia during her tenure

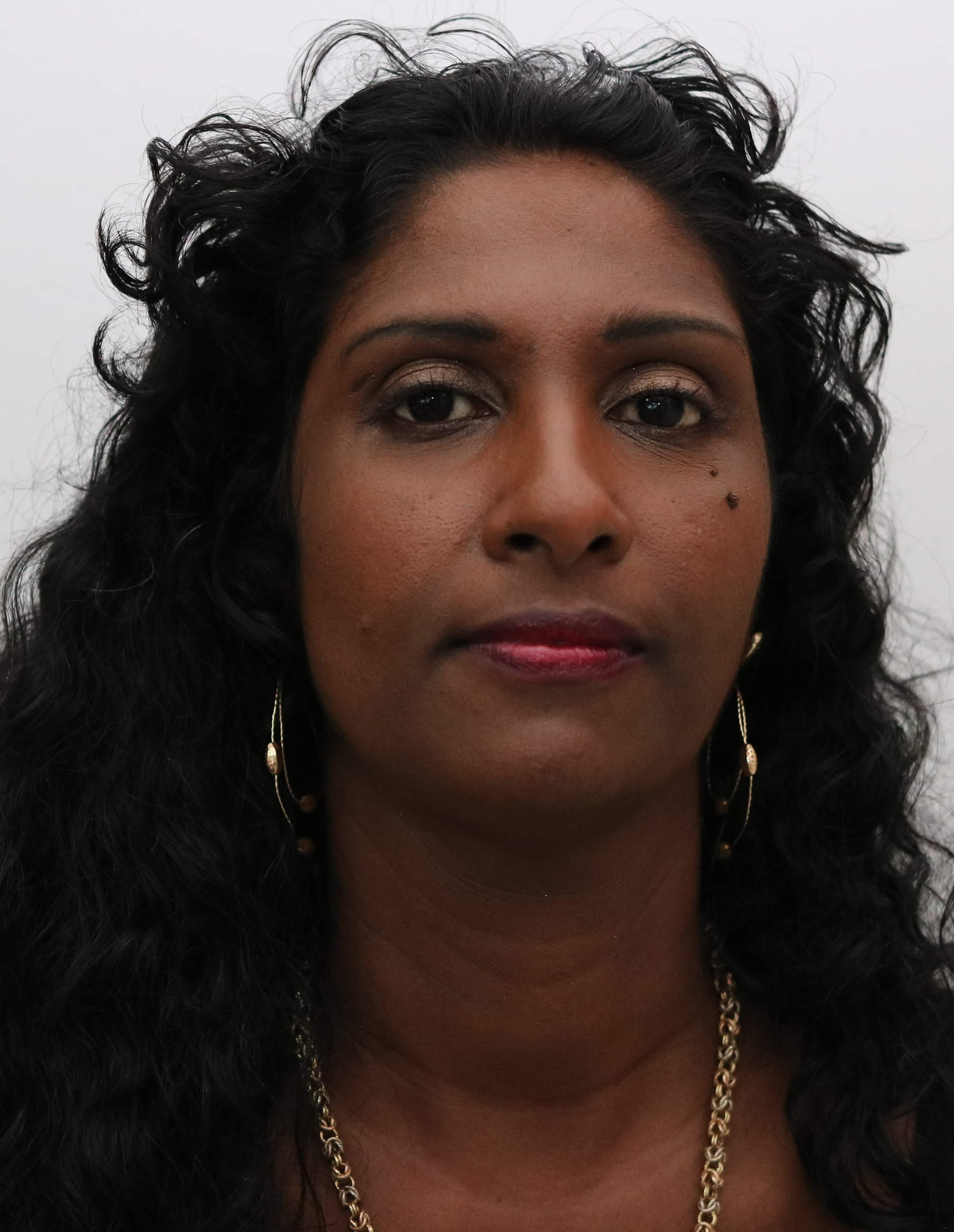
Maxette Grisoni-Pirbakas is the spokeswoman for the National Rally in the European Parliament.

==== Afro-French people elected in metropolitan France ====
- Louis Guizot (1740-1794), magistrate, became the very first Black Mayor of a town in metropolitan France in 1790, before ending up guillotined during the Reign of Terror.
- Severiano de Heredia, president of the municipal council of Paris (1879–1880/ sort of mayor of Paris ), deputy for Paris (1881–1889), minister (1887)
- Blaise Diagne (1872-1934), first person of Sub-Saharan African origin elected to the French Chamber of Deputies, and the first to hold a position in the French government.
- Raphaël Élizé (1891–1945), first Black metropolitan mayor elected through universal suffrage (1929–40)
- Élie Bloncourt (1896–1978), second Black metropolitan deputy (1936–40, 1945–47), first Black metropolitan general councillor (1934–40, 1945–51)
- Ernest Chénière (1945–), former deputy for Oise (1993–97)
- Hélène Geoffroy, deputy for Rhône, mayor
- Maxette Grisoni-Pirbakas, elected an MEP in 2019.
- Gaston Monnerville (1897–1991), first Black metropolitan senator (1946–1974), president of the French Senate (1947–68), mayor, president of Lot's general council
- George Pau-Langevin, Paris deputy (2007–12), junior minister (2012–2014), Minister for Overseas (2014–)
- Arthur Richards (1890–1972), general councillor in Bordeaux (1951–1964), deputy for Gironde (1958–67)
- Rama Yade, former minister and secretary of State
- Harlem Désir, former minister for European Affairs and MEP, former First Secretary of the French Socialist Party
- Kofi Yamgnane, former minister, former MP, former mayor, former general councillor in Brittany.
- Hervé Berville, Rwandan genocide survivor, French economist and politician, Côtes-d'Armor MP for La République En Marche! since June 2017, party spokesperson.
- Seybah Dagoma, then 34-year-old lawyer of Chadian descent and founding member of a left-wing think tank, was elected in a Parisian constituency in 2012 and in office until 2017.
- Laetitia Avia, lawyer of Togolese descent, member of the National Assembly for the Paris's 6th constituency elected in 2017, defeated in 2022
- Danièle Obono, Gabonese descent MP for La France Insoumise representing the 17th Paris constituency since the legislative elections of 2017.
- Nadège Abomangoli, deputy from Seine-Saint-Denis
- Pap Ndiaye, historian of Franco-Senegalese descent, Minister of National Education and Youth from 20 May 2022 – 20 July 2023 in the Élisabeth Borne government.
- Rachel Keke, Ivorian-born French politician and former chambermaid, now member of the National Assembly since 2022, representing the 7th constituency of the Val-de-Marne department.
- Fanta Berete, politician of Renaissance who has been serving as a Member of Parliament for Paris's 12th constituency since 2022. She was the substitute of Olivia Grégoire who became a government minister.
- Carlos Martens Bilongo, French teacher and politician who has represented the 8th constituency of the Val-d'Oise department in the National Assembly since 2022 for La France Insoumise (FI), he was elected under the New Ecological and Social People's Union (NUPES) alliance.

==== Political activists ====
- Frantz Fanon, Marxist, existentialist and anti-colonial author and activist. Renounced his French citizenship.
- Louis-Georges Tin, president of the Representative Council of France's Black Associations and founder of the International Day Against Homophobia
- Rokhaya Diallo, French journalist, BET-France host, author, filmmaker, and activist for racial, gender and religious equality.
- Sibeth Ndiaye, French-Senegalese communications advisor. Government Spokeswoman for Édouard Philippe's government from April 2019 to July 2020.
- Stéphane Pocrain, co-founder of CRAN (Conseil Représentatif des Associations Noires de France) and ecologist militant.
- Fodé Sylla, co-founder of CRAN, second president of the French anti-racist organisation SOS Racisme between 1992 and 1999.

=== In sports ===
==== In basketball ====
- Tariq Abdul-Wahad
- Alexis Ajinça
- Andrew Albicy
- Joël Ayayi
- Valériane Ayayi
- Nicolas Batum
- Rodrigue Beaubois
- Juhann Begarin
- Isaïa Cordinier
- Boris Diaw
- Moustapha Fall
- Rudy Gobert
- Sandrine Gruda
- Mathias Lessort
- Timothé Luwawu-Cabarrot
- Ian Mahinmi
- Amath M'Baye
- Joakim Noah
- Endéné Miyem
- Frank Ntilikina
- Tony Parker
- Johan Petro
- Mickaël Piétrus
- Yves Pons
- Iliana Rupert
- Olivier Sarr
- Kevin Séraphin
- Diandra Tchatchouang
- Axel Toupane
- Ronny Turiaf
- Victor Wembanyama
- Gabby Williams
- Guerschon Yabusele
- Isabelle Yacoubou

==== In football ====
- Raoul Diagne (1910-2002), first black player to be selected for France national football team.
- Marius Trésor, one of the best central defenders of all time in Pele's top 125 greatest living footballers.
- Larbi Benbarek (1914-1992), nicknamed "the Black Pearl", largely remembered as the first successful black footballer in Europe.
- Armand Laurienté
- Arnaud Kalimuendo
- Arnaud Nordin
- Abdoulaye Diallo
- Adama Soumaoro
- Aldo Angoula
- Allan Nyom
- Alexis Beka Beka
- Alexis Claude-Maurice
- Alban Lafont
- Amir Richardson
- Amos Youga
- Antoine Baroan
- Anthony Modeste
- Armand Traoré
- Arthur Masuaku
- Aurélien Tchouaméni
- Christophe Mandanne
- Jimmy Briand
- Jordan Amavi
- Benoît Assou-Ekotto
- Boulaye Dia
- Boubacar Kamara
- Bouna Sarr
- Boubakary Soumaré
- Bradley Locko
- Bryan Mbeumo
- Castello Lukeba
- Cédric Kipré
- Chris Makiese
- Christian Karembeu, of New Caledonia
- Cyril Mandouki
- Damien Plessis
- Dan-Axel Zagadou
- Junior Dina Ebimbe
- Ervin Taha
- Nicolas Anelka
- Cédric Avinel
- Chris Mavinga
- Christopher Rocchia
- Colin Dagba
- Cyriaque Mayounga
- Damien Dussaut
- Serge Aurier
- Elye Wahi
- Eric Abidal
- Flavien Belson
- Florian Chabrolle
- Jean-Kévin Augustin
- Jean-Christophe Bahebeck
- Tiémoué Bakayoko
- Florent Sinama Pongolle
- Griedge Mbock Bathy
- Gaël Clichy
- Garland Gbelle
- Pascal Chimbonda
- Logan Costa
- Dayot Upamecano
- Djibril Cissé
- Kevin Mbabu
- Kingsley Coman
- Moussa Dembélé
- Ousmane Dembélé
- Abou Diaby
- Koffi Djidji
- Lassana Diarra
- Axel Disasi
- Marcel Desailly
- Alou Diarra
- Patrice Evra
- Harold Moukoudi
- Odsonne Édouard
- Bafétimbi Gomis
- William Gallas
- Sidney Govou
- Yoan Gouffran
- Jean-Daniel Akpa Akpro
- Johann Obiang
- Josuha Guilavogui
- Thierry Henry
- Romain Habran
- Jonathan Ikoné
- Julian Jeanvier
- N'Golo Kanté
- Geoffrey Kondogbia
- Presnel Kimpembe
- Alexandre Lacazette
- Steve Mandanda
- Eduardo Camavinga
- Yann M'Vila
- Blaise Matuidi
- Florent Malouda
- Eliaquim Mangala
- Anthony Martial
- Ethan Mbappé
- Kylian Mbappé
- Michaël Ciani
- Michael Olise
- Rio Mavuba
- Benjamin Mendy
- Ferland Mendy
- Paul-Georges Ntep
- Christopher Nkunku
- Moussa Diaby
- Nordi Mukiele
- Hervin Ongenda
- Nicolas Pépé
- Paul Pogba
- Ibrahima Konaté
- Loïc Rémy
- Bacary Sagna
- Mamadou Sakho
- Marcel Tisserand
- Moussa Sissoko
- Myziane Maolida
- Youssouf Sabaly
- Jonathan Biabiany
- Louis Saha
- Lilian Thuram
- Samuel Umtiti
- Patrick Vieira
- Peter Luccin
- William Vainqueur
- Raphaël Varane
- Sylvain Wiltord
- Kurt Zouma
- Yacine Brahimi
- Sandy Baltimore
- Corentin Tolisso
- Didier Domi
- Pierre-Emerick Aubameyang
- Mohamed Sissoko
- Thomas Lemar
- Tanguy Ndombele
- Steven N'Zonzi
- Layvin Kurzawa
- Mike Maignan
- Alassane Pléa
- Djibril Sidibé
- Wendie Renard
- Delphine Cascarino
- Grace Geyoro
- Kadidiatou Diani
- Griedge Mbock Bathy
- Aïssatou Tounkara
- Viviane Asseyi
- Emelyne Laurent
- Marie-Antoinette Katoto
- Malang Sarr
- Ouleymata Sarr
- Aminata Diallo
- Jeff Reine-Adélaïde
- Jérôme Roussillon
- Lesley Ugochukwu
- Lys Mousset
- Nicolas Isimat-Mirin
- Samuel Moutoussamy
- Simon Falette
- Steve Marlet
- Stéphane Dalmat
- Virgil Gomis
- Yan Valery
- Fabrice Pancrate
- Garissone Innocent
- Evan Ndicka
- William Saliba
- Ronaël Pierre-Gabriel
- Fabrice Abriel
- Francis Coquelin
- Franck Beria
- Olivier Dacourt
- Richard Sele
- Philippe Christanval
- Donovan Makoma
- Mathys Tel
- Malcolm Barcola
- Grejohn Kyei
- Bradley Barcola
- Mikaël Silvestre
- Wesley Saïd
- Jean-Charles Castelletto
- Ludovic Blas
- Valerien Ismael
- Yorgan Agblemagnon
- Alexander Djiku
- Hugo Ekitike
- Kenny Nagera
- Kenny Lala
- Koba Koindredi
- Jacques Zimako
- Jérôme Gnako
- Joffrey Torvic
- Lamine Diaby-Fadiga
- Loïck Landre
- Loïc Loval
- Mounir Obbadi
- Oumar Solet
- Sekou Yansané
- Simon Banza
- Wesley Fofana
- Giovanni Sio
- Granddi N'Goyi
- James Léa Siliki
- Jimmy Mainfroi
- Jonathan Bamba
- Malo Gusto
- Marley Aké
- Maxence Lacroix
- Nathaël Julan
- Olivier Ntcham
- Ouparine Djoco
- Randal Kolo Muani
- Romain Gall
- Samuel Camille
- Serhou Guirassy
- Sofiane Diop
- Tanguy Kouassi
- Tanguy Ndombele
- Willy Boly
- Willem Geubbels
- Yannick Bellechasse
- Yannick Bolasie
- Yanis Cimignani
- Yohann Thuram-Ulien
- Jean-Philippe Mateta
- Mohamed-Ali Cho
- Samuel Souprayen
- Sébastien Haller
- Souleyman Doumbia
- Evan Ndicka
- Gaël Angoula
- Romaric Yapi
- Serge Gakpé
- Steve Lawson
- Tanguy Coulibaly
- Thievy Bifouma
- Yannick Kamanan
- Nathan Ngoumou
- Janis Antiste
- Johan Audel
- Kévin N'Doram
- Kévin Fortuné
- Louis Nganioni
- Wilfried Dalmat
- Yannick Pandor
- Yves Desmarets
- Hiang'a Mbock
- Simon Banza
- Wesley Jobello
- Dylan Saint-Louis
- Jordan Pierre-Charles
- Amadou Soukouna
- Sebastian De Maio
- Pierre Kalulu
- Gédéon Kalulu
- Aldo Kalulu
- Loïc Badiashile
- Nicolas Senzemba
- Valentin Gendrey
- Chaker Alhadhur
- Isaac Lihadji
- Ismail Hassan
- Janis Antiste
- Jérémy Sorbon
- Jonathan Mexique
- Kévin Anin
- Lilian Brassier
- Loïs Diony
- Manu Koné
- Mickaël Nelson
- Sacha Boey
- Thomas Ephestion
- Warren Zaïre-Emery
- Wilfried Domoraud
- Rahavi Kifouéti
- Yannick Sagbo
- Bryan Teixeira
- Olivier Davidas
- Steven Moreira

==== In rugby ====
- Pierre-Henri Azagoh
- Demba Bamba
- Mathieu Bastareaud
- Serge Blanco
- Serge Betsen
- Jonathan Danty
- Ibrahim Diallo
- Thierry Dusautoir
- Gaël Fickou
- Constantin Henriquez
- Sekou Macalou
- Jimmy Marlu
- Noa Nakaitaci
- Émile Ntamack
- Francis Ntamack
- Romain Ntamack
- Yannick Nyanga
- Fulgence Ouedraogo
- Alivereti Raka
- Teddy Thomas
- Virimi Vakatawa
- Cameron Woki
- Georges-Henri Colombe
- Peato Mauvaka
- Yoram Moefana
- Romain Taofifénua
- Sébastien Taofifénua
- Sipili Falatea
- Selevasio Tolofua
- Patrick Tuifua

==== Other sports ====
- Christine Arron, track and field sprint athlete
- Roger Bambuck, track and field sprint athlete
- Surya Bonaly, Olympic figure skater
- Stéphen Boyer, volleyball player
- Laura Flessel-Colovic, fencer
- Vanessa James, Olympic figure skater
- Gaël Monfils, tennis player
- Daniel Narcisse, team handball player, IHF World Player of the Year 2012
- Francis Ngannou, mixed martial artist
- Earvin N'Gapeth, volleyball player
- Barthélémy Chinenyeze, volleyball player
- Éric N'Gapeth, father of Earvin, volleyball player
- Yannick Noah, last French French Open tennis winner to this day (1983), current French Davis Cup coach
- Marie-José Pérec, multiple Olympic gold medal sprinter
- Jackson Richardson, team handball player, IHF World Player of the Year 1995
- Teddy Riner, judoka
- Jo-Wilfried Tsonga, tennis player
- Arthur Fils, tennis player
- Giovanni Mpetshi Perricard , tennis player
- Marc Raquil, French track and field athlete
- Ladji Doucouré, former French track and field athlete now INSEP coach

=== In scientific fields ===
Alice Sollier (1861-1942), first Black French woman to qualify as a medical doctor

Rose Dieng-Kuntz (1956–2008), computer scientist specialising in artificial intelligence

=== In entertainment and media ===
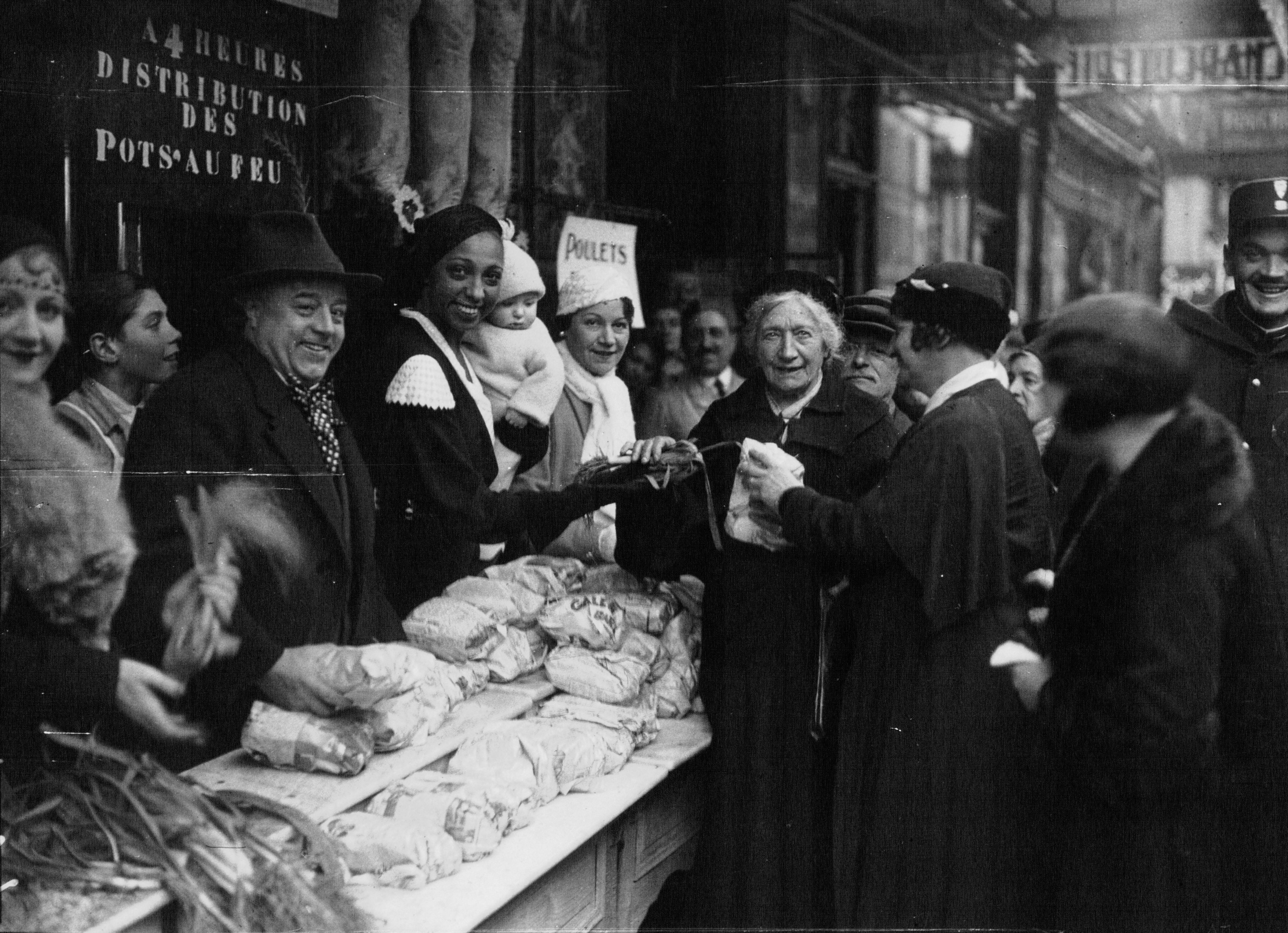
American-born Josephine Baker in 1932, distributing pot-au-feu

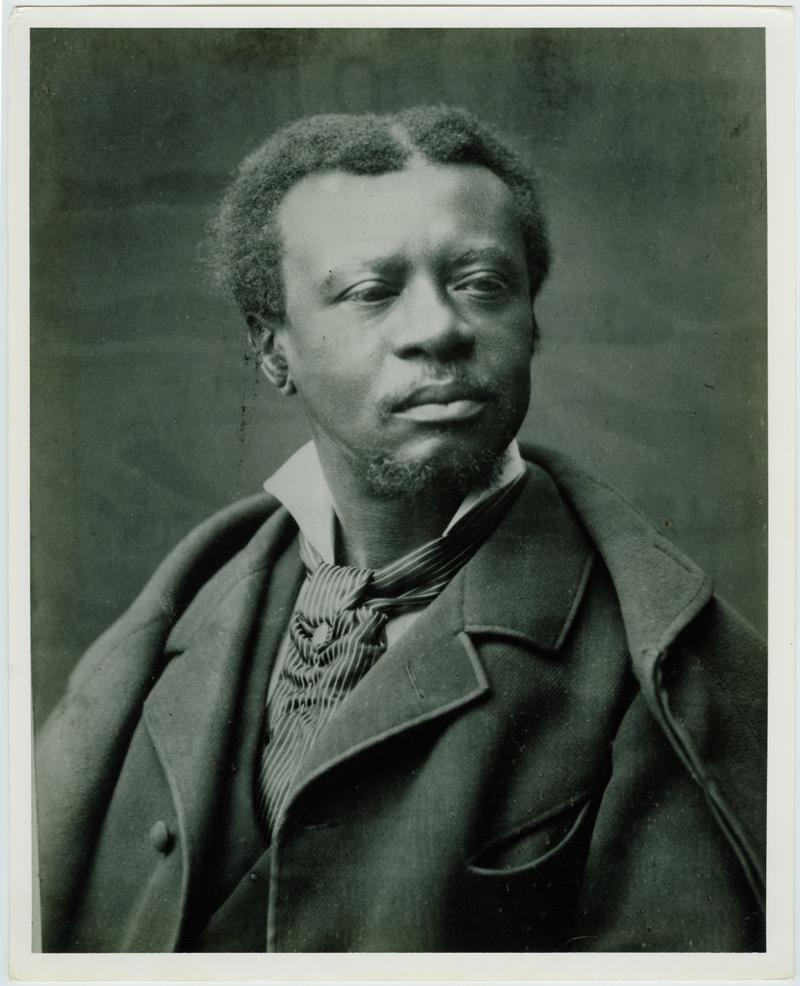
Edmond Dédé, French-American Classical musician and composer

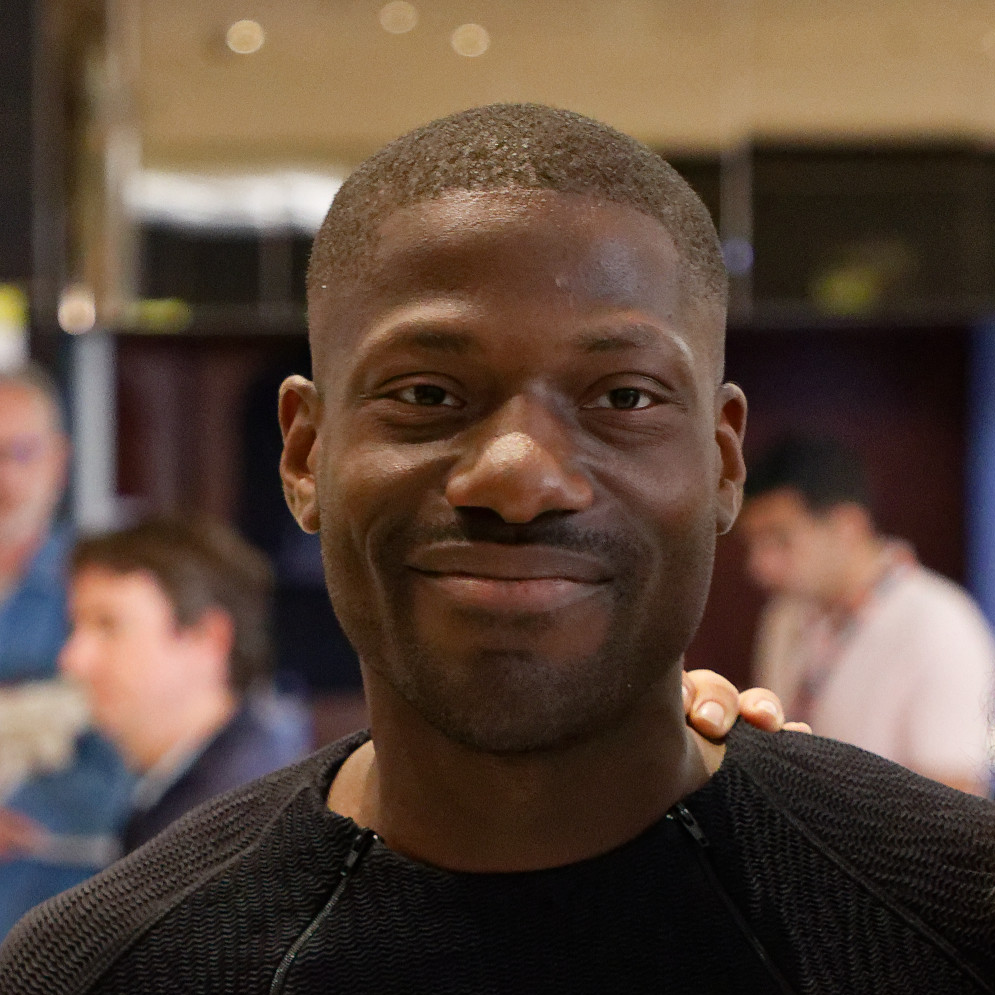
Erwan Kepoa Falé, French actor of Ivorian descent

- Ralph Amoussou, actor and thespian
- Josephine Baker, dancer, singer, actress, wartime spy for the Free French Resistance and French Airforce lieutenant nurse
- Edmond Dédé, French-American Classical musician and composer from New Orleans, Louisiana who settled in France in the early 1860s
- Erwan Kepoa Falé, actor
- Darling Légitimus, Volpi Cup for Best Actress-winning actress
- Euzhan Palcy, film director, screenwriter, and producer, Academy Honorary Award lifetime distinction recipient
- Guillaume Guillon-Lethière, painter
- Élé Asu, journalist and TV presenter of Nigerian descent
- Édouard Montoute, French actor and thespian
- Dominique Thimbakala, TV newscaster for BFM TV
- Kareen Guiock, TV newscaster for M6
- Mouss Diouf, actor
- Aude Legastelois, actress
- Ladj Ly, film director and screenwriter
- Aya Nakamura, singer
- Miss Dominique, singer
- Fabe, rapper
- Hélène and Célia Faussart (Les Nubians), singing duo
- Aissa Maiga, actress
- Sonia Rolland, actress

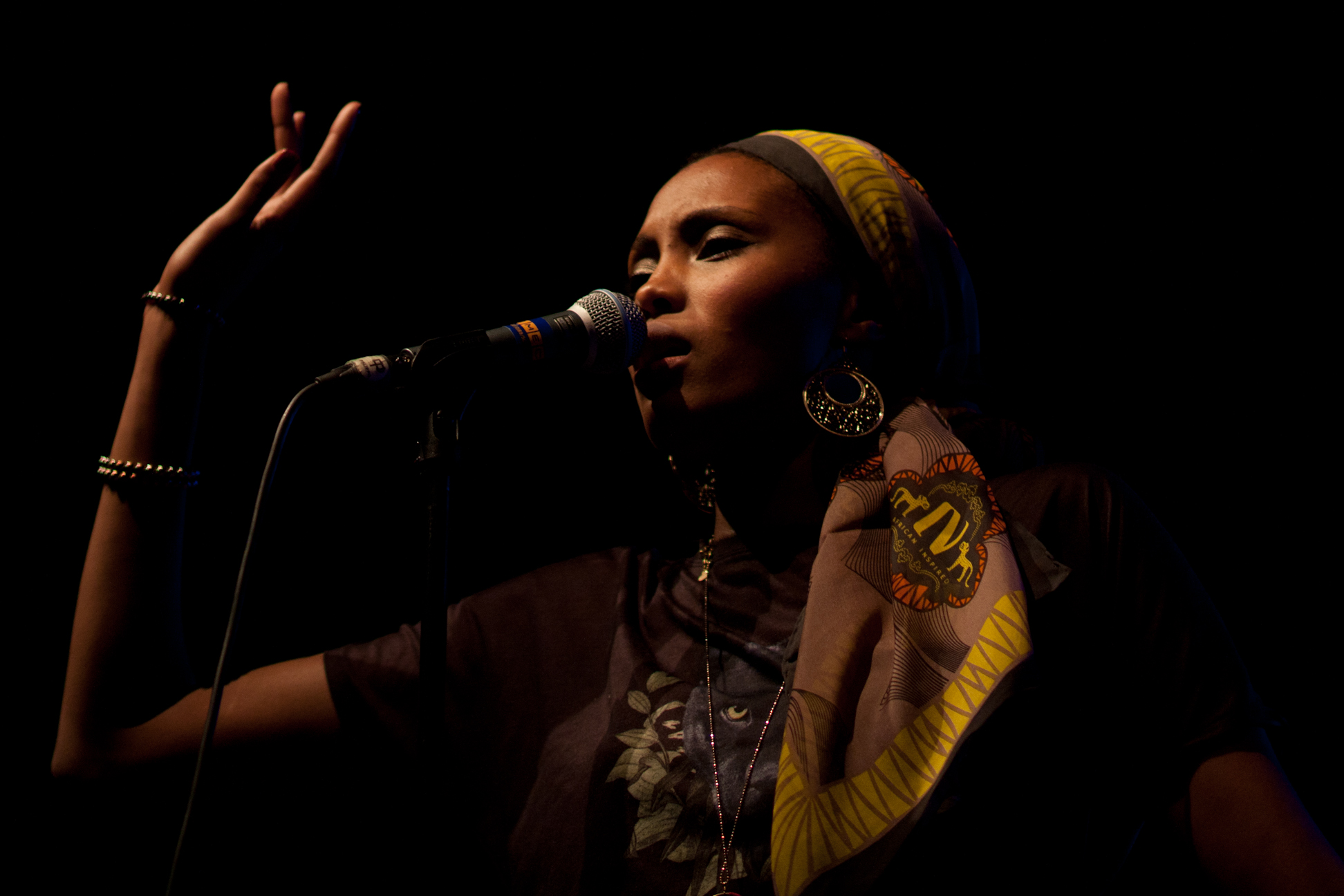
Singer Imany

- Imany, singer
- Hubert Kounde, actor and thespian
- Lord Kossity, Dancehall musician
- Dieudonné, comedian and anti-Zionist activist
- Fab Morvan, model and singer, half of Milli Vanilli
- Audrey Pulvar, newscaster and journalist
- Firmine Richard, actress
- Dominik Bernard, stage and film actor and director of Guadeloupe origin
- Harry Roselmack, newscaster
- Omar Sy, César-winning actor
- Tété, French pop-folk-blues composer-writer-interpreter, of Martinique and Senegalese descent, often likened to a Francophone Jeff Buckley
- Steve Tientcheu, actor
- Olivier Coipel, comic book artist
- Bukola Elemide, Female musician
- Koba LaD, rapper
- Black M, rapper
- Booba, rapper
- Gims, rapper
- Lefa, rapper
- MHD, rapper
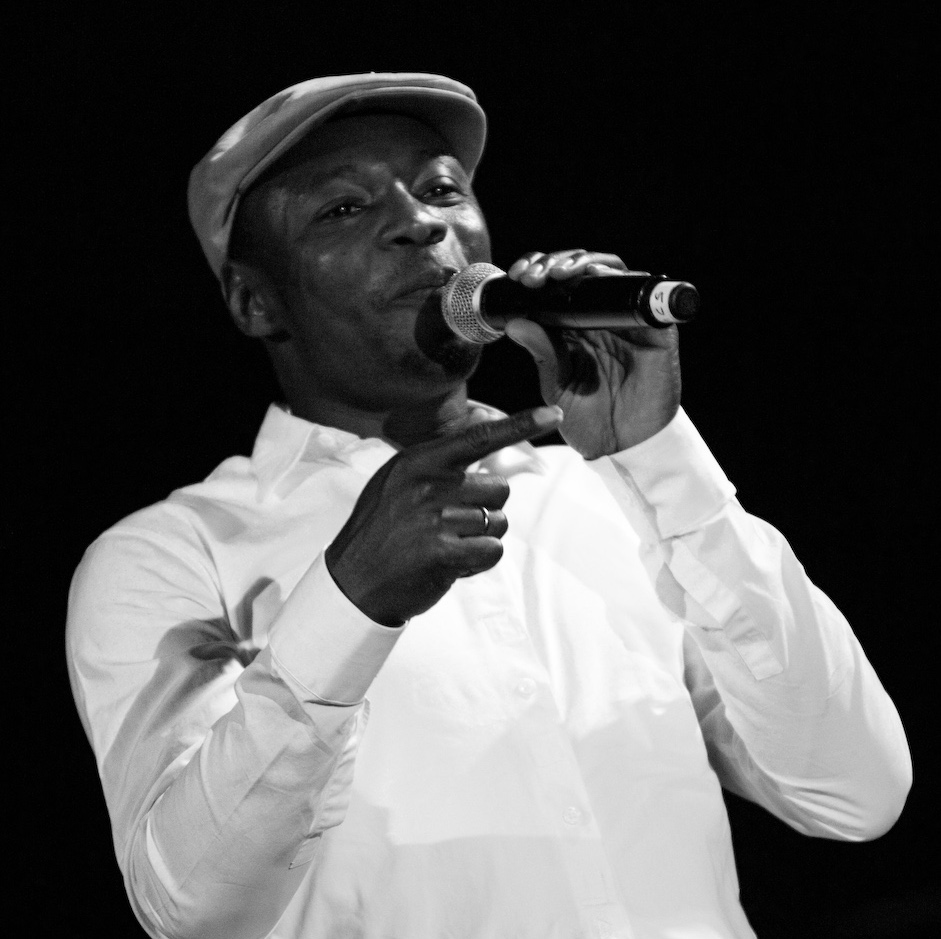
- Rapper MC Solaar
  MC Solaar, cult French rapper
- Niska, rapper
- Dadju, singer
- Shy'm, pop singer
- Les Twins, new-style hip-hop dancers
- Ziak (fr), rapper
- Jacky Brown and Ben-J (Nèg' Marrons (fr)), reggae & hip-hop duo

=== In literature ===
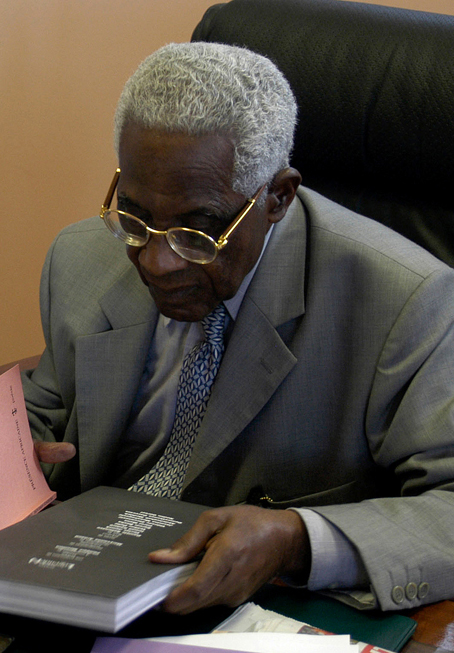
Martinican writer, poet and politician Aimé Césaire

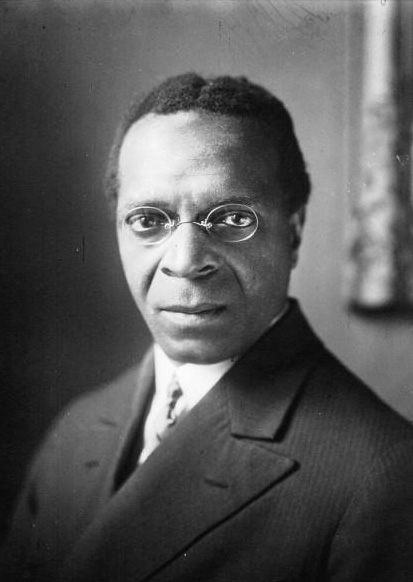
René Maran in 1930

- Calixthe Beyala, writer
- Aimé Césaire, writer
- Suzanne Césaire, writer
- Maryse Condé, writer
- Raphaël Confiant, writer and academic
- Léon Damas, writer
- Gerty Dambury, writer, educator and theatre director from Guadeloupe
- Fatou Diome, best-selling and award-winning author of Senegalese origin
- David Diop, novelist and academic researcher in 18th-century French and Francophone African literature
- Édouard Glissant, writer
- Viktor Lazlo, singer, actress and novelist
- René Maran, poet and novelist, first black writer to win the French Prix Goncourt (in 1921)
- Daniel Maximin, poet, novelist, essayist
- Jeanne Nardal, writer, philosopher, teacher, and political commentator from Martinique
- Paulette Nardal, writer and journalist
- Marie NDiaye, writer
- Gaël Octavia, writer, playwright, film director and painter
- Daniel Picouly, author
- Gisèle Pineau, novelist, writer and former psychiatric nurse
- Claude Ribbe, writer, activist and filmmaker
- Raphaël Tardon, writer, novelist and essayist of Martinique origin
- Guy Tirolien, poet
- Joseph Zobel, author of several novels and short-stories

=== European / African (or Afro-Caribbean) descent ===
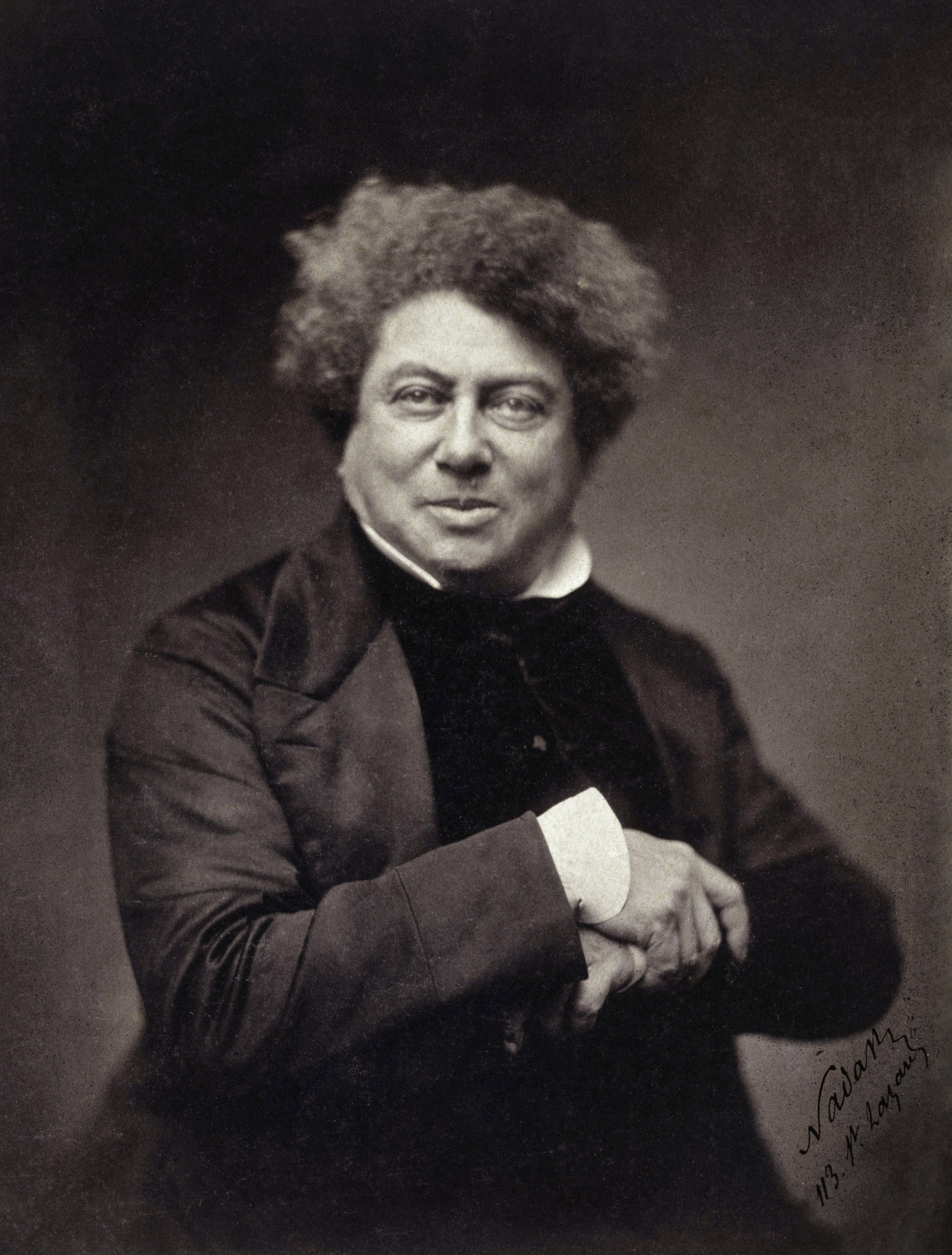
Alexandre Dumas, one of the most important French novelists of the 19th century (The Count of Monte Cristo, The Three Musketeers...).

- Alexandre Dumas, writer
- Alexandre Dumas fils, writer
- Thomas-Alexandre Dumas, general in the French Revolution and father of Alexandre Dumas
- Thierry Dusautoir, rugby player
- Chevalier de Saint-Georges, composer, conductor, and violinist, master fencer and military man
- Rudy Gobert, basketball player
- Noémie Lenoir, model
- Chevalier de Meude-Monpas, French musician and composer
- Chloé Mortaud, Miss France 2009
- Anais Mali, model
- Sonia Rolland, actress, Miss France 2000
- Jo-Wilfried Tsonga, tennis player
- Gaël Monfils, tennis player
- Flora Coquerel, Miss France 2014
- Alicia Aylies, Miss France 2017
- Willy William, singer and producer
- Cindy Bruna, model
- Ciryl Gane, mixed martial artist

=== Others ===
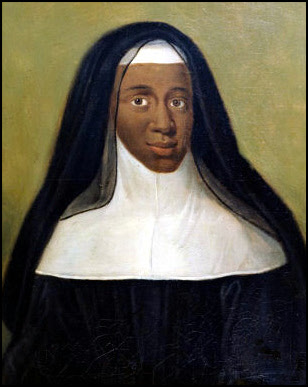
A painting of black nun Louise Marie Thérèse, from 1695

- Louise Marie Thérèse (1664-1732), a Benedictine nun of Moret and probably the illegitimate daughter of Louis XIV

== See also ==
- Zaire (now the DR Congo)
- Belgium
- Switzerland
- African Americans in France
- Haitians in France
- Racism in France
- African diaspora
