= Black conservatism =

Conservatism among communities of African descent

Black conservatism is a political and social philosophy emphasizing traditionalism, patriotism, self-sufficiency, and strong cultural and social conservatism within the context of the black church. In the United States it is often, but not exclusively, associated with the Republican Party.

== Overview ==
One of the main characteristics of black conservatism is its emphasis on personal responsibility and traditionalism. Black conservatives may find common ground with black nationalists through their common belief in black empowerment and the theory that black people have been duped by the welfare state. For many black conservatives, the singular objective is to bring social redemption and economic success to the black community.

== Worldwide ==
=== Africa ===
In the Post–Cold War era, a number of avowedly conservative parties have developed in most African countries. In countries where the population is divided by religion (i.e., Nigeria), conservative parties are often formed and constituted to target specific religions in their areas of greatest political dominance. However, some have argued that many African political parties lack the same kind of ideological conflict that is common in Western countries.

Historically, differences in political platforms in Africa sometimes depended on outside influence from either the West, Cuba or the former Soviet Union as a result of proxy conflicts during the Cold War period where militant factions of political parties received economic support from either America or Soviet aligned states. During the Cold War, some African political parties which adhered to Marxism-Leninism or Maoism when participating in anti-colonial activities later adopted economic, social and culturally conservative policies upon their country gaining independence and as democracy in African states crystallized, as well as in response to growing factional opposition to communism. An example of a formerly left-wing and now conservative party is UNITA in Angola, which under the leadership of Jonas Savimbi began as a far-left, Maoist inspired movement before embracing a right-wing platform and aligning itself with the West in the 1980s. Since transforming itself into a democratic political party, UNITA is presently considered to be conservative and right-leaning. Similarly, Kenya's first Prime Minister and later President Jomo Kenyatta was reportedly sympathetic or interested in socialism and communism prior to coming to power, but upon Kenya's independence from Britain he and his Kenya African National Union party adopted conservative beliefs, including stressing the importance of individual rights and according to historian Wunyabari O. Maloba, "sought to project capitalism as an African ideology, and communism (or socialism) as alien and dangerous."

Until 1980, Liberia was largely dominated by True Whig Party whose policies and namesake were initially influenced by that of the United States Whig Party. In 2017, the recently established right-wing conservative Jubilee Party of Kenya went on to gain a majority in the election held that year and became the ruling party of Kenya. The Jubilee Party and KANU are part of Azimio la Umoja.

=== Canada ===
Notable black conservatives in Canada include Senator Anne Cools and Senator Donald Oliver, both of whom serve in the Senate of Canada. Senator Oliver is a member of the Conservative Party of Canada, while Cools is a non-aligned Senator recognized as voting mainly with the Conservative caucus. Lincoln Alexander was Canada's first black MP, and served as a Federal Member of Parliament between 1968 and 1980 in the riding of Hamilton West. Former Alberta MLAs Lindsay Blackett and George Rogers (Alberta politician) and Alberta MLA Kaycee Madu are members of the Conservative Party. Kaycee Madu made history in 2020 when he became the first black Minister of Justice and Solicitor General in Canadian history. Madu inaugurated the Association of Black Conservatives in Canada in February 2020. Dr. Akolisa Ufodike is the founder and the inaugural National Chair.

In 2018, three black members of Coalition Avenir Québec were elected to the National Assembly of Quebec; Nadine Girault, Samuel Poulin and Christopher Skeete.

In 2018, Belinda Karahalios became the first black Progressive Conservative member of the Legislative Assembly of Ontario.

In 2019, Audrey Gordon became one of the first black members of the Legislative Assembly of Manitoba.

In 2020, lawyer and politician Leslyn Lewis announced her candidacy in the 2020 Conservative Party of Canada leadership election; she is the first ethnic minority figure to run for the leadership of the Conservatives.

=== Europe ===
In Western Europe, there have been blacks in centre-right and right-wing conservative parties in official roles or as elected representatives. In Germany Charles M. Huber became the first of two black MPs elected to the German Bundestag during the 2013 federal elections representing the CDU. In 2023, Joe Chialo became Senator for Culture and Social Cohesion of Berlin. Harald Weyel, first elected in 2017 to the German Bundestag, from the AfD is of African-American descent. In Belgium, journalist and social activist Assita Kanko was elected to the European Parliament for the conservative and Flemish nationalist N-VA party in 2019.

In 2018, Toni Iwobi became Italy's first black Senator representing the right-wing Lega Nord party and helped to draft some of the Lega's policies for the 2018 Italian general election. Ignacio Garriga, the leader Vox in Catalonia, is Afro-Spaniard. In 2024, Marcus Santos who is Afro-Brazilian was elected to the Portuguese Assembly of the Republic for Chega. The founder of Nova Direita Ossanda Liber is of Angolan descent.

=== Israel ===
Ethiopian Jews, Falash Mura and Jews of African descent have become more visible in politics as elected Members of The Knesset (MKs), including within the conservative Likud party. Notable black MKs have included Alali Adamso, Avraham Neguise, Gadi Yevarkan, and Moshe Solomon.

=== United Kingdom ===
The Conservative Party was critical of immigration from the Commonwealth during the 1950s and 1960s, culminating in the infamous Rivers of Blood speech delivered by leading Conservative MP Enoch Powell. Despite this, there have long been a small number of black Conservatives. Compared to the United States, the racial divide in the United Kingdom is less pronounced along party lines, due to the difference in racial relations.

Although black communities in the UK had traditionally supported Labour, the Conservatives began to actively circulate advertisements aimed at black voters under Margaret Thatcher ahead of the 1983 United Kingdom general election, with themes revolving around equal opportunities, better representation in the police and economic prosperity. Black British political consultant and writer Anita Boateng argued in a 2020 blogpost that black voters began to take more notice of the Conservative Party in the 1980s and 1990s due to their messages based on faith, family values, discipline and aspiration.

Most, although not all, black Conservatives in the United Kingdom are of African origin, with either one or both parents originating from Africa and emigrating to the UK, rather than from the Caribbean or elsewhere. In 2019, the Conservatives changed tactics to focus on promoting candidates based on talent rather than race to avoid accusations of tokenism. Black British Conservative MPs currently serving in the House of Commons are Adam Afriyie, Kwasi Kwarteng, James Cleverly, Kemi Badenoch, Darren Henry, Bim Afolami and solicitor and businesswoman Helen Grant. In the 2019 United Kingdom general election, the Conservatives fielded a record number of 76 black and ethnic minority candidates, a 72% increase on the 2017 election.

Ahead of the 2021 London mayoral election, the Conservatives selected former youth worker and journalist Shaun Bailey as their candidate.

Conservative MP Kemi Badenoch was a candidate during the July 2022 Conservative Party leadership election and was elected leader in 2024.

The eurosceptic UK Independence Party has selected a number of ethnic minority and black candidates to stand for office including Winston McKenzie, London Assembly member David Kurten, and MEP Steven Woolfe. Television chef Rustie Lee was also selected, but later renounced her support.

Other notable black conservatives in the United Kingdom include education reformer and writer Katharine Birbalsingh, who described her views as being "small c conservative – a social conservative", according to BBC News, and commentators Calvin Robinsonand Inaya Folarin Iman.

=== United States ===
Black conservatism in the United States is a political and social movement that aligns largely with the American conservative movement. During slavery, there was a divide between free blacks and slaves. As black people were released from slavery, they assimilated white American culture in order to maintain a place in the social order. This is where characteristics of contemporary black conservatism began to develop. The argument behind this was the idea that if black people follow the rules of White America, then there will be no choice but to accept them into the social system.

Since the Civil Rights Movement in the later 20th century, the African-American community has generally swung to the left of the right-wing conservative movement, and has predominantly favored itself on the side of liberalism.

American Black conservatism emphasizes traditionalism, strong patriotism, capitalism, free markets, and opposition to abortion and gay marriage in the context of the black church.

In the post civil rights-era, there was a push for continuous assimilation and, as a result, some black individuals aligned themselves with the conservative movement and accepted the idea of a color-blind society.

Condoleezza Rice and General Colin Powell were two prominent politicians of the Republican Party in 1990s and 2000s. Some elected black conservatives include Florida representative Allen West, U.S. Senator Tim Scott of South Carolina, former Oklahoma representative J.C. Watts, and former Connecticut representative Gary Franks. Other notable black conservatives include economist Thomas Sowell, perennial political candidate Alan Keyes, and Supreme Court justice Clarence Thomas. In 2009, Michael Steele became the first black man to chair the Republican National Committee. In 2011, Herman Cain was considered the leading candidate for the Republican presidential nomination for a period of time. Ben Carson, an African-American author and neurosurgeon, announced his candidacy for the 2016 Republican nomination in his hometown Detroit in May 2015, but ultimately lost the nomination to Donald Trump.

Kanye West, African-American rapper, has associated himself with the Trump movement.

Glenn Loury and John McWhorter are black conservative public intellectuals.

== Black conservative ideologies ==
=== Color-blind America ===
The colorblind America argument is one that often comes up in conservative discourse. It is the idea the decisions and legislation are made without regard to racial identity. Black conservatives assert that, because there has been a post-civil rights era push in the conservative movement to rally behind this colorblind conservative ideology, that it actually hinders the black community's progress to oppose it. They claim that by refusing to recognize this discourse, black individuals are not focusing on racial development. This partially explains the opposition to affirmative action amongst black conservatives. They claim that this type of government intervention in black mobility actually does more to question the ability of black individuals to succeed than it does to provide well-earned opportunities that would otherwise be inaccessible.

=== Individualism ===
Individualism is where individuals are personally responsible for pursuing success in their own self-interest. Black conservatives are in favor of individualism and oppose government interventions such as affirmative action because they do not want it to raise the question of whether or not they deserve the successes they have achieved or if they took part in what some refer to as "reverse racism". Black conservatives oppose policies such as affirmative action that were created with the intention of creating opportunity for minorities who have been historically oppressed in the United States. Black conservatives justify this because they are opposed to any policy that may be perceived by Whites as an unearned benefit or a handout. Clarence Thomas described affirmative action as problematic because it reinforces stereotypes of black individuals being inferior. He claimed it leads to personal doubt and stifles individuality.

=== Christian evangelism ===
Historian Gregory Schneider identifies several constants in American conservatism: respect for tradition, support of republicanism, "the rule of law and the Christian religion", and a defense of "Western civilization from the challenges of modernist culture and totalitarian governments." Black conservatives are motivated by two of the values of general conservative thought, for the love of God and country. The black church specifically is linked to Christian evangelism, and a dependence on God and his plans. These plans are part of what allow black conservatives to get behind the ideas of individualism that conservatism is built on. Though it may seem antithetical to reconcile the history of slavery and segregation with the ideas of complete American freedom and equality, it is actually the hope of reaching that goal without having to depend on their oppressors that makes individualism appealing to some people in the black community.

According to a 2014 Pew Research Center poll, African-Americans today are generally found to be more likely to identify as Christian and Protestant than whites or Latinos in the United States, with 79% of black Americans identifying as Christian compared to 77% of Latinos and 70% of white Americans.

=== Social issues ===
Similarly to white and Hispanic Americans, African-American stances on social issues can sometimes be influenced by religious beliefs as well. According to a 2017 Pew Research Center poll, 44% of black Protestants supported gay marriage, compared with 67% of Catholics and 68% of "white mainline Protestants". In another Pew poll conducted around the same time, black Protestants are also sharply divided on the issue of abortion, with a slight majority of 55% saying it should be legal in most or all cases, and 44% believing it should be illegal.

== Notable black conservatives in politics ==
- Lincoln Alexander
- CJ Pearson
- Adam Afriyie
- Kemi Badenoch
- Shaun Bailey
- Lindsay Blackett
- Akolisa Ufodike
- Katharine Birbalsingh
- Ken Blackwell
- Deneen Borelli
- Herman Cain
- Daniel Cameron
- Lionel Carmant
- Ben Carson
- Ernest Chénière
- David Clarke
- Diamond and Silk
- Ward Connerly
- Anne Cools
- Stanley Crouch
- James Cleverly
- Byron Donalds
- Christian Dubé
- Xaviaer DuRousseau
- Winsome Earle-Sears
- Larry Elder
- Ignacio Garriga
- Nadine Girault
- Audrey Gordon
- Ayaan Hirsi Ali
- Wesley Hunt
- Will Hurd
- Zora Neale Hurston
- Darren Henry
- Inaya Folarin Iman
- Niger Innis
- Toni Iwobi
- Kay Coles James
- John E. James
- Assita Kanko
- Belinda Karahalios
- Jomo Kenyatta
- Uhuru Kenyatta
- Alan Keyes
- Alveda King
- Angela Stanton-King
- Kimberly Klacik
- Kwasi Kwarteng
- Leslyn Lewis
- Mia Love
- Kaycee Madu
- Don Meredith
- Kenneth Meshoe
- Lucette Michaux-Chevry
- Ossufo Momade
- Isaiah Montgomery
- Deroy Murdock
- Donald Oliver
- Burgess Owens
- Candace Owens
- Brandon Tatum
- Star Parker
- Charles Payne
- Marie-Luce Penchard
- Jesse Lee Peterson
- Maxette Grisoni-Pirbakas
- Maurice Ponga
- Samuel Poulin
- Condoleezza Rice
- Arthur Richards
- Gabriel Mithá Ribeiro
- Calvin Robinson
- Mark Robinson
- George Rogers
- Isaías Samakuva
- George Schuyler
- Tim Scott
- Winsome Sears
- Christopher Skeete
- Kiron Skinner
- Thomas Sowell
- Michael Steele
- Shelby Steele
- Carol Swain
- Lynn Swann
- Brandon Tatum
- Clarence Thomas
- Michael Thompson
- William Tubman
- Dick Ukeiwé
- João Varela
- Herschel Walker
- Booker T. Washington
- J. C. Watts
- Allen West
- Jason Whitlock
- Armstrong Williams
- Rama Yade

== See also ==
- List of African American Republicans
- Hip Hop Republican
- Black leftism
- Black capitalism
