= Arthur Richards =

Arthur Richards may refer to:

- Arthur Richards, 1st Baron Milverton (1885–1978), British colonial administrator
- Arthur Richards (cricketer) (1865–1930), English cricketer
- Arthur Richards (French politician) (1890–1972), member of the French National Assembly, 1958–1967
- Arthur Shapton Richards (1877–1947), New Zealand politician of the Labour Party
