= Representative Council of Black Associations =

Anti-racist organizations in France

The Conseil représentatif des associations noires de France (CRAN, "Representative Council of France's Black Associations") is a federation of African and Afro-Caribbean associations in France, created in November 2005.

The first chairperson of CRAN was the Bénin-born Patrick Lozès, which is son of former Beninese Minister Gabriel Lozès, elected in 2005 and reelected in 2008. In November 2011 he was succeeded by the Martinique-born Louis-Georges Tin, an LGBT activist.
