= Olivier Davidas =

French footballer (born 1981)

Personal information
- Date of birth: 8 November 1981 (age 45)
- Place of birth: Le Havre, France
- Height: 1.74 m (5 ft 9 in)
- Position: Midfielder

Youth career
- 2000–2002: Le Havre AC

Senior career*
Years	Team	Apps	(Gls)
2002–2010	Le Havre AC	135	(4)
2010–2011	Nîmes Olympique	23	(1)
2012–2013	Gazélec Ajaccio	22	(0)
Total		180	(5)
- * Club domestic league appearances and goals

Olivier Davidas (born 8 November 1981) is a French retired professional footballer who played as a midfielder.

== Career ==
Born in Le Havre, Davidas began his career 2000 with local side Le Havre AC.
