= Chevalier de Meude-Monpas =

French classical musician, conductor and composer

- Born: Paris, France
- Notable work: Concerto in D (1786)
- Style: Classical

The Chevalier de Meude-Monpas (fl. c. 1780-1790) was a French composer, musician, author, and royalist of the 18th-century. Meude-Monpas was otherwise known as J.J.O. de Meude-Monpas (possibly Josse Jean-Olivier). He was a "gentilhomme-servant du roi", meaning he was on the king's payroll, and a composer and violinist, as well as a member of several academies.

== Career ==
Meude-Monpas was born in Paris and studied violin with Pierre Lahoussaye, and composition with Giroust, but later he claimed to be one of Jean-Jacques Rousseau's pupils. In 1786 Meude-Monpas published six concertos for violin, with 2 violins, viola, double bass, 2 oboes and 2 horns. Like many other members of the court, he left the country during the French Revolution and served for a time in a corps under the orders of the Prince de Condé. Later, Mme de Genlis met him in Berlin where he was writing and publishing poetry. She gave the poetry a bad review, an opinion shared by Framery, who criticized it as ignorant and absurd in the Mercure de France (ann. 1788, n.26).

On May 5, 1790, Meude-Monpas had an impromptu poem published in which he suggested that the Duke of Aiguillon had dressed as a woman to take part in the Women's March on Versailles (this was a preexisting legend) : "We have been transported to miraculous times. / While d'Aiguil ... disguises himself as a woman, / Antoinette becomes a brave man, / Worthy of honouring the noble blood of the House of Guise." Meude-Monpas denied that he had been referring to the duke. On May 23, the Marquis de Condorcet's Chronique de Paris jeered at him and reminded the public that Meude-Monpas was a self-styled "chevalier" - in fact, the son of a master goldsmith in Paris, a Mr. Josse "who would be amazed to see his youngest son has become a gentleman-servant and a chevalier (knight) in spite of his ancestors, and the Don Quixote of dukes, marquis and counts, his noble peers and friends."

An article by Camille Pelletan in Georges Clemenceau's newspaper La Justice, published on April 29, 1889, is an important source regarding Meude-Monpas. It describes a counter-revolutionary newspaper called "Le Petit Gautier" or, more officially, Le Journal de la Cour et de la Ville. François Jourgniac de Saint-Méard (1745-1827) and Jean-Olivier de Meude-Moupas were notable contributors.

== Personal life ==
Meude-Monpas was known as a staunch supporter of Louis XVI and had a public reputation. Nearly a century later, he became a character in a play by Edmond de Goncourt, La Patrie en Danger, drame en cinq actes, en prose, premiered on March 19, 1889 at the Théâtre Libre, salle des Menus-Plaisirs. (see Journal des débats politiques et littéraires, March 19, 1889). Meude-Monpas is mentioned in François-Joseph Fétis's Biographie universelle des musiciens et bibliographie générale de la musique. The author notes that Meude-Monpas was a "black musketeer" (which means that he belonged to a company riding black horses, not to another company, riding grey ones).

== Publications ==
Cover of Violin Concertos by Black Composers of the 18th and 19th Centuries, soloist Rachel Barton Pine, from Cedille Records

- A Dictionary of Music (Dictionnaire de musique dans lequel on simplifie les expressions et les définitions mathématiques et physiques qui ont rapport à cet art, avec des remarques impartiales sur les poètes lyriques, les vérificateurs, les compositeurs, acteurs, exécutans), 1787. Minkoff Reprint, Genève, 1981. Wentworth Press (2018).
- Réponse à la question proposée par M. l'abbé Raynal, adressée à l'Académie de Lyon : "Les Richesses toujours ont causé nos malheurs", 1788 https://catalogue.bnf.fr/ark:/12148/cb30935898h.public
- Quelques réflexions par le Chevalier J.-J.-O. de Meude-Monpas, 1789
- De l'influence de l'amour et de la musique sur les moeurs, avec des réflexions sur l'utilité que les gouvernements peuvent tirer de ces deux importantes passions, 1789
- Éloge de J. J. Rousseau: avec des anecdotes très-intéressantes relatives à ce grand homme, qui n'ont point encore été publiées, 1790. Wentworth Press (2018)
- Panthéon Littéraire, 1790

== Recordings ==
One of his concerti was recorded by Rachel Barton Pine – Cedille Records, 1997: CDR 90000 035.

A recording of his Concerto in D (1876) was included as part of a compilation of violin concertos of 18th and 19th century French composers in 1998.
