= Toni Iwobi =

Italian politician (born 1955)

Toni Iwobi OMRI
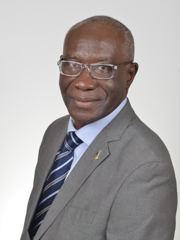

Member of the Italian Senate
- In office 23 March 2018 – 12 October 2022

Personal details
- Born: 26 April 1955 (age 71) Gusau, British Nigeria
- Party: Lega Nord
- Education: Pacific Western University
- Profession: Politician, entrepreneur

Tony Chike Iwobi (born 26 April 1955), better known as Toni Iwobi, is an Italian politician for Lega Nord who was elected to the Italian Senate in the 2018 general election.

== Early life and education ==
Born in the city of Gusau in northern Nigeria, he is of Igbo descent. He is one of 11 siblings in a Roman Catholic family. He attended Catholic schools. His mother tongue is Igbo and English.

He completed a degree in economics with specialization in marketing and business management in Manchester, England. He came to Italy on a student visa in 1976, and obtained a degree in accounting in Treviglio. He also has higher degrees (laurea) in computer science from the USA and Italy.

== Career ==
Iwobi is the founder and since 2001 managing director of Data Communication Labs Ltd. Previously he worked for AMSA (Azienda Milanese Servizi Ambientali) and has worked for a company in Roveredo, Switzerland. A supporter of federalism, which he knew from Nigeria, he became a member of Lega Nord, where he was particularly inspired by Gianfranco Miglio. In 1993, he was elected municipal councillor for the party in Spirano, a position he held until 2014. From 2010 to 2014 he also served as assessor with responsibility for social services.

Iwobi was in 2014 selected by party leader Matteo Salvini to draft Lega Nord's new immigration policy which had a hard stance against illegal immigration and played a big role in the party's campaign in the 2018 Italian general election.

In the 2018 general election he was elected to the Italian Senate, becoming the first black person to take a seat in the Senate.

He is general counsel of the Italy-USA Foundation.

He did not stand up for re-election in 2022.

== Personal life ==
He is married to an Italian woman, Lucia, and has two children, Elisabetta and Clifford.
