= Louis-Georges Tin =

French academic and activist

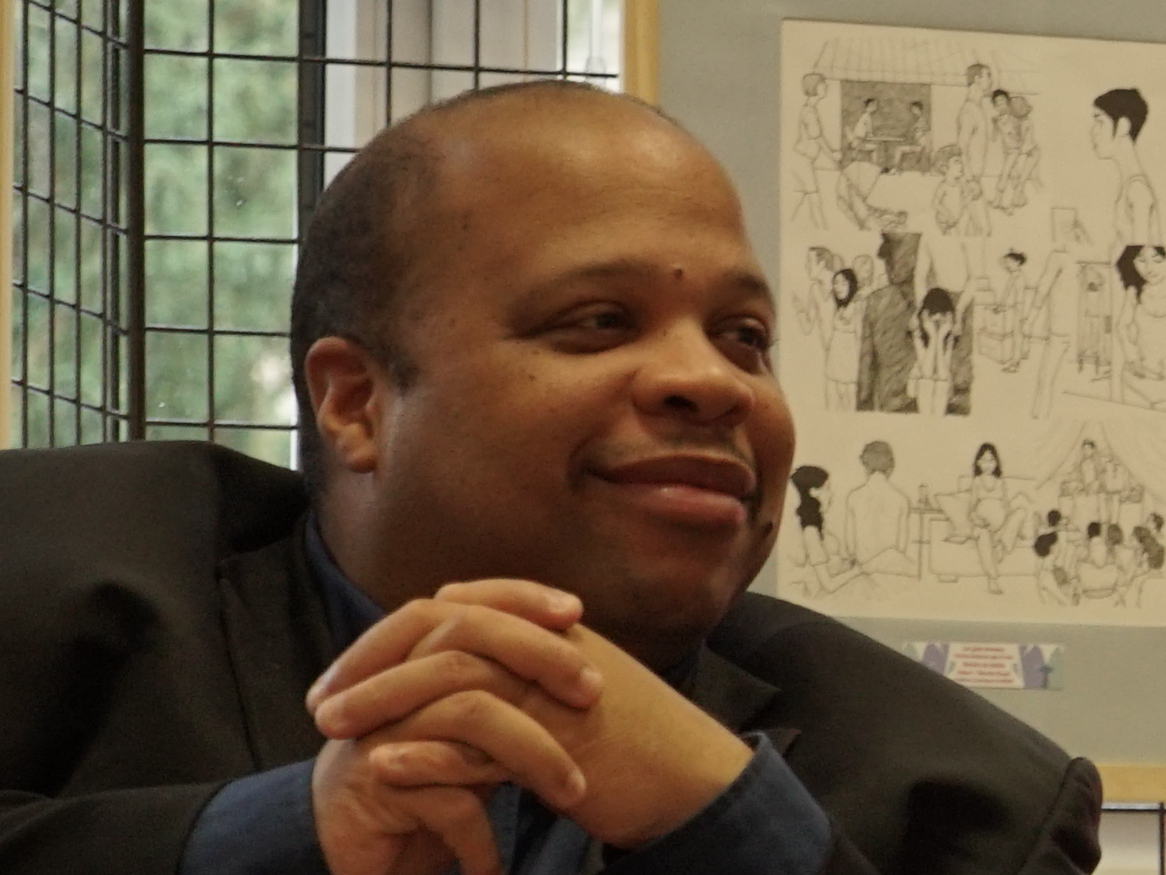
- Born: 1974 (age 51–52); Martinique
- Occupations: Academic, activist
- Organization(s): Representative Council of Black Associations (CRAN); International Day Against Homophobia, Biphobia and Transphobia

Louis-Georges Tin (born 1974) is a French academic, gay rights campaigner, and anti-racist activist. Tin is noted for initiating the International Day Against Homophobia, Biphobia and Transphobia, now marked in over 130 countries across the world, and co-founding the Representative Council of Black Associations (CRAN).

== Life ==
Louis-Georges Tin was born in Martinique in 1974. He studied at the Ecole Normale Supérieure in Paris, during which time - in 1997.- he co-founded activist organisation Homonormalités.

Tin was the editor of The Dictionary of Homophobia: a Global History of Gay & Lesbian Experience, first published in French in 2003 and later in an English translation.

In 2004, Tin founded Au Nou Allé ("Let's go" in Creole), a black LGBT association. In the same year, Louis-Georges Tin initiated what was initially known as the International Day Against Homophobia (IDAHO), celebrated on 17 May - the date in 1990 that homosexuality was declassified as a mental disorder by the World Health Organization.

The first IDAHO was marked in 2005. In his preface to the English language edition of the Dictionary, Tin wrote:

In my mind, it was an obvious extension of what I had hoped the Dictionary would achieve. At a time when the globalization of the world’s economy is on every national agenda, it is vital that we remain conscious of its political, ethical, and philosophical ramifications, which include equal rights for all. The first IDAHO was celebrated for the first time on May 17, 2005, fifteen years to the day after the World Health Organization decided to remove homosexuality from the list of mental illnesses; it was launched simultaneously in over forty countries, from Brazil to Russia, by way of Kenya, Canada, Portugal, and Lebanon.

In 2006, IDAHO launched a petition calling for the universal decriminalisation of homosexuality. The following year, Tin launched a campaign against transphobia, with a petition signed by 300 non-governmental organisations from over 75 countries.

In 2011, activists in France launched a bid to win Tin the Nobel Peace Prize. In 2012, he became President of the Representative Council of Black Associations (CRAN), an organisation he co-founded.

In 2014, Tin was made Prime Minister of the State of the African Diaspora.

== Bibliography ==
- Homosexualités: Expression/répression (with Geneviève Pastre) (2000)
- Anthologie de la poésie du XVIe siècle (with Jean Céard) (2005)
- The Dictionary of Homophobia: a Global History of Gay & Lesbian Experience (2003; 2008 in English)
- Le Théâtre catholique en France (with H. Phillips & A. Pichon) (2006)
- The Invention of Heterosexual Culture (2008; 2012 in English)
- Homosexualité: aimer en Grèce et à Rome (with Sandra Boehringer) (2010)
