= Ernest Chénière =

French politician (born 1945)

Ernest Chénière (French pronunciation: [ɛʁnɛst ʃenjɛʁ]; born 26 April 1945 in Rivière-Salée, Martinique) is a French politician who represented the department of Oise in the French National Assembly from 1993 to 1997.
