= Maxette Grisoni-Pirbakas =

French politician (born 1975)

Maxette Pirbakas
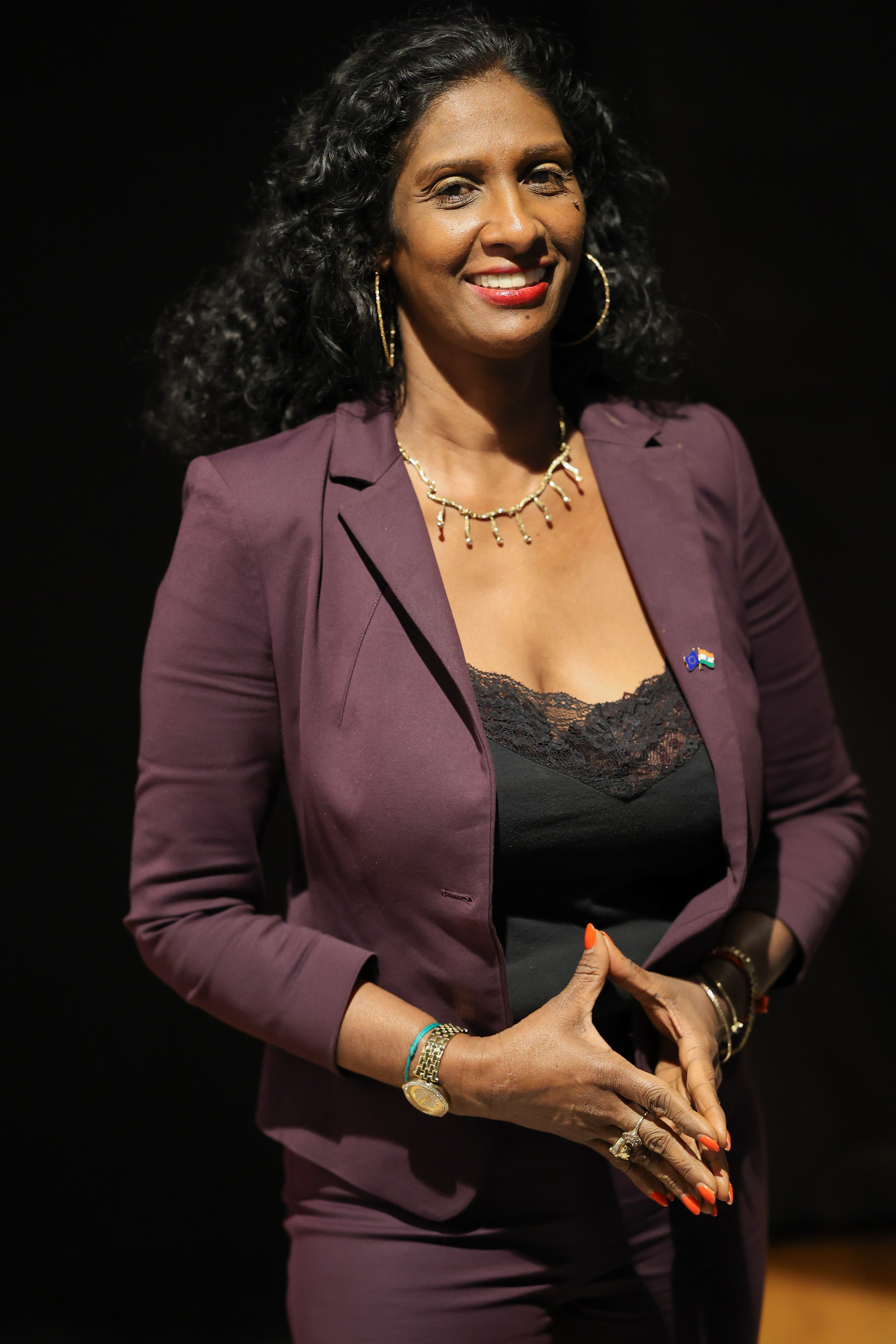

Spokesman of the National Rally
- In office 16 March 2019 – February 2022
- President: Marine Le Pen

Member of the European Parliament
- In office 2 July 2019 – 15 July 2024

Personal details
- Born: 14 April 1975 (age 51) Les Abymes, Guadeloupe, France
- Party: Independent
- Other political affiliations: National Rally (2019-2022); Reconquête (2022)

Maxette Grisoni-Pirbakas (French pronunciation: [maksɛt ɡʁizɔni piʁbakas]; born 14 April 1975) is a French politician from Guadeloupe. She was elected as a Member of the European Parliament for the National Rally (RN) in the 2019 election. She served as spokesperson for the RN from March 2019 to February 2022, when she defected to join the Reconquête party.

== Biography ==
She is the leader of the Fédération nationale des syndicats d'exploitants agricoles in Guadeloupe.

She has served in the European Parliament for the National Rally (RN) since 2019. She was her party's candidate in the 2021 French regional elections in Guadeloupe.

She defected to the Reconquête party in February 2022, endorsing Éric Zemmour in the presidential election. She was ordered to pay more than €160,000 to a former parliamentary assistant in 2024.
