= Arthur Richards (French politician) =

French politician (1890–1972)

Arthur Richards (19 June 1890 in Pointe-a-Pitre – 2 December 1972, Bordeaux) was a French politician who represented the department of Gironde in the French National Assembly from 1958 to 1967.
