= Hillsboro Cemetery =

Cemetery in Highland County, Ohio, US

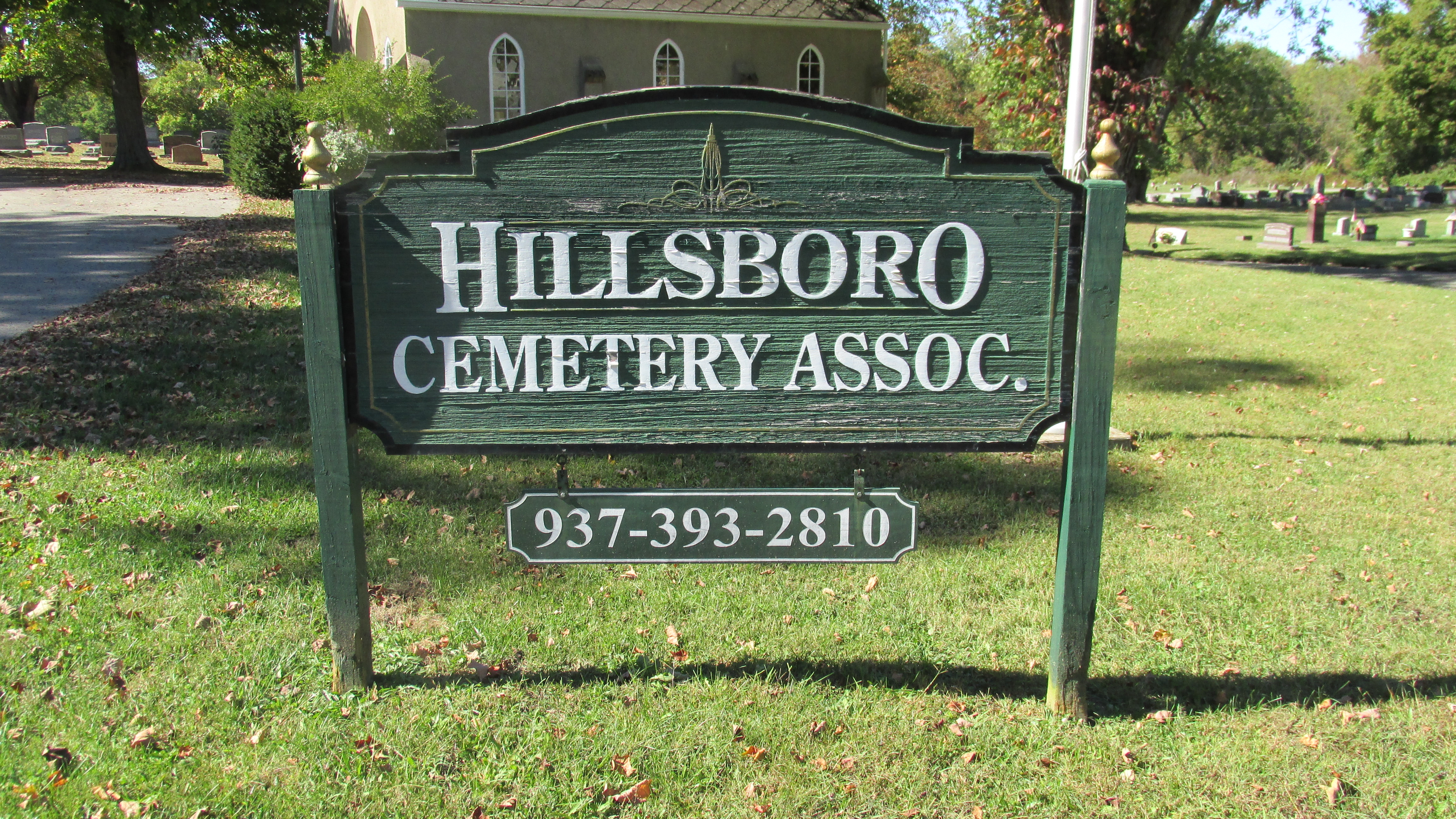

Details
- Established: 1862
- Coordinates: 39°12′53″N 83°36′13″W
- Size: 31 acres
- No. of graves: over 7,000
- Find a Grave: Hillsboro Cemetery

Hillsboro Cemetery is a cemetery located in Hillsboro, Ohio. The cemetery was initially known as the Greenwood Cemetery. On May 30, 1862, the Hillsborough (old spelling) Cemetery Association of the Town of Hillsborough purchased 31 acres, 1 quarter and 25 poles (12.7 hectare) of land from Allen and Rachel Trimble.

The fourth or fifth cemetery created within the Town of Hillsborough. On July 22, 1862, the association sold to the Lafayette Lodge No. 25 of the Independent Order of Odd Fellows of Hillsborough 4 acres, 1 quarter and 15 poles (1.75 hectare).

On August 21, 1883, the Lafayette Lodge conveyed back to the Association the land and one additional acre which Charles Wilson had deeded to the lodge for a roadway on December 13, 1878.

As of 2023, the cemetery is maintained by the Highland County Historical Society.

== Notable interments ==
- Baseball player Kirby White (1844–1943)
- Joseph J. McDowell (1800–1877)
- Jacob J. Pugsley (1838–1920)
- John Armstrong Smith (1814–1892)
- Allen Trimble (1783–1870)
- Wilbur M. White (1890–1973)

== Gallery ==
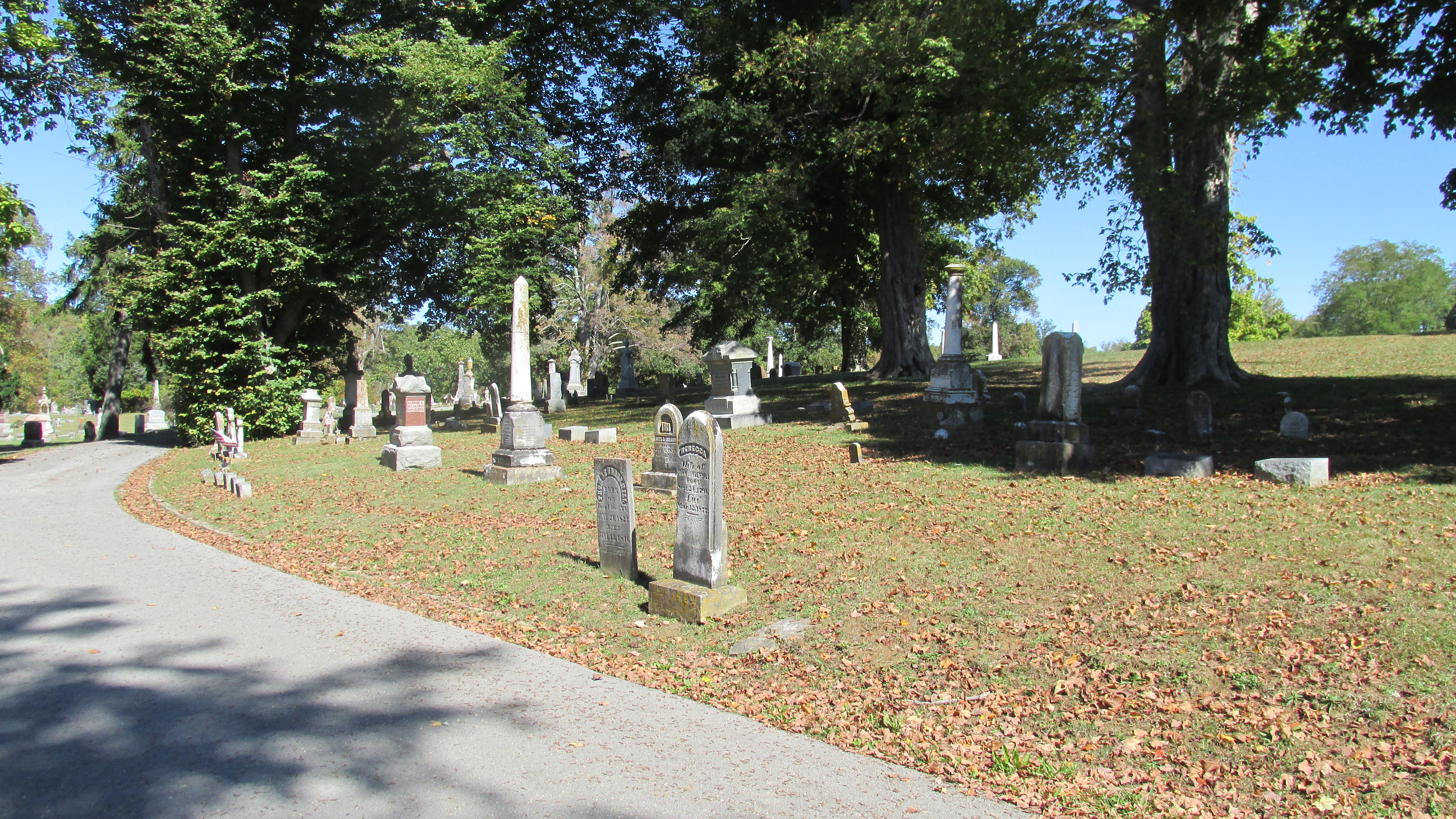
Section A

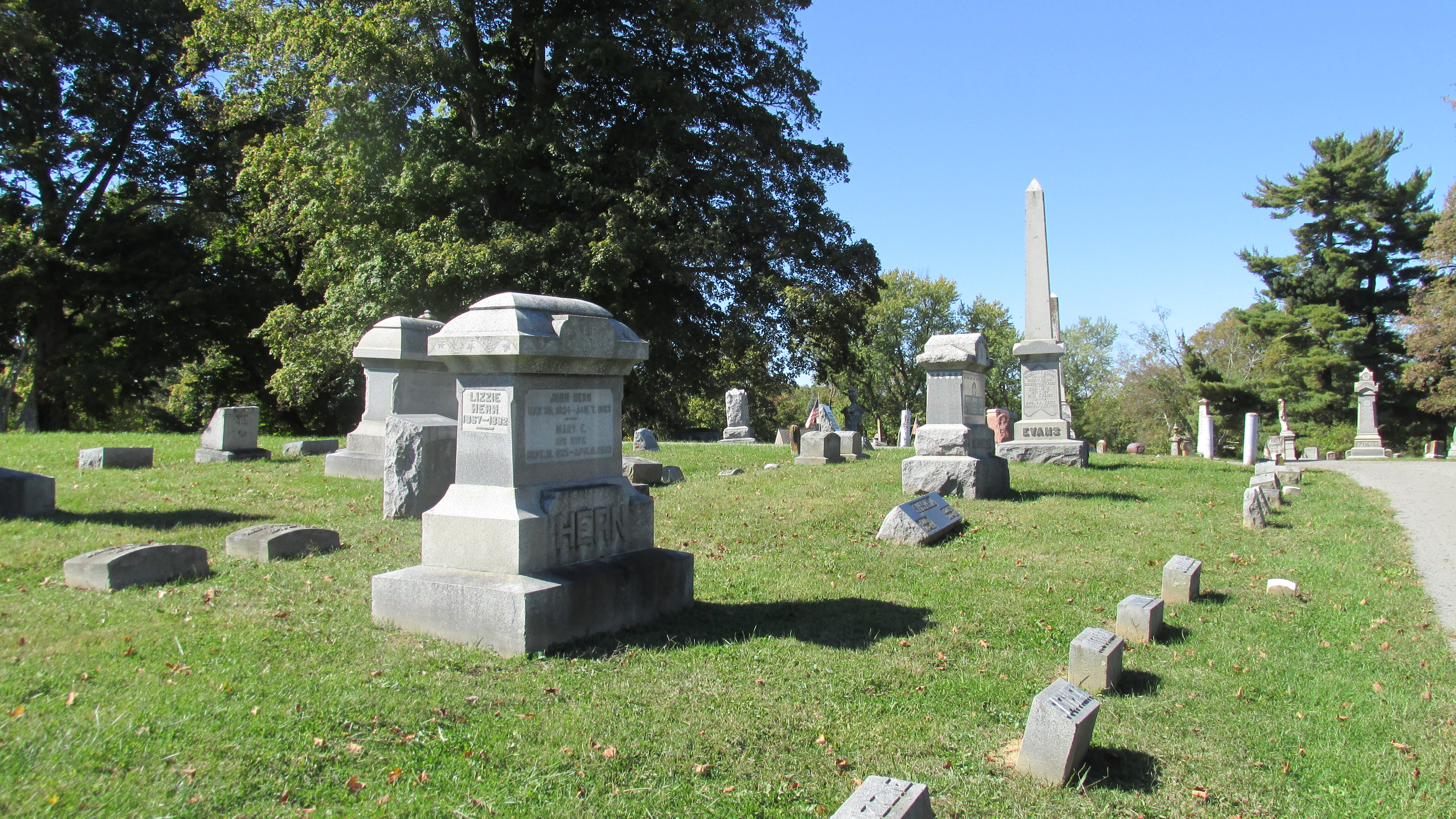
Section A

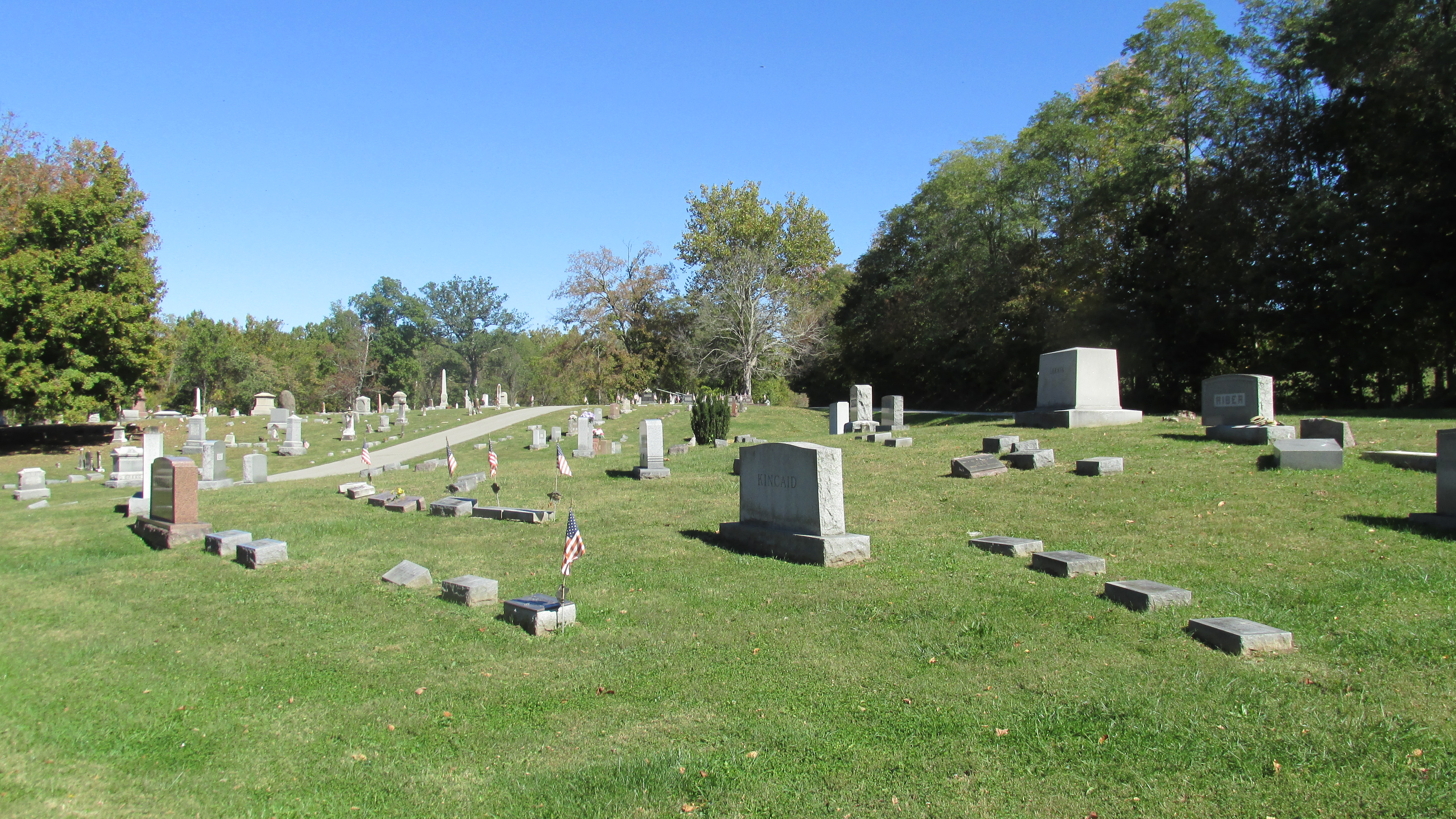
Section A

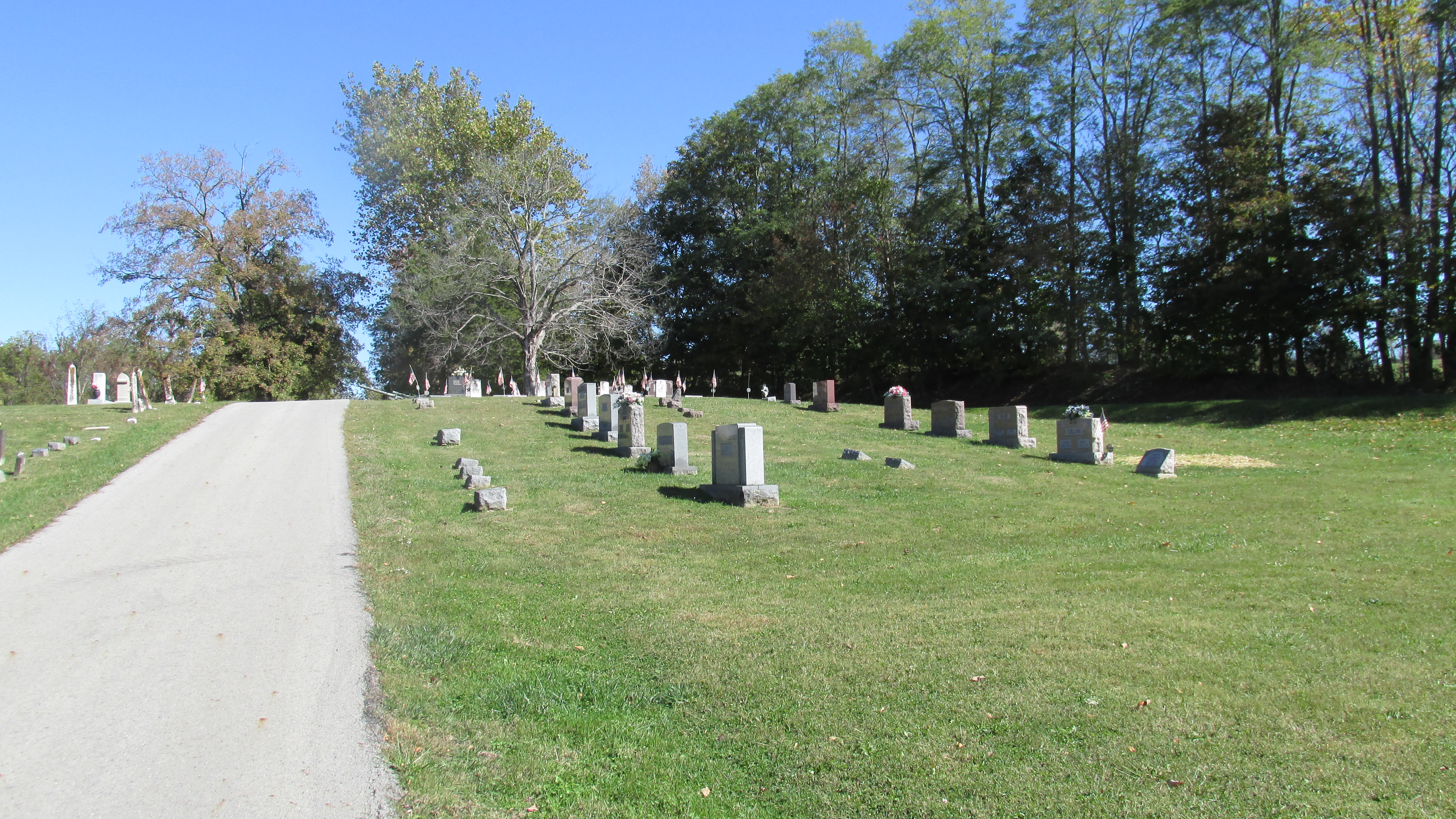
Section A

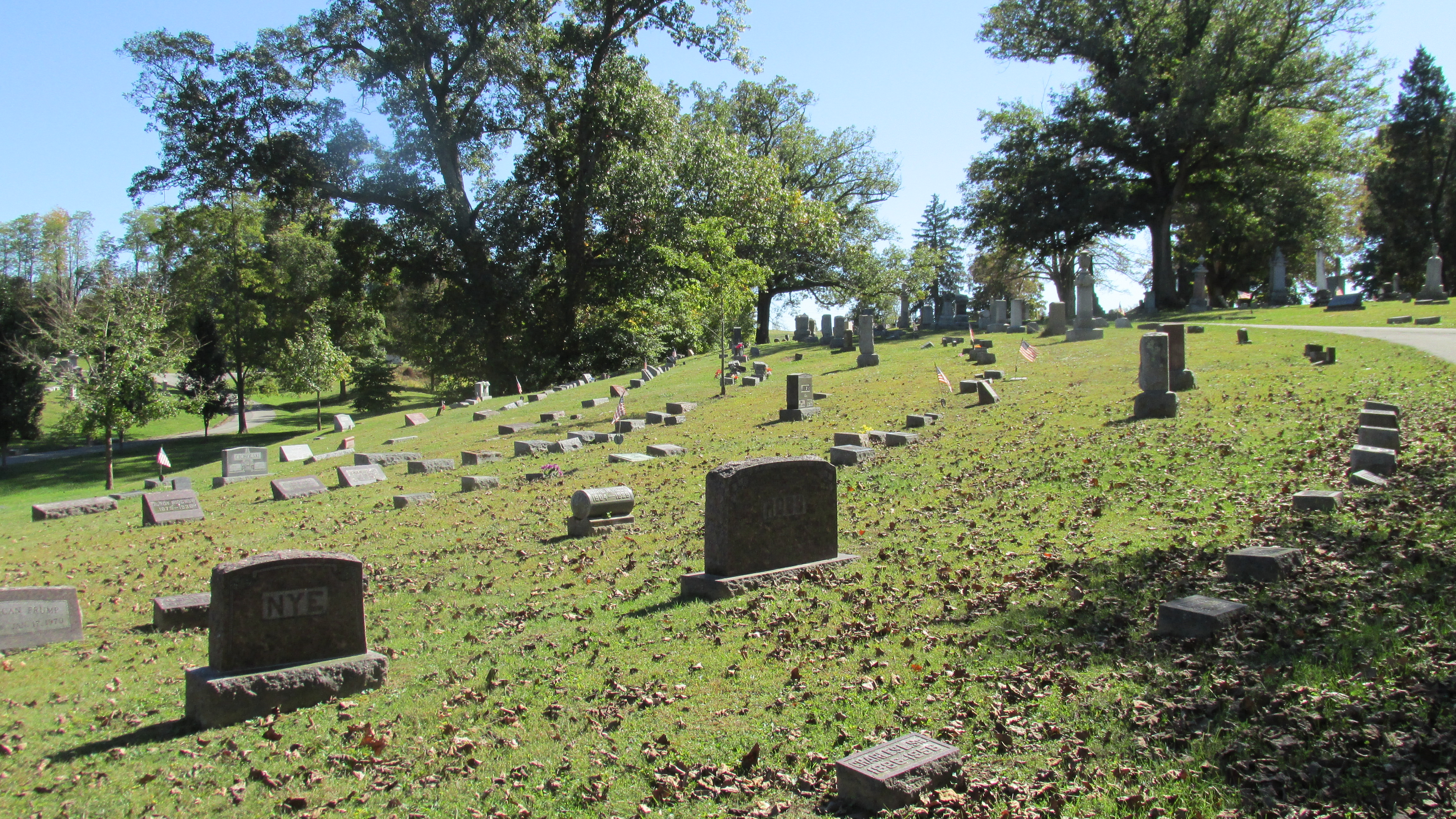
Section B

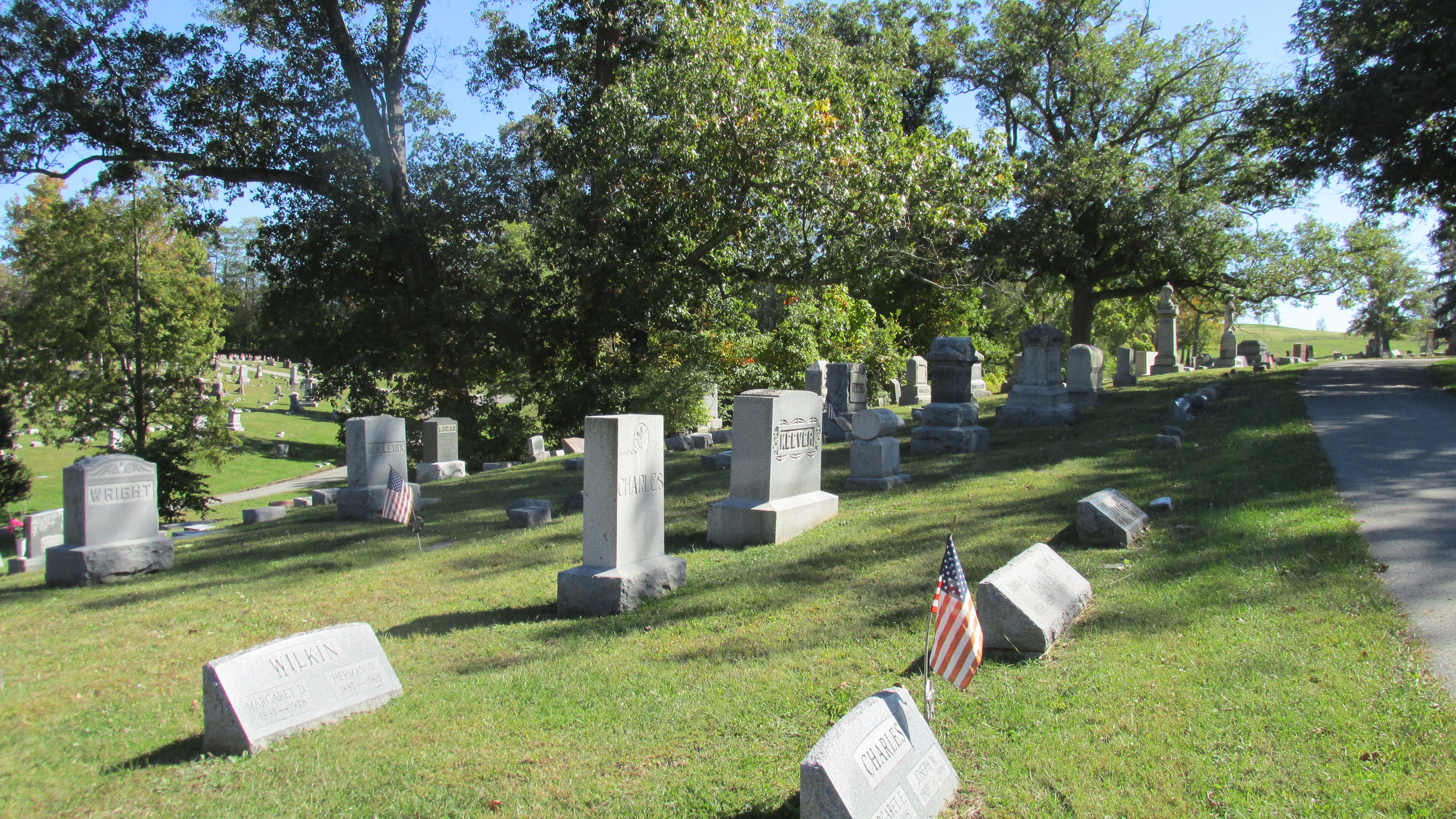
Section B

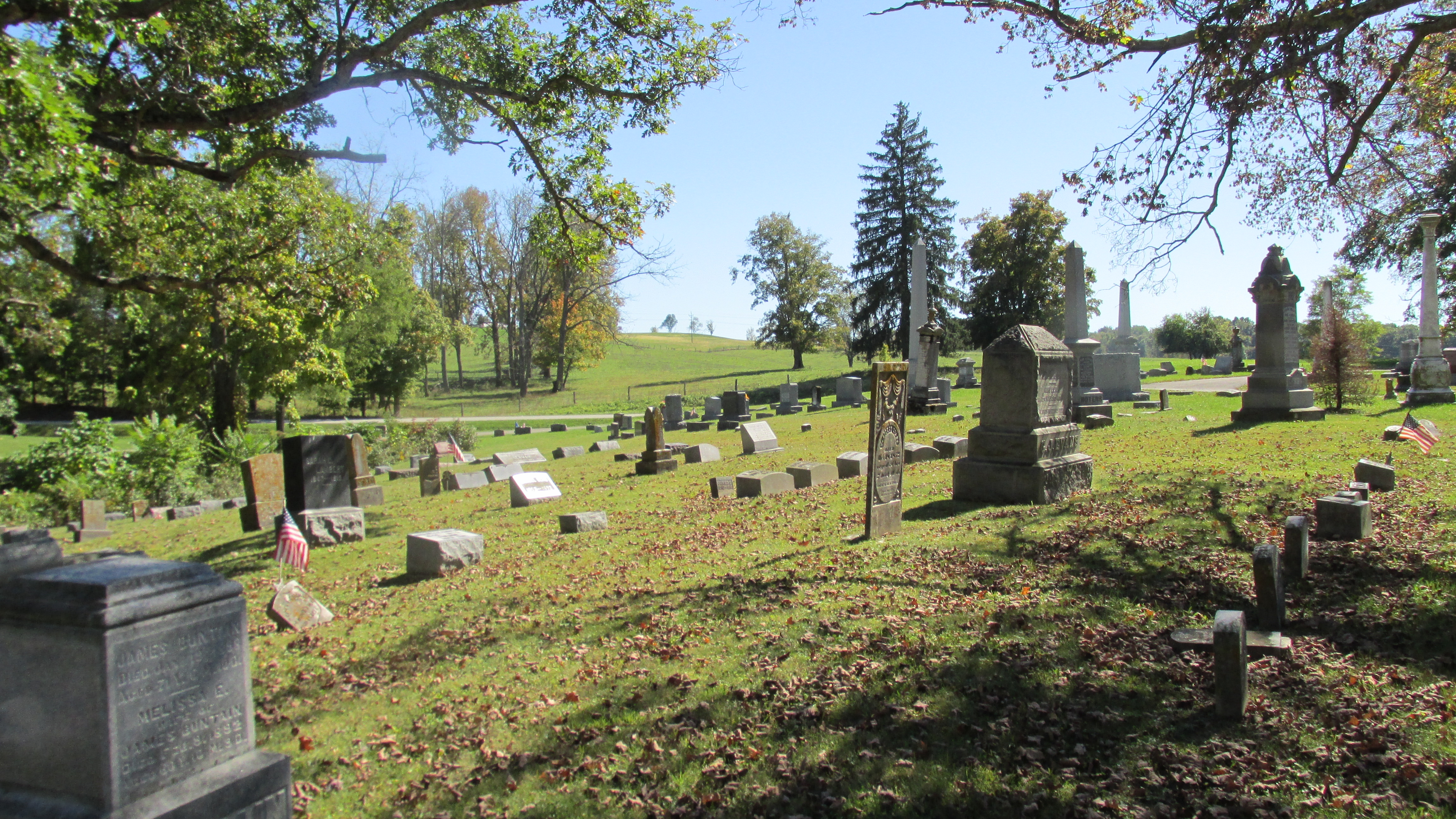
Section B

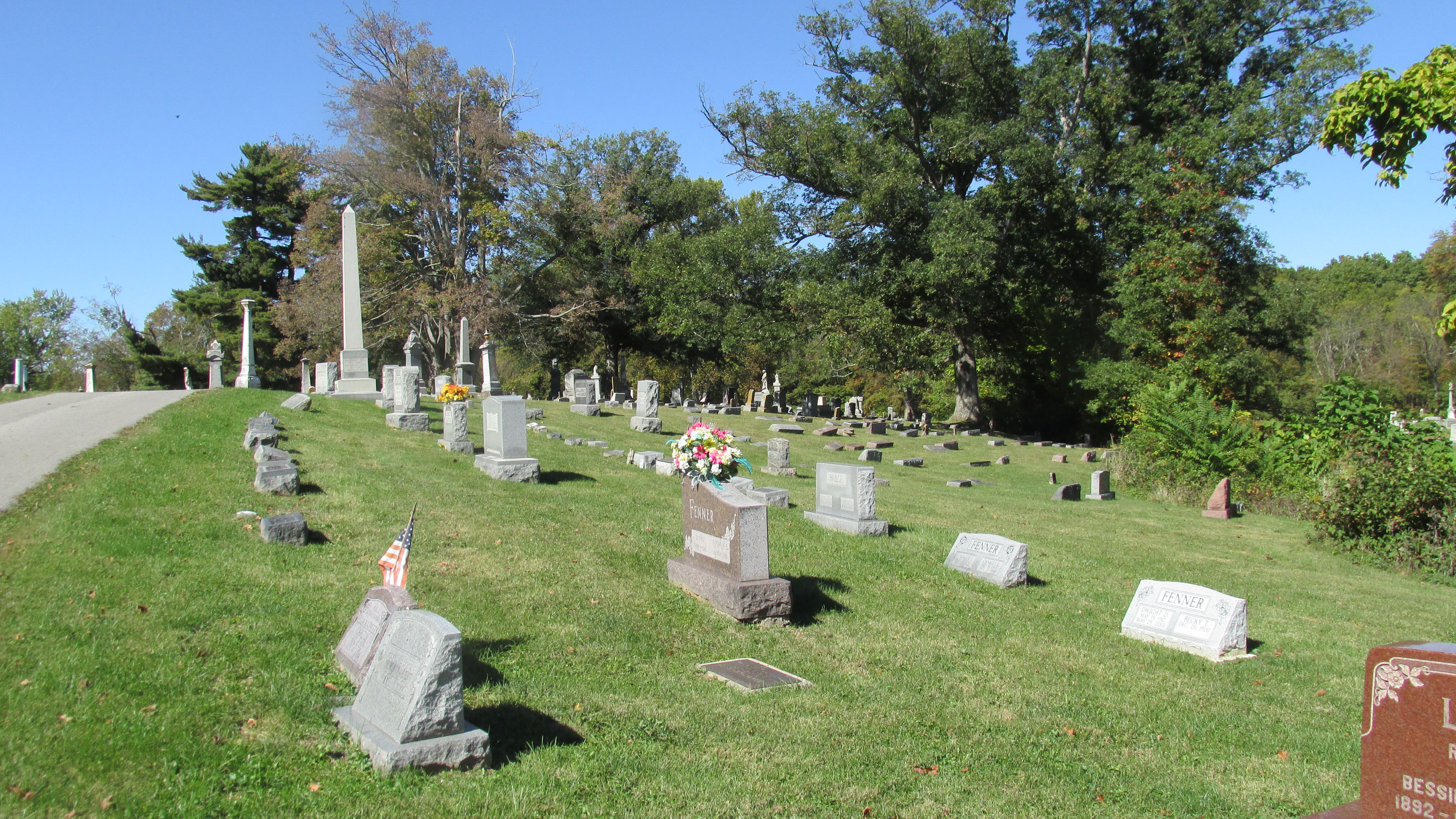
Section B

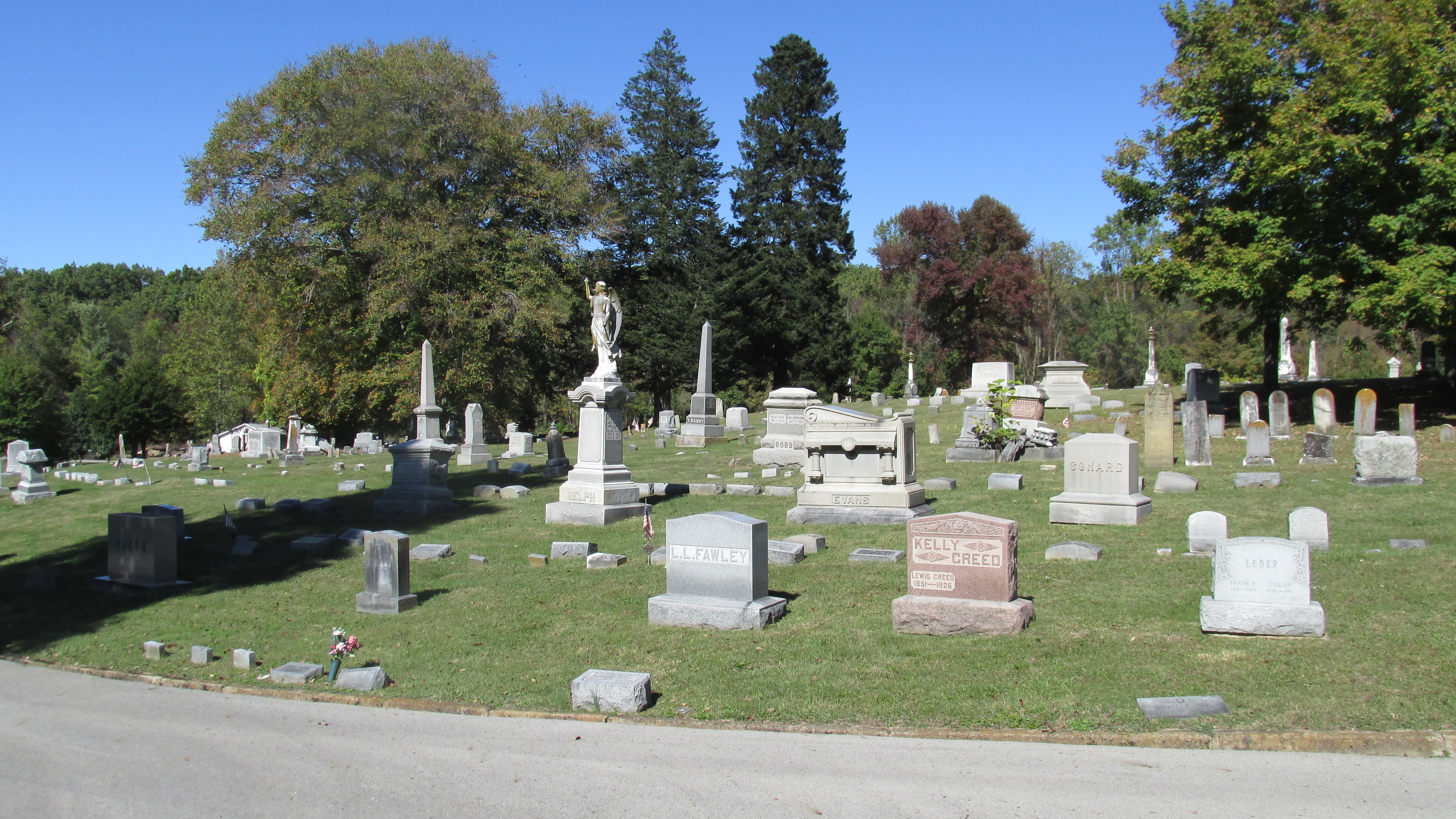
Section C

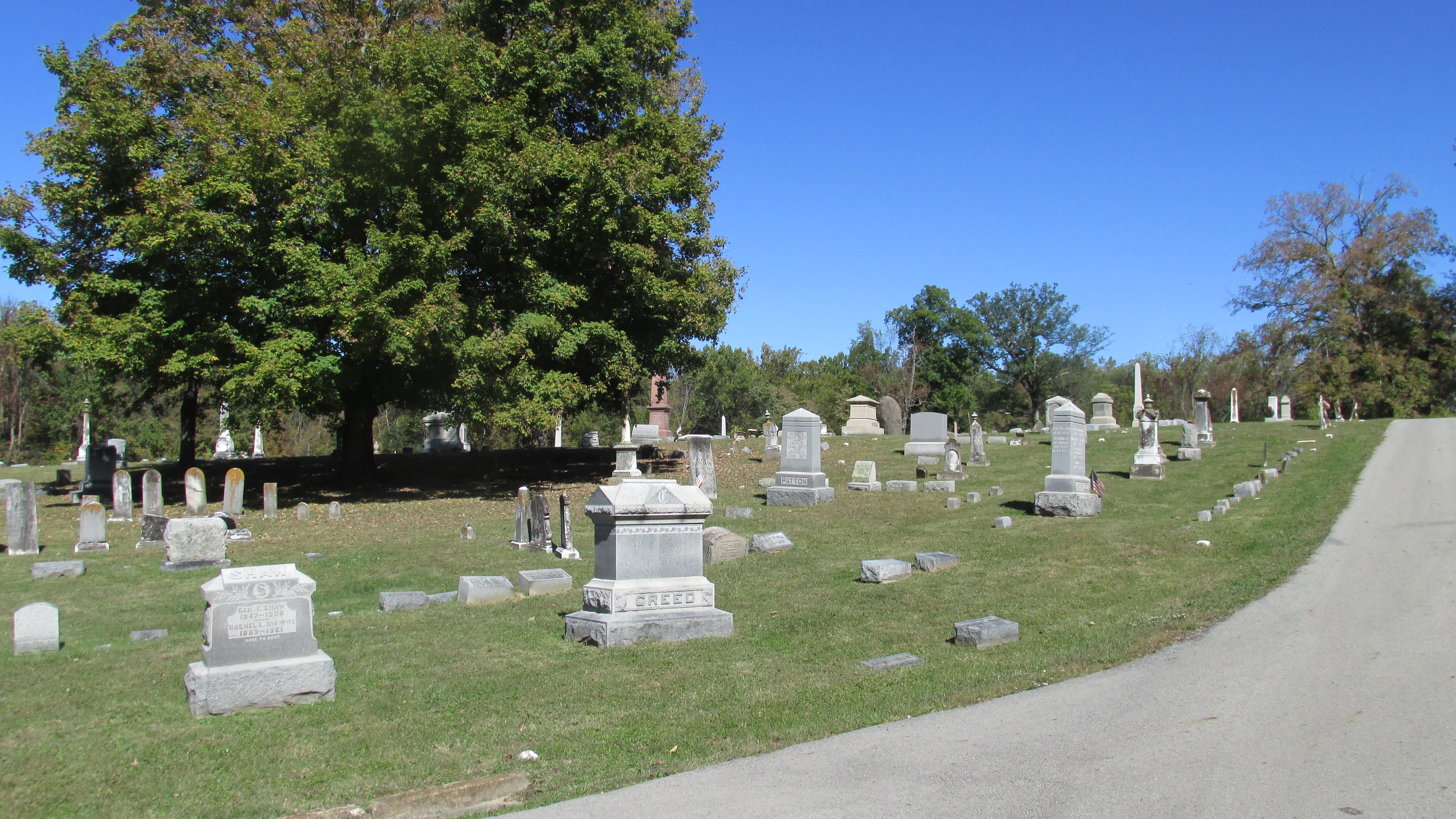
Section C

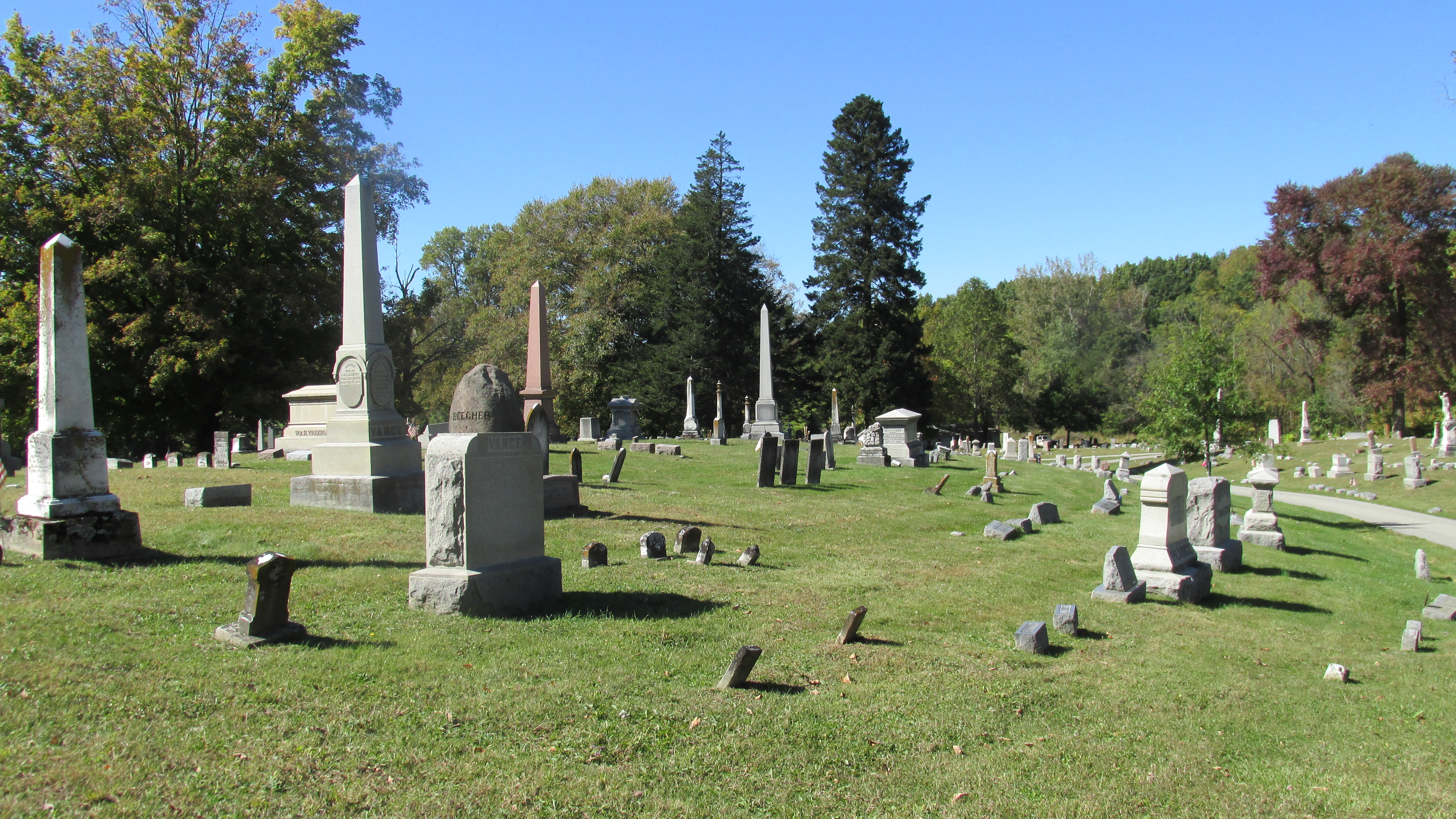
Section C

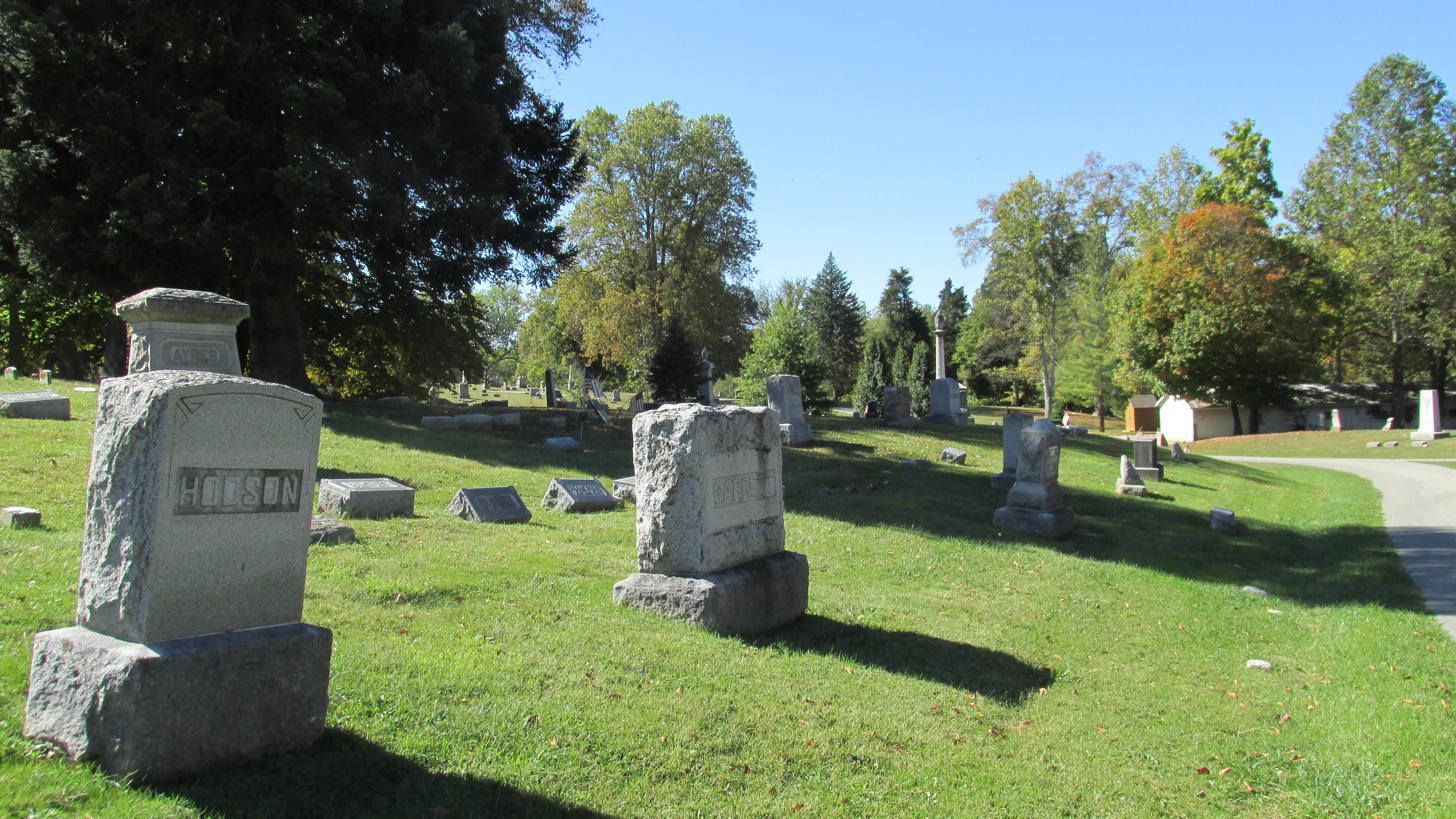
Section C

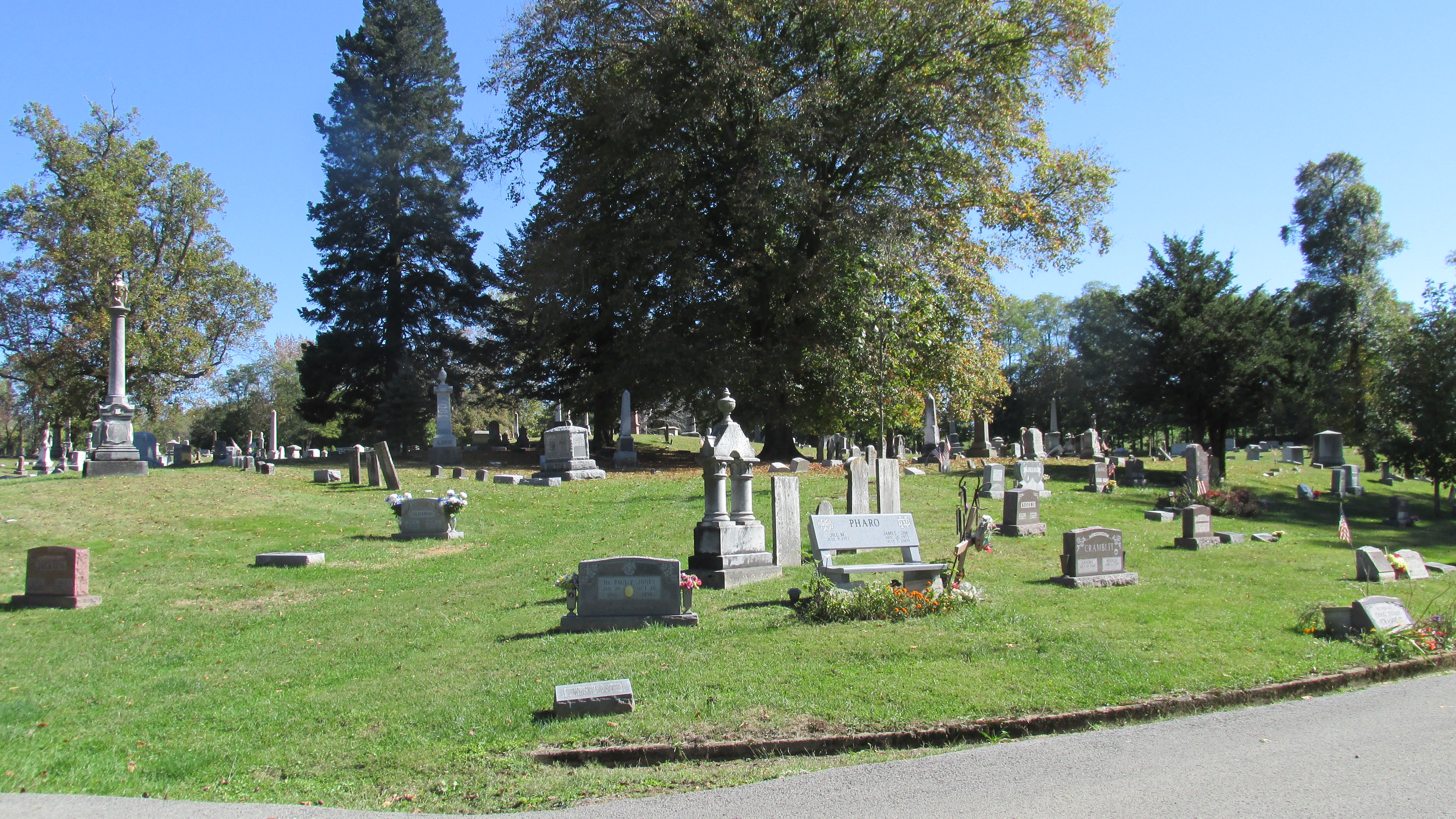
Section C

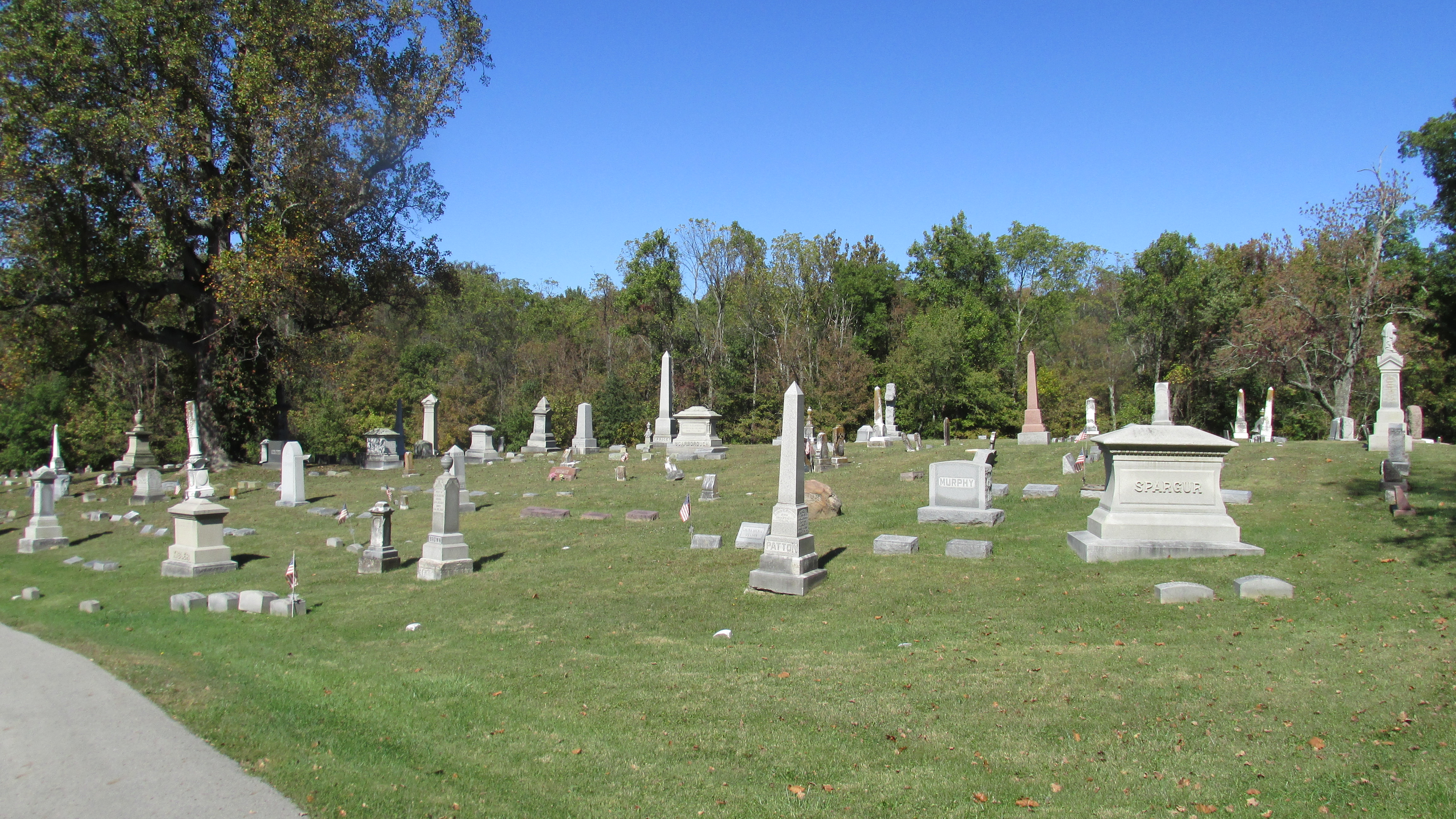
Section D

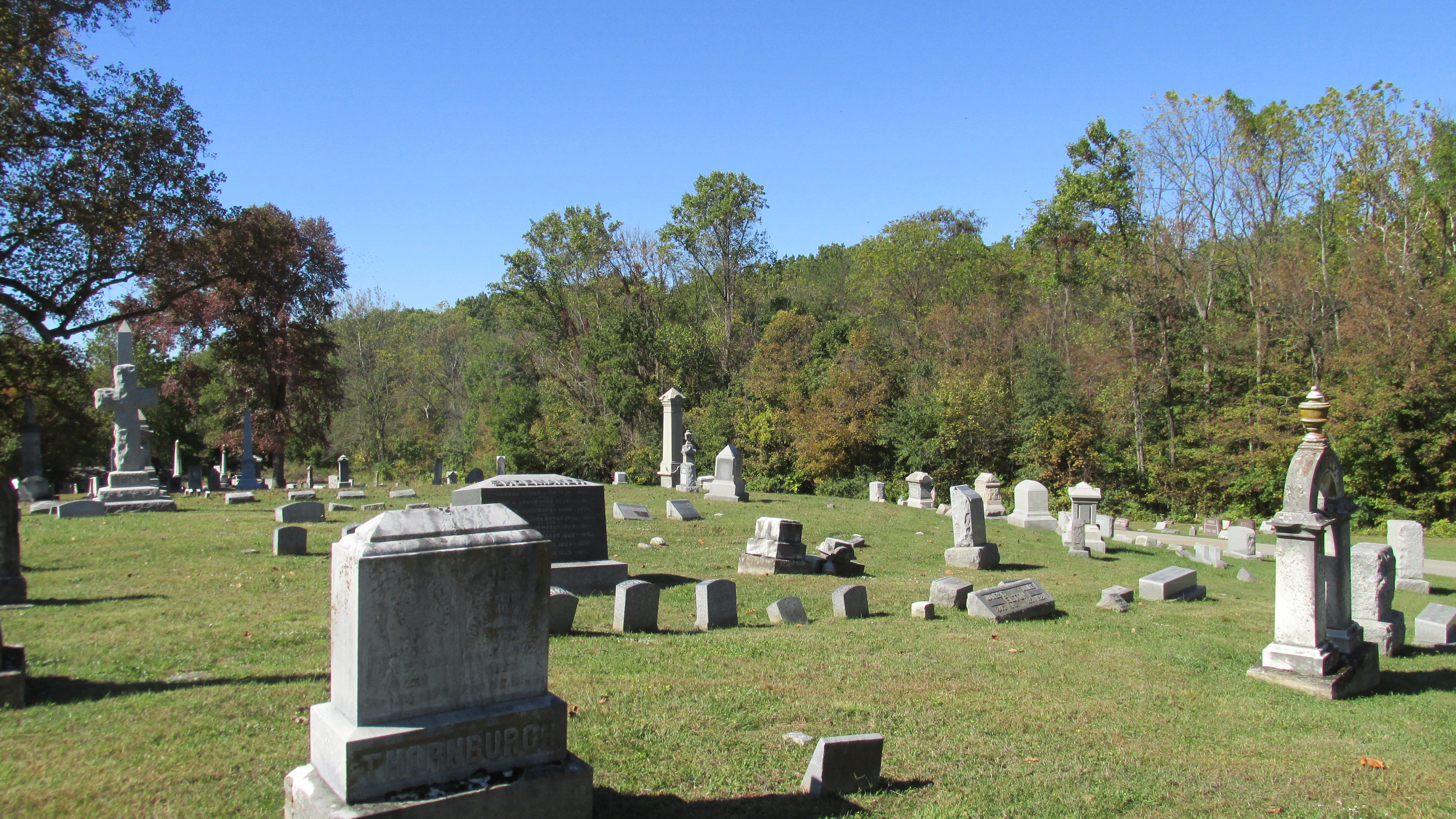
Section D

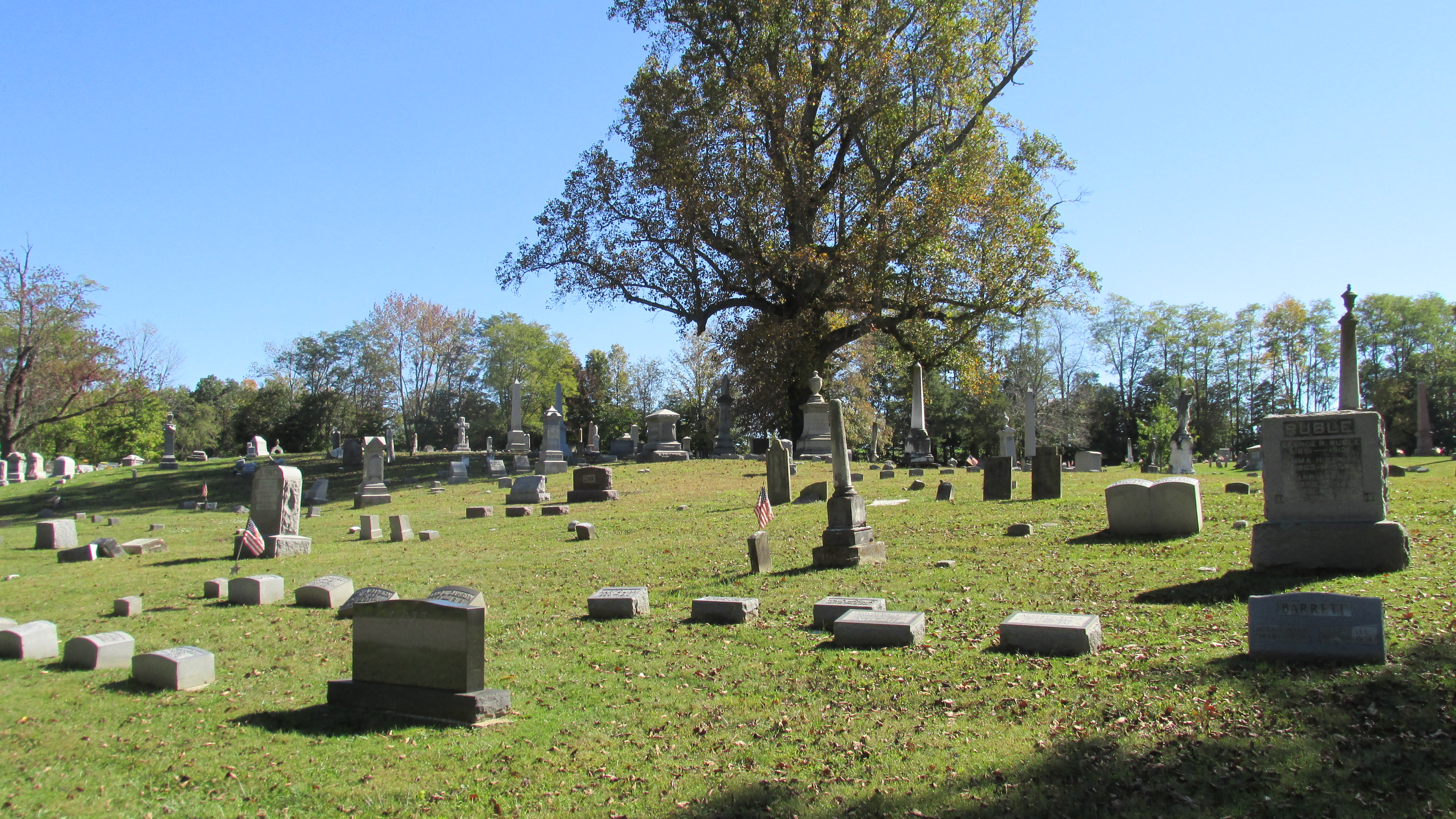
Section D

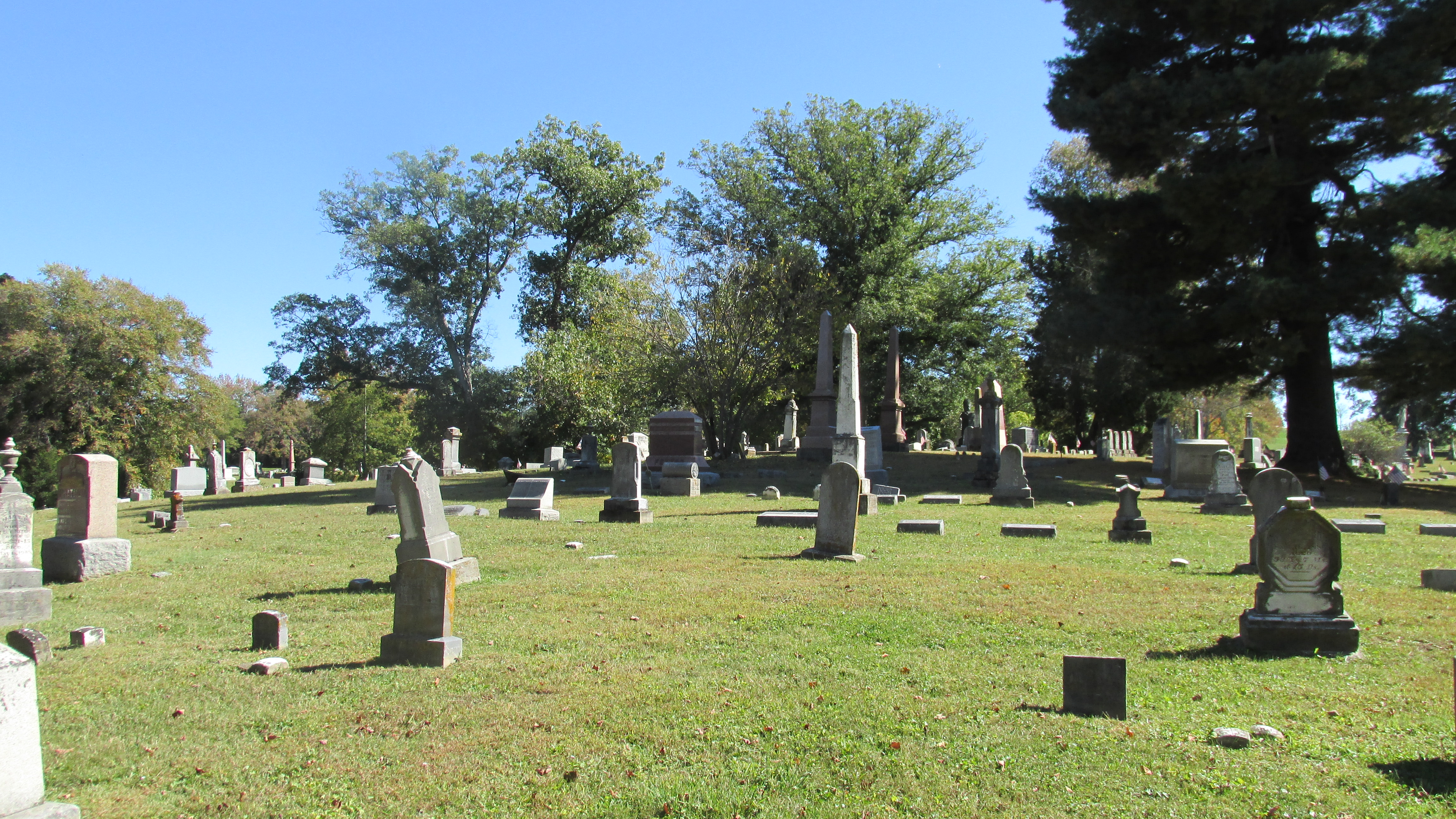
Section E

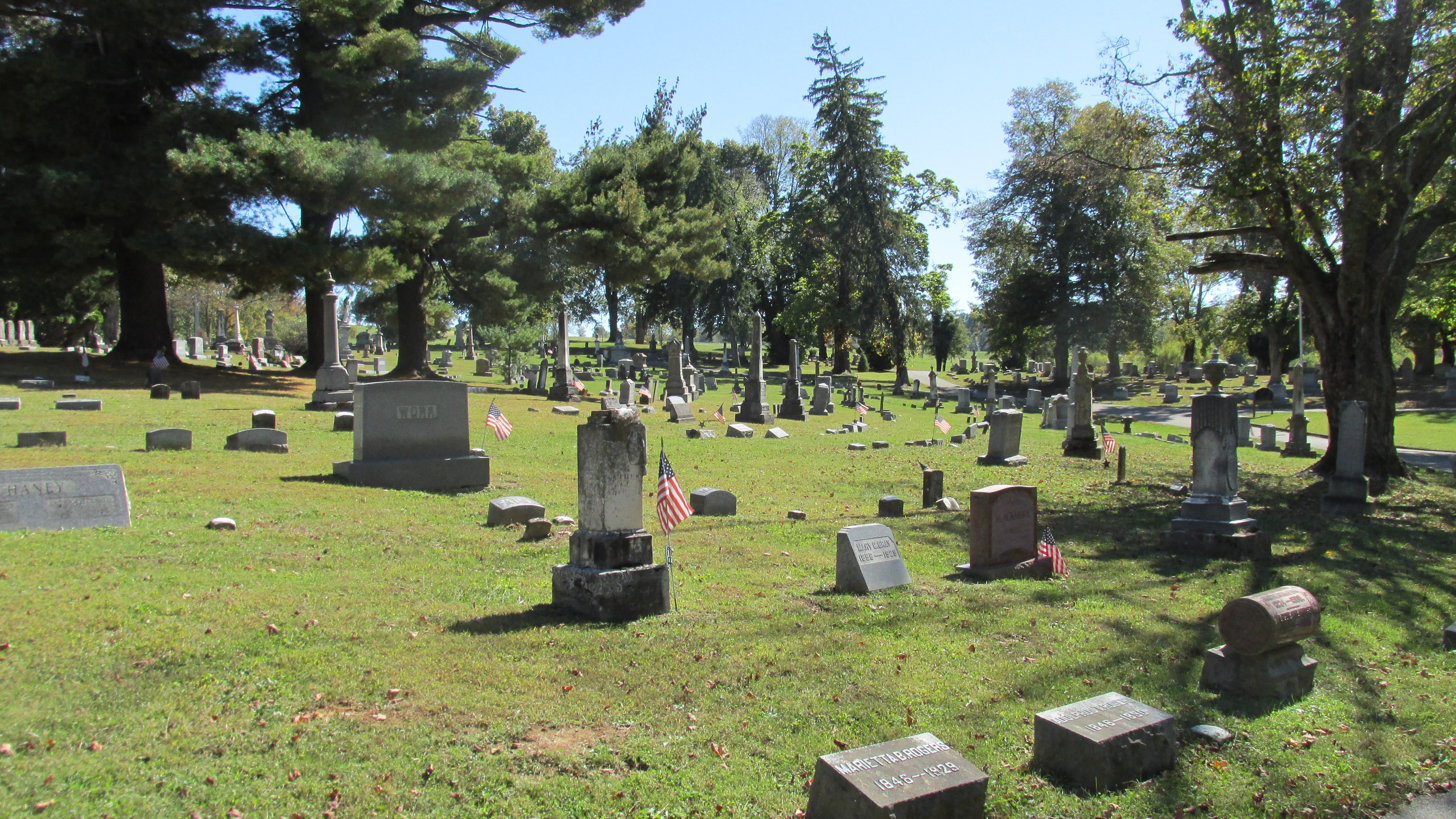
Section E

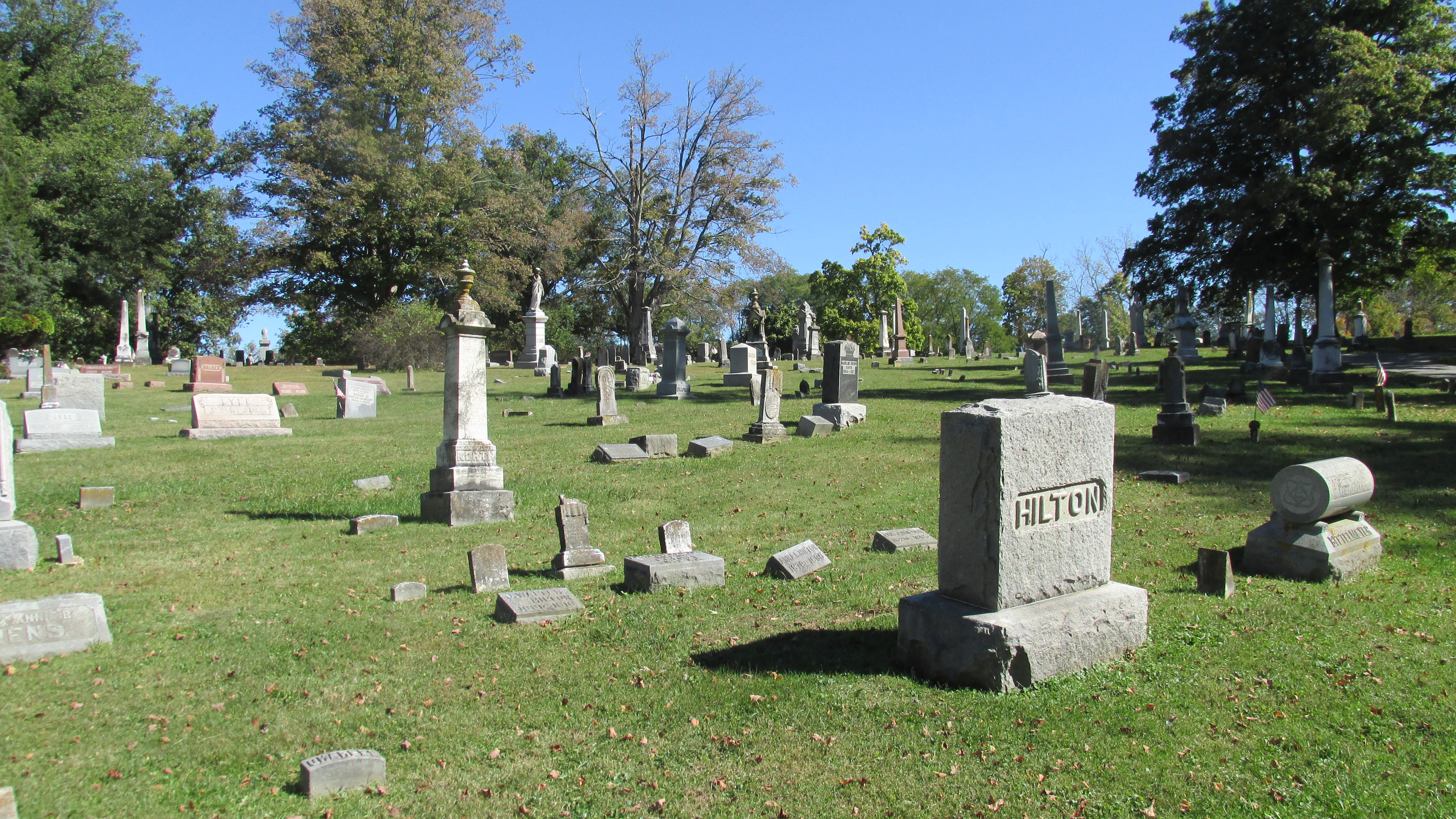
Section E

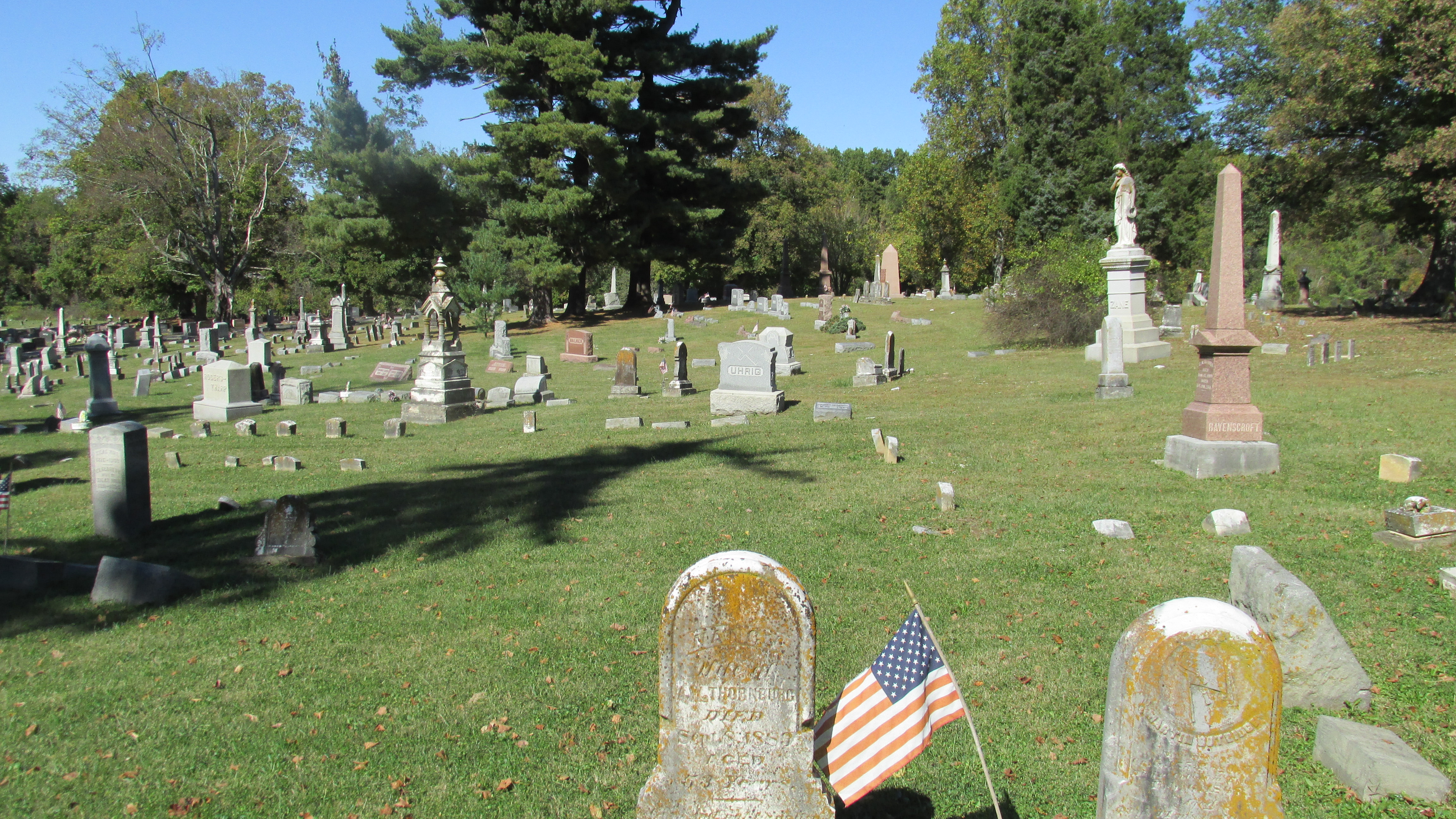
Section E

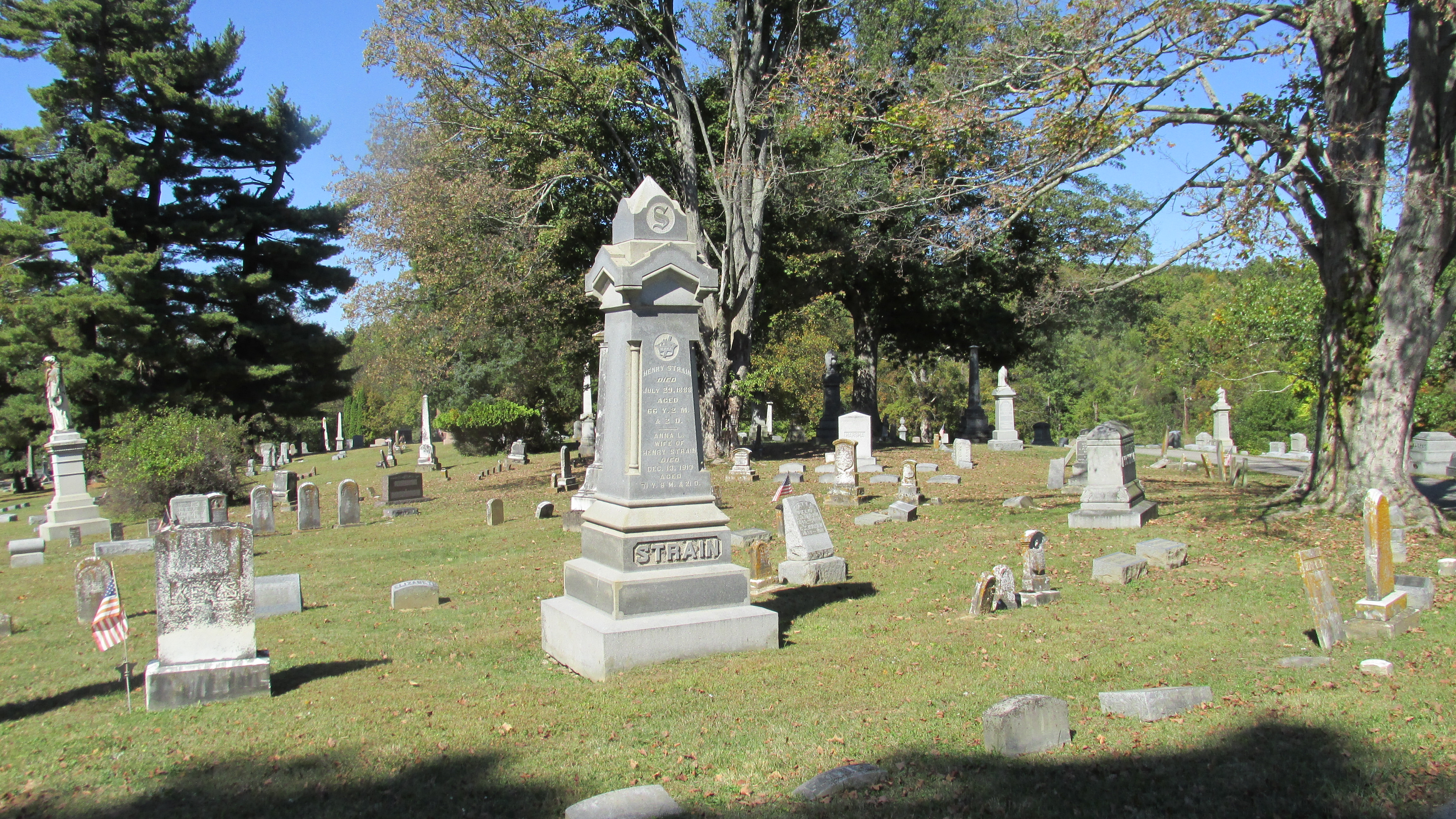
Section E

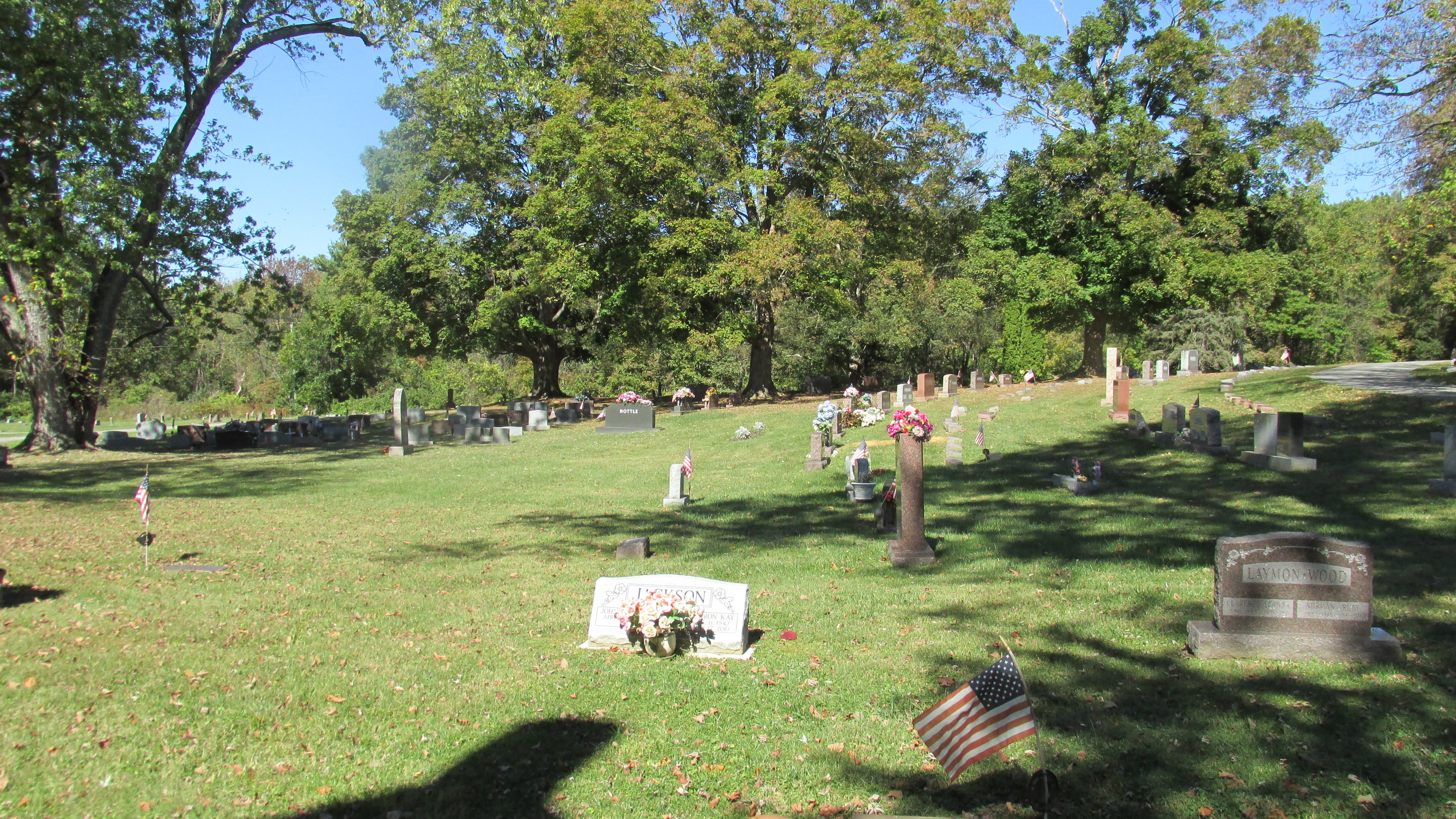
Section F

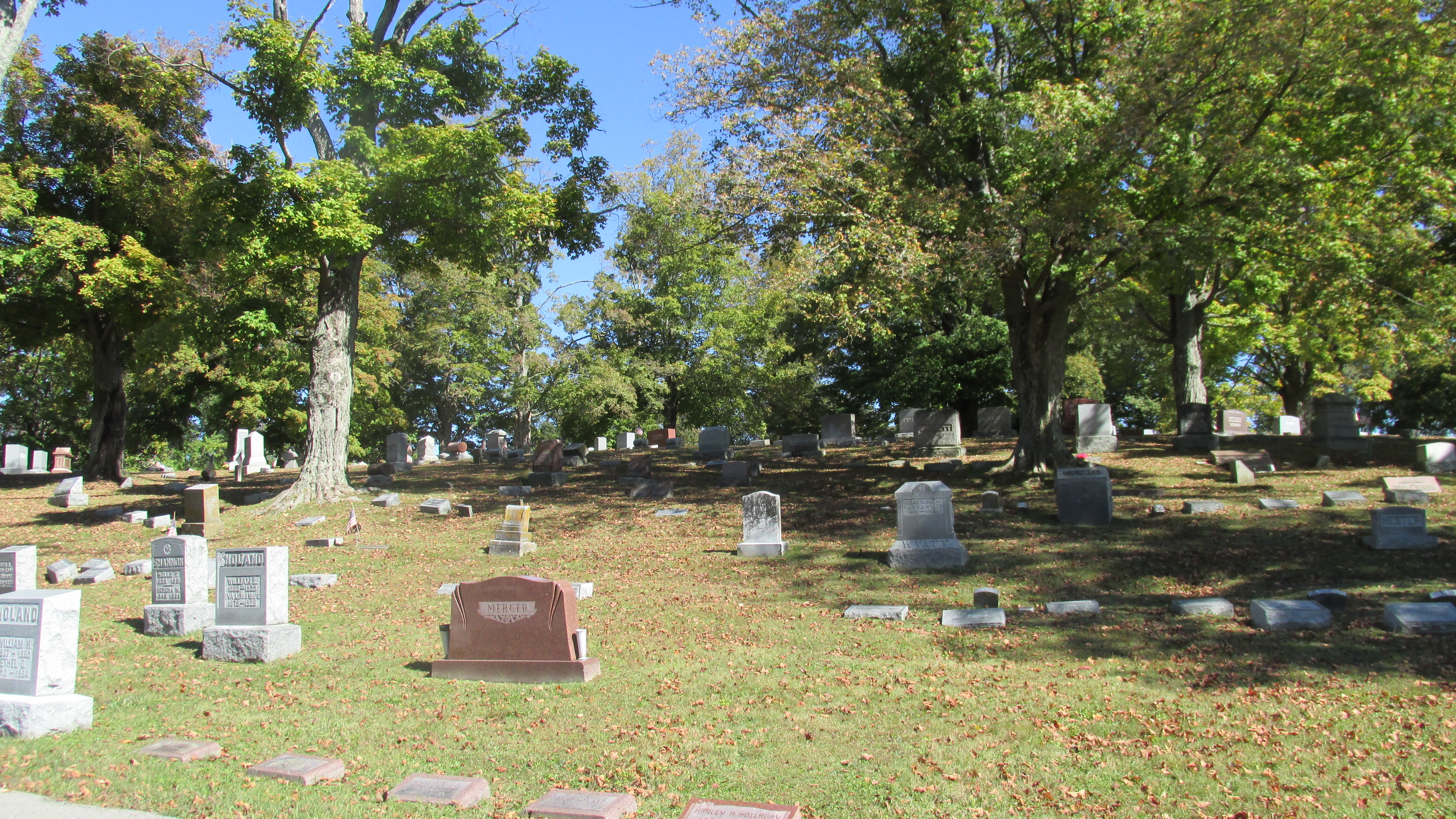
Section G

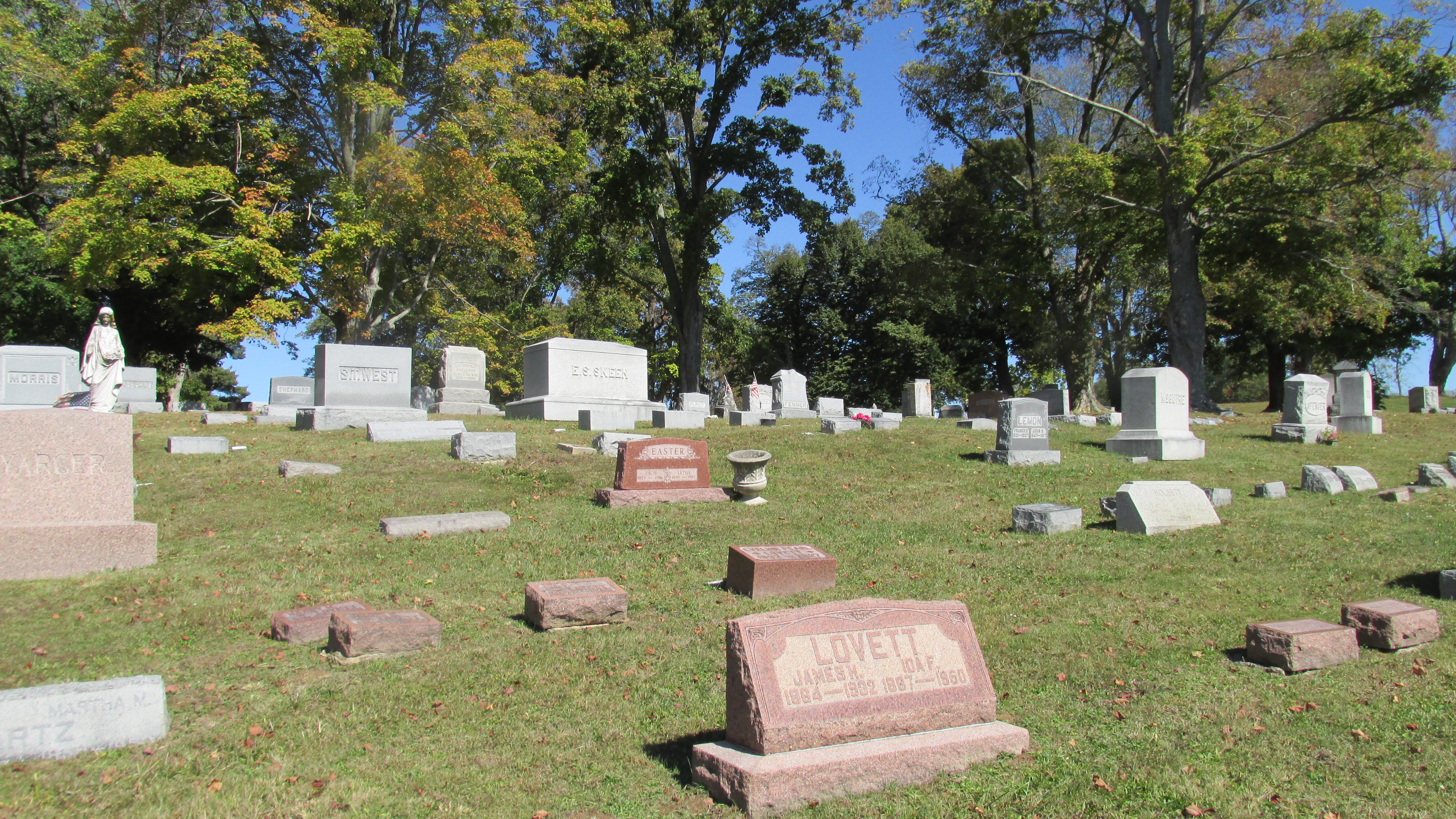
Section G

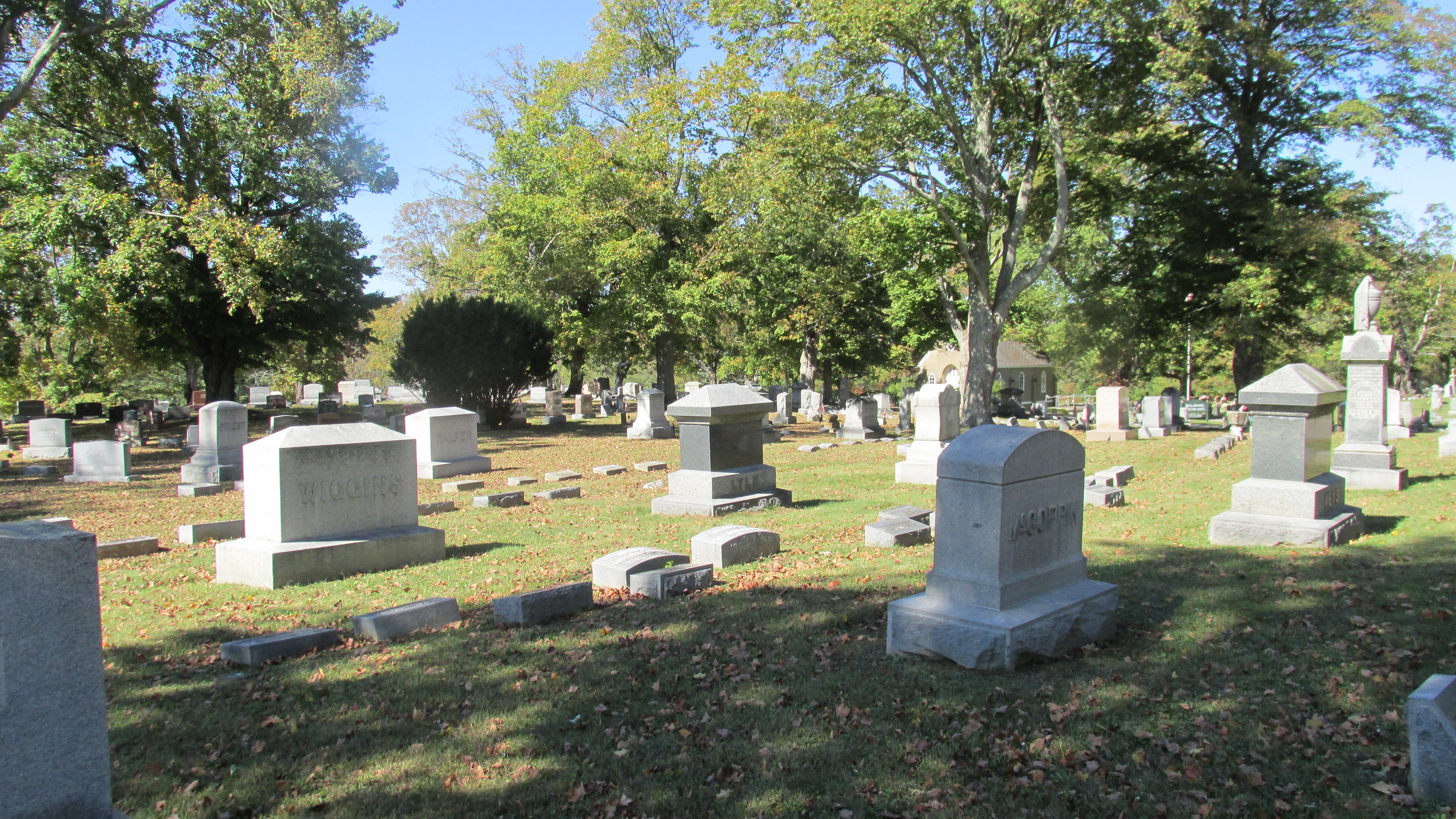
Section G

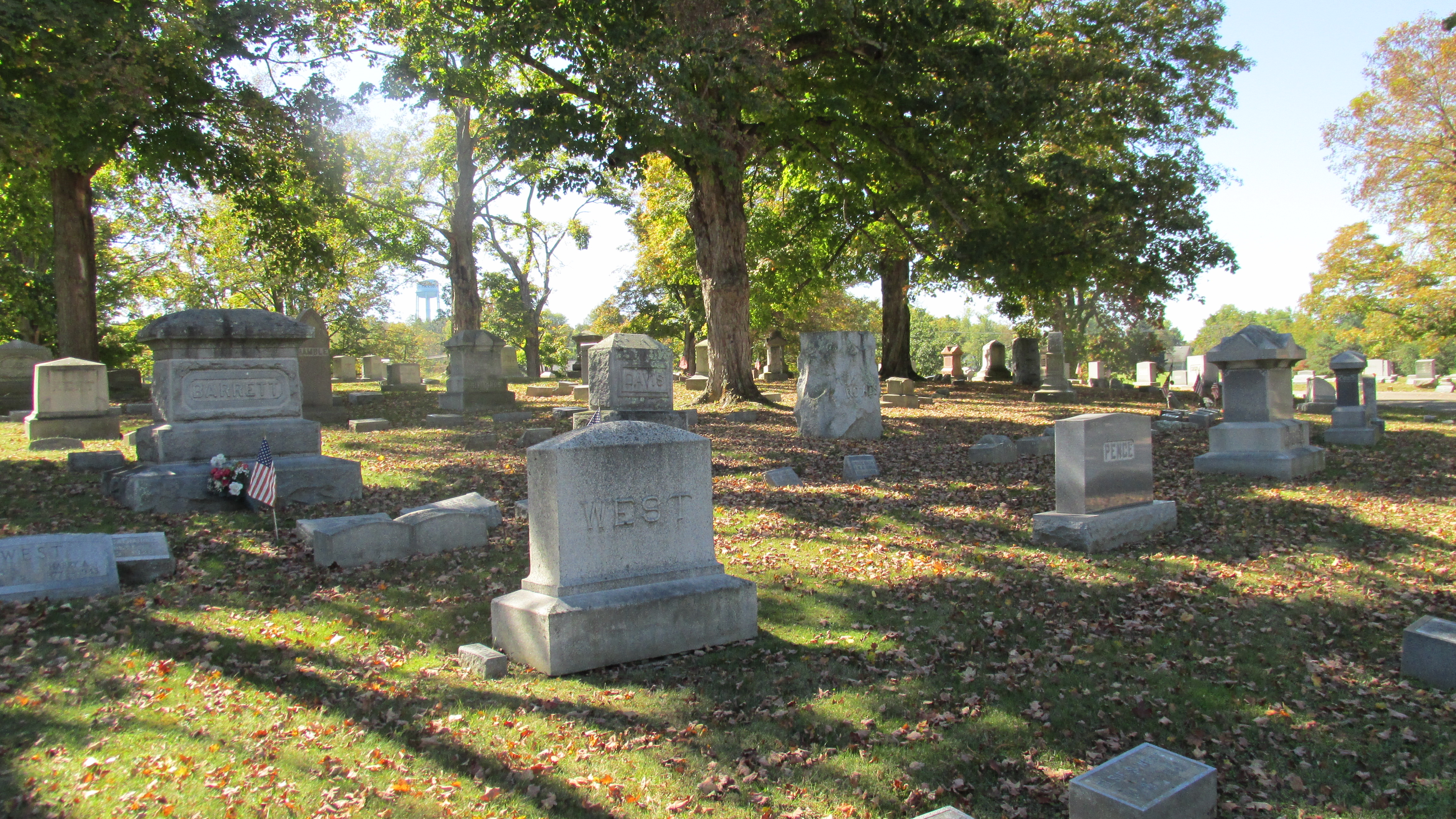
Section G

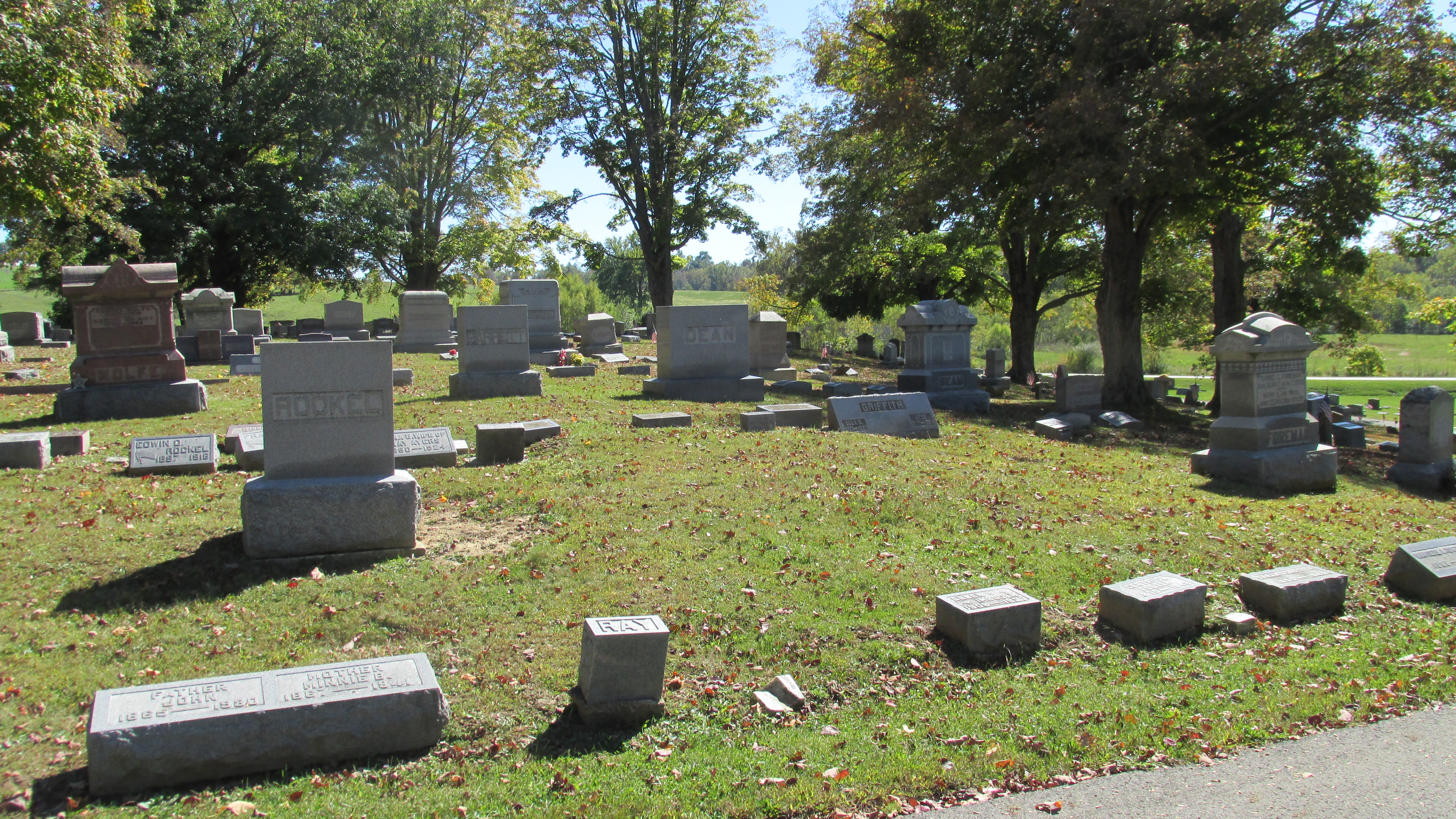
Section G

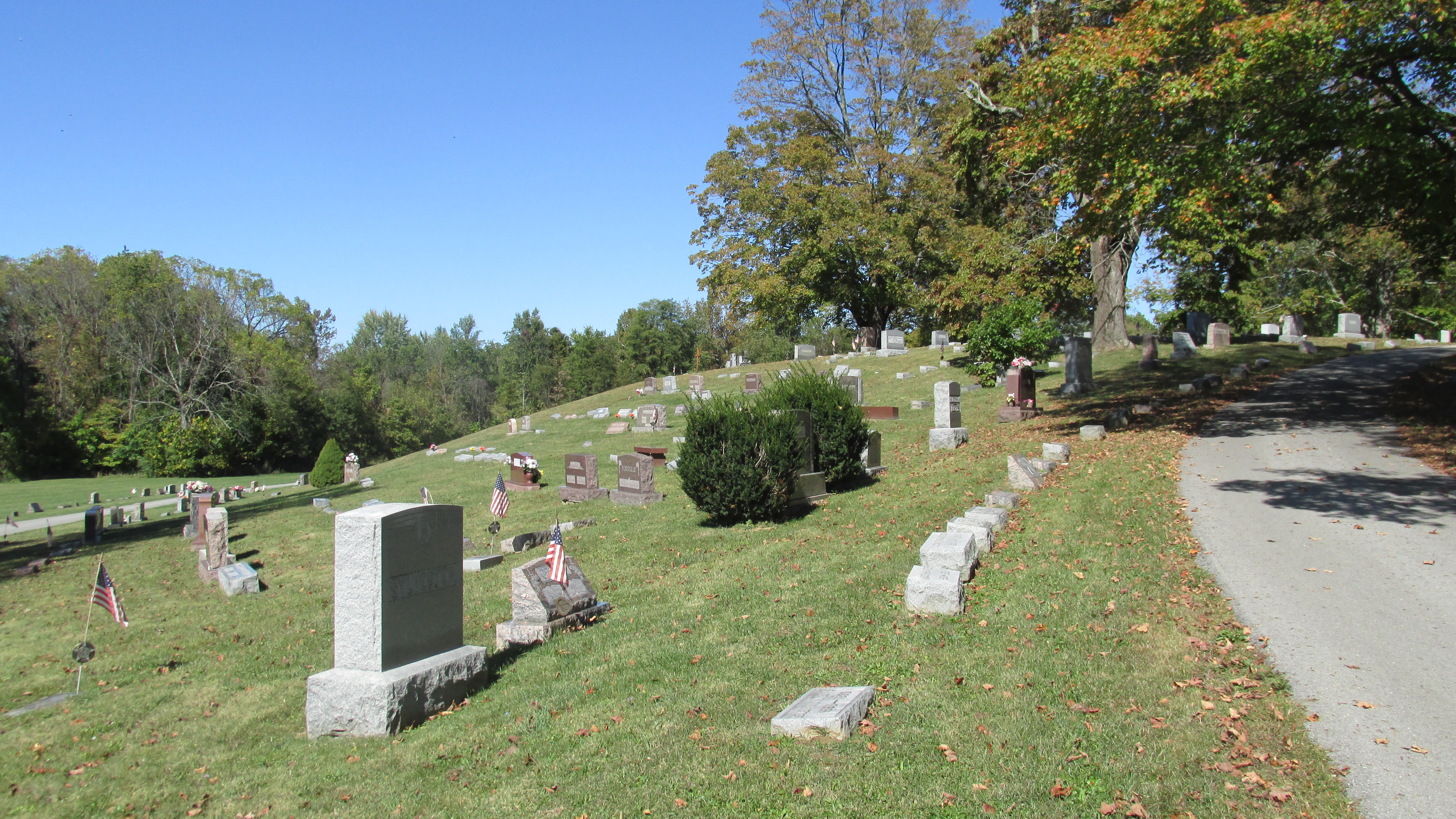
Section H

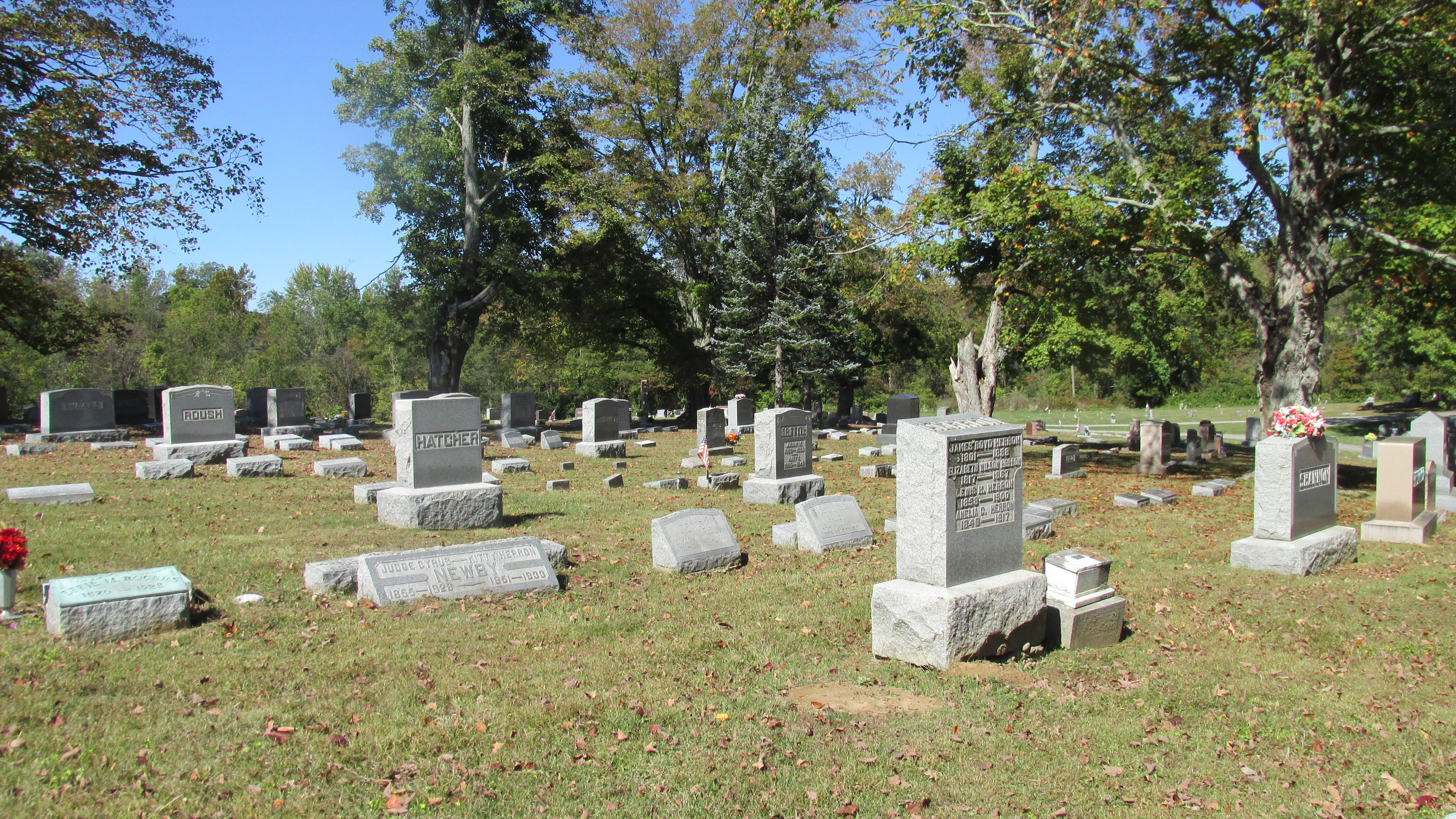
Section H

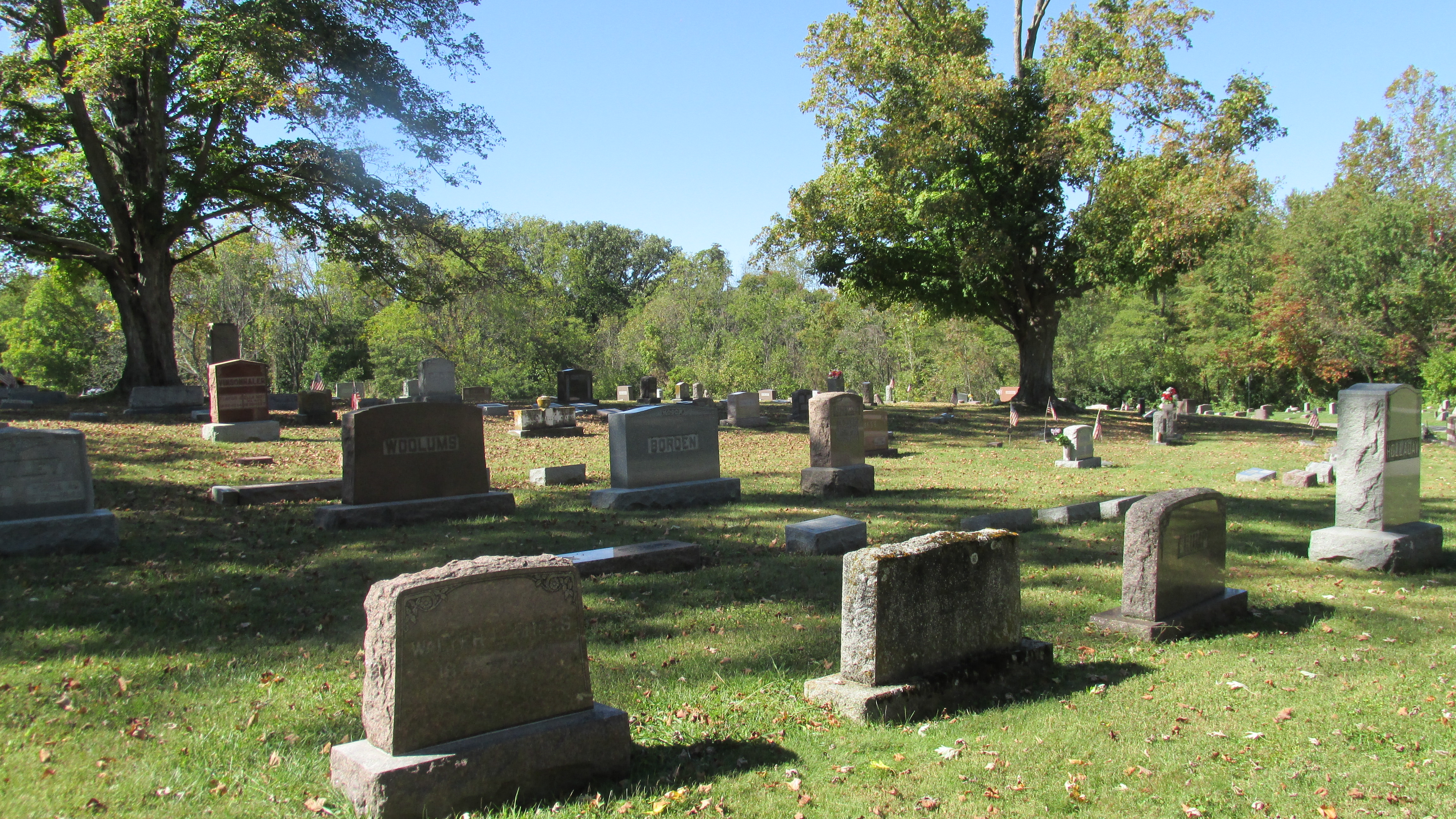
Section H

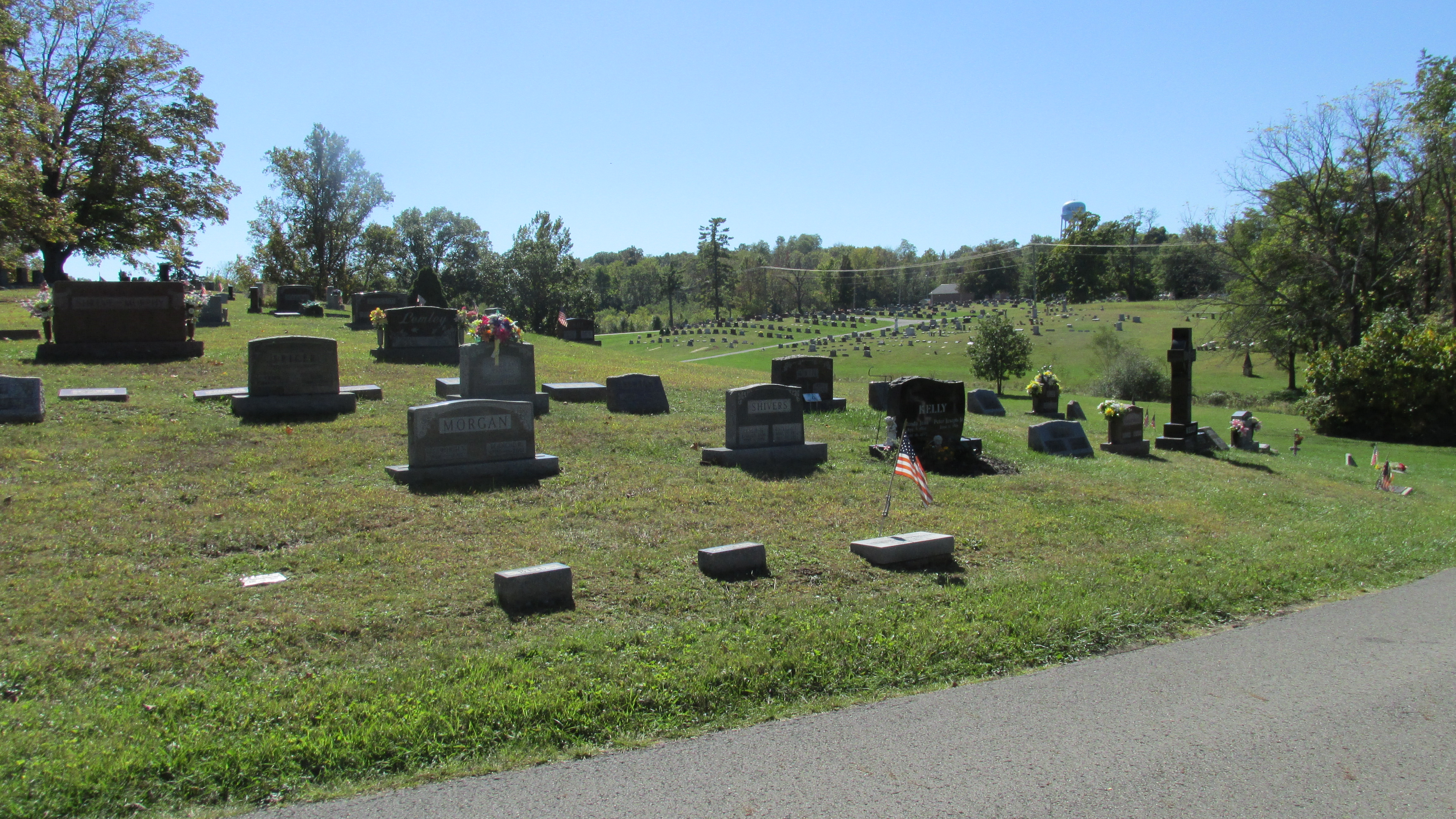
Section H

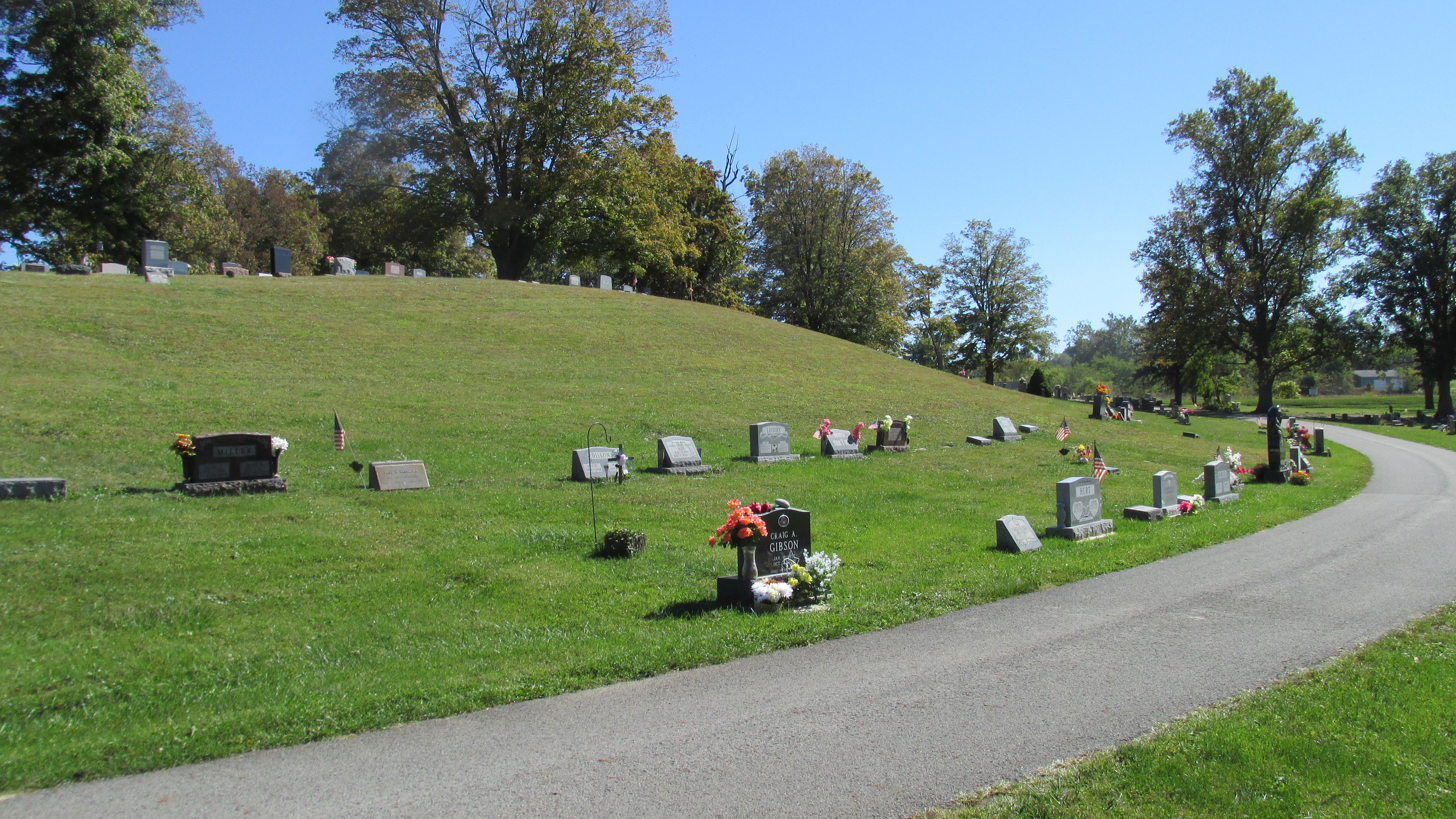
Section H

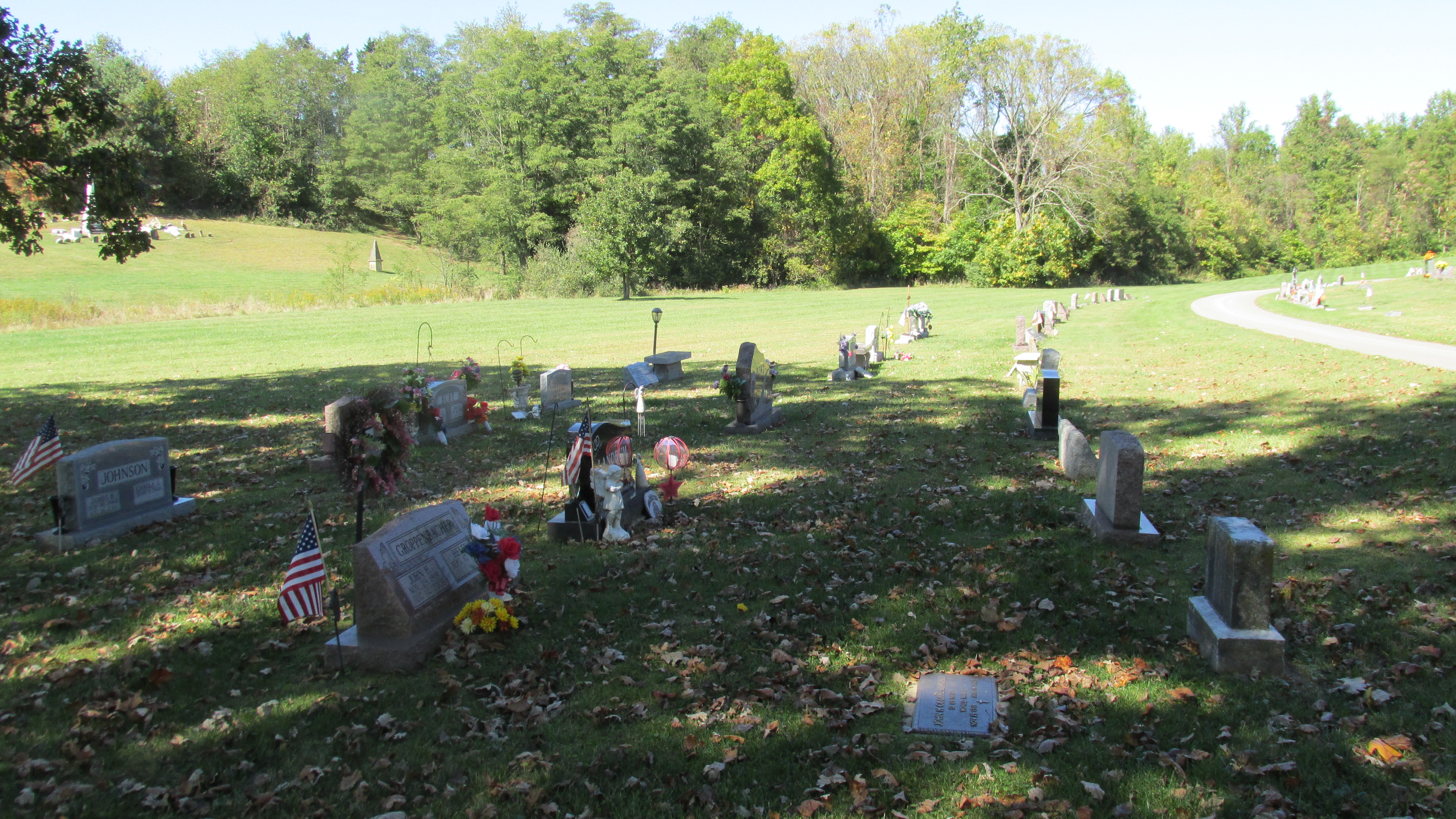
Section I

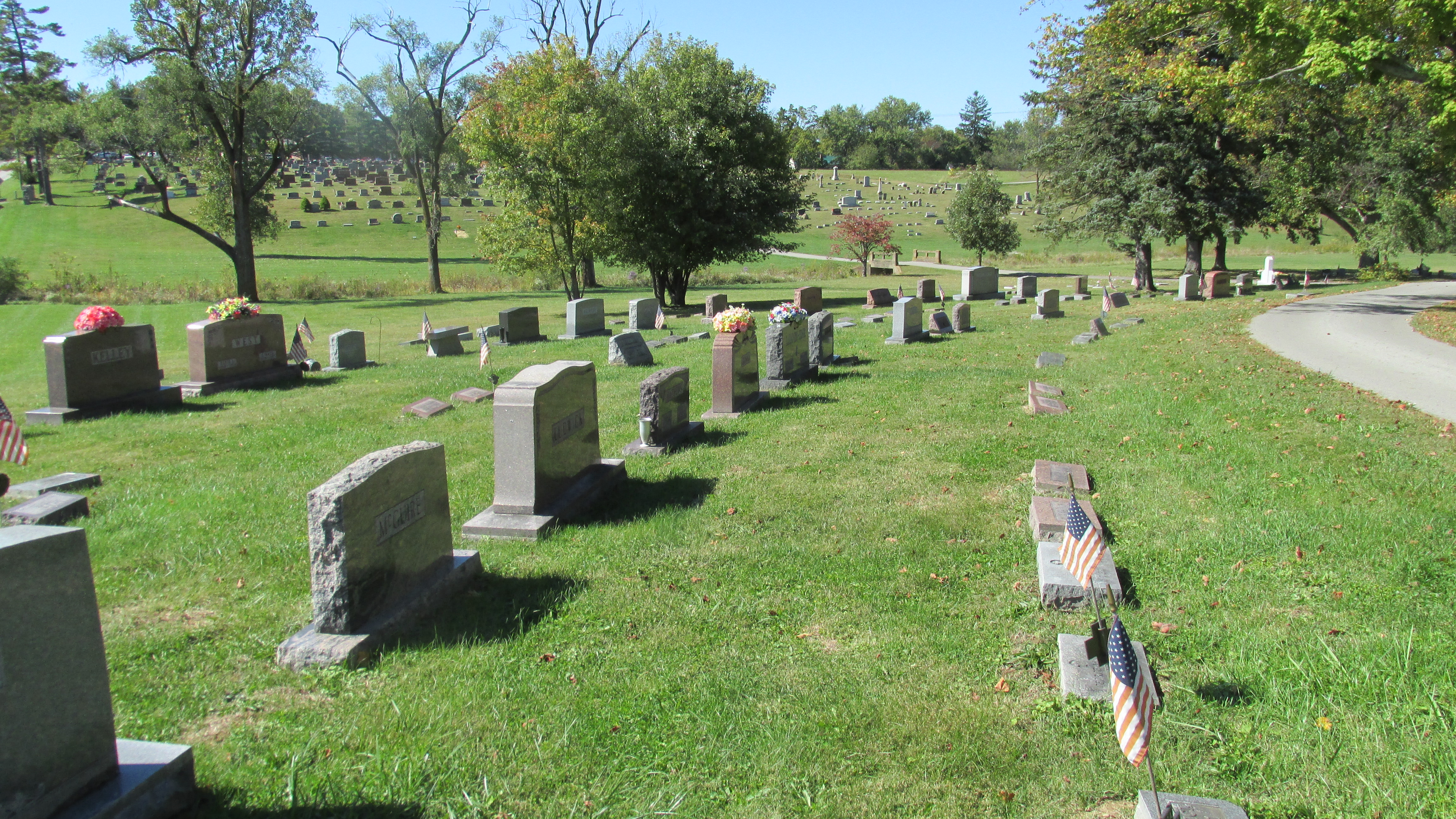
Section J

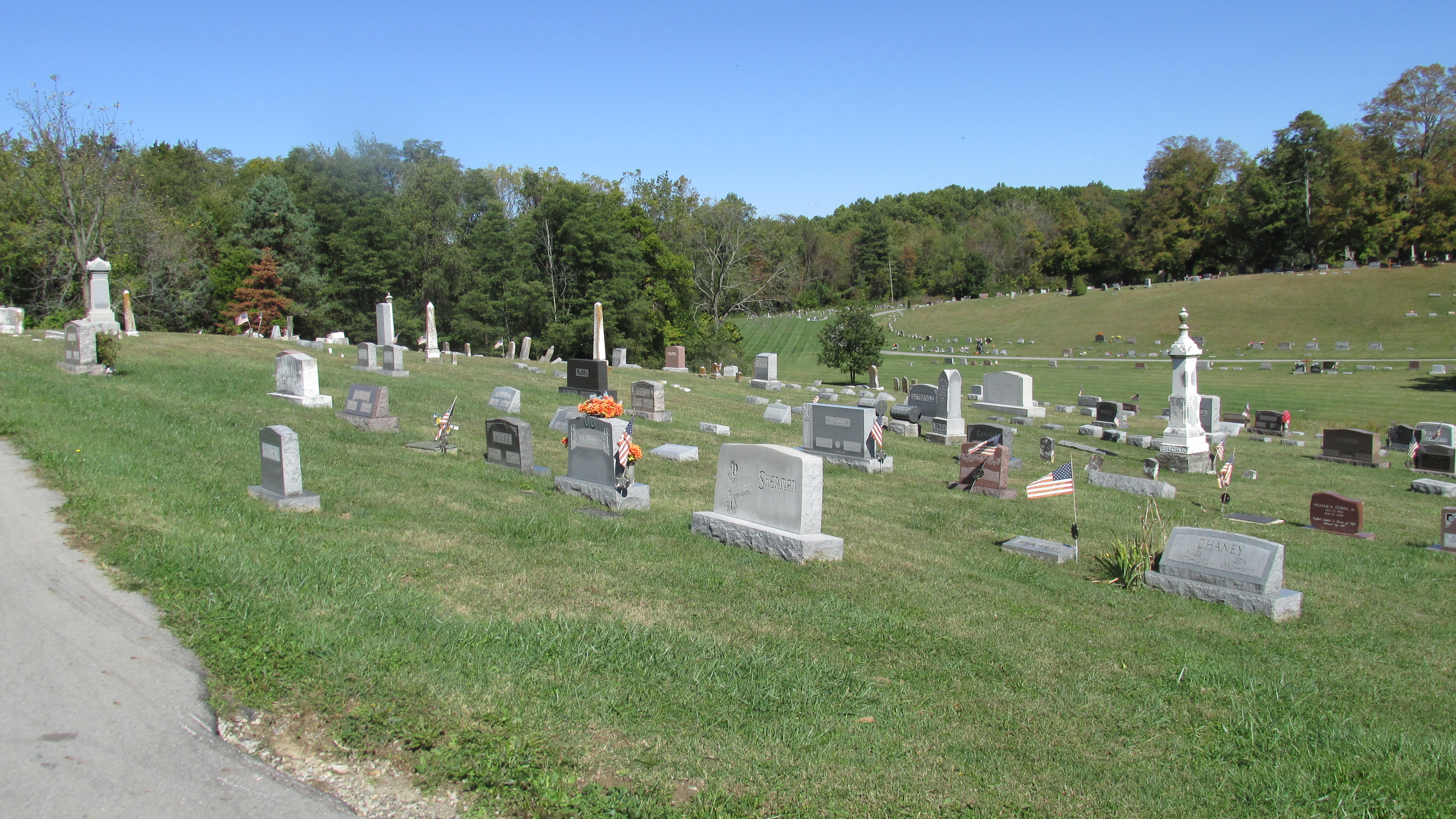
Section K

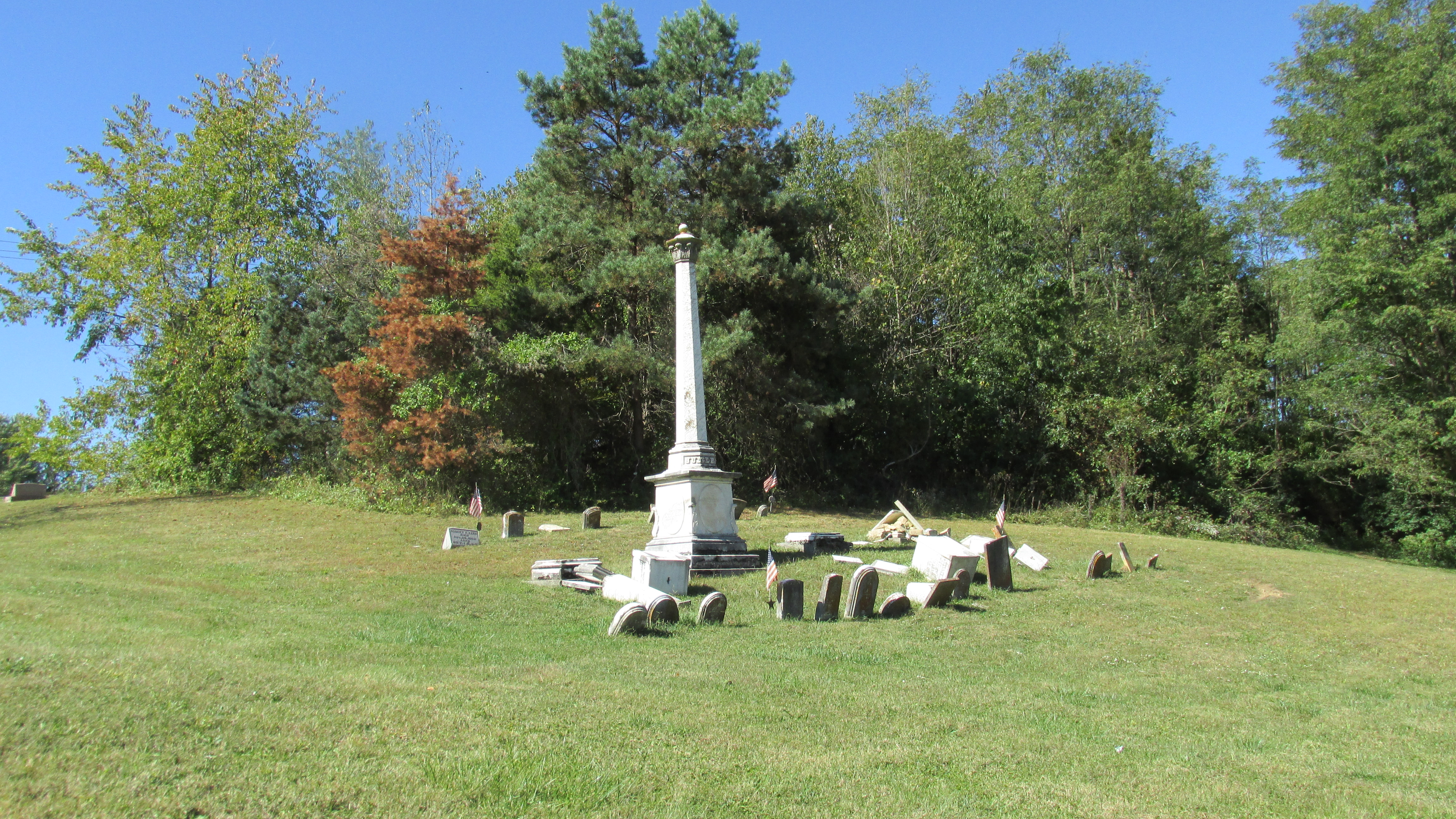
Section L

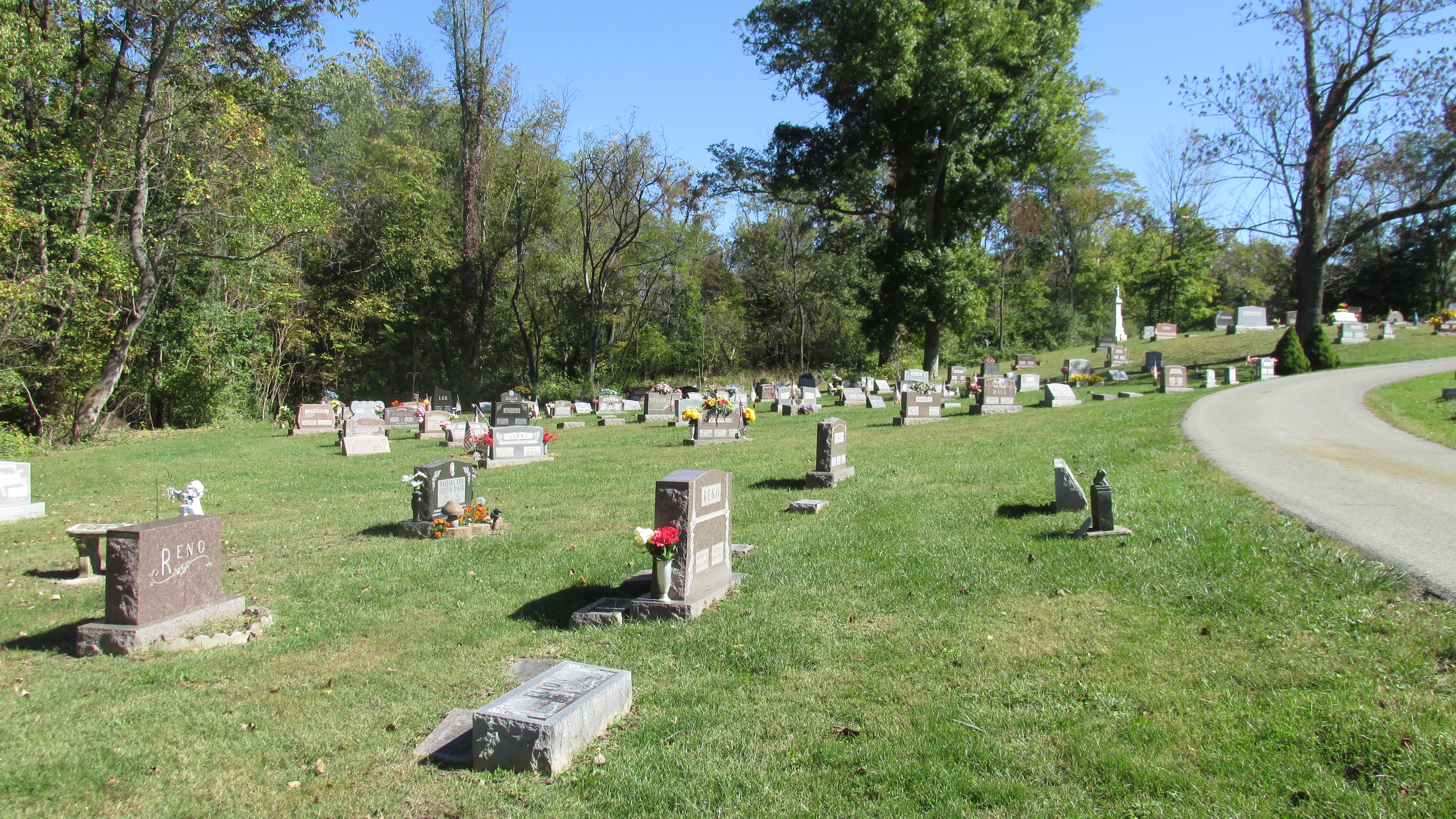
Section M

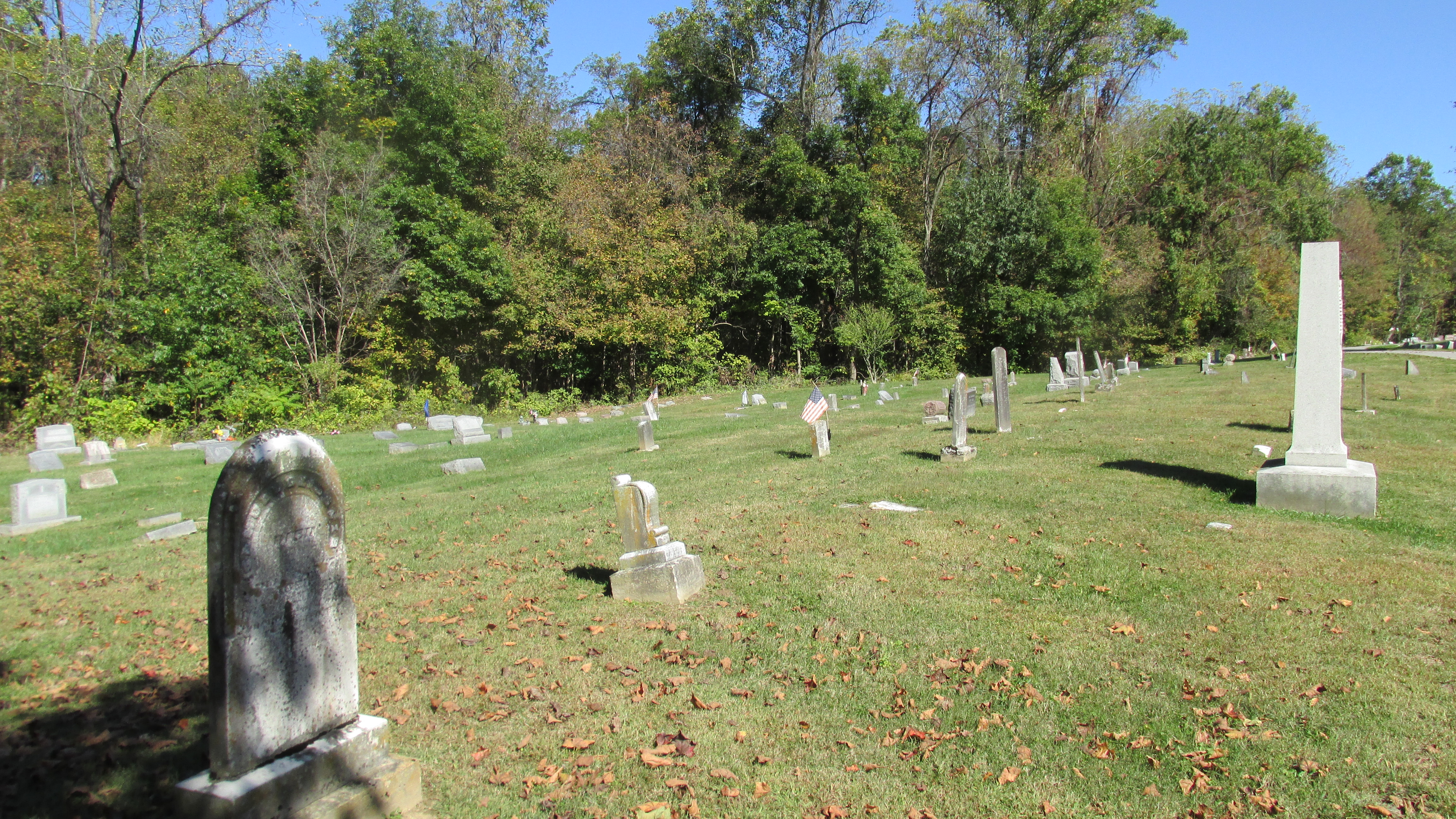
Section M

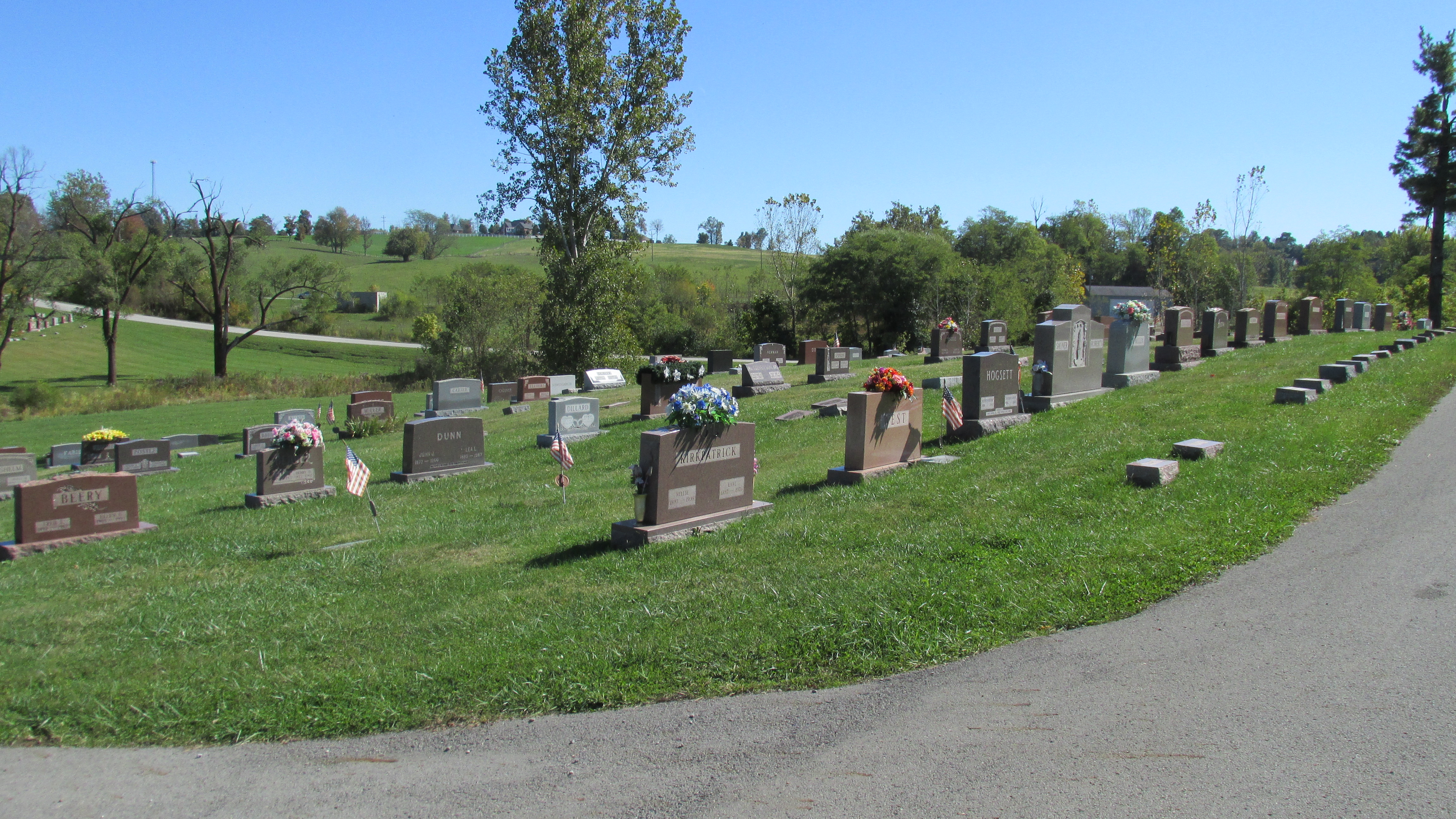
Section N

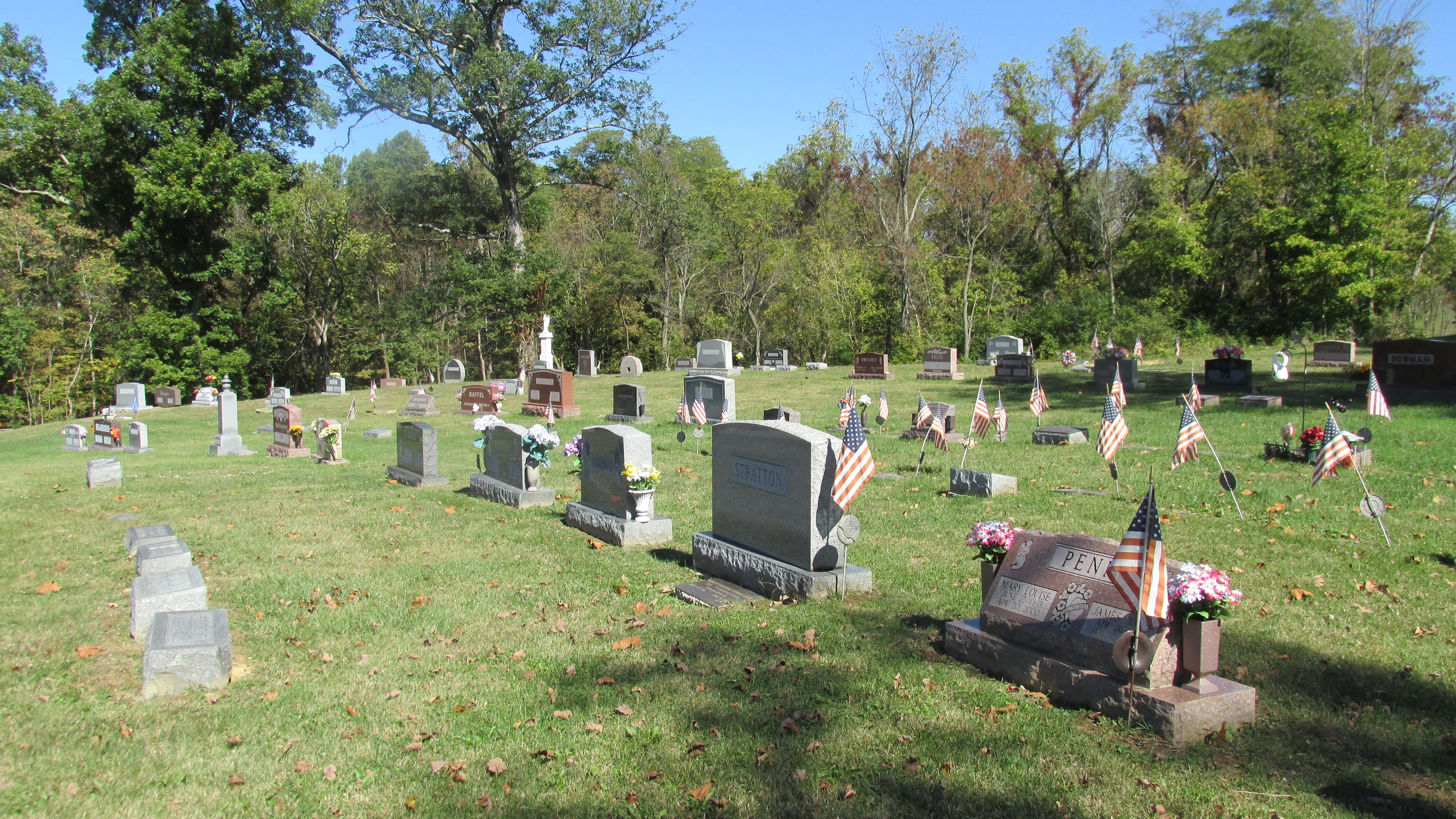
Section O

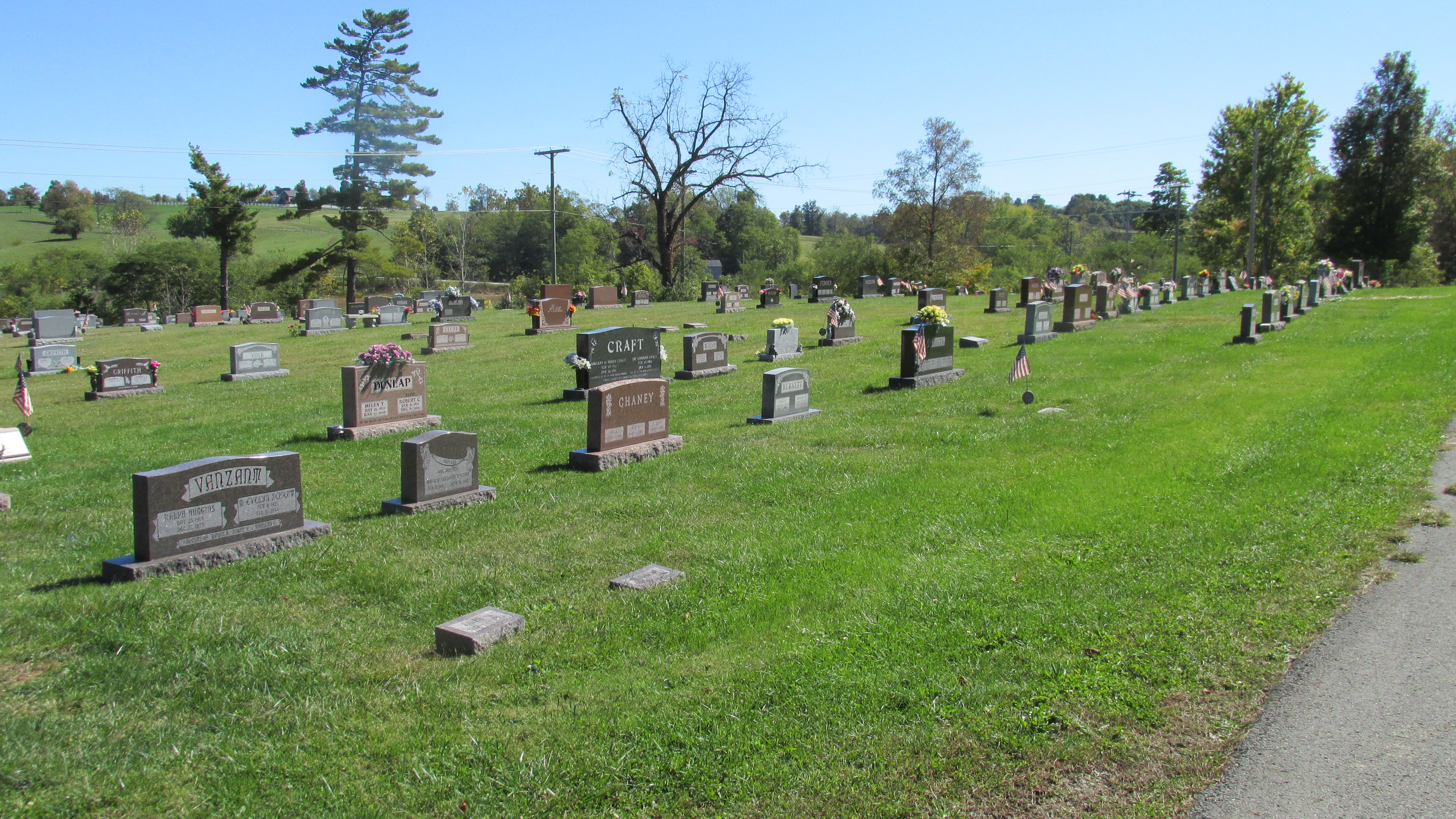
Section P

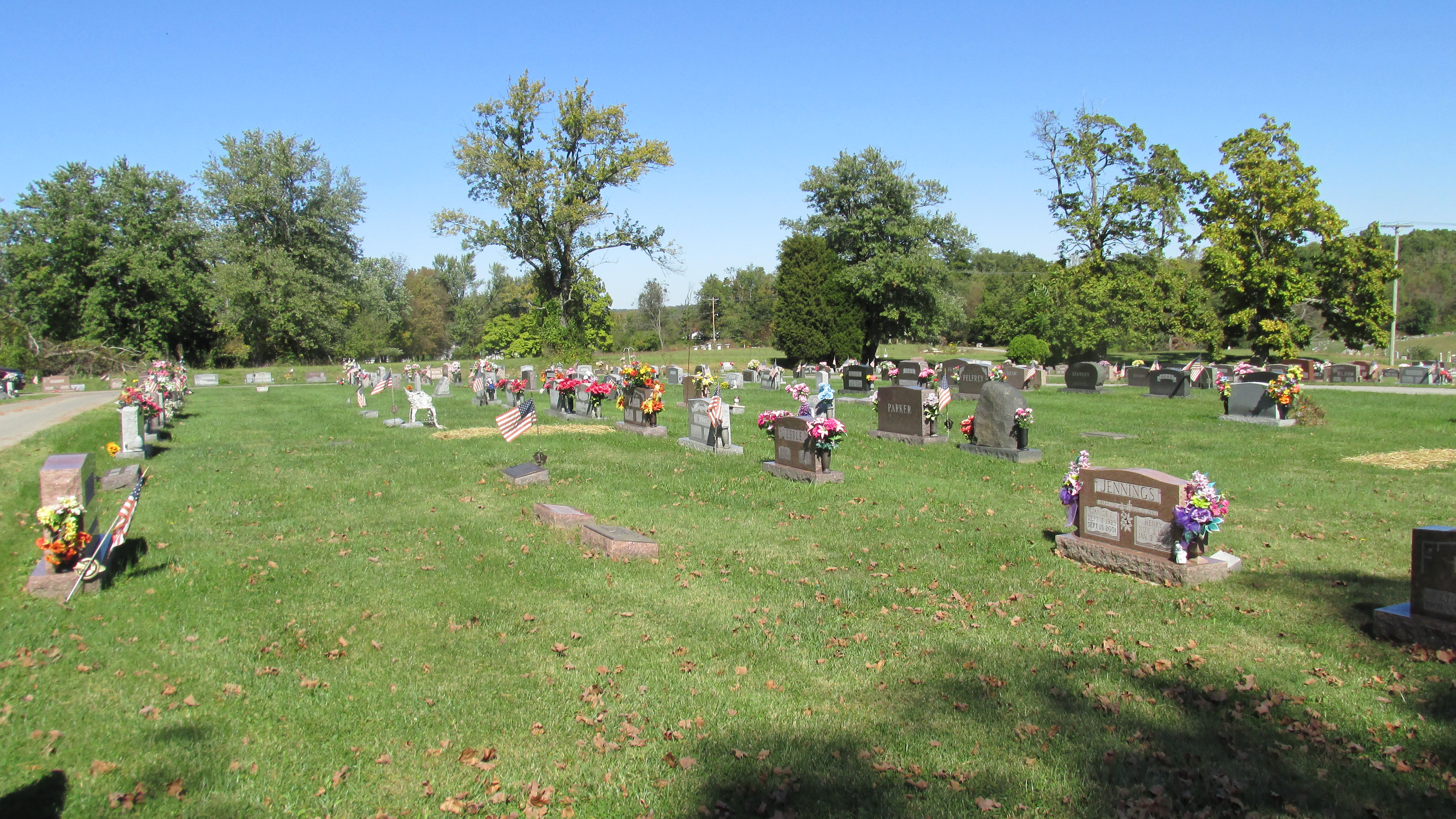
Section Q

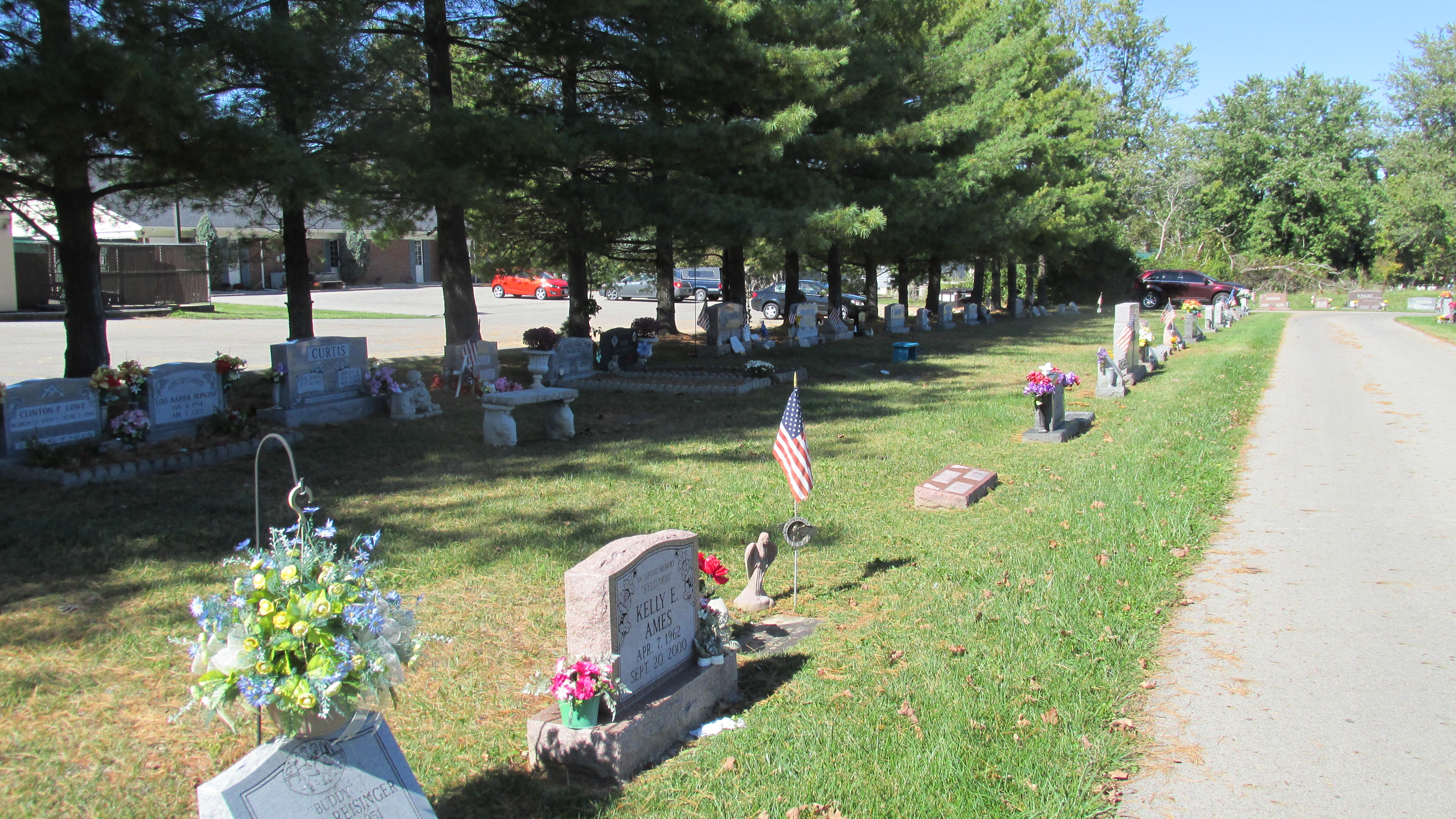
Section R

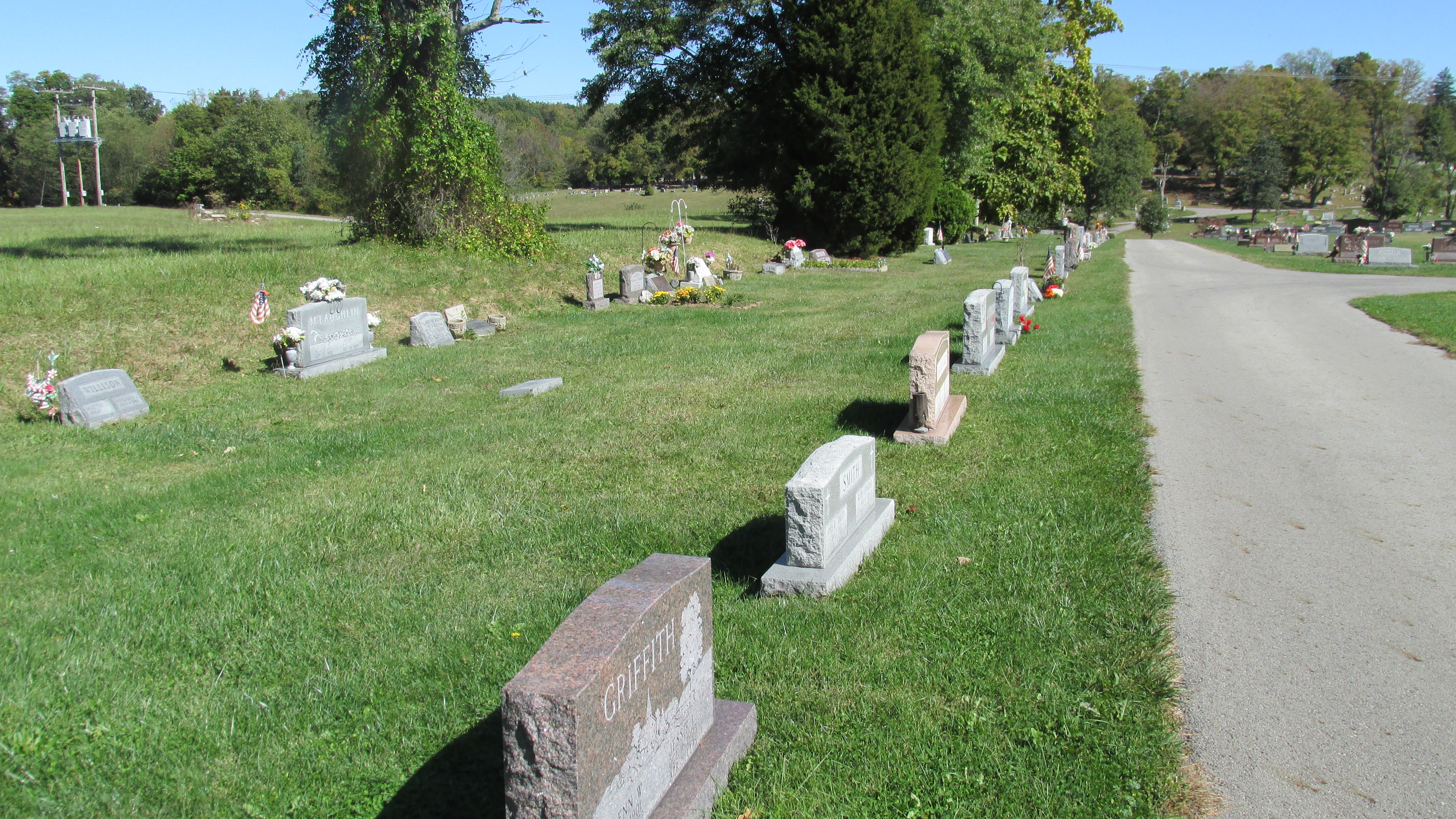
Section R

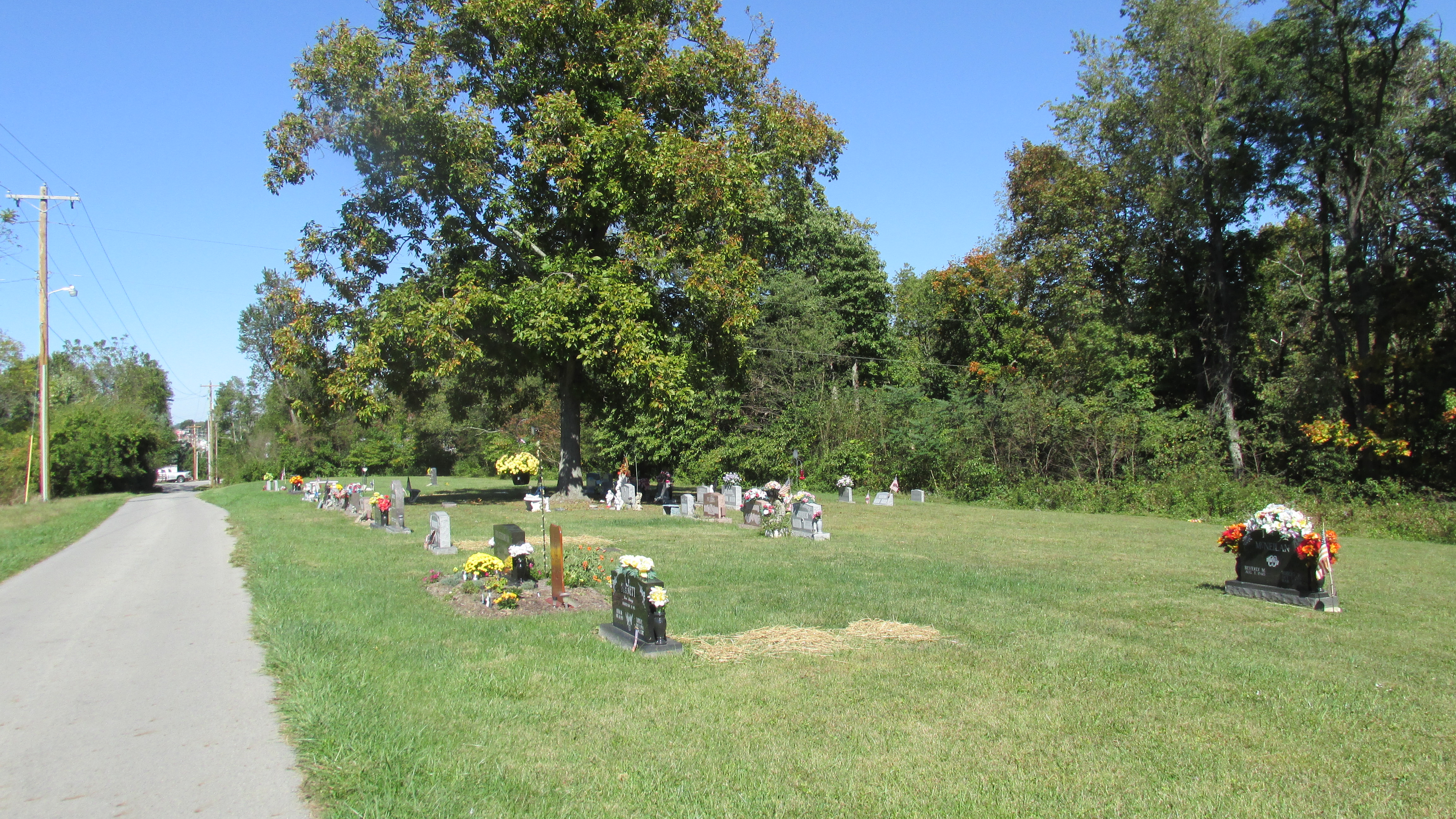
Section S

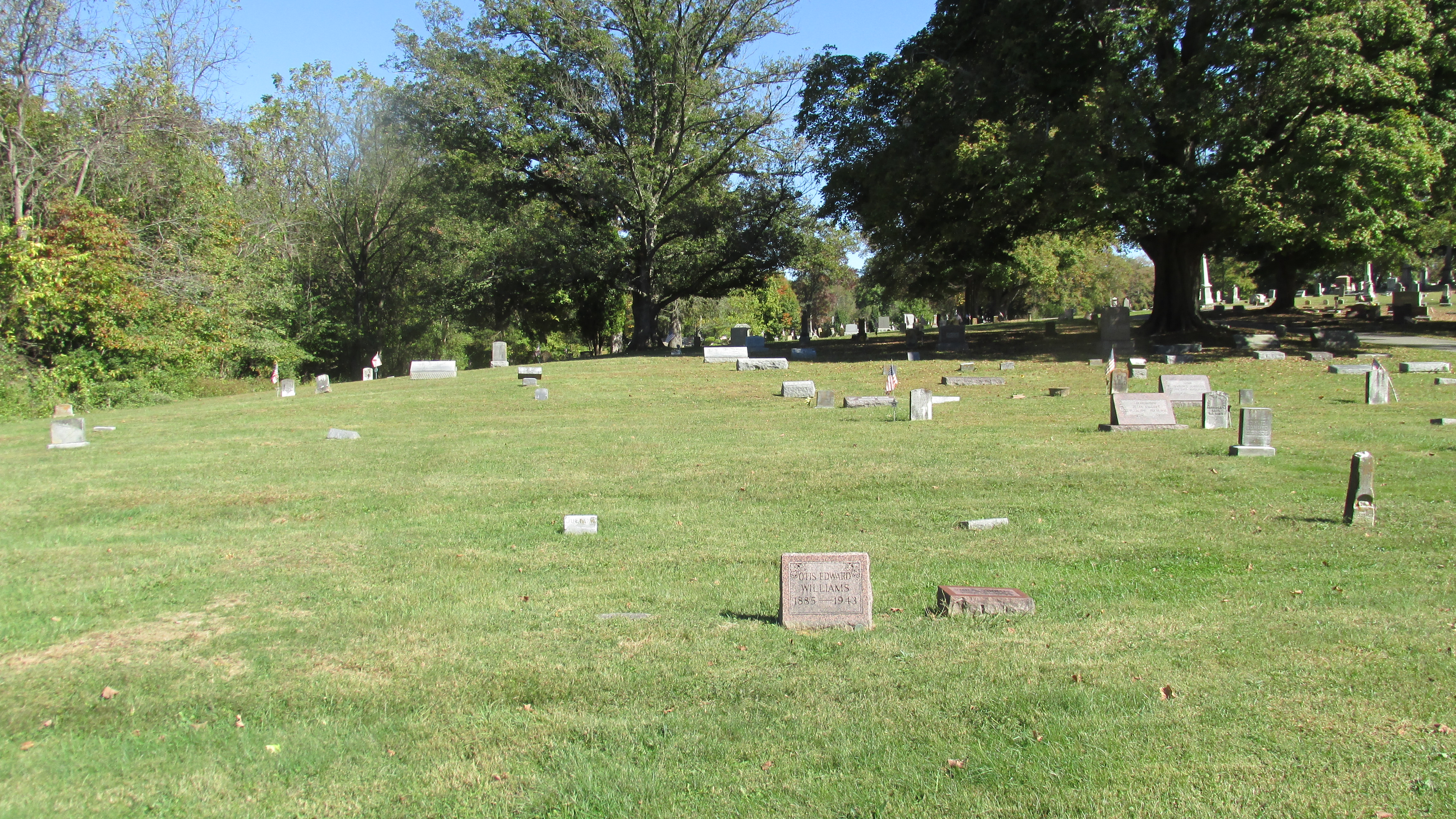
Old Colored Section

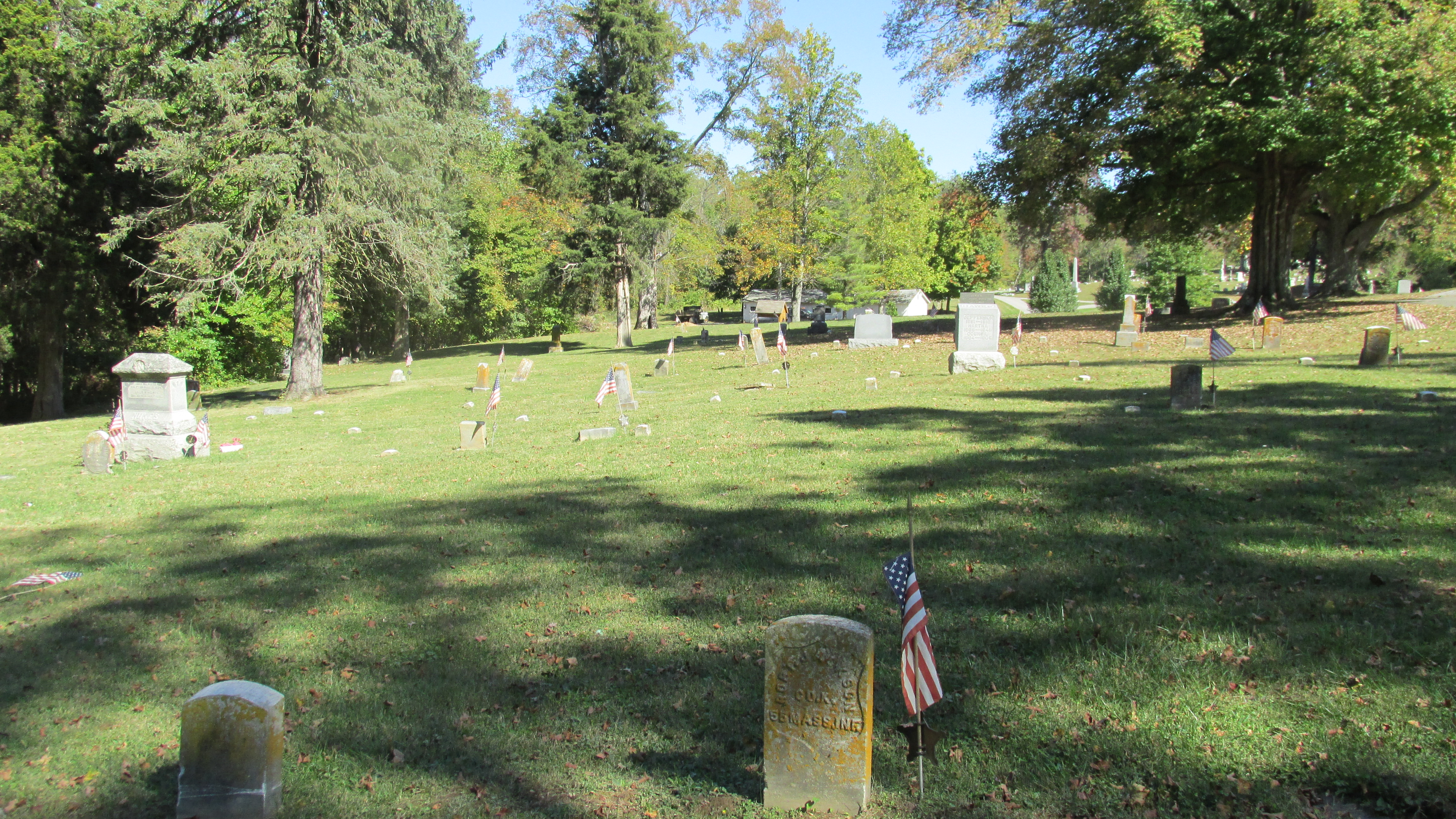
Old Colored Section

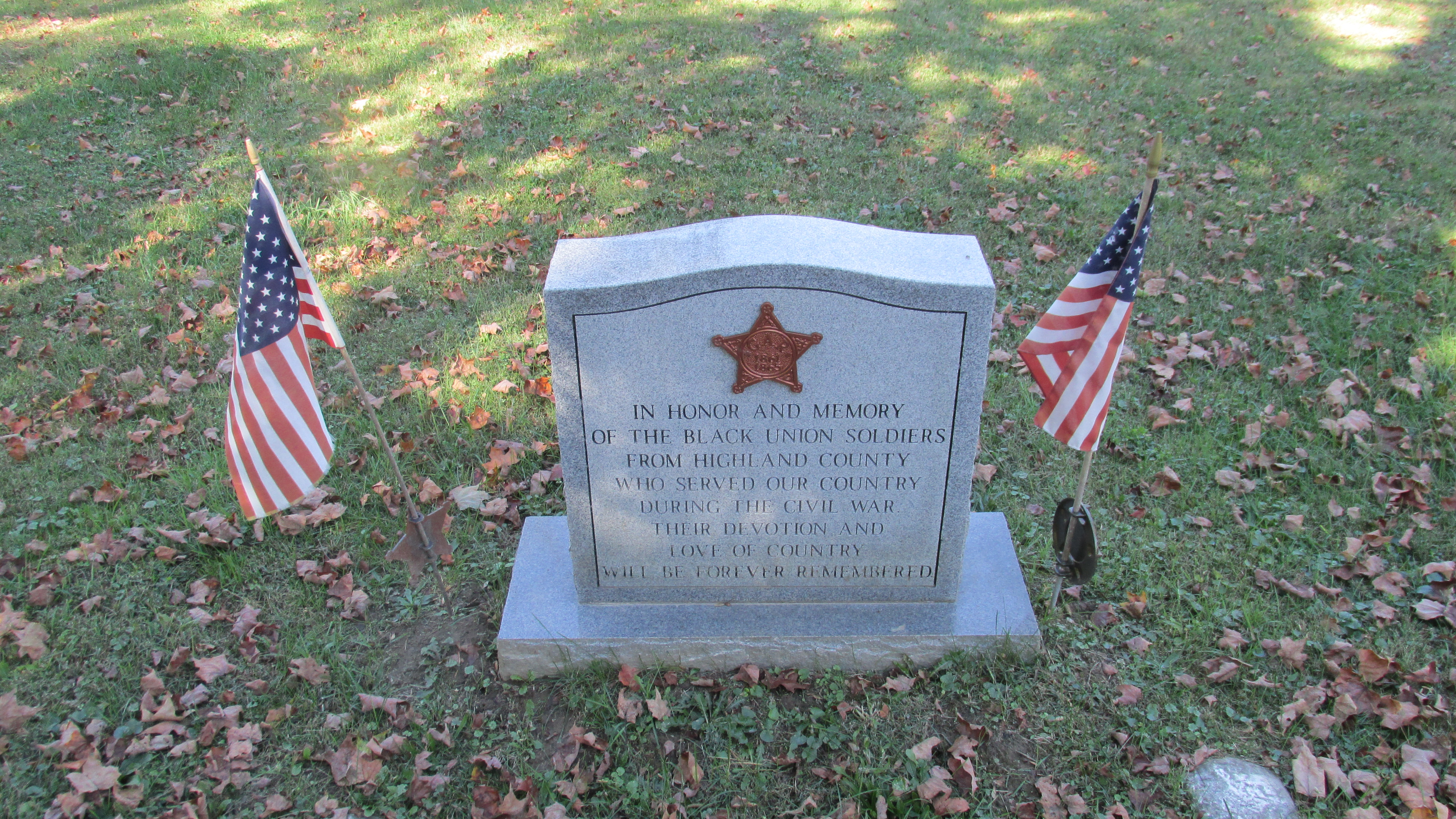
Monument to Civil War black Union soldiers from Highland County, Ohio.

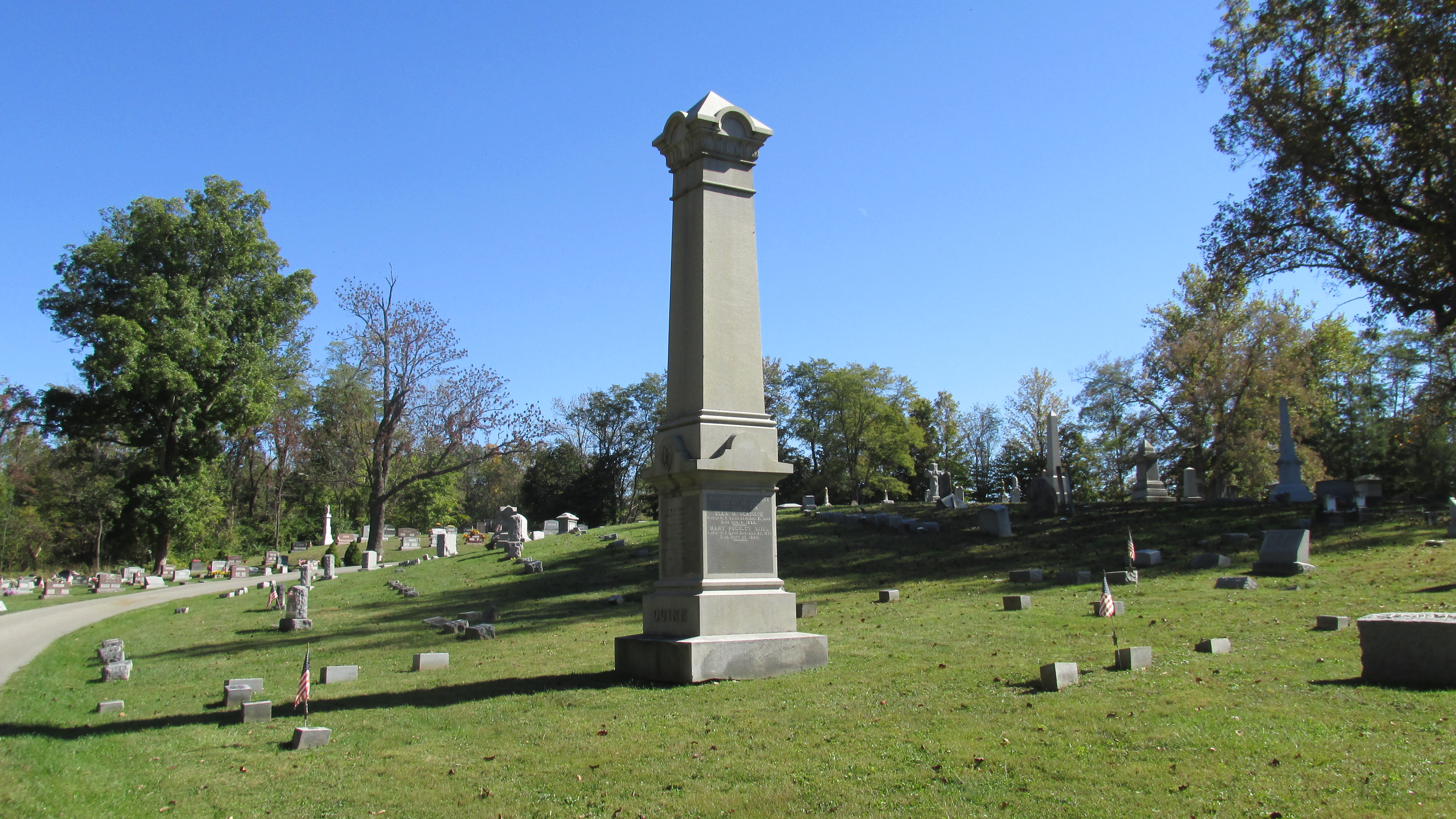
The Quinn family headstone located in Section D is the tallest monument in Hillsboro Cemetery at a height of 23 feet.

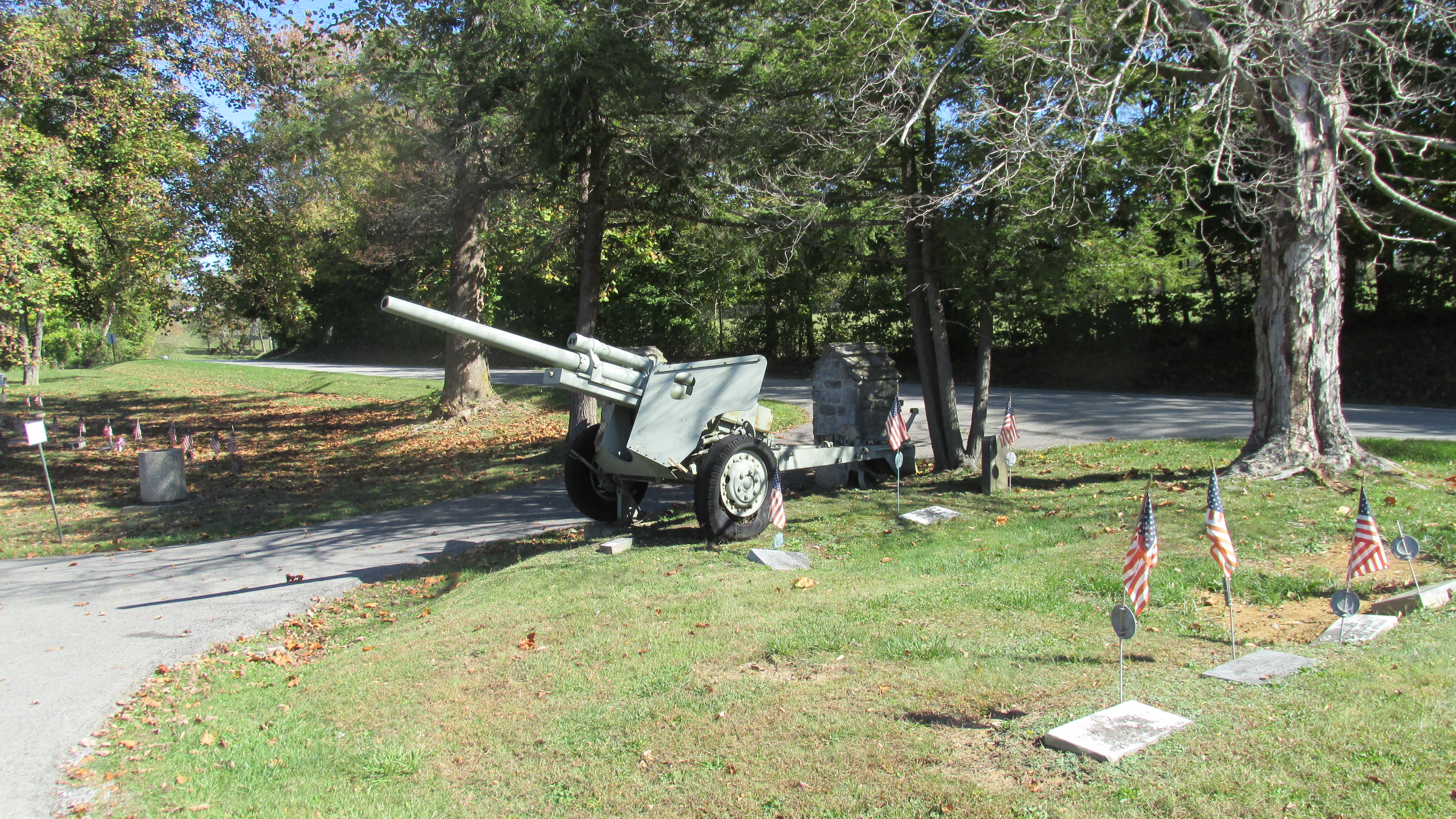
Howitzer at cemetery entrance.

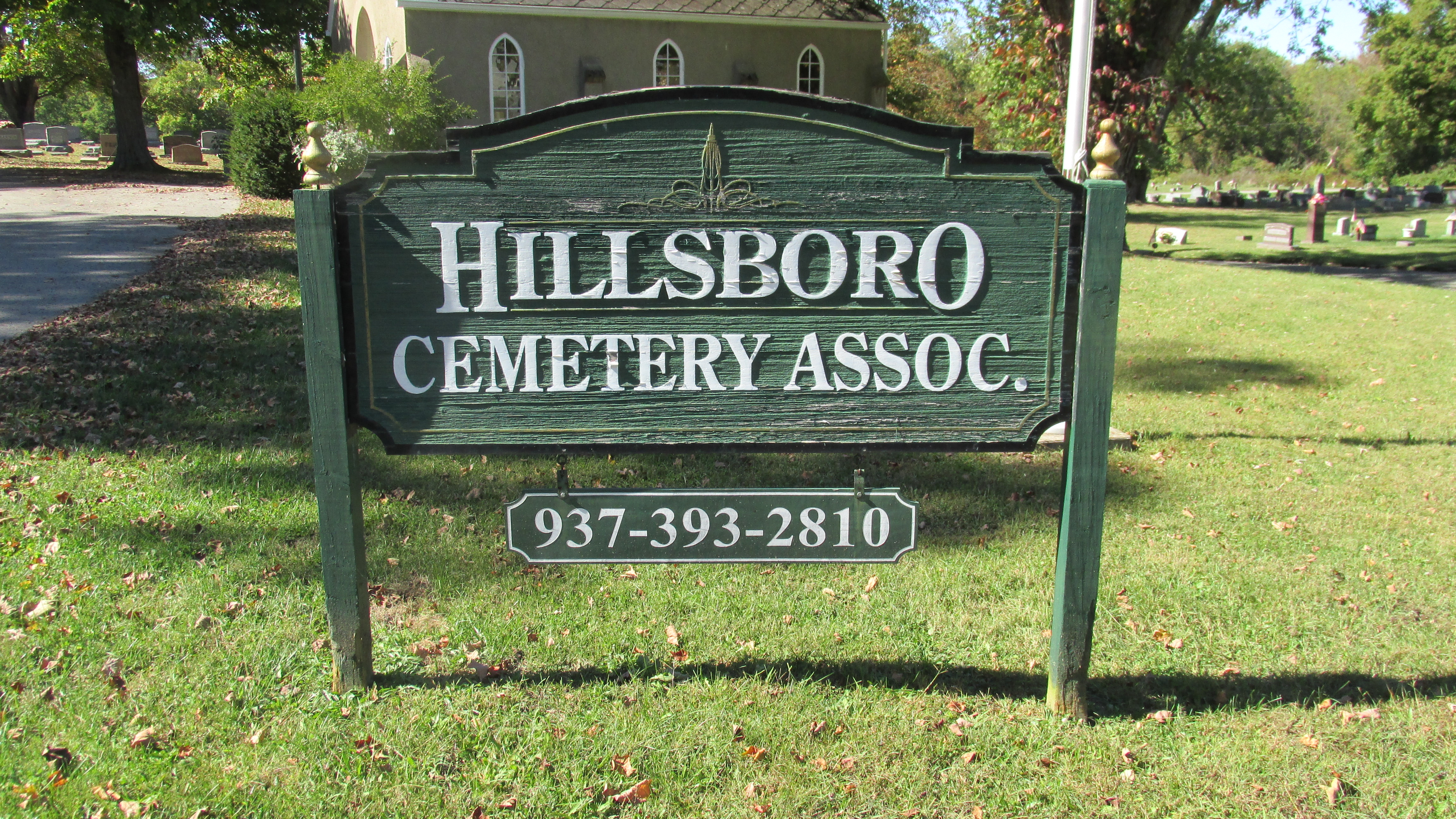
Hillsboro Cemetery Association sign.

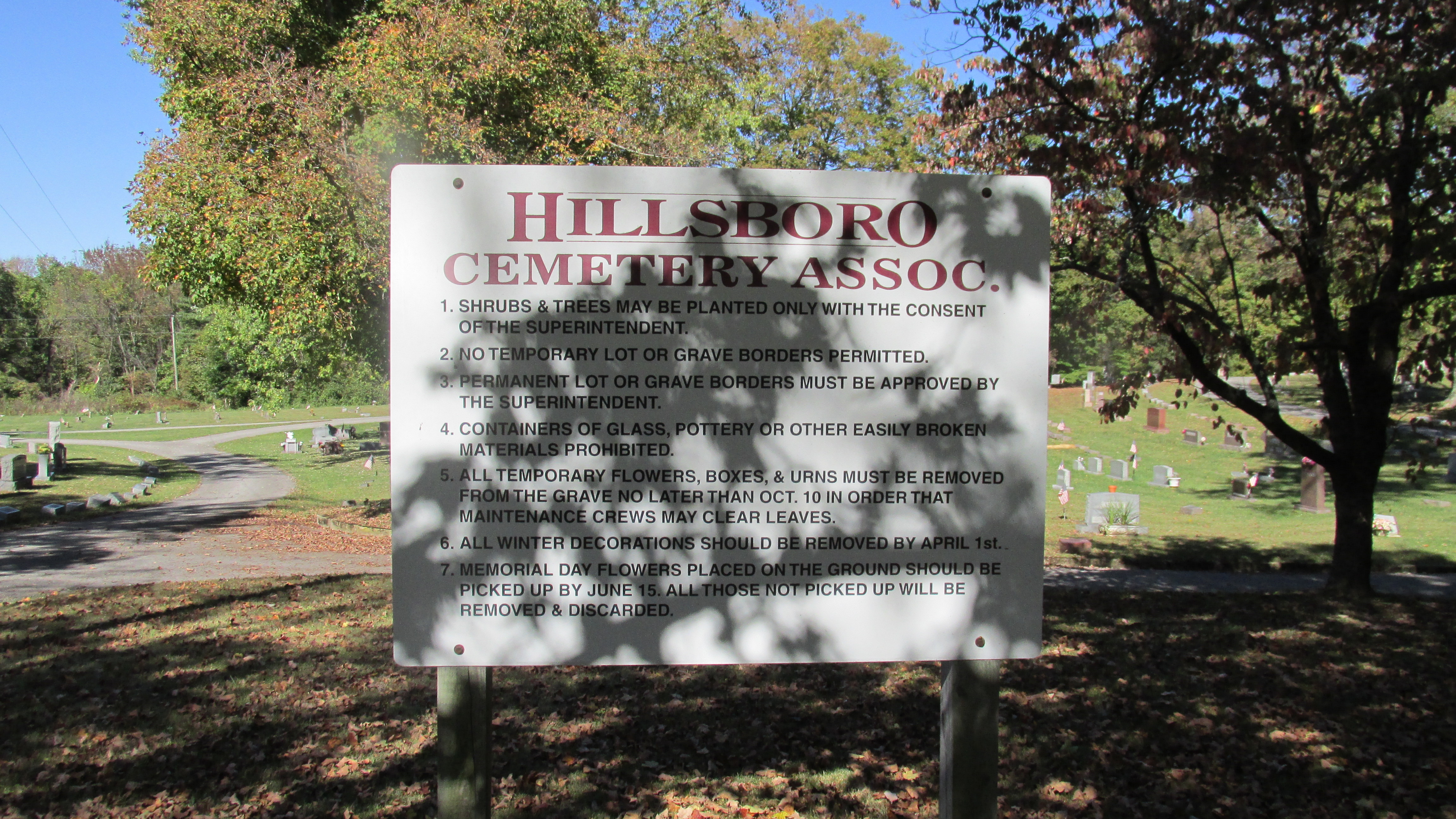
Hillsboro Cemetery Rules and Regulations sign.

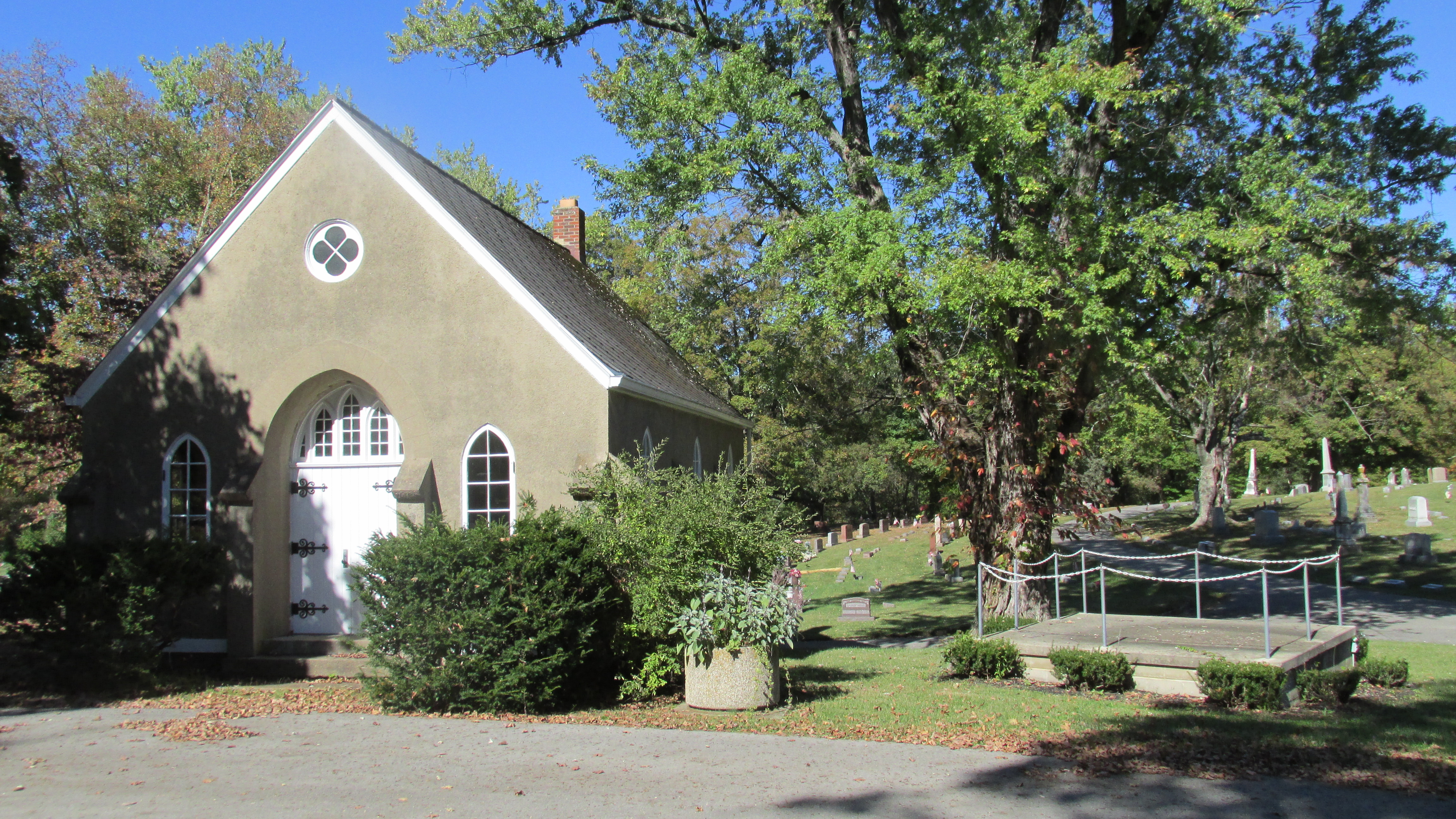
Hillsboro Cemetery chapel.
