= List of African American cemeteries =

The list of African American cemeteries includes both active and historic sites. The list is for notable African American cemeteries, and is not an attempt to list all the African American cemeteries in the United States. The listed may include large cemeteries that contain only portions of an African American burials, and former plantations and/or houses with African American cemeteries.

== Alabama ==
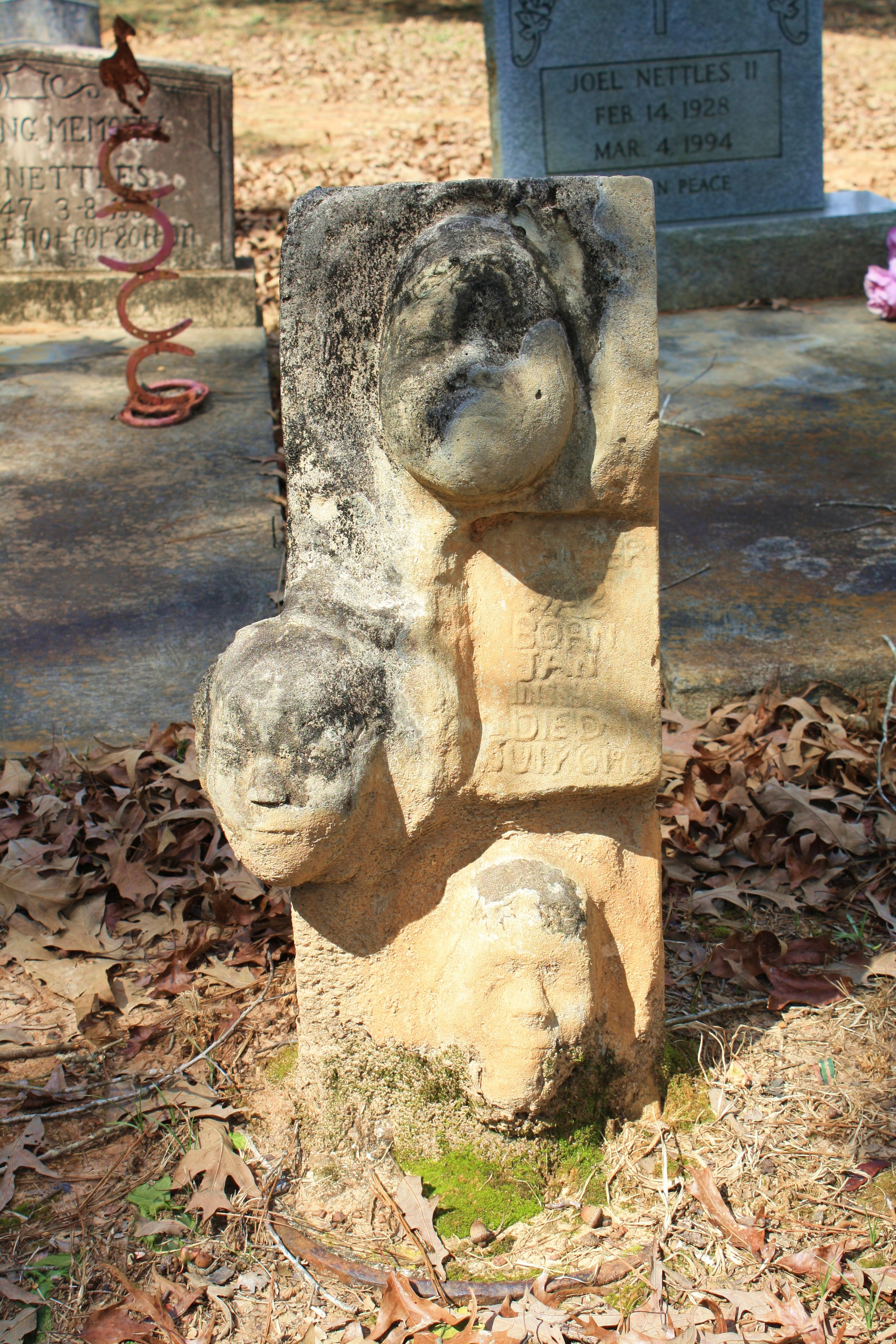
Mount Nebo Cemetery near Carlton, Alabama, one example of the Isaac Nettles Gravestones

- Forks of Cypress Cemetery near Florence, Alabama; NRHP-listed
- Glenwood Cemetery in Huntsville, Alabama
- Mount Nebo Cemetery near Carlton, Alabama; contains Isaac Nettles Gravestones; NRHP-listed

== Arkansas ==
- Bean Cemetery in Lincoln, Arkansas
- Belding-Gaines Cemetery in Garland County, Arkansas; NRHP-listed
- Bold Pilgrim Cemetery near Morrilton, Arkansas; NRHP-listed
- Forrest City Cemetery in Forrest City, Arkansas; NRHP-listed
- Hampton Springs Cemetery near Carthage, Arkansas; NRHP-listed
- Harden Family Cemetery near Jennie, Arkansas; NRHP-listed
- Mount Olive-Bedford Chapel Cemetery near Mount Vernon, Arkansas; NRHP-listed
- New Hope Missionary Baptist Church Cemetery in Lake Village, Arkansas; NRHP-listed
- Oakland-Fraternal Cemetery in Little Rock, Arkansas; NRHP-listed
- Scott Bond Family Plot in Madison, Arkansas; NRHP-listed
- Scott Cemetery in Walnut Ridge, Arkansas; NRHP-listed

== Connecticut ==
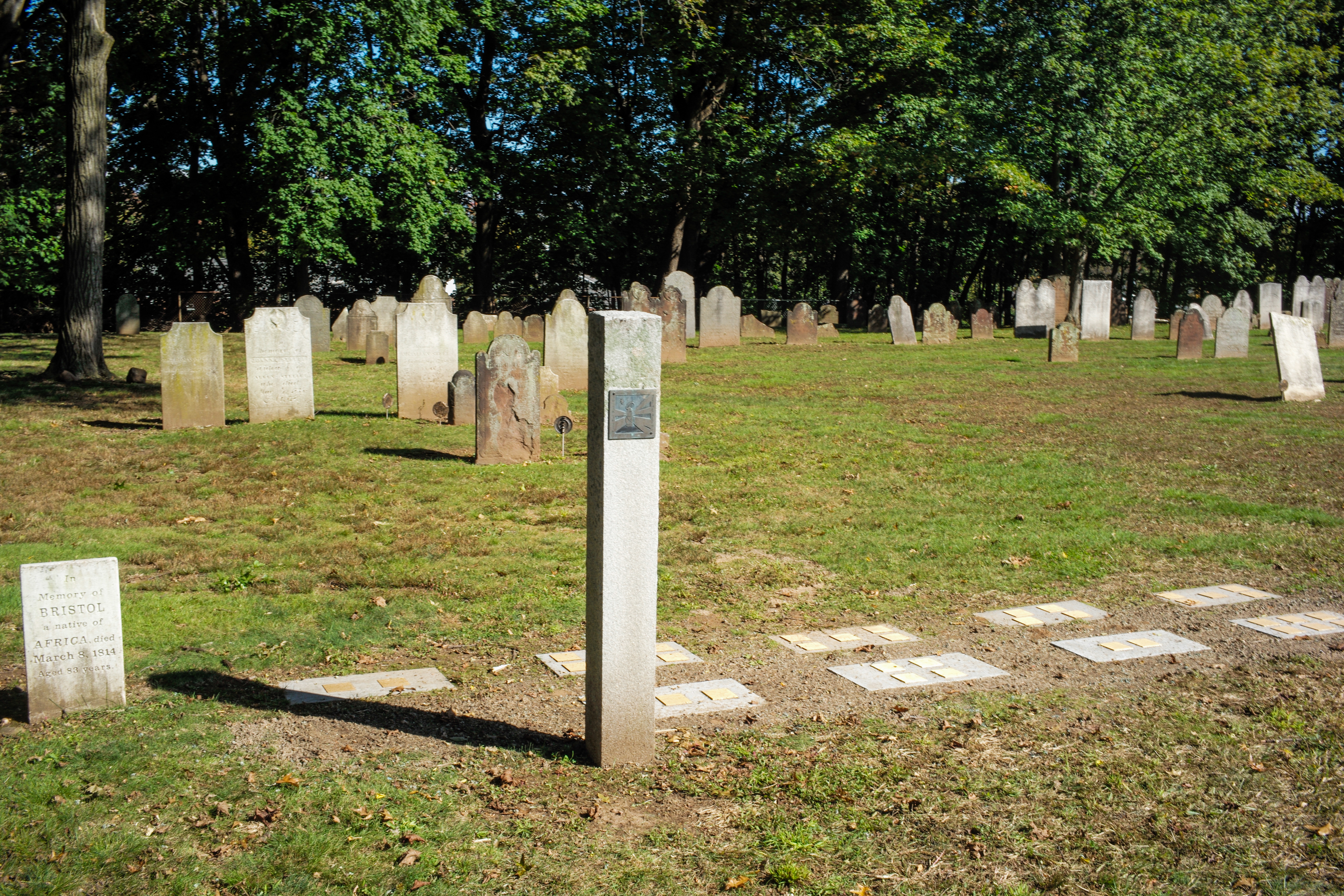
Old Center Burying Yard in West Hartford, Connecticut, image of the Connecticut Freedom Trail Monument and assemblage of memorial plaques for the enslaved, and a grave marker for Bristol

- Judea Cemetery in Washington, Connecticut
- Old Center Burying Yard in West Hartford, Connecticut; NRHP-listed

== Delaware ==
- Mount Olive Cemetery in Wilmington, Delaware

== Florida ==
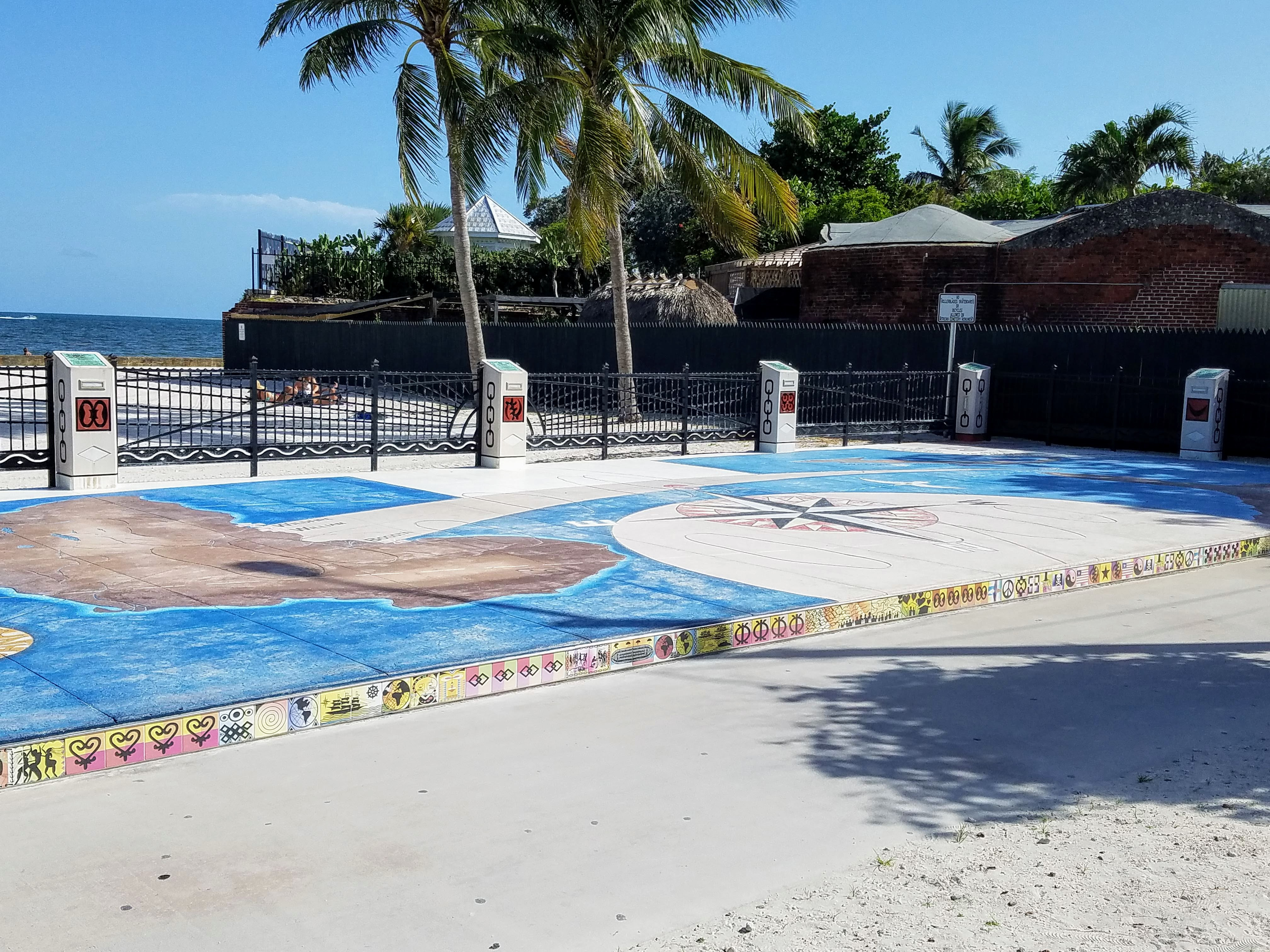
African Cemetery at Higgs Beach in Key West, Florida

- African Cemetery at Higgs Beach in Key West, Florida
- Evergreen Cemetery in Bartow, Florida
- Evergreen Memorial Cemetery in Miami, Floria
- Greenwood Cemetery in Tallahassee, Florida
- Lincoln Memorial Park in Miami, Floria
- North Greenwood Cemetery in Clearwater, Florida
- North Woodlawn Cemetery in Fort Lauderdale, Florida
- Tiger Flowers Cemetery in Lakeland, Florida
- Tolomato Cemetery in St. Augustine, Florida
- Westview Community Cemetery in Pompano Beach, Florida

== Georgia (state) ==
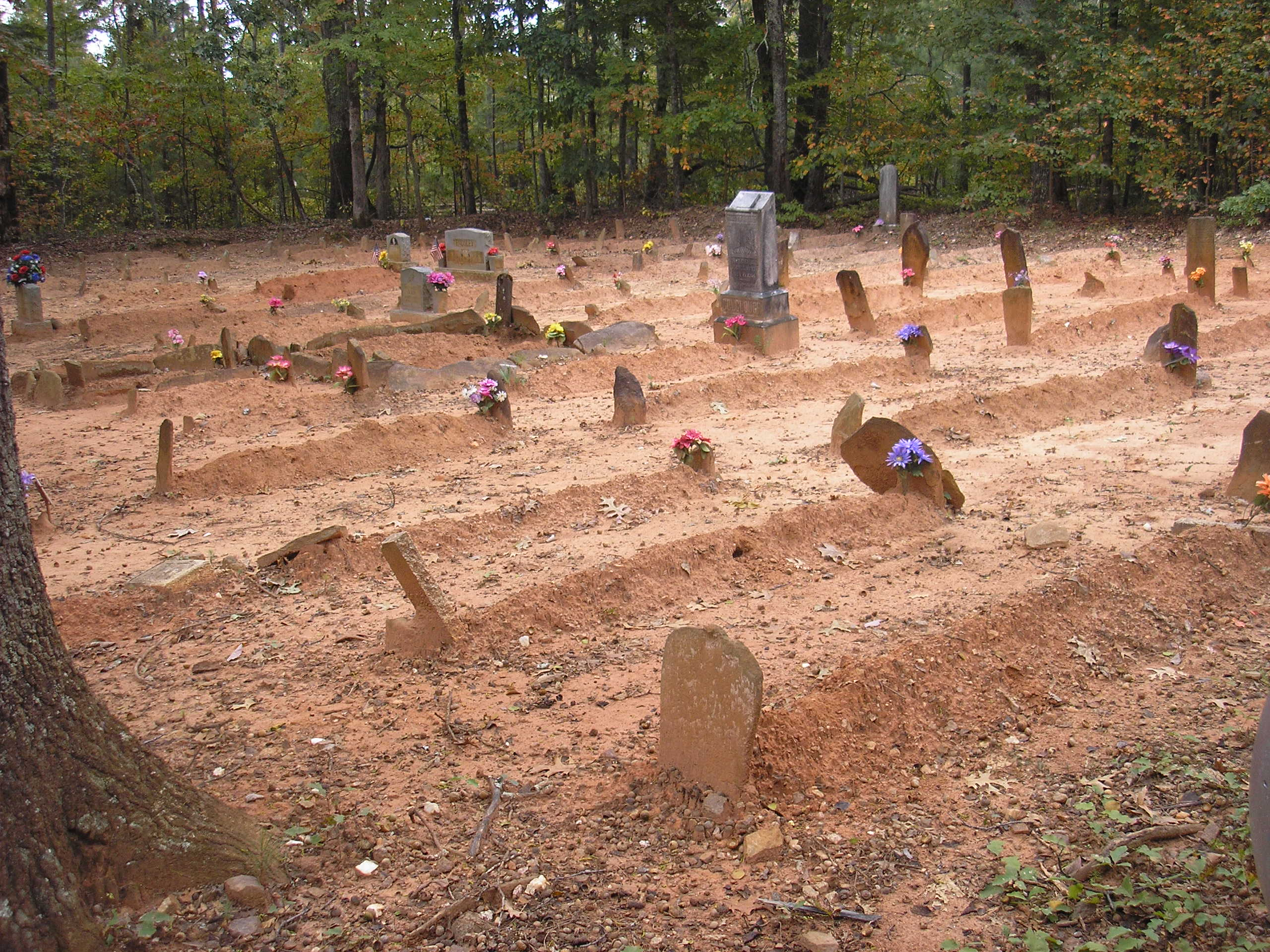
Basket Creek Cemetery near Douglasville, Georgia

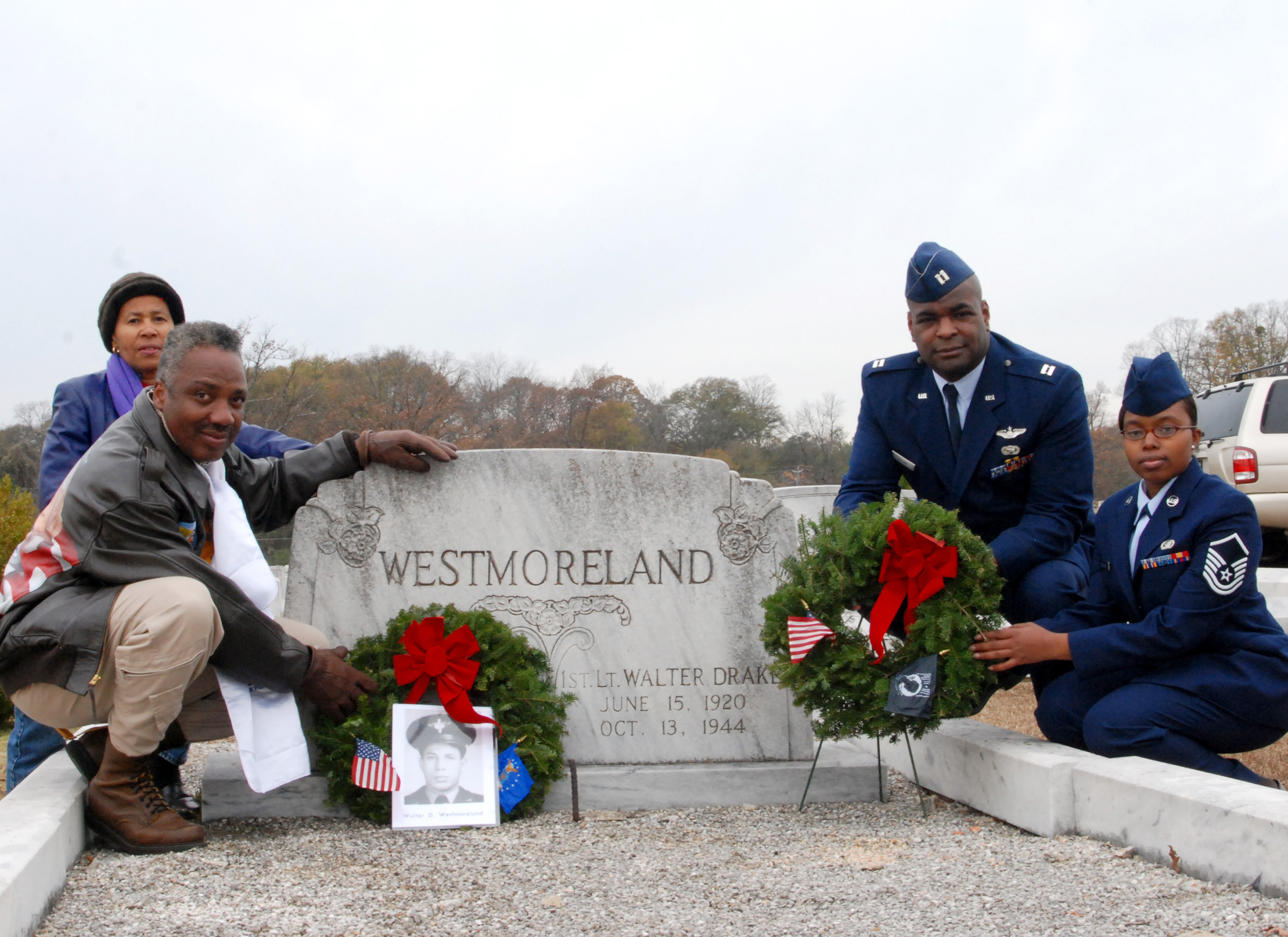
South-View Cemetery (2010) in Atlanta, Georgia, grave of Walter Drake Westmoreland

- Basket Creek Cemetery near Douglasville, Georgia
- Behavior Cemetery near Hog Hammock, Georgia
- Black Pioneers Cemetery, Euharlee in Euharlee, Georgia
- Gospel Pilgrim Cemetery in Athens, Georgia
- Jackson Street Cemetery in Athens, Georgia
- Lott Cemetery in Waycross, Georgia
- Rose Hill Cemetery in Macon, Georgia
- South-View Cemetery in Atlanta, Georgia
- Utoy Cemetery in Atlanta, Georgia

== Illinois ==
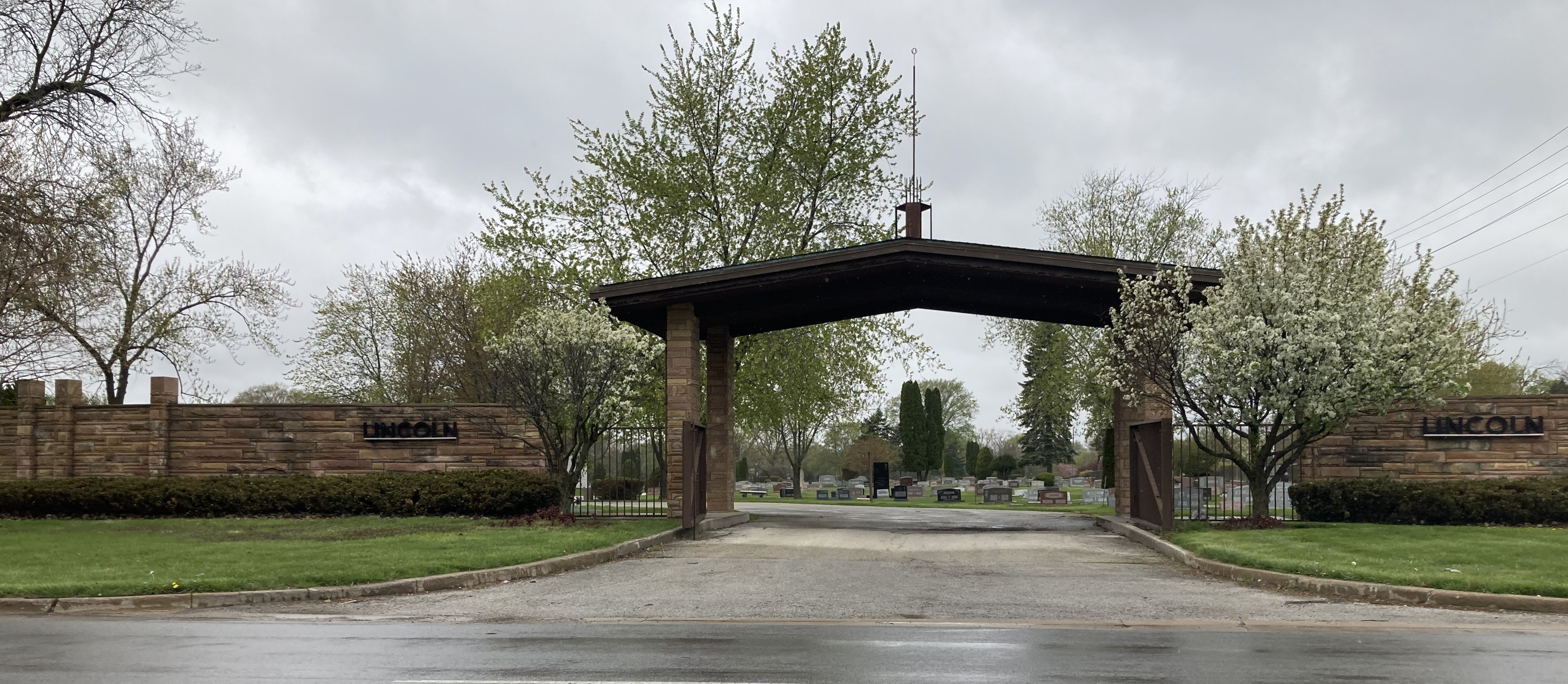
Lincoln Cemetery in Blue Island, Illinois

- African American Cemetery in New Philadelphia, Illinois
- Burr Oak Cemetery in Alsip, Illinois
- Lincoln Cemetery in Blue Island, Illinois
- Restvale Cemetery in Alsip, Illinois

== Iowa ==
- South Jordan Cemetery near Moorhead, Iowa; NRHP-listed

== Kentucky ==
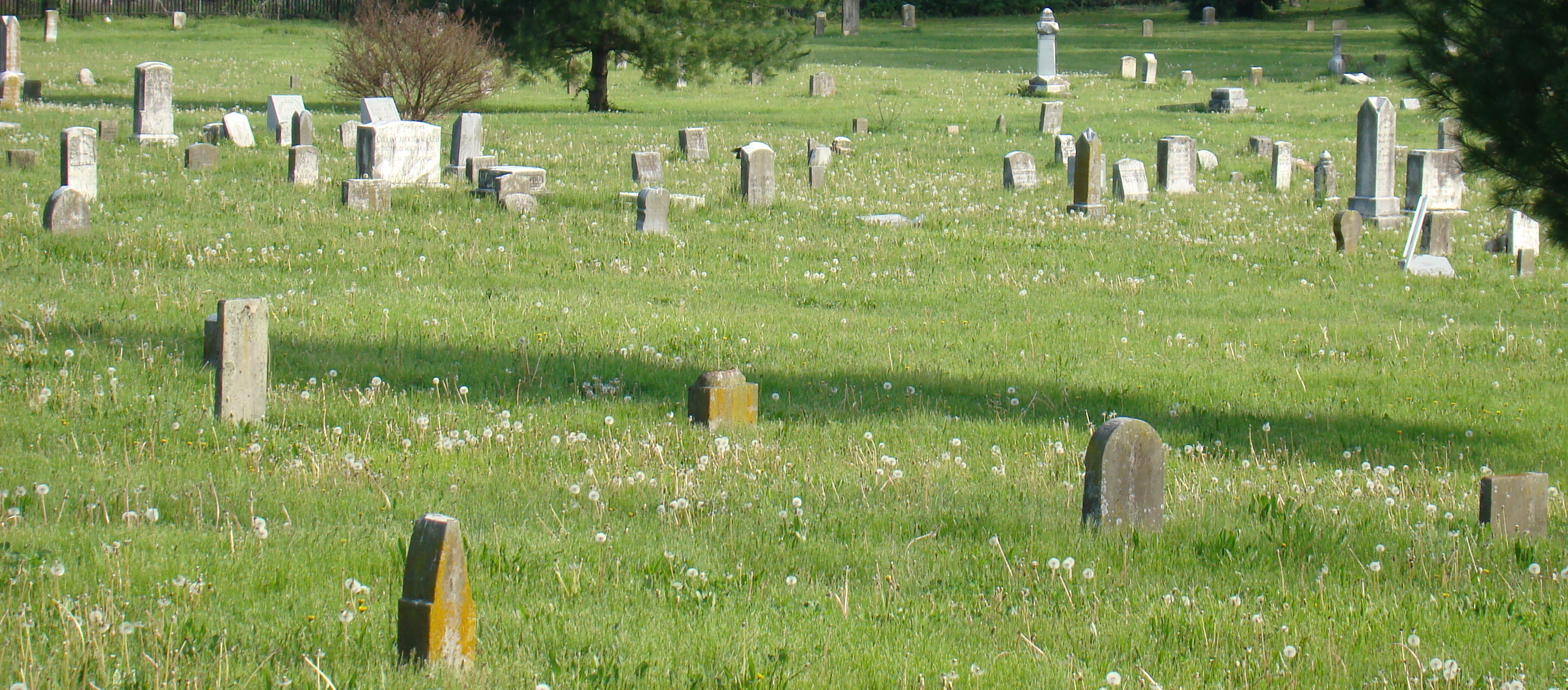
African Cemetery No. 2 in Lexington, Kentucky

- African Cemetery No. 2 in Lexington, Kentucky

== Louisiana ==
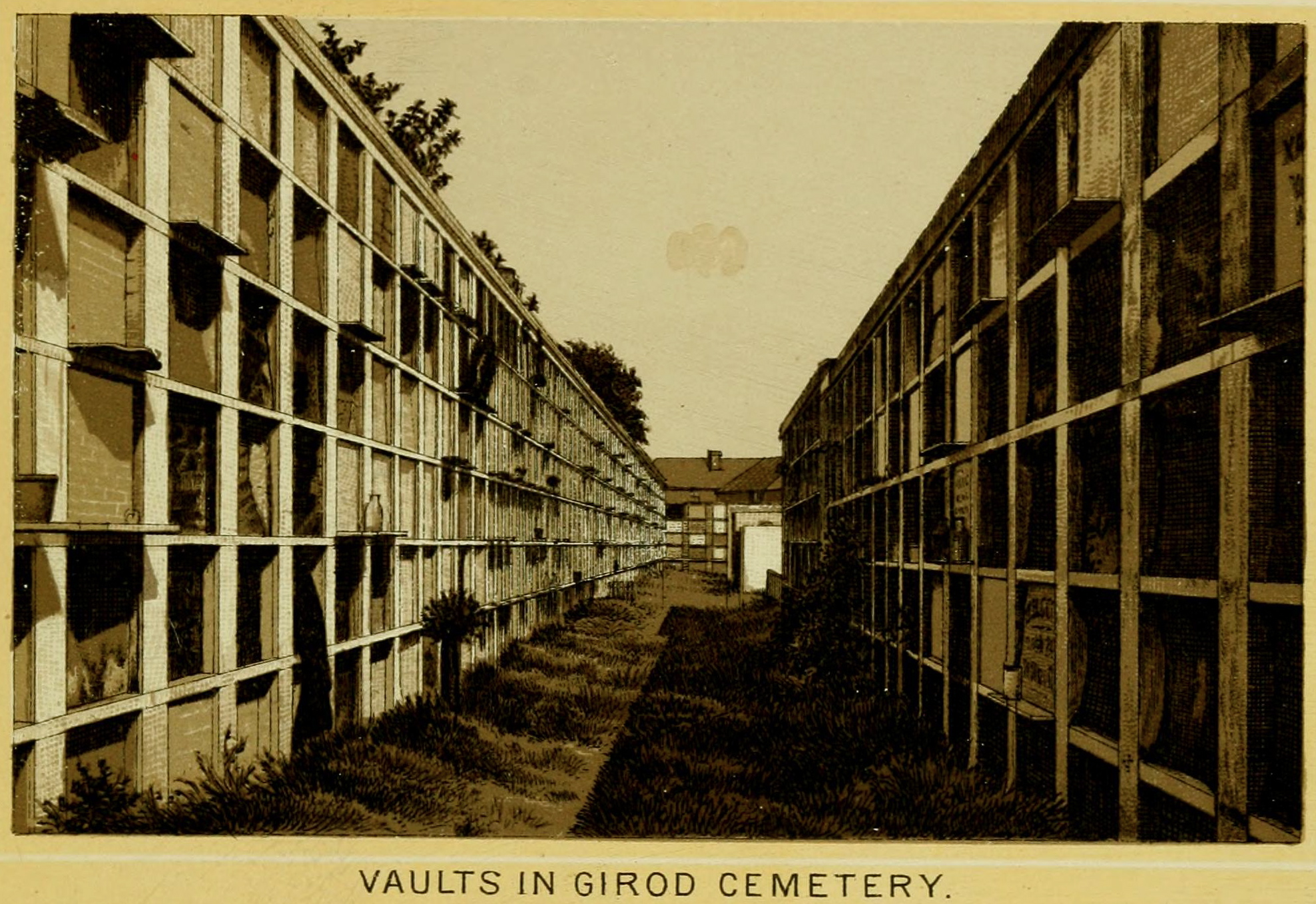
Girod Street Cemetery in New Orleans, Louisiana

- Freedmen's Cemetery in Chalmette, Louisiana
- Girod Street Cemetery in New Orleans, Louisiana
- St. Augustine Catholic Church and Cemetery in Natchez, Louisiana
- Saint Louis Cemetery in New Orleans, Louisiana
- Shrewsbury (Camp Parapet) Cemetery in New Orleans, Louisiana

== Maryland ==
- Laboring Sons Memorial Grounds in Frederick, Maryland
- Laurel Cemetery in Baltimore, Maryland
- Lincoln Memorial Cemetery in Suitland, Maryland
- Mount Auburn Cemetery in Baltimore, Maryland
- Mount Gilboa Chapel in Oella, Maryland; around 24 graves
- Watkins Slave Cemetery in Davidsonville, Maryland

== Massachusetts ==
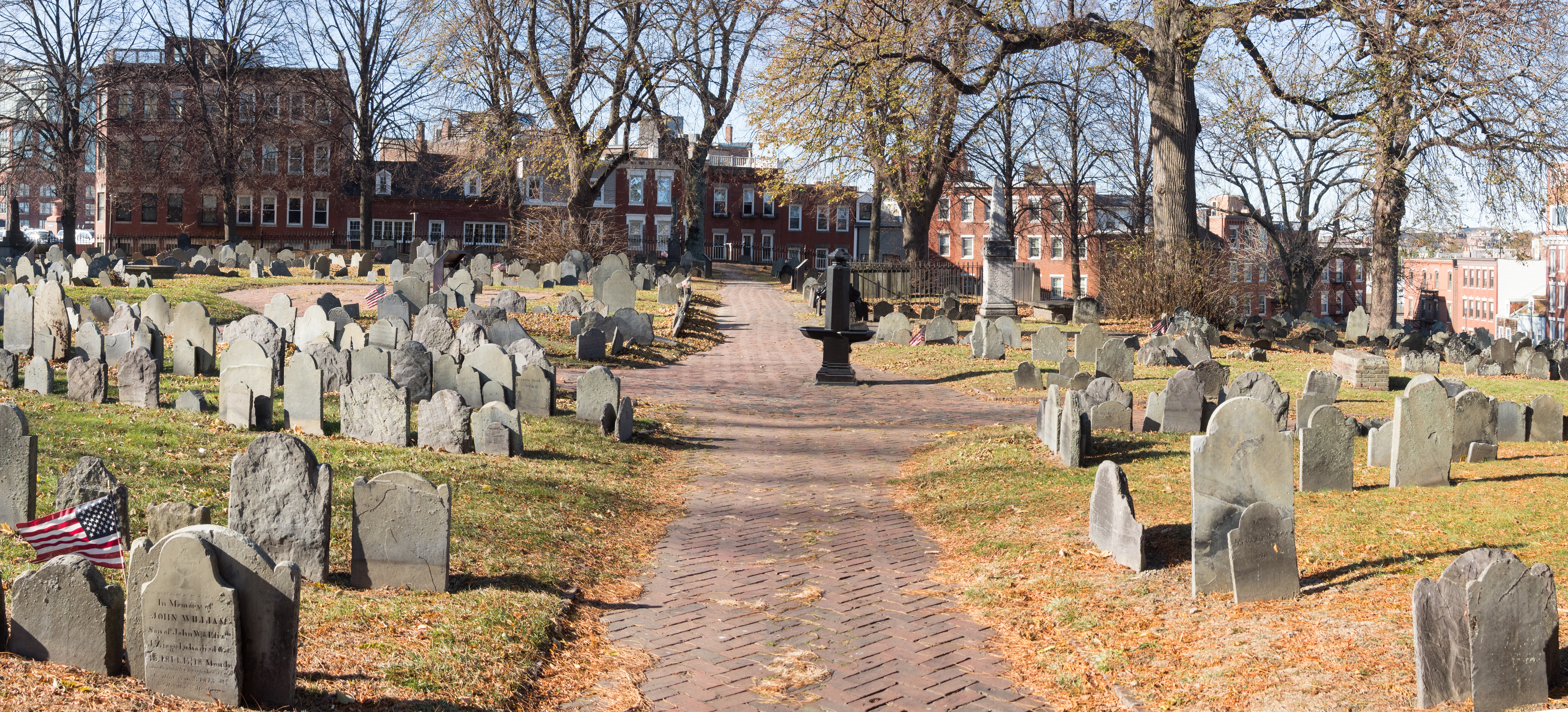
Copp's Hill Burying Ground in Boston, Massachusetts

- Copp's Hill Burying Ground in Boston, Massachusetts
- Prince Hall Mystic Cemetery in Arlington, Massachusetts
- Rumney Marsh Burying Ground in Revere, Massachusetts

== Michigan ==
- Morgan West Wheatland Cemetery in Wheatland Township, Michigan

== Mississippi ==
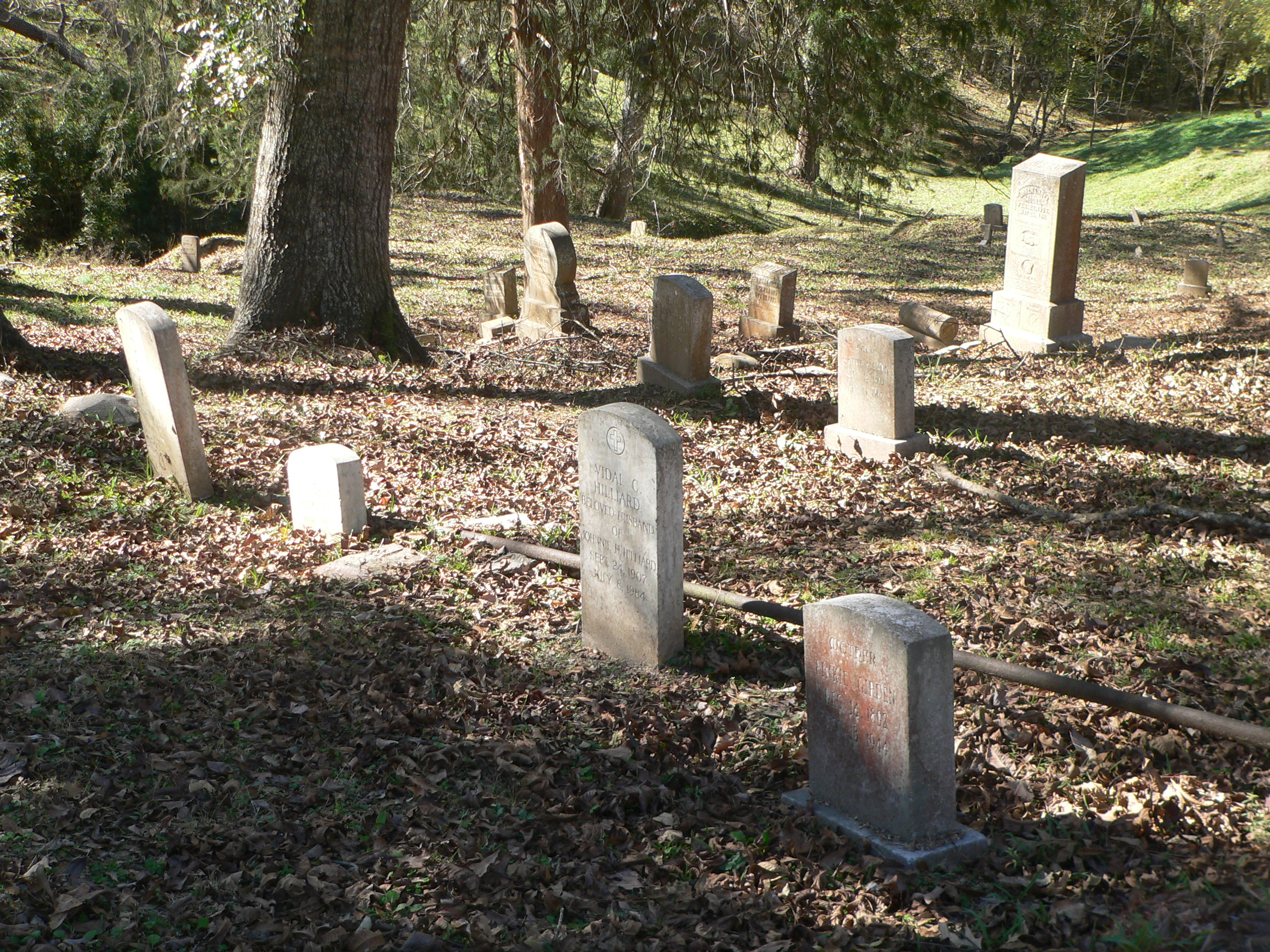
Beulah Cemetery in Vicksburg, Mississippi

- Beulah Cemetery in Vicksburg, Mississippi
- Mount Olive Cemetery in Jackson, Mississippi
- Odd Fellows Cemetery in Starkville, Mississippi
- Sandfield Cemetery in Columbus, Mississippi

== Missouri ==
- Berry Cemetery near Ash Grove, Missouri
- Columbia Cemetery in Columbia, Missouri
- Father Dickson Cemetery in Crestwood, Missouri
- Greenwood Cemetery in Hillsdale, Missouri
- Quinette Cemetery in Kirkwood, Missouri
- Sappington Cemetery State Historic Site in Saline County, Missouri
- Washington Park Cemetery in Berkeley, Missouri

== New Hampshire ==
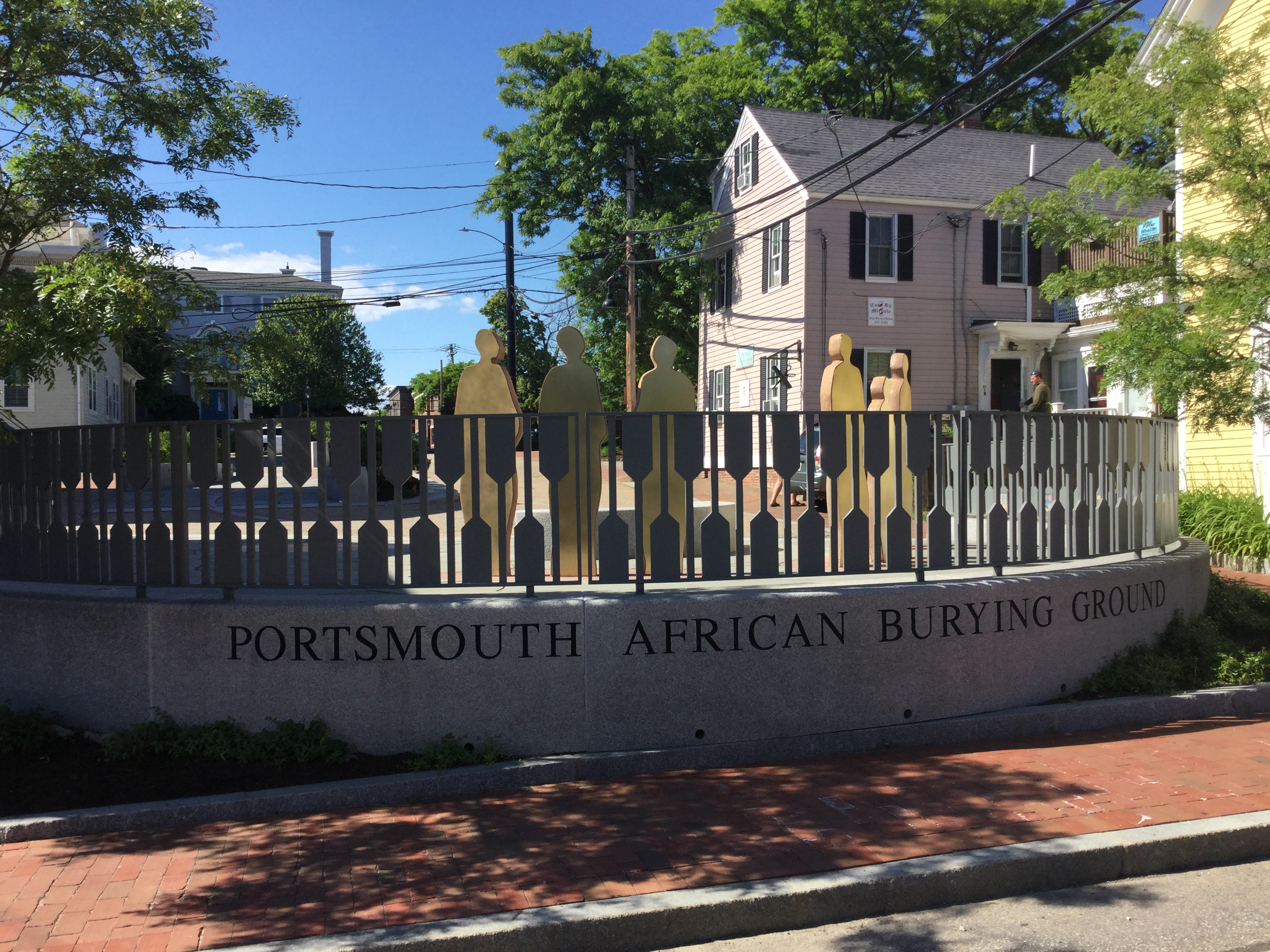
Portsmouth African Burying Ground Memorial Park in Portsmouth, New Hampshire

- Portsmouth African Burying Ground in Portsmouth, New Hampshire; now a memorial park

== New Jersey ==
- Gethsemane Cemetery in Little Ferry, New Jersey; NRHP-listed
- Lamington Black Cemetery in Lamington, New Jersey; part of the Lamington Historic District
- Mount Zion Cemetery in Woolwich Township, New Jersey; NRHP-listed and NJRHP-listed

== Ohio ==
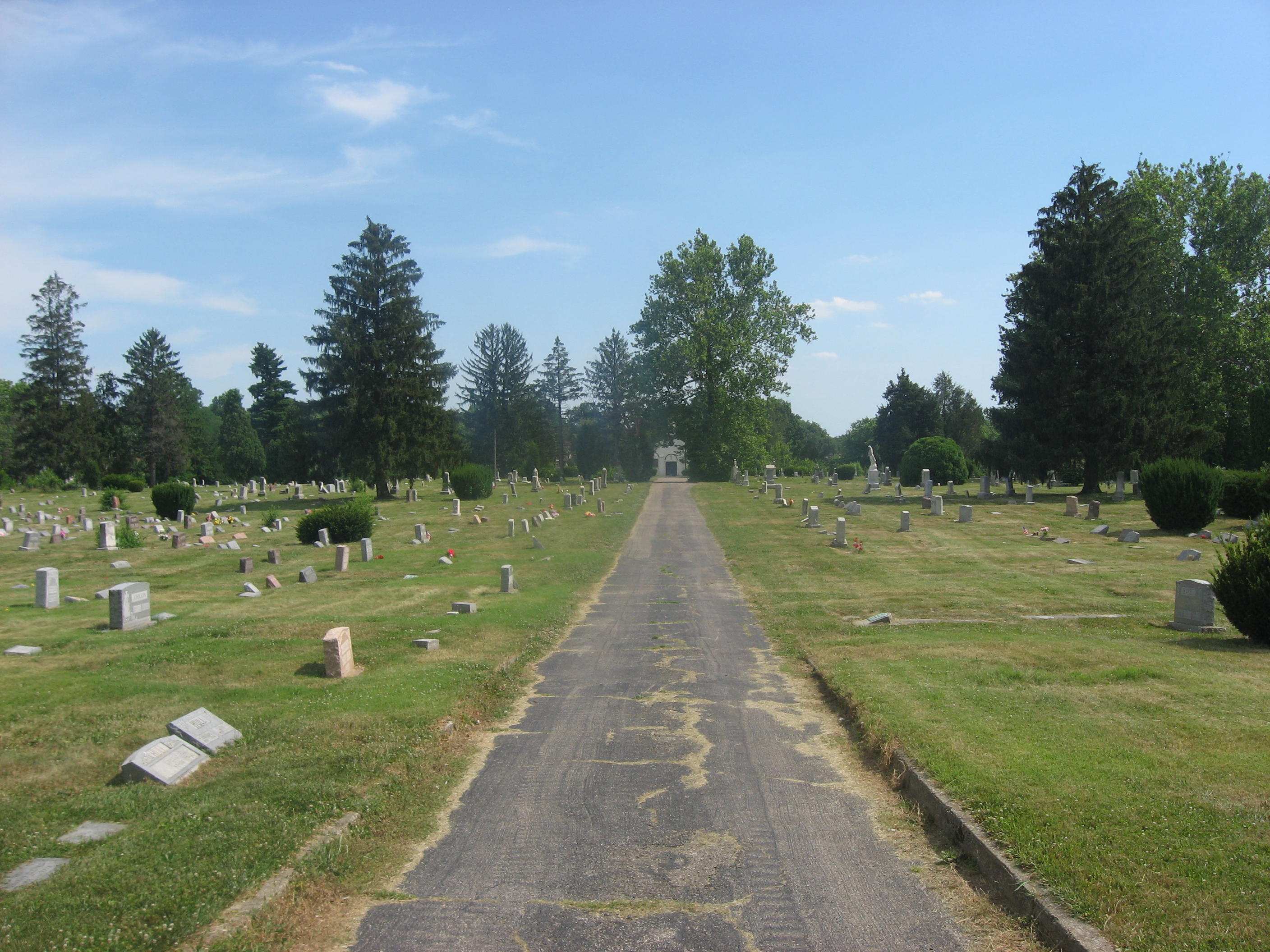
Union Baptist Cemetery in Cincinnati, Ohio

- African Jackson Cemetery in Miami County, Ohio; NRHP-listed
- Hillsboro Cemetery in Hillsboro, Ohio
- Union Baptist Cemetery in Cincinnati, Ohio; NRHP-listed
- United American Cemetery in Cincinnati, Ohio

== Oklahoma ==
- Gower Cemetery in Edmond, Oklahoma; NRHP-listed
- St. Paul Baptist Church and Cemetery near Meeker, Oklahoma; NRHP-listed

== Oregon ==
- Mt. Union Cemetery in Philomath, Oregon

== Pennsylvania ==
- Bethel Burial Ground in South Philadelphia, Pennsylvania; NRHP-listed
- Eden Cemetery in Collingdale, Pennsylvania
- Lebanon Cemetery in Philadelphia, Pennsylvania
- Lincoln Cemetery in Harrisburg, Pennsylvania
- Little Jerusalem AME Church in Cornwells Heights, Pennsylvania; NRHP-listed, contains a civil war-era cemetery
- Slate Hill Cemetery in Lower Makefield Township, Pennsylvania; NRHP-listed

== Rhode Island ==
- Common Burying Ground and Island Cemetery in Newport, Rhode Island; NRHP-listed

== South Carolina ==
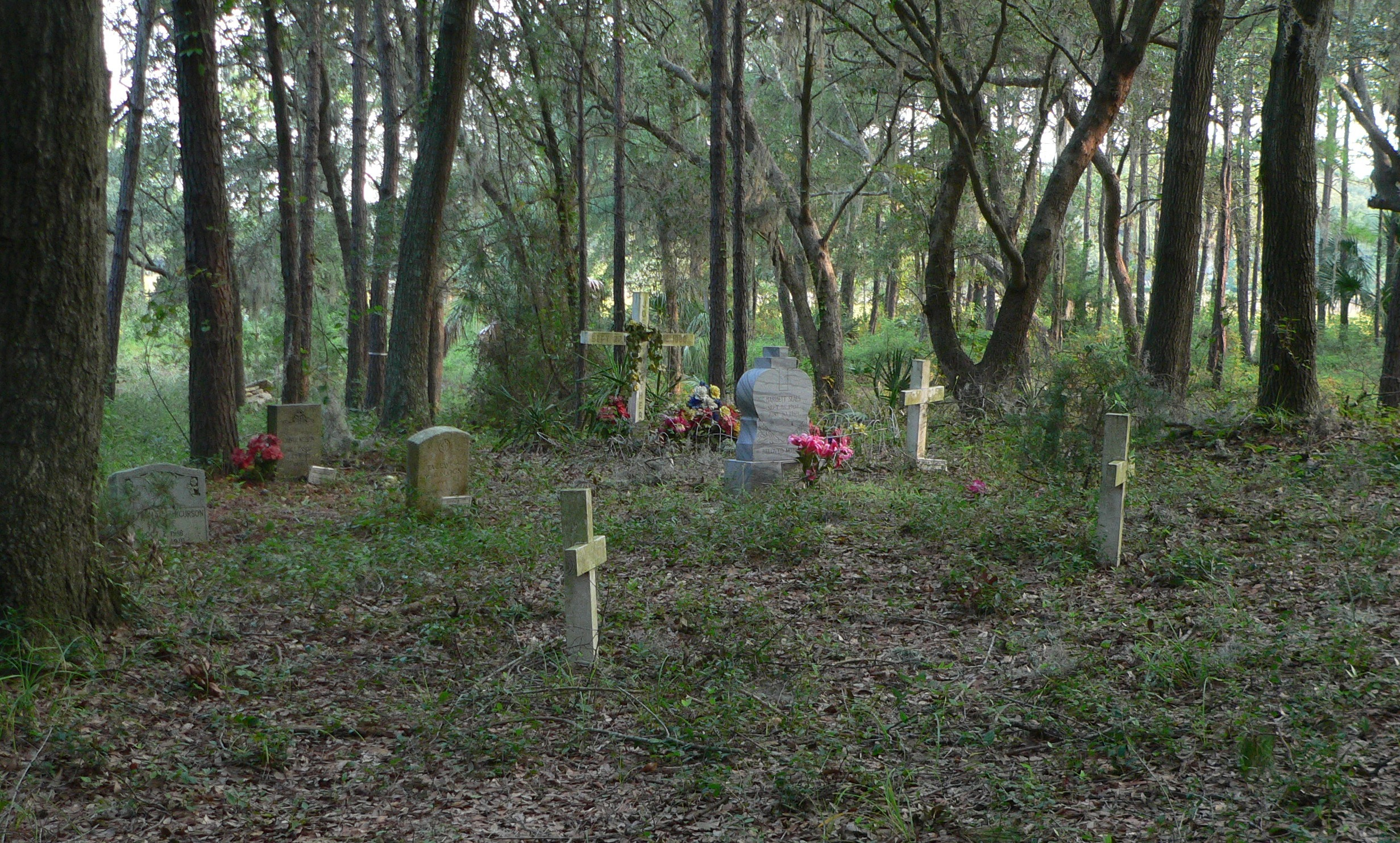
Remley Point Cemetery in Mount Pleasant, South Carolina

- Aiken Colored Cemetery in Aiken, South Carolina
- Anson Street African Burial Ground in Charleston, South Carolina
- Darlington Memorial Cemetery in Darlington, South Carolina; NRHP-listed
- King Cemetery near Adams Run, South Carolina; NRHP-listed
- Old Pilgrim Baptist Church Cemetery and Kilgore Family Cemetery near Five Forks, South Carolina; NRHP-listed
- Orangeburg City Cemetery in Orangeburg, South Carolina; NRHP-listed
- Randolph Cemetery in Columbia, South Carolina; NRHP-listed
- Remley Point Cemetery in Mount Pleasant, South Carolina; NRHP-listed
- Richland Cemetery in Greenville, South Carolina; NRHP-listed

== Tennessee ==
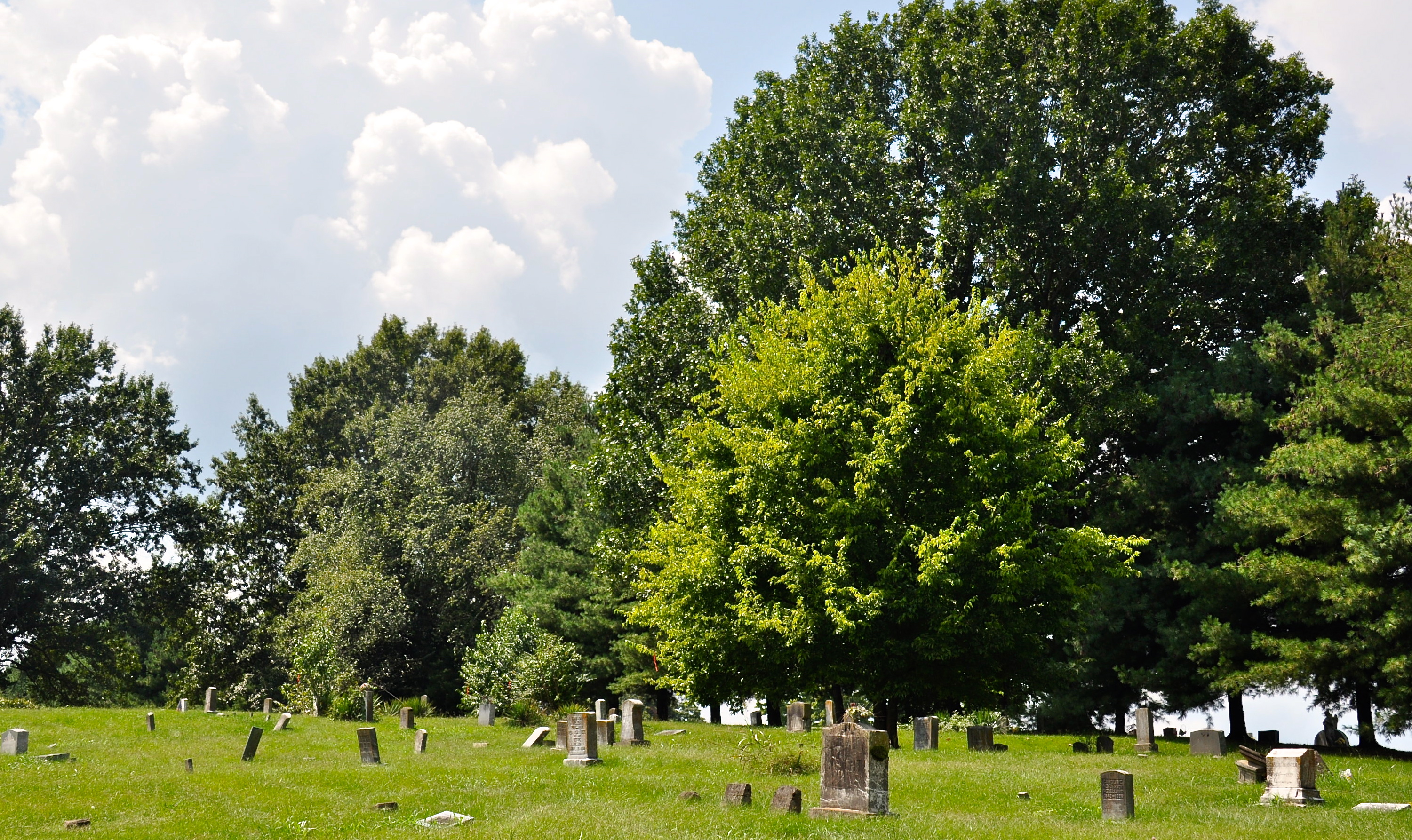
Toussaint L'Ouverture County Cemetery in Franklin, Tennessee

- Evergreen Cemetery in Murfreesboro, Tennessee
- Freedmen's Mission Historic Cemetery in Knoxville, Tennessee; on the campus of Knoxville College
- Greenwood Cemetery in Nashville, Tennessee
- Mount Ararat Cemetery in Nashville, Tennessee
- Nashville City Cemetery in Nashville, Tennessee; NRHP-listed
- Oakland Cemetery in Trenton, Tennessee; NRHP-listed
- Rest Hill Cemetery in Lebanon, Tennessee; NRHP-listed
- Toussaint L'Ouverture County Cemetery in Franklin, Tennessee; NRHP-listed

== Texas ==
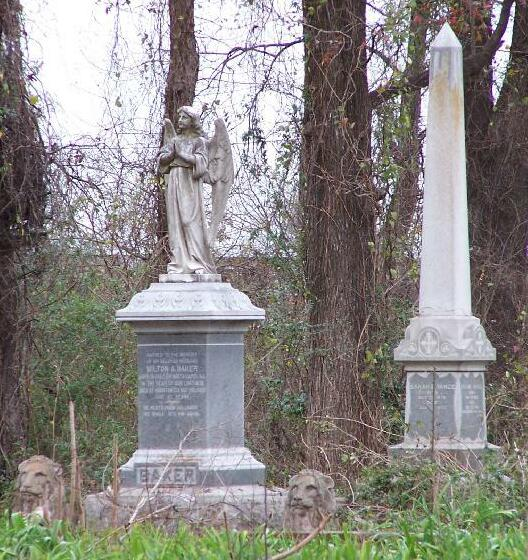
Olivewood Cemetery in Houston, Texas

- Freedman's Cemetery in Dallas, Texas
- Greenwood Cemetery in Waco, Texas
- Humble Negro Cemetery in Humble, Texas
- Olivewood Cemetery in Houston, Texas
- Round Rock Cemetery in Round Rock, Texas

== Virginia ==
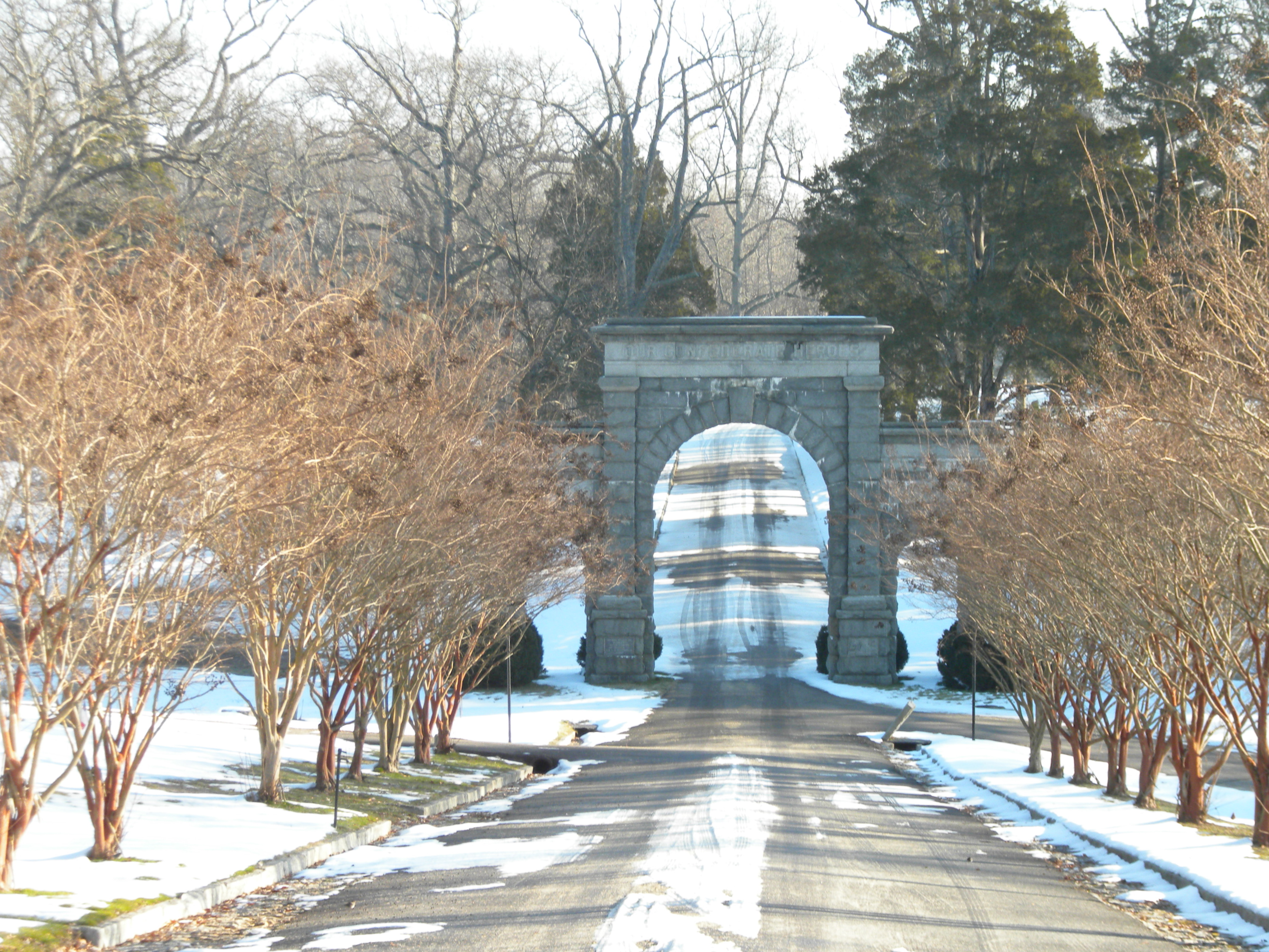
Blandford Cemetery in Petersburg, Virginia

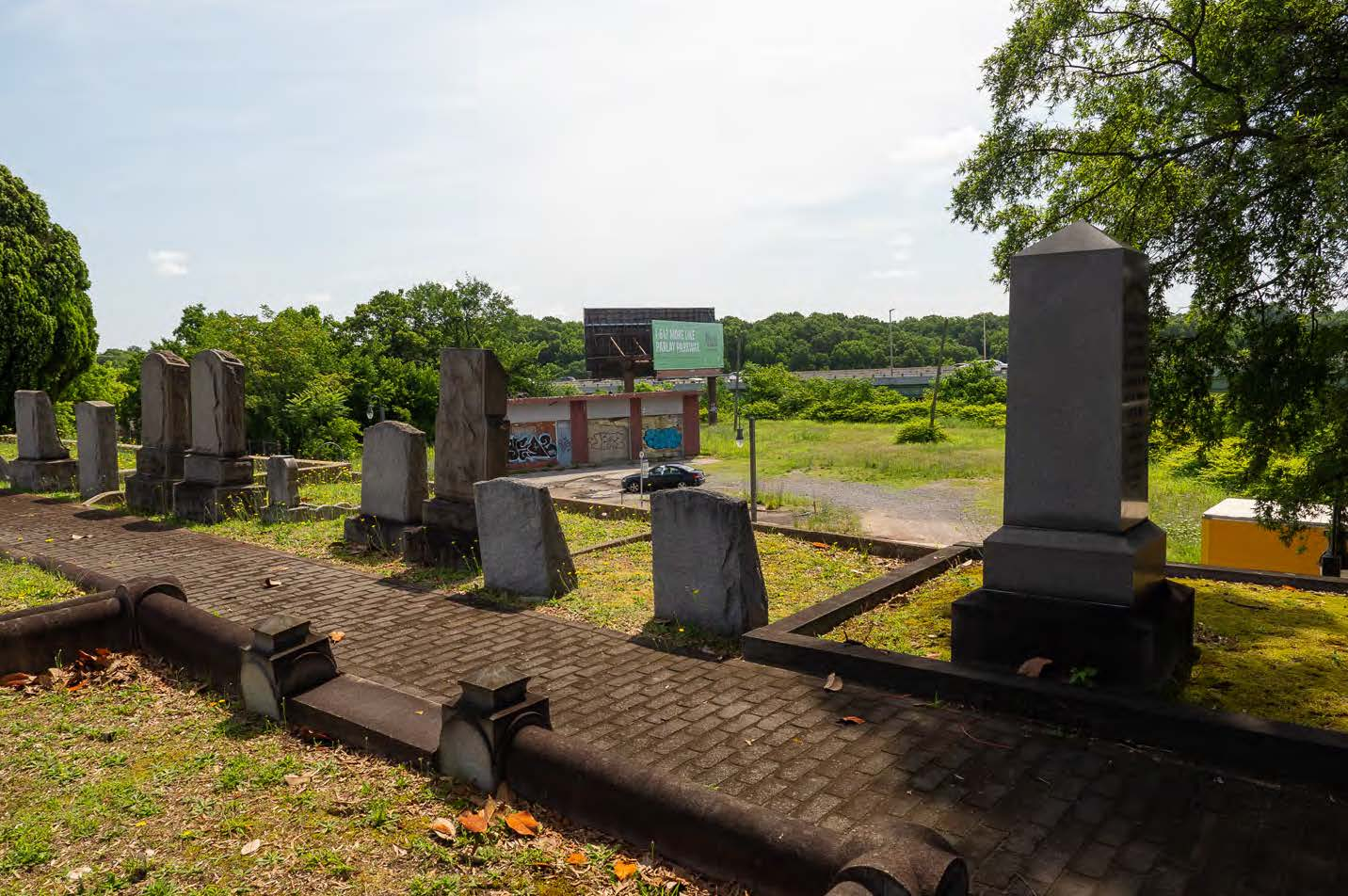
Shockoe Hill African Burying Ground in Richmond, Virginia

- African American Burial Ground in Ashburn, Virginia
- Arlington National Cemetery in Arlington, Virginia
- Barton Heights Cemeteries in Richmond, Virginia; NRHP-listed and VLR-listed, six contiguous historic African-American cemeteries
- Blandford Cemetery in Petersburg, Virginia; NRHP-listed and VLR-listed
- Daughters of Zion Cemetery in Charlottesville, Virginia; NRHP-listed and VLR-listed
- East End Cemetery in Richmond, Virginia
- Evergreen Cemetery in Richmond, Virginia
- Hickory Hill Slave and African American Cemetery in Ashland, Virginia; NRHP-listed and VLR-listed, former plantation site
- Hunting Quarter near Sussex Court House, Virginia; NRHP-listed and VLR-listed, former plantation site
- Laurel Grove Colored School and Church in Franconia, Virginia; former African American church with cemetery
- Monticello Cemetery near Charlottesville, Virginia; NRHP-listed, NHL-listed, and VLR-listed, former plantation site
- Mount Vernon near Alexandria, Virginia; NRHP-listed, NHL-listed, and VLR-listed, former plantation site
- Newtown Cemetery in Harrisonburg, Virginia; NRHP-listed
- Old City Cemetery in Lynchburg, Virginia; NRHP-listed and VLR-listed
- People's Memorial Cemetery in Petersburg, Virginia; NRHP-listed and VLR-listed
- Reynolds Homestead in Critz, Virginia; NRHP-listed, NHL-listed, and VLR-listed, former plantation site
- Roseville Plantation in Aylett, Virginia; NRHP-listed and VLR-listed, former plantation site
- Sharswood Plantation in Gretna, Virginia; former plantation site
- Shockoe Bottom African Burial Ground in Richmond, Virginia
- Shockoe Hill African Burying Ground in Richmond, Virginia
- Shockoe Hill Burying Ground Historic District in Richmond, Virginia; NRHP-listed and VLR-listed
- The Richmond Baptist Church and Burying Ground in Richmond, Virginia
- West Point Cemetery in Norfolk, Virginia
- Woodland Cemetery in Richmond, Virginia

== Washington, D.C. ==
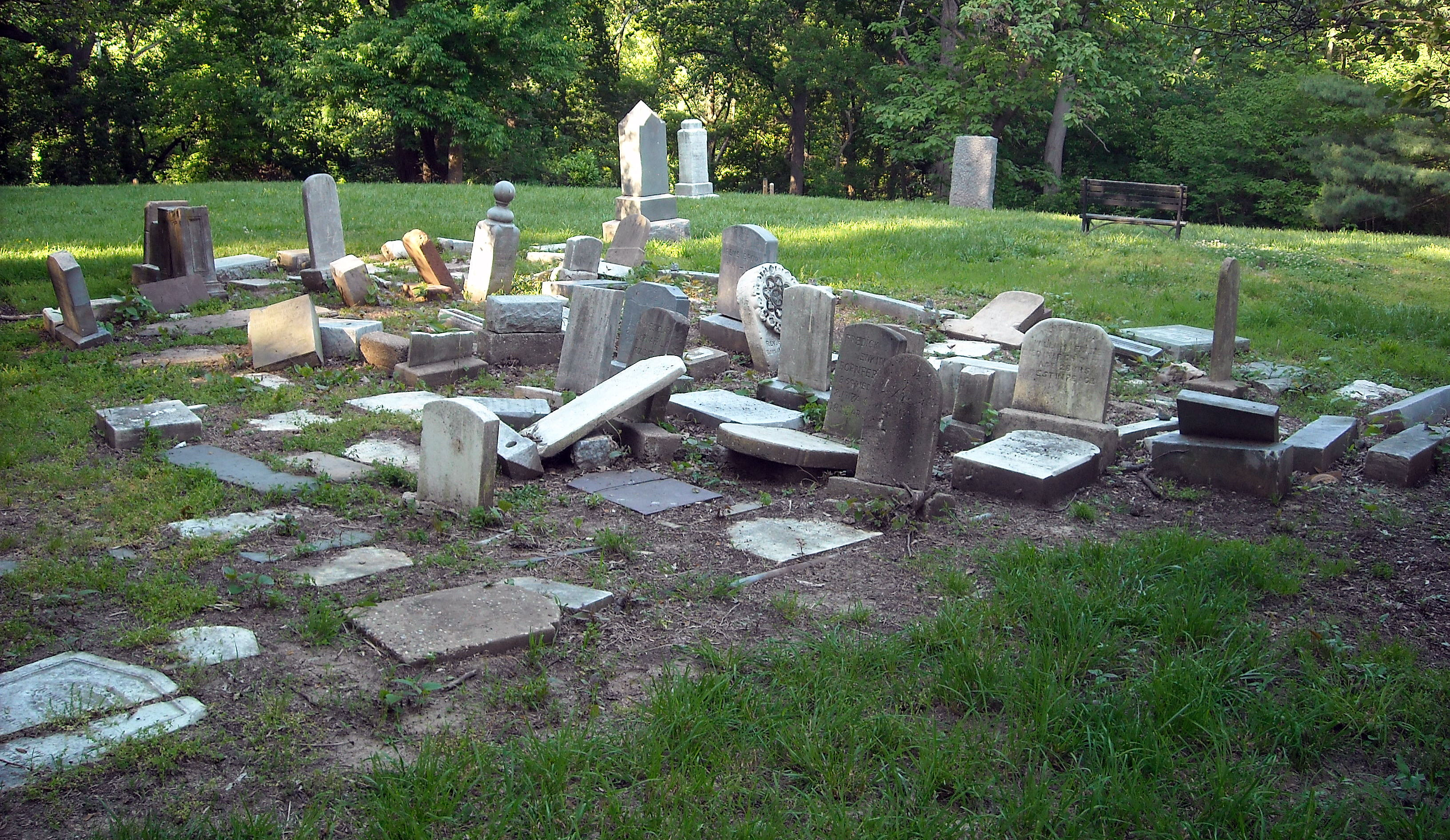
Mount Zion Cemetery in Washington, D.C.

- Columbian Harmony Cemetery
- Graceland Cemetery
- Mount Zion Cemetery
- Woodlawn Cemetery

== West Virginia ==
- Bethel Memorial Park Cemetery in Huntington, West Virginia; NRHP-listed
- James W. Hoge House in Winfield, West Virginia; NRHP-listed, former house
- Mount Pisgah Benevolence Cemetery in Romney, West Virginia
- Wright-Hunter Cemetery in Beckley, West Virginia; NRHP-listed, family burial ground

== See also ==
- List of cemeteries in the United States
- List of rural cemeteries in the United States
- United States National Cemetery System
- African-American Burial Grounds Preservation Act
