= African American cemeteries =

African American cemeteries and burial grounds for African American people in the United States have existed throughout the history of the country.

== History ==
The 1788 doctors' riot occurred in New York City after the digging up graves, many of which were African American burials used for dissection of the bodies by medical students.

As racial segregation was the normal in the late 19th century, African Americans were forced to create their own burial grounds, often on the outside of towns or outside of legally defined town limits. However many African American cemeteries were developed before Jim Crow laws in the American South. The African American church had a funerary ritual of grave mounding; a practice which has roots in West Africa. The traditional Southern Folk-style cemeteries are characterized by mounded graves, scraped ground, a hilltop location, east to west grave orientation, grave markers and decorations made by using materials locally available (not commercially sold), certain species of vegetation, the use of grave shelters, and the evidence of a devotion to God and/or family in the form of memorials. One example of this style burials can be found at Basket Creek Cemetery (founded in 1886) near Douglasville in Douglas County, Georgia.

While efforts were introduced as early as 1870 to desegregate cemeteries led by senator Charles Sumner, they were unsuccessful.

These cemeteries, located throughout the United States, have faced decades of neglect as the descendants who originally cared for them have died and the property has been used for development or lost to climate change. Other cemeteries were only discovered when development and new construction was occurring. Some have further been lost to poor record keeping.

Some of these cemeteries which had been mapped no longer appear on maps in places such as Texas along the Mexico and Louisiana borders, a further symptom of the structural racism which is contributing to their disappearance.

The Black Cemetery Network was established in 2021 to provide an archive and map of black cemeteries, led by Antoinette Jackson and the University of South Florida.

The African-American Burial Grounds Preservation Act was signed into law in 2023.

== See also ==
- List of African American cemeteries
- List of cemeteries in the United States
