= Mount Olive-Bedford Chapel Cemetery =

Historic cemetery in Arkansas, United States

- U.S. National Register of Historic Places
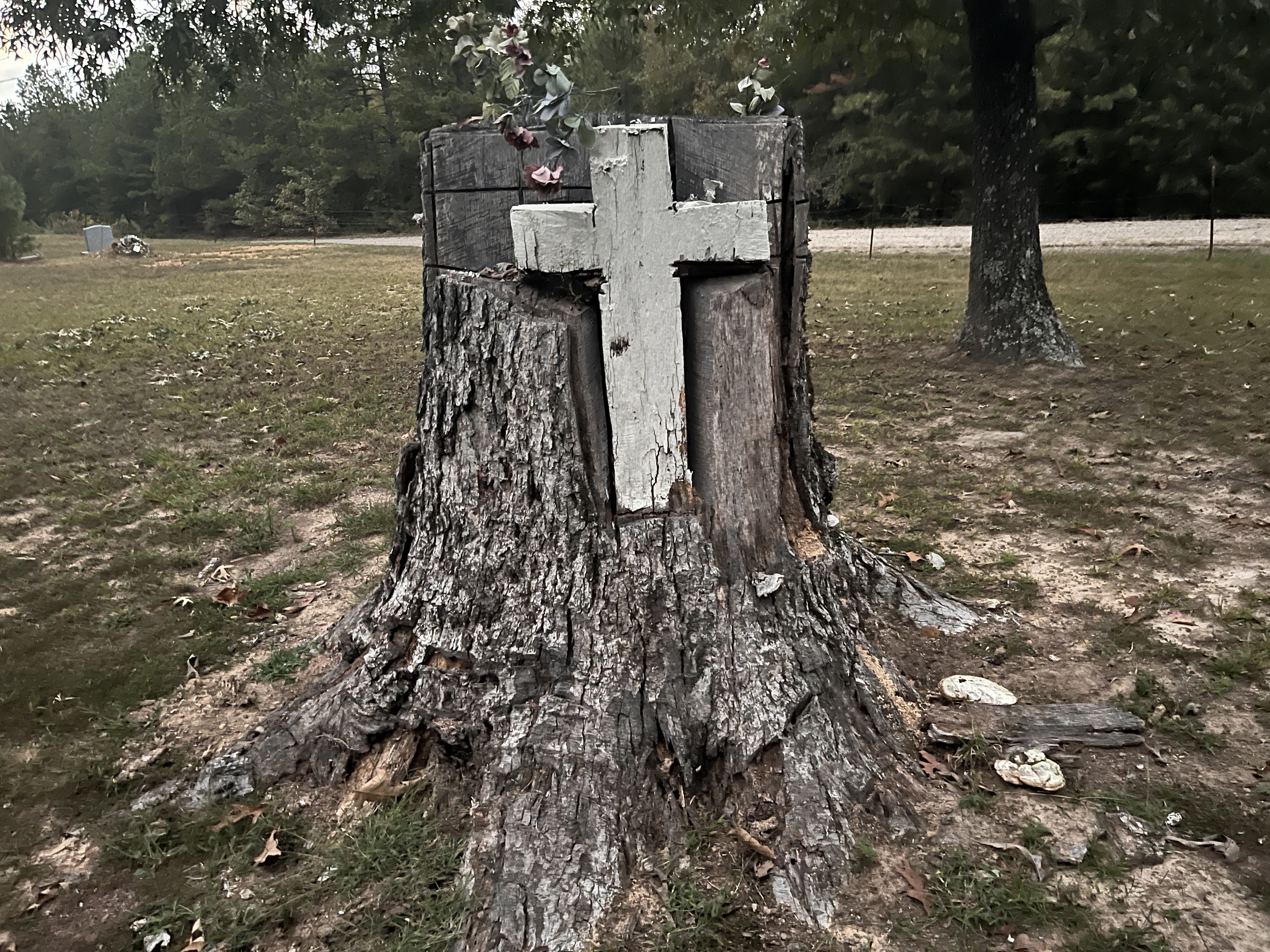

- Location within Arkansas Location within the United States
- Nearest city: Mount Vernon, Arkansas, US
- Coordinates: 35°15′07″N 92°06′03″W
- Area: 1.9 acres (0.77 ha)
- Built: 1839
- NRHP reference No.: 100003997
- Added to NRHP: May 30, 2019

The Mount Olive-Bedford Chapel Cemetery is a historic cemetery in rural White County, Arkansas, United States, northeast of Mount Vernon on Manning Road. It was founded in the 1880s, and is the only surviving remnant of an African-American community called "The Colony". It occupies 1.9 acres (0.77 ha) of basically level ground, and has 86 known burials. Of those, 58 are marked in some way, by some combination of head and foot stones. There are likely more burials on the property. The property includes the Mount Olive Baptist Church, a small clapboarded wood-frame building which has elements dating to the community's founding. The cemetery was listed on the National Register of Historic Places in 2019.

The Colony was established in the years after the American Civil War, when Arkansas experienced an influx of former slaves migrating from states in the Deep South in search of better land and working opportunities. The core of the settlement appears to have been at least in part former slaves of the DuPriest family, which had an extensive plantation. At its height in the 1930s, The Colony had an estimated population of more than 200. The community declined in the following decades, as later generations left for economic opportunities elsewhere. The descendants of families of this community have always known about this location as many of the descendants live in nearby towns such as Conway and Little Rock. In the 1970s the descendants began to have bi-annual reunions at Mt. Olive/Bedford Chapel. The reunions, also known as homecomings are celebrated on the weekend in the summer and end with a church service on Sundays.

== See also ==
- National Register of Historic Places listings in White County, Arkansas
