= Portsmouth African Burying Ground =

Memorial park in New Hampshire, U.S.

Coordinates: 43°4′30″N 70°45′32″W

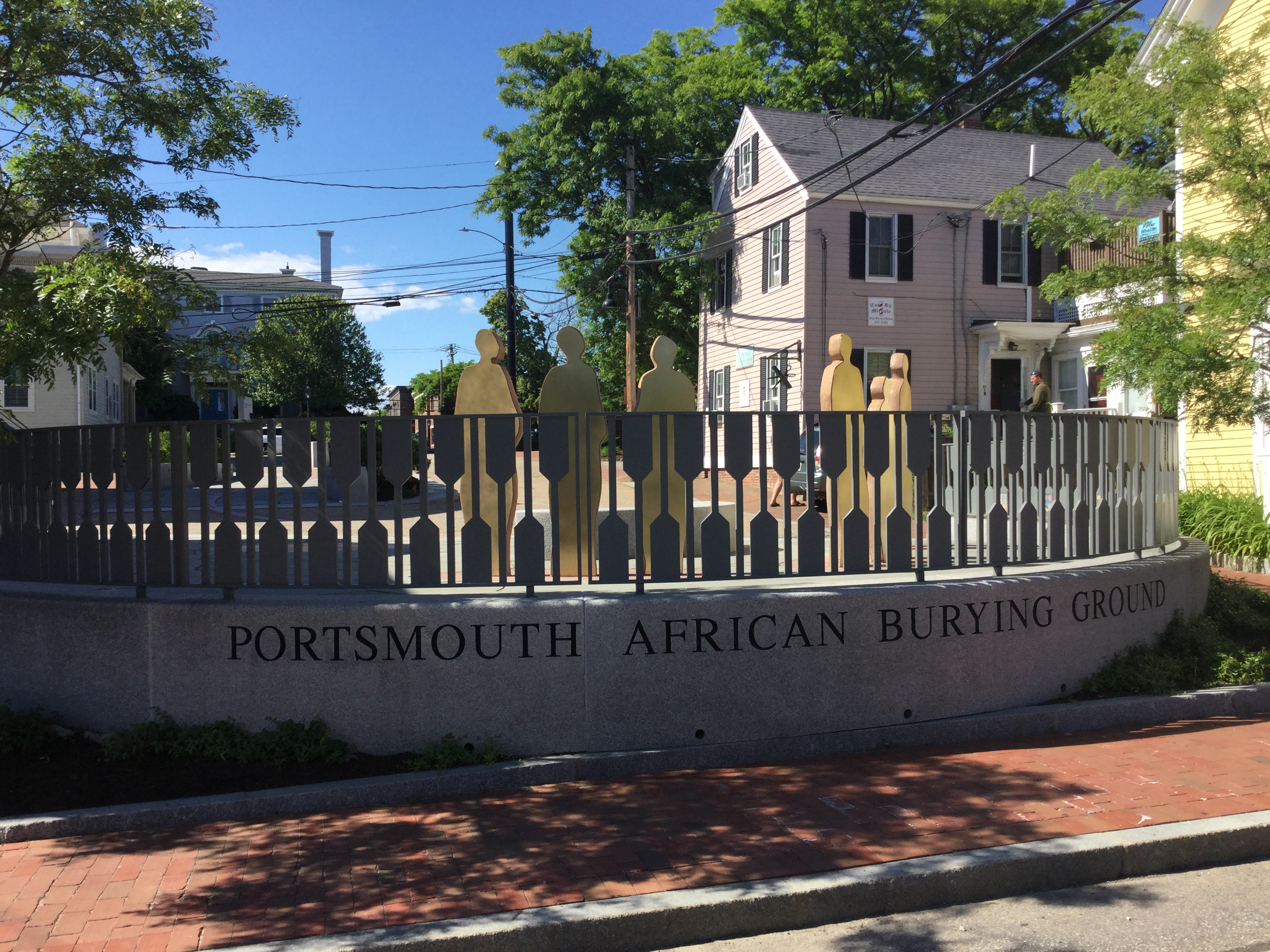
- Portsmouth African Burying Ground Memorial Park
- Interactive map of Portsmouth African Burying Ground

Details
- Established: c. 1705
- Abandoned: c. 1902
- Location: Chestnut Street, Portsmouth, New Hampshire
- No. of graves: 200

The Portsmouth African Burying Ground is a memorial park on Chestnut Street in Portsmouth, New Hampshire, United States. The memorial park sits on top of an 18th-century gravesite containing almost two hundred freed and enslaved African people. It is the only archeologically verified African burying ground for the time period in New England.

The site was discovered in 2003 when construction workers discovered the buried while trying to dig a manhole. Remains of eight individuals were exhumed and determined to be of African descent. Of the eight remains, four were men, one was a female, one a child, and the rest were unable to be determined.

== History ==
Although the exact date of the first burial in the African Burying Ground is unknown, maps dating back to 1705 have included the cemetery. The gravesite went out of use in the late 18th century but was mentioned in a newspaper written sometime in the mid-1800s. Maps of the city continued to include the cemetery until 1902. However years of city advancement; road pavements, sewage construction, and building constructions of the nineteenth and twentieth century led to the site being covered. In 2000, a marker was placed near the cemetery to mark the location of the burying ground along the Black Heritage Trail. In 2003 maintenance workers uncovered the remains of thirteen individuals during routine upkeep. Afterwards, eight individuals were examined by archaeologists, and five grave shaft locations were known, but not unearthed. The remains of those eight individuals were studied by the archaeologists who used DNA testing to prove they were of African descent. In 2004, the Portsmouth City Council created the African Burying Ground Committee with the sole purpose of figuring out how to give a proper tribute to the burying ground. After five years of design, the African Burying Ground Committee submitted a design proposal to the Portsmouth City Council and was approved. Jerome Meadows was chosen by the African Burying Ground Committee to create the memorial park design in 2008. The memorial park was unveiled May 23, 2015 which also marked the date in which those eight exhumed individuals were reburied. In the end, the memorial cost just over $1.1 million which was donated by local citizens, businesses, and the city of Portsmouth itself. On May 23, 2016, the city of Portsmouth held a one-year anniversary for the memorial park and the reburial.

== Memorial Park Information ==
The monument occupies a pedestrian area between State and Court streets and includes:

- Entry Piece with a sculpture of an African woman and an African male slave
- The Petition Line on the ground with words from a 1779 Petition for freedom by twenty slaves from Portsmouth
- Information Marker
- Ceremonial Burial Cover, a circular lid sealing the underground vault where the remains were reinterred
- 8 Community Figures
- Decorative Railing with elements of Kinte cloth motif

== Entry Piece Information ==
The entry piece to the memorial park is located to the North and is a large rectangular cut of granite with two bronze statues on either side. Facing East, towards Africa, he is representative of the first slaves to land in New England. The statue itself is quite big, representative of the mental strength needed after experiencing the slave trade and journey from Africa to New England. He wears a simple pair of pants and shirt, indicative of the labor required of slaves to build the colonial settlements. On the other side of the granite, facing West is an African woman. According to the park artist, Jerome Meadows, she is the portrayal of Mother Africa. She represents the loss of family, friends, and fellow community members separated from each other during the slave trade. She wears a traditional West African dress and headdress that would have been common in her village. Both of the statues have an arm reaching along the granite slab for the other. Their hands do not touch, instead they are inches apart. This is to represent the separation African slaves experienced and would have to experience for over 200 years.

== Images ==
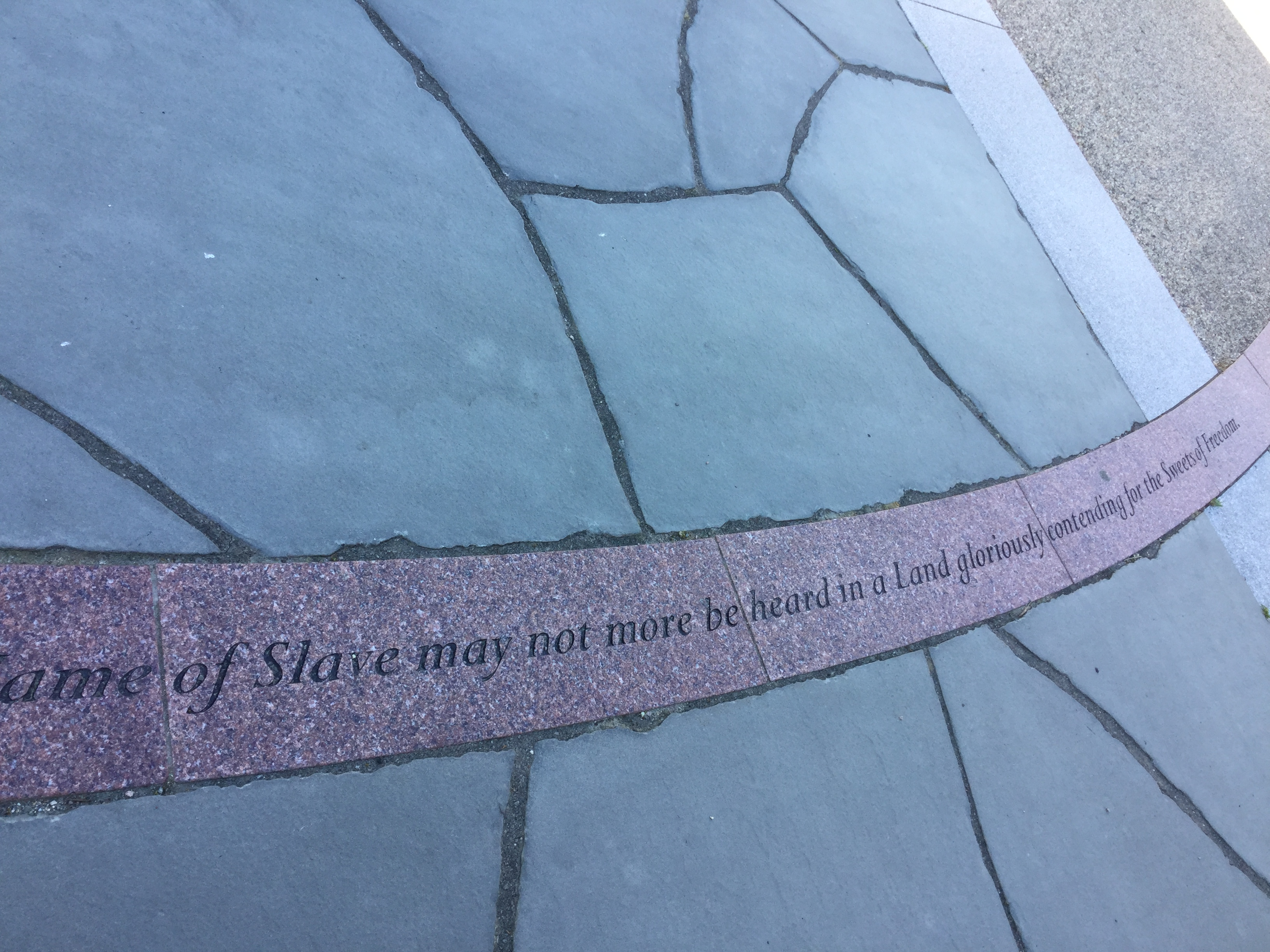
The Petition Line. Portsmouth African Burying Ground Memorial Park

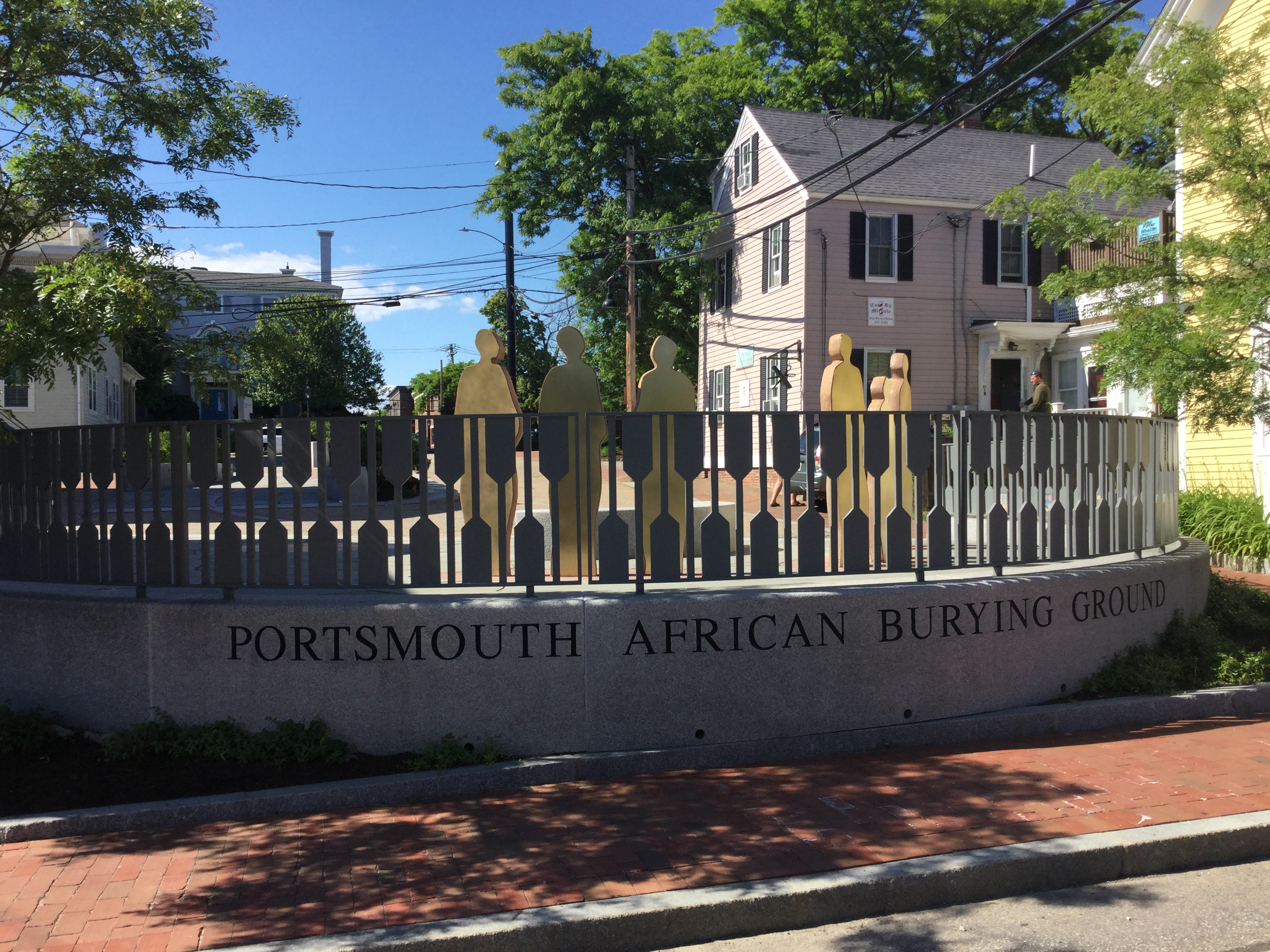
Portsmouth African Burying Ground Memorial Park

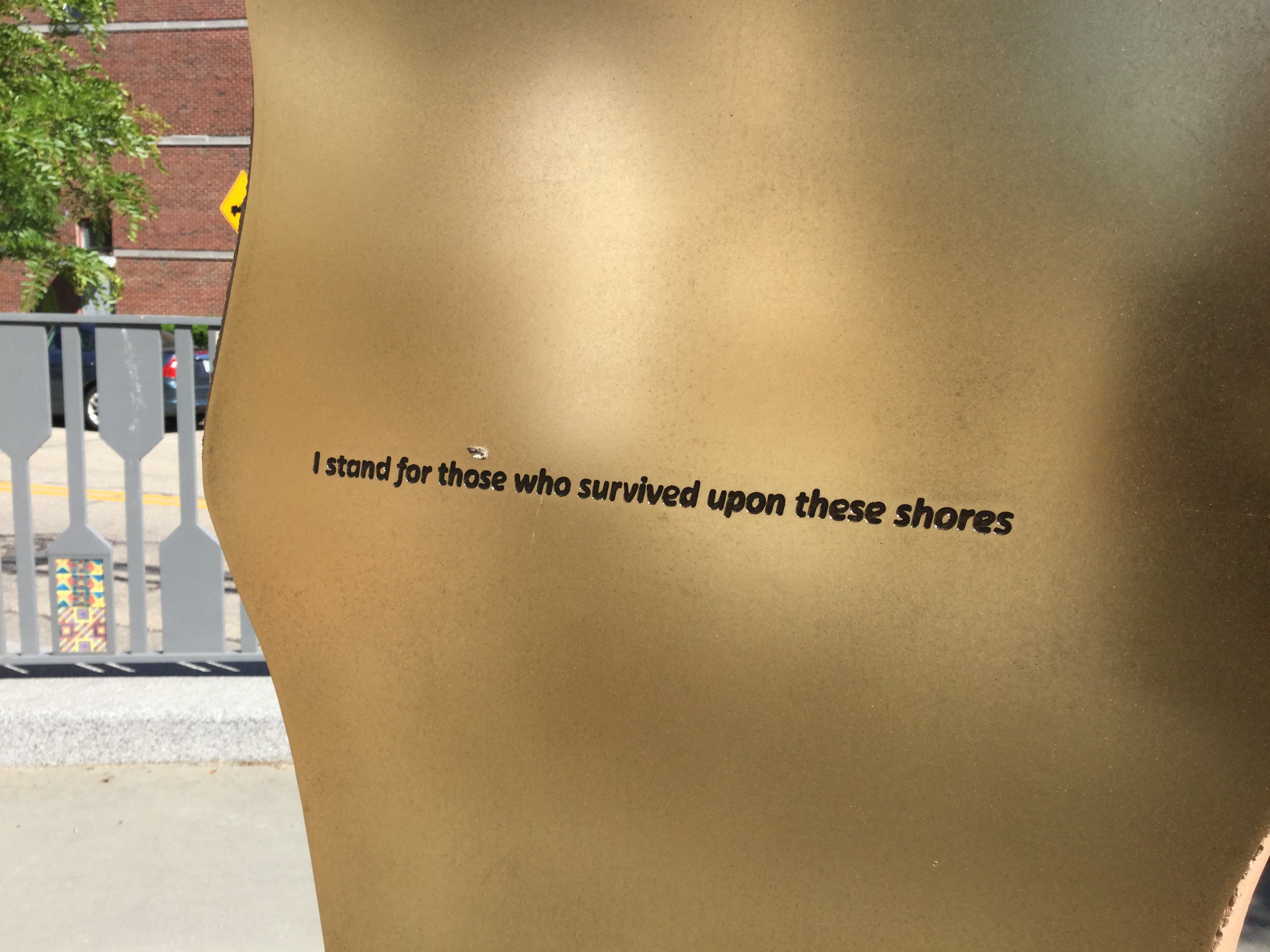
Inscription on a Community Figure. Portsmouth African Burying Ground Memorial Park
