= African Cemetery at Higgs Beach =

1860 cemetery of Africans in Florida, US

- U.S. National Register of Historic Places
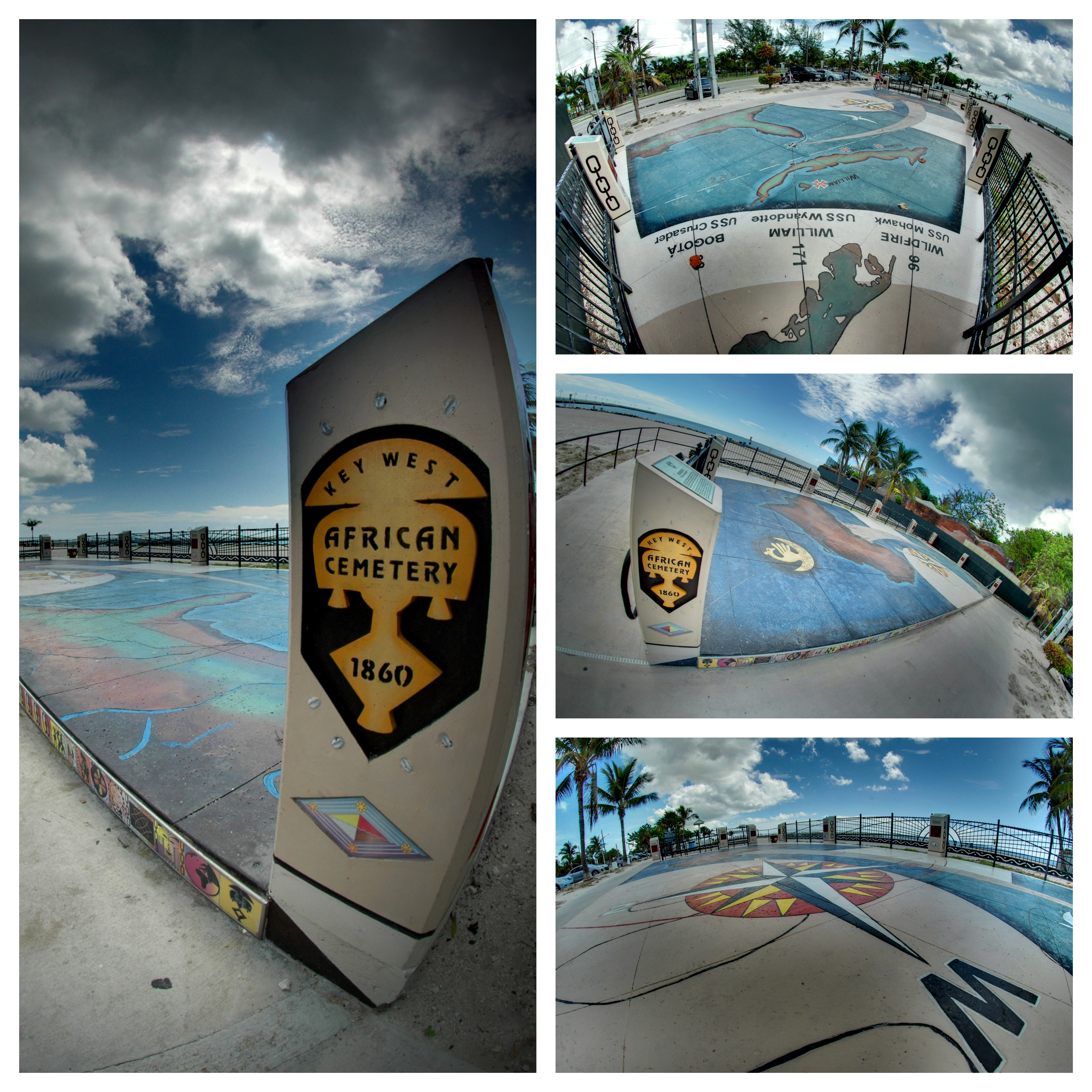

- Location within Florida Location within the United States
- Location: Key West, Florida
- Coordinates: 24.548382°N 81.7864°W
- NRHP reference No.: 12000362
- Added to NRHP: June 26, 2012

The African Cemetery at Higgs Beach is a cemetery in Key West, Florida, where nearly 300 Africans were buried in 1860.

In 1860, the United States Navy intercepted three ships that held 1,432 Africans and were engaging in the illicit slave trade. The Africans were rescued and held in quarantine. During this time, 294 people died and were buried at Higgs Beach. The cemetery was discovered in 2002 using ground-penetrating radar. On June 26, 2012, it was added to the National Register of Historic Places.

== Gallery ==
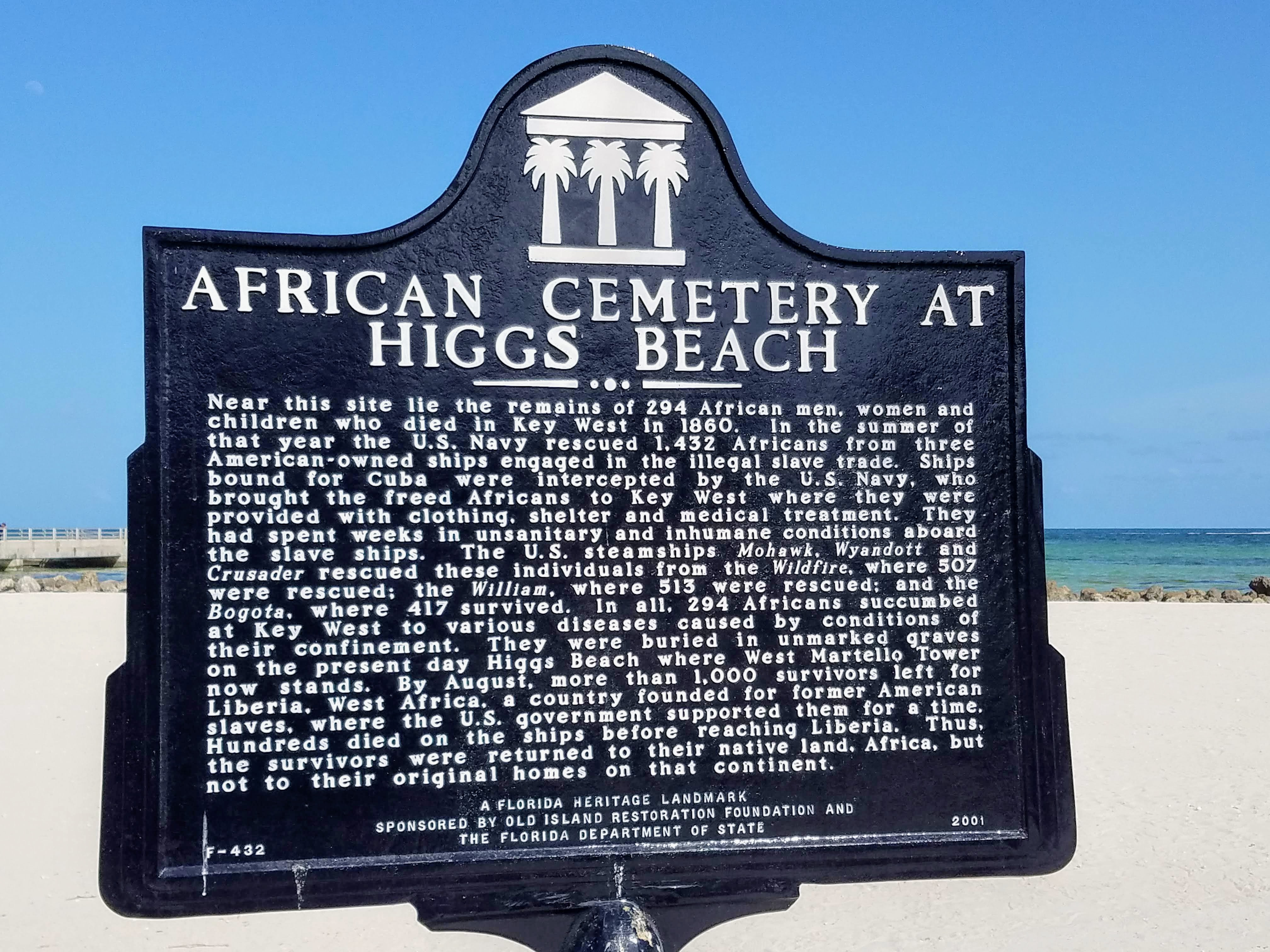
African Cemetery Historic Marker

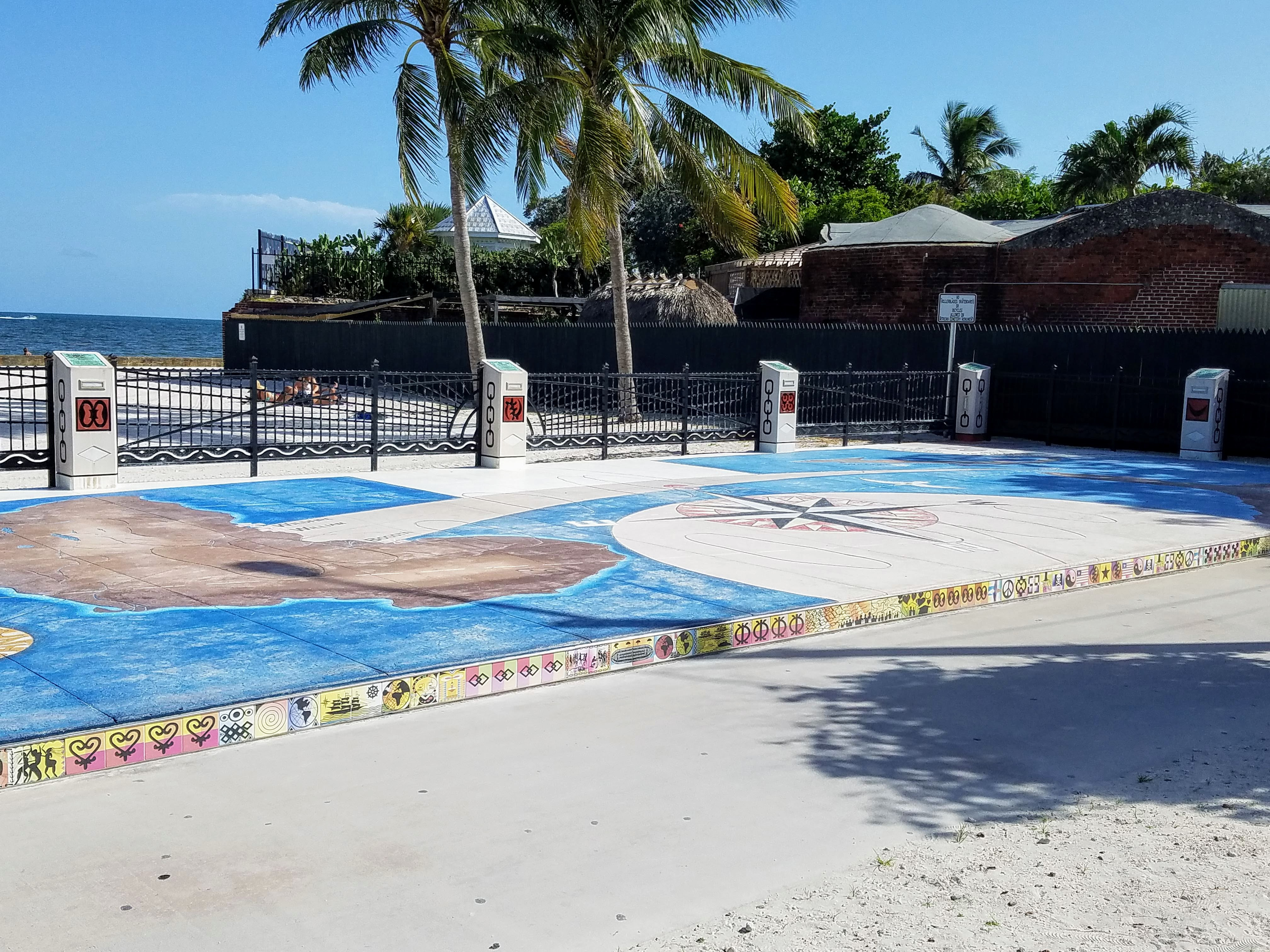
African Cemetery at Higgs Beach - June 2020
