= African-American Burial Grounds Preservation Act =

The African-American Burial Grounds Preservation Act was introduced by North Carolina representative Alma Adams and Ohio senator Sherrod Brown in February 2022 during the 117th Congress and signed into law during the fiscal year 2023 Omnibus Spending Package.

Among the goals of the act is the preservation and protection of long neglected African American cemeteries and addressing the discrepancy in funding for their restoration. Though the African-American Burial Grounds Preservation Act was passed, it has not been funded, and is presently dormant.

== See also ==
- List of African American cemeteries
