= Daughters of Zion Cemetery =

Historic cemetery in Virginia, United States

- U.S. National Register of Historic Places
- Virginia Landmarks Register
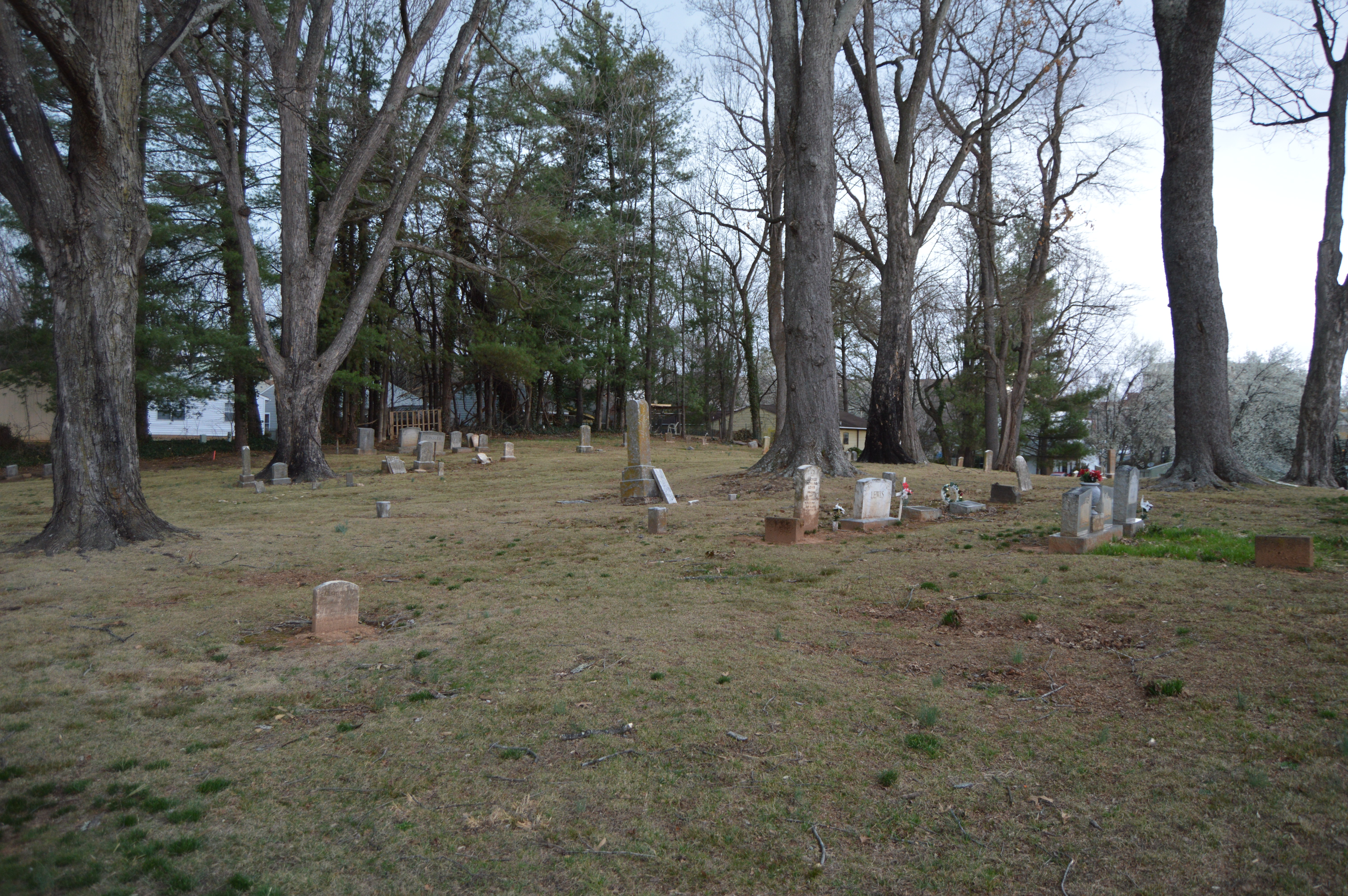
- Southwestern quadrant

- Location within Virginia Location within the United States
- Location: Corner of First and Oak Sts, Charlottesville, Virginia
- Coordinates: 38°1′34″N 78°29′03″W
- Area: 2 acres (0.81 ha)
- Built: 1873
- Architectural style: Cemetery
- NRHP reference No.: 10000382
- VLR No.: 104-5153

Significant dates
- Added to NRHP: June 24, 2010
- Designated VLR: March 18, 2010

Daughters of Zion Cemetery, also known as Zion Cemetery, Society Cemetery, and Old Oakwood Section, is a historic African-American cemetery located at Charlottesville, Virginia, United States. It was established in 1873, and contains an estimated 300 burial sites with 152 of the burials commemorated with 136 surviving grave markers. It consists exclusively of marble and granite grave markers with a single 20 foot by 20 foot section enclosed with a cast-iron fence. Notable burials include Benjamin Tonsler (1854–1917), who built the Benjamin Tonsler House. The city assumed title to the property in the 1970s, and the last burial occurred in 1995.

It was listed on the National Register of Historic Places in 2010.
