= Remley Point Cemetery =

Historic cemetery in Charleston County, South Carolina

- U.S. National Register of Historic Places
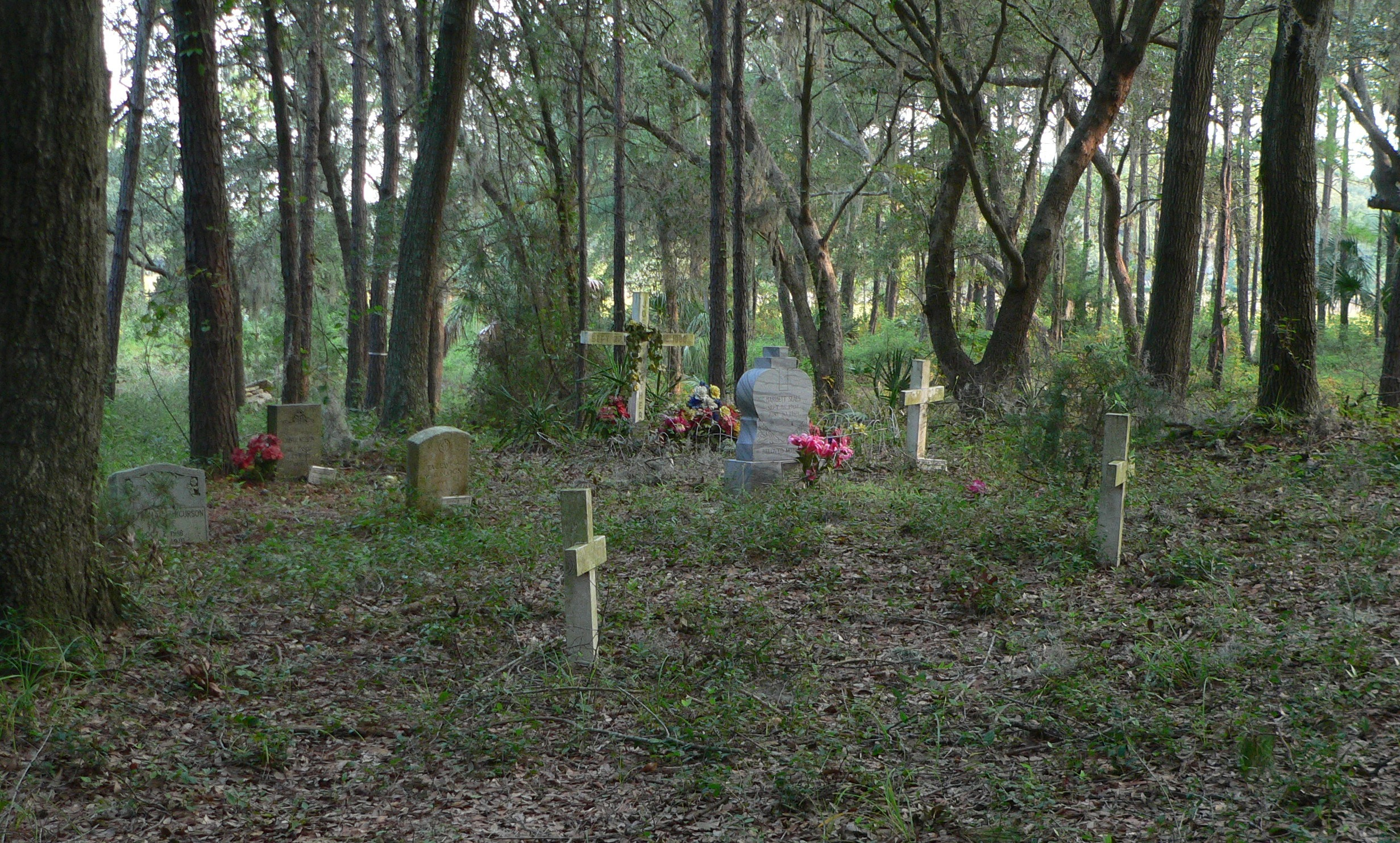

- Location within South Carolina Location within the United States
- Location: 0 4th Street, Mt. Pleasant, SC 29464
- Coordinates: 32°48′47″N 79°53′55″W
- Area: 2.32 acres (0.94 ha)
- Built: c. 1867
- NRHP reference No.: 02000570
- Added to NRHP: May 30, 2002

Remley Point Cemetery (also known as Scanlonville Cemetery) is a cemetery located in the Scanlonville community in Mt. Pleasant, South Carolina. It contains 41 marked graves ranging from 1867 to 1989, but residents claim there may be over 1,000 people, largely African American, buried there. It was added to the National Register of Historic Places in 2002.

In 1999, the 3-acre cemetery was purchased by Tom and Victoria Rogers, who planned to use the property as part of a larger homestead. In 2001, the Rogers filed to relocate the graves so that they could build their home, but withdrew the request when residents of Scanlonville sued to block the relocation. Following a renewal of that request, in 2005 a judge ruled that the historical cemetery could not be developed.
