= Belding-Gaines Cemetery =

Historic cemetery in Arkansas, United States

- U.S. National Register of Historic Places
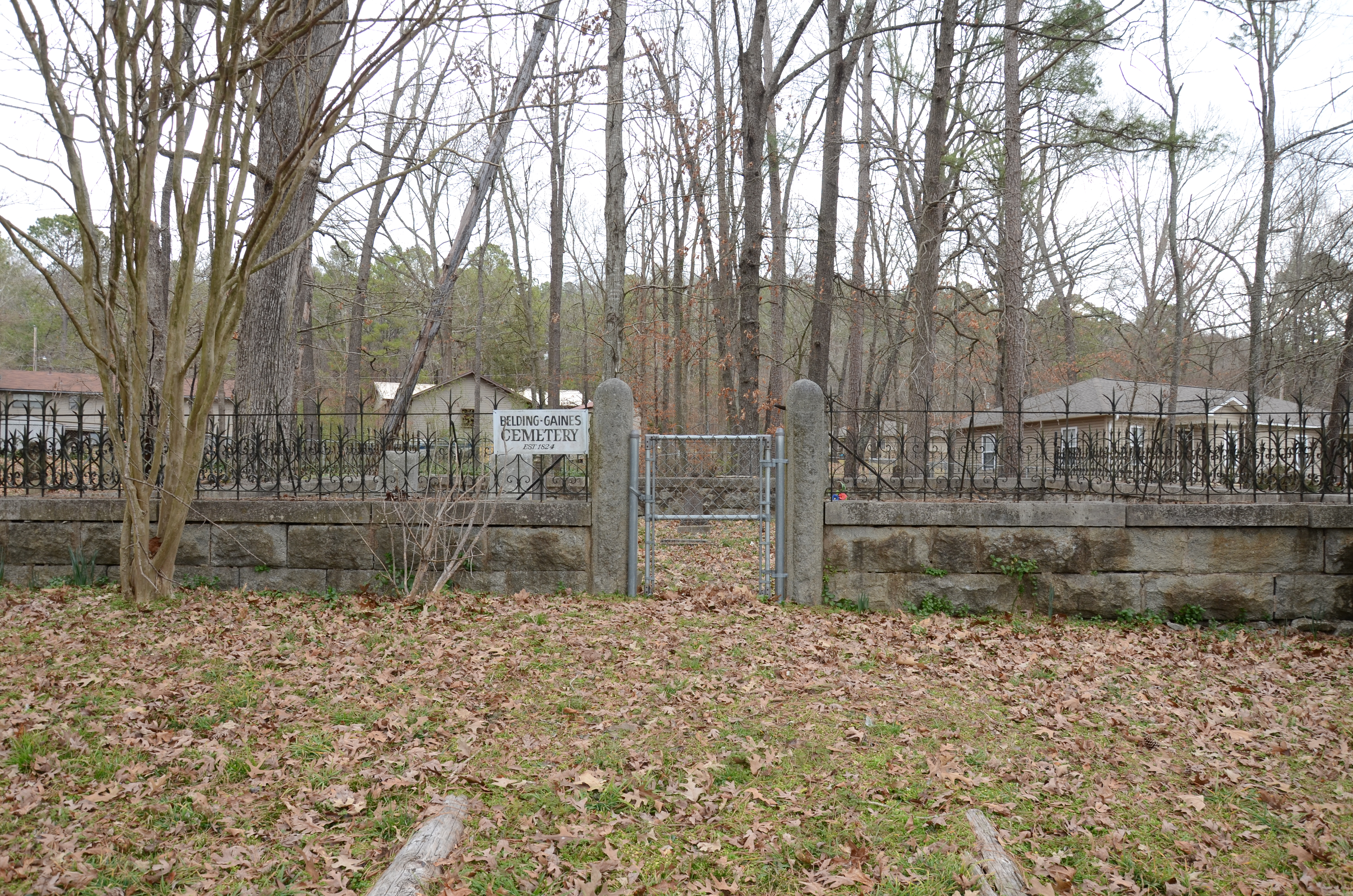

- Location within Arkansas Location within the United States
- Nearest city: Hot Springs, Arkansas
- Coordinates: 34°28′6″N 92°58′45″W
- Area: 1 acre (0.40 ha)
- NRHP reference No.: 93000089
- Added to NRHP: February 25, 1993

The Belding-Gaines Cemetery is a historic cemetery in Garland County, Arkansas, also referred to as Bassett-Belding-Gaines Cemetery. Set on the north side of United States Route 270, the cemetery is about 5.3 miles (8.5 km) east of downtown Hot Springs. The small, wooded lot, about 1 acre (0.40 ha) in size, contains twenty marked graves from the 19th century, and reported unmarked graves.

== Families ==
The marked graves are divided into four distinct family groups: the Bassett family group, the Belding and Gaines group, and the Simpson group. The Simpson group is believed to include a significant number of burials of enslaved people of African descent. Burials at the cemetery include those of some of the area's earliest settlers of European descent, including Ludovicus Belding and William H. Gaines.

The cemetery was listed on the National Register of Historic Places in 1993.

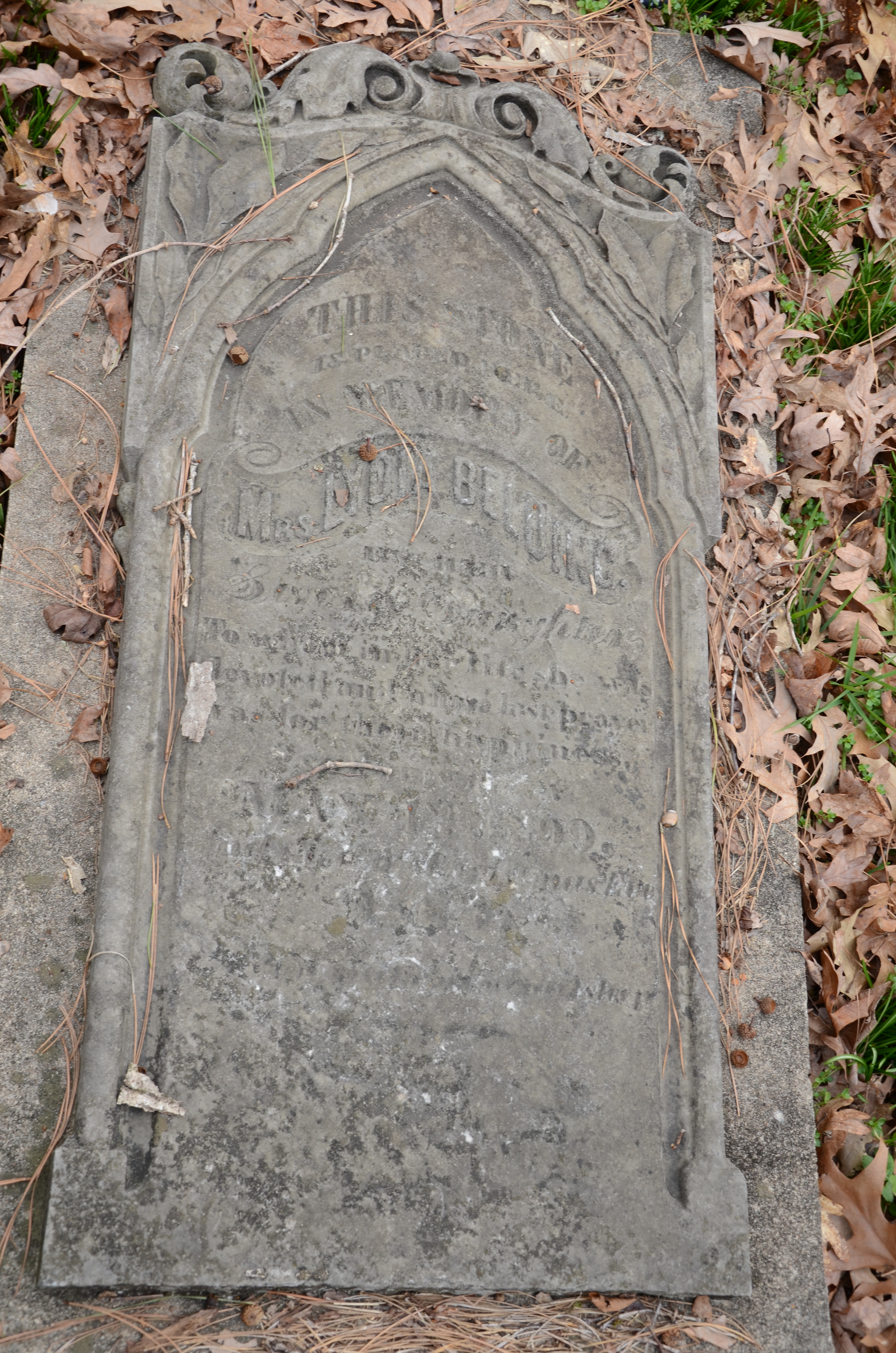
Belding grave marker

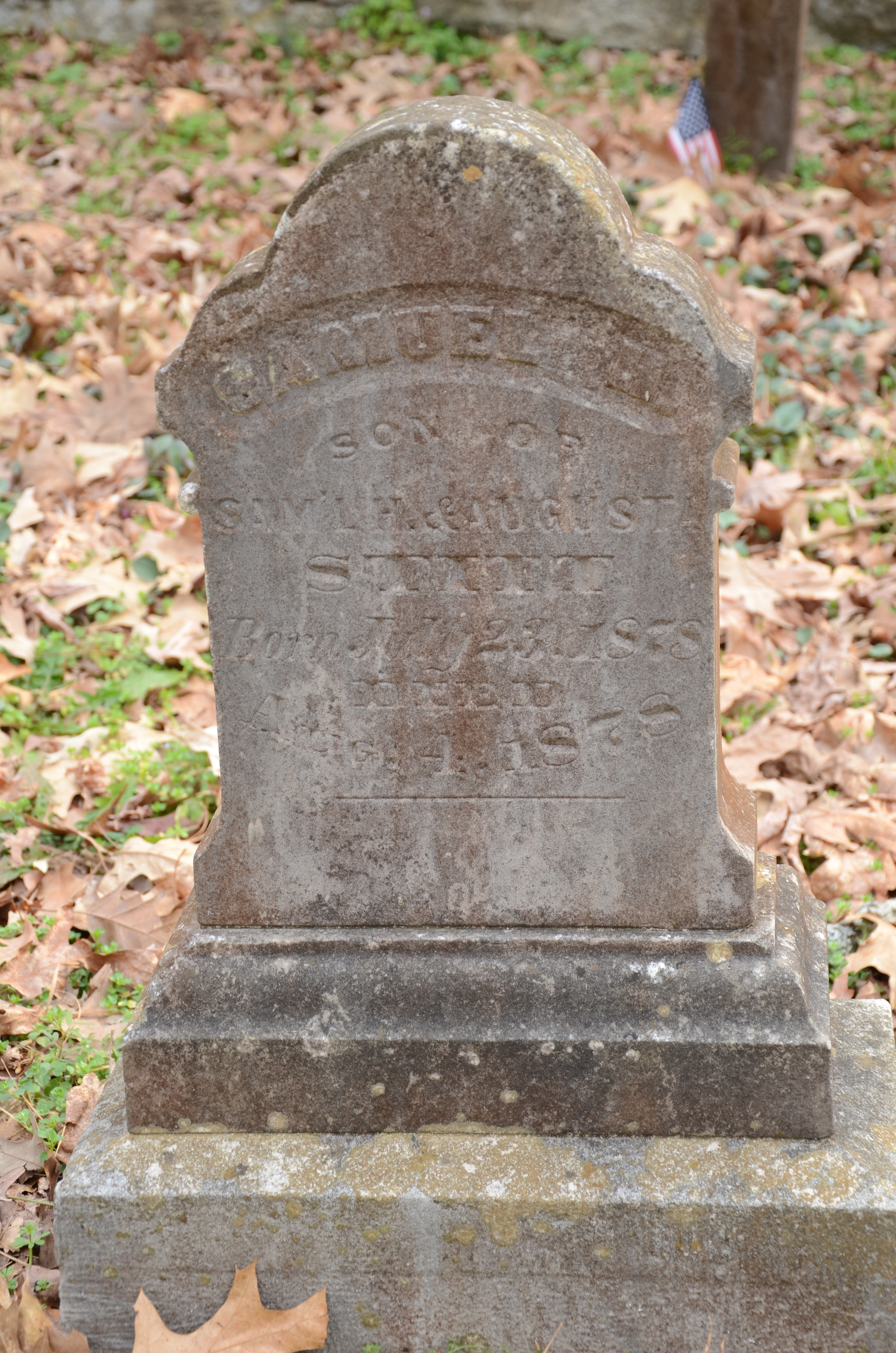
Headstone from 1878

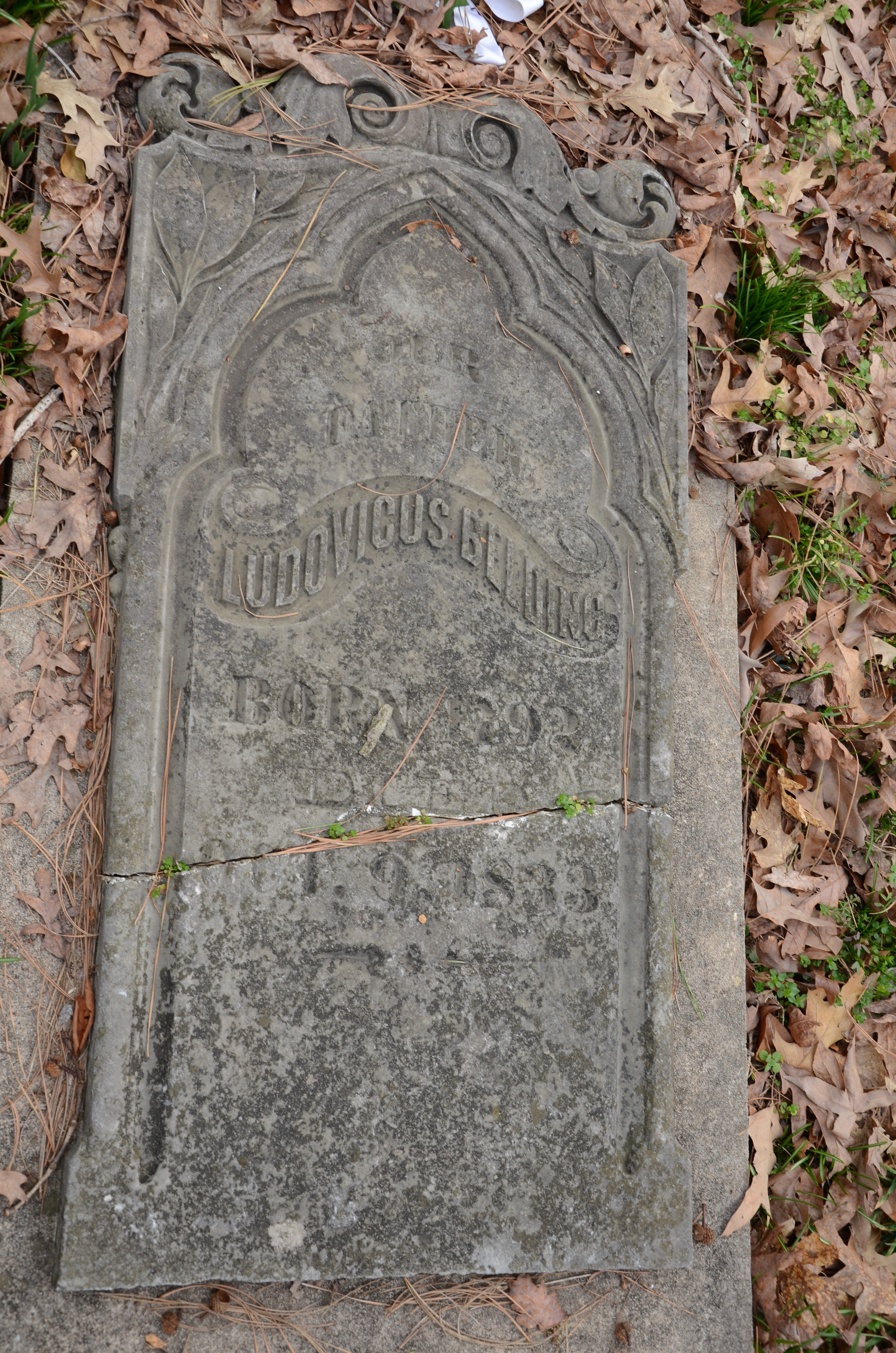
Ludovicus Belding grave marker

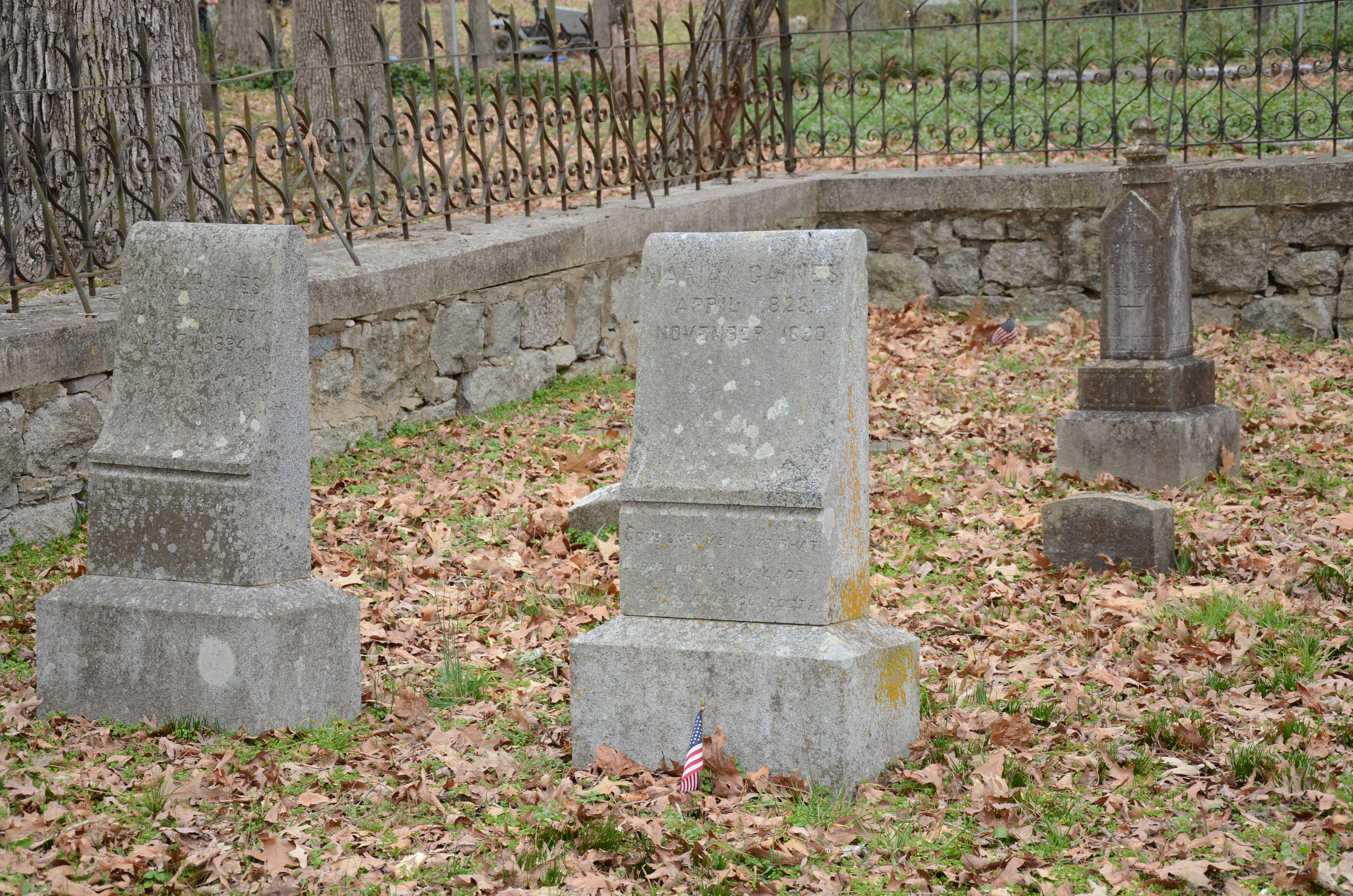
Headstones

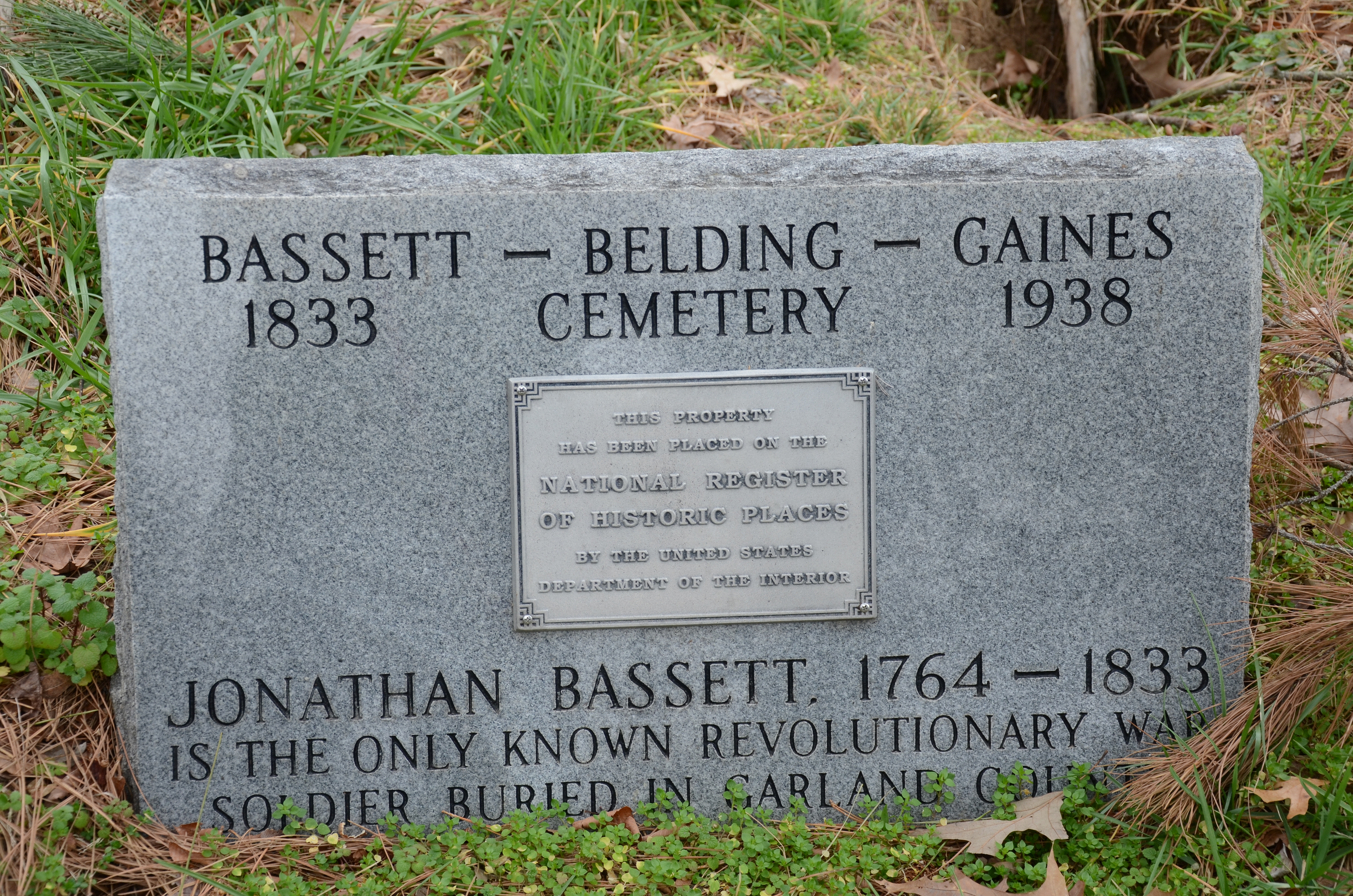
National Register of Historic Places marker and headstone

== See also ==
- National Register of Historic Places listings in Garland County, Arkansas
