= Old Center Burying Yard =

Historic cemetery in Connecticut

- U.S. National Register of Historic Places
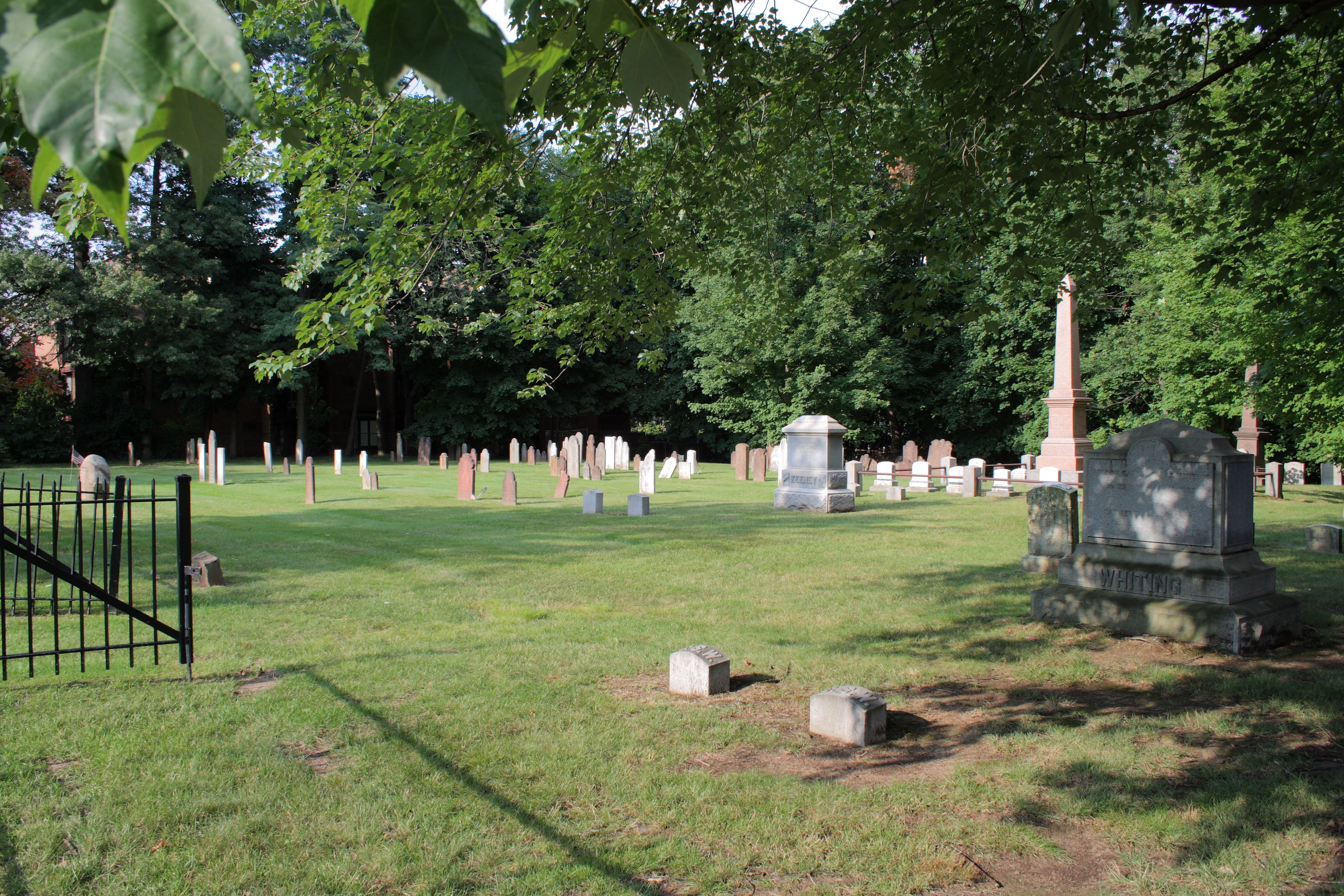

- Location within Connecticut Location within the United States
- Location: 30 North Main Street, West Hartford, Connecticut
- Coordinates: 41°45′58″N 72°44′30″W
- Area: 1 acre (0.40 ha)
- Built: 1719
- NRHP reference No.: 02000421
- Added to NRHP: May 3, 2002

The Old Center Burying Yard or Center Cemetery is a historic cemetery at 30 North Main Street in West Hartford, Connecticut. Established in 1719, it was the town's first cemetery, and its only burying ground for about seventy years. Many of West Hartford's prominent early settlers are buried here, including Noah Webster Sr. and his wife Mercy (parents to the more famous Noah Webster). The oldest portion of the cemetery remained in regular use until 1868, with the last documented burial in its newer section in 1971. It was listed on the National Register of Historic Places in 2002.

== Description and history ==
West Hartford's Old Center Burying Yard is located north of its commercial center area, on the East Side of North Main Street. It is a roughly rectangular cemetery, bounded on three sides by chain-link fencing, and on the street-facing west side by a lower iron fence. The terrain is generally flat and consists of a grassy area dotted with mature trees. It has about 155 marked graves, the oldest of which date to 1722. In addition to the Webster family, notable burials include Bristol, a well-documented former slave who died in 1814.

West Hartford was at first established as a separate parish of Hartford in 1713, having first been settled in 1679. Its early deceased were most likely buried in Hartford's Ancient Burying Ground. In 1719 John Janes sold the town a parcel of land that now makes up the northern two-thirds of this cemetery. This land served as the community's only burying ground until 1790. It was enlarged to its present size in the early 19th century by the acquisition of the formerly private Whitman family cemetery.

== See also ==
- National Register of Historic Places listings in West Hartford, Connecticut
