= List of cemeteries in Alabama =

This list of cemeteries in Alabama includes currently operating, historical (closed for new interments), and defunct (graves abandoned or removed) cemeteries, columbaria, and mausolea which are historical and/or notable. It does not include pet cemeteries.

== Autauga County ==
- Daniel Pratt Cemetery, Prattville; NRHP-listed

== Barbour County ==
- Shorter Cemetery, Eufaula

== Bibb County ==
- Blocton Italian Catholic Cemetery, West Blocton

== Calhoun County ==
- Hillside Cemetery, Anniston; NRHP-listed

== Clarke County ==
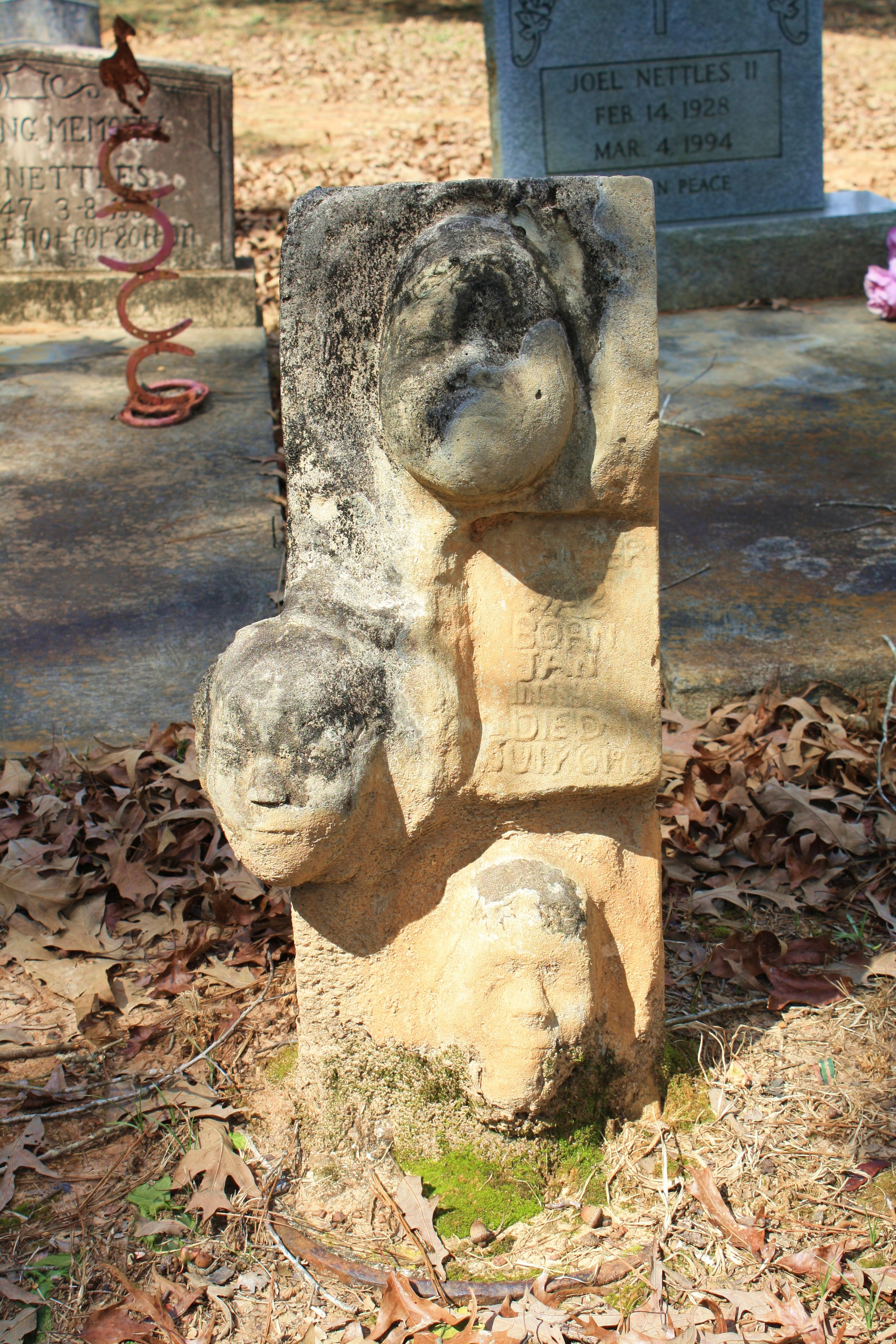
Isaac Nettles Gravestones (c. 1930s–1940s), found in Mount Nebo Cemetery near Carlton, Clarke County

- Airmount Grave Shelter, near Thomasville; NRHP-listed
- Mount Nebo Cemetery, near Carlton

== Dallas County ==
- Old Live Oak Cemetery, Selma

== Jefferson County ==
- Elmwood Cemetery, Birmingham
- Highland Memorial Gardens, Bessemer
- Oak Hill Cemetery, Birmingham; NRHP-listed
- Zion Memorial Gardens, Birmingham

== Lauderdale County ==
- Forks of Cypress Cemetery, near Florence; NRHP-listed

== Limestone County ==
- Glenwood Cemetery, Huntsville
- Maple Hill Cemetery, Huntsville; NRHP-listed

== Macon County ==
- Tuskegee University Campus Cemetery, Tuskegee University, Tuskegee

== Madison County ==
- Mount Paran Cemetery, New Market; NHRP-listed
- Redstone Arsenal cemeteries, Redstone Arsenal

== Mobile County ==
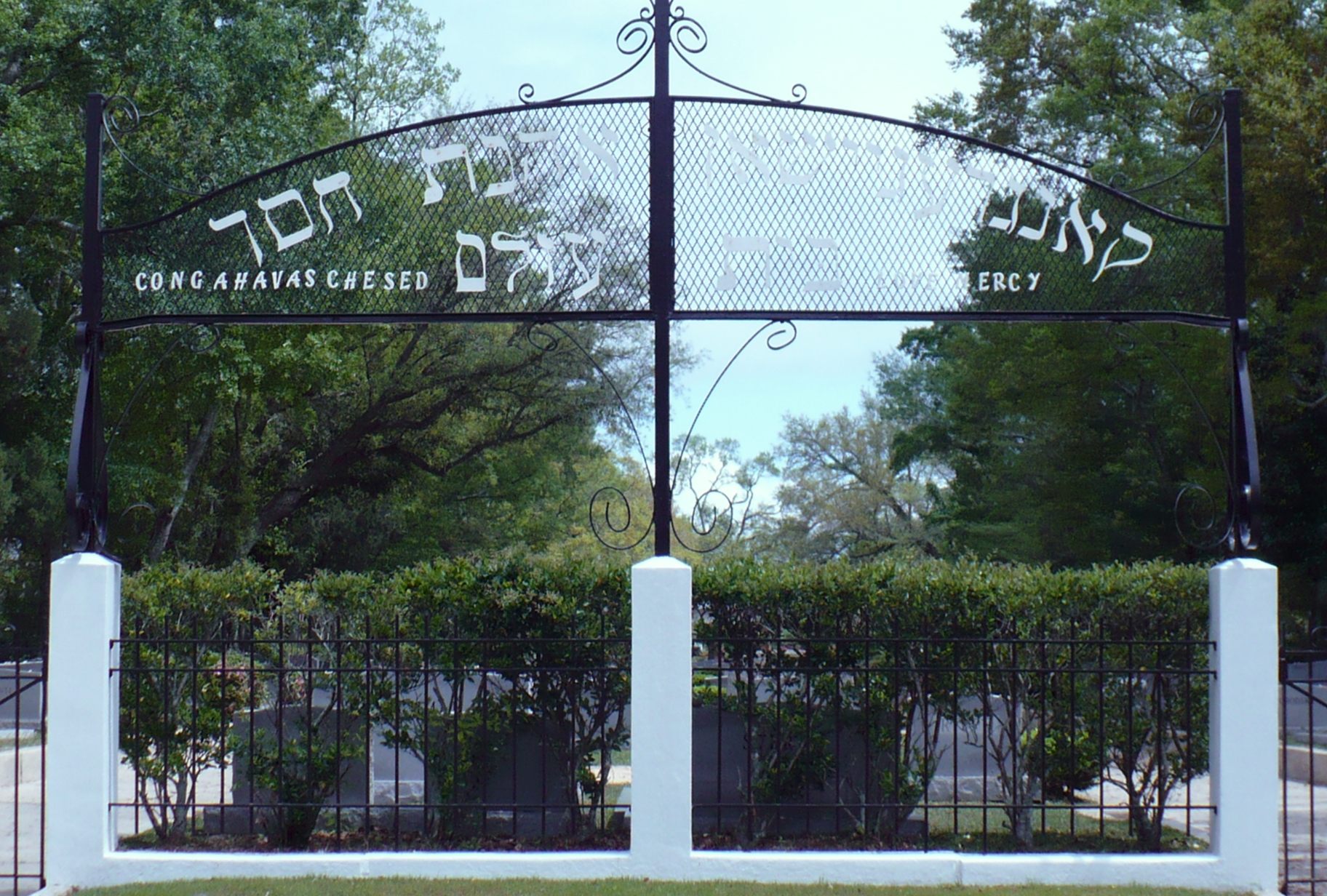
Gate at Ahavas Chesed Cemetery in Mobile, Mobile County

- Ahavas Chesed Cemetery, Mobile
- Catholic Cemetery, Mobile
- Church Street Graveyard, Mobile
- Magnolia Cemetery, Mobile; NRHP-listed
- Mobile National Cemetery, Mobile; NRHP-listed
- Sha'arai Shomayim Cemetery, Mobile

== Montgomery County ==
- Antioch Baptist Church, Mount Meigs
- Greenwood Cemetery, Montgomery

== Russell County ==
- Fort Mitchell National Cemetery, Fort Mitchell

== Shelby County ==
- Alabama National Cemetery, Montevallo

== Tuscaloosa County ==
- Cedar Oak Memorial Park, Tuscaloosa
- Greenwood Cemetery, Tuscaloosa

== See also ==
- List of cemeteries in the United States
- Pioneer cemetery
