= John New =

John New may refer to:

- John C. New (1831–1906), Treasurer of the United States, 1875–76
- John D. New (1924–1944), U.S. Medal of Honor recipient
