= Alabama National Cemetery =

Veterans cemetery in Shelby County, Alabama

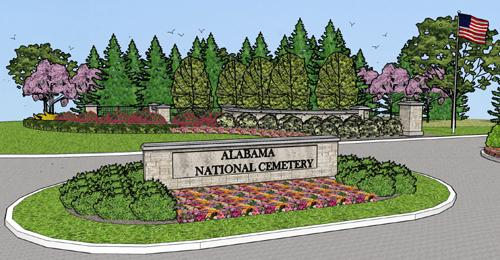
- Artist conception for the entrance at Alabama National Cemetery
- Interactive map of Alabama National Cemetery

Details
- Established: 2009
- Location: 3133 Highway 119 Montevallo, Alabama
- Country: United States
- Coordinates: 33°07′57″N 86°50′14″W
- Type: Public
- Owned by: United States Department of Veterans Affairs
- Size: 479 acres (194 ha)
- No. of graves: >9,000
- Website: Official website
- Find a Grave: Alabama National Cemetery

Alabama National Cemetery is a United States National Cemetery located in Montevallo, Alabama, about 35 miles south of Birmingham. It encompasses 479 acres (194 ha), and should serve veterans' needs for at least the next 50 years. Interments began on June 25, 2009.

== History ==
The Mobile National Cemetery was closed to interments in the 1990s. The other Alabama site is Fort Mitchell National Cemetery near Phenix City, 150 miles southeast. The Veterans Administration was authorized to establish six new burial sites by the National Cemetery Act of 2003. Areas not served by an existing National Cemetery and containing at least 170,000 veteran residents included Bakersfield, California; Birmingham, Alabama; Jacksonville, Florida; Sarasota County, Florida; Philadelphia metropolitan area and Columbia- Greenville, South Carolina.

In July 2007, the U.S. Department of Veterans Affairs purchased the Alabama National Cemetery site for approximately $8 million and awarded a contract in September 2007 to Civil Consultants, Inc. to design the new cemetery.

== Site status ==
Initial construction began in November 2008 and created space for 1,000 casket burials and 1,000 in-ground cremations. Except for minor irrigation work, construction was completed in early June 2009. The grounds were consecrated June 18, 2009, one week before burials were scheduled to commence. A second construction stage was scheduled to start in late 2009 and include an additional 8,100 casket sites, 2,100 in-ground/above-ground cremation sites and 2,700 columbarium niches.

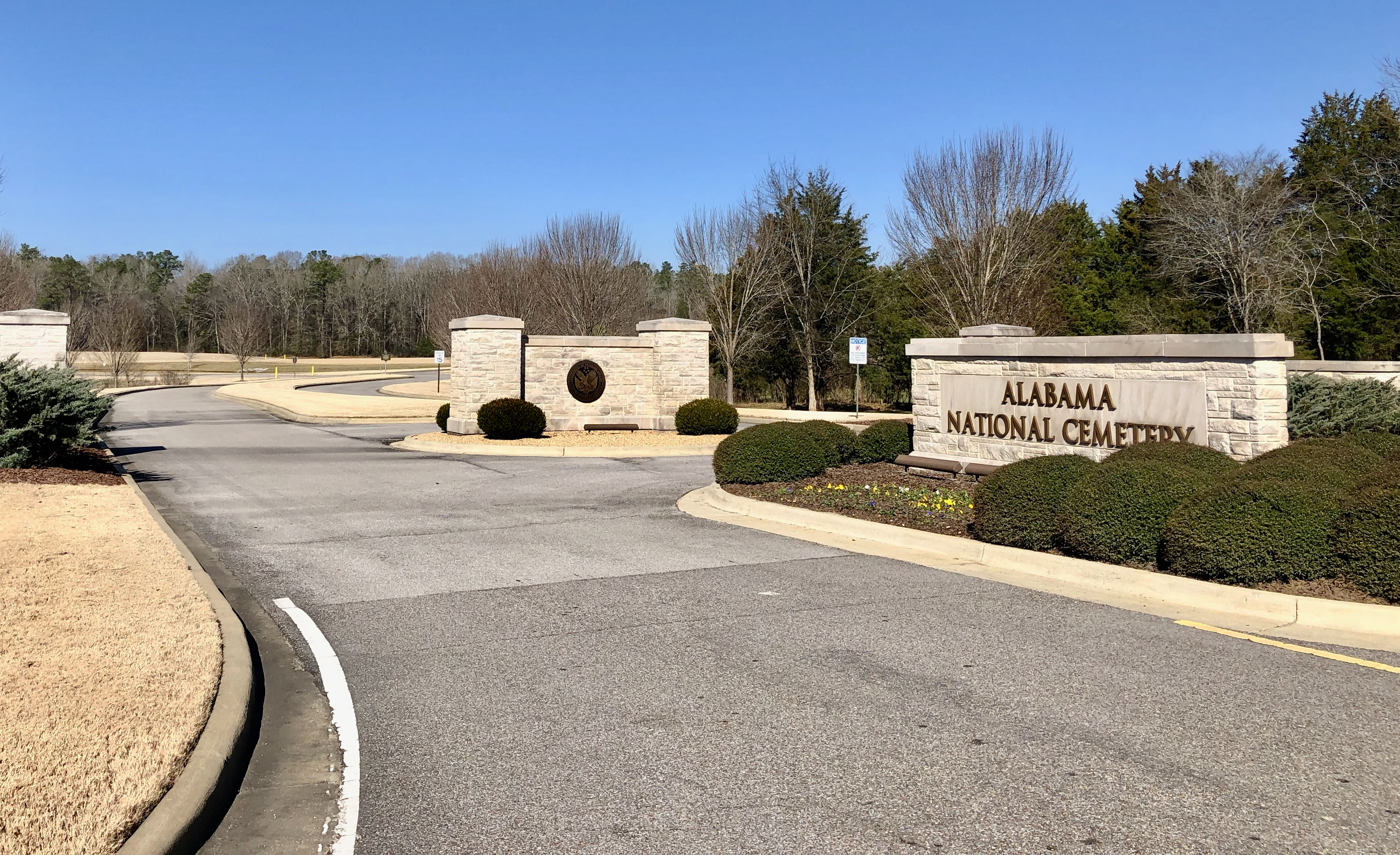

The first phase of the cemetery includes an entrance, roadways within the section, permanent buildings for administration and maintenance, a public information center and two shelters for services during inclement weather. Infrastructure consisting of drainage, fencing, landscaping, irrigation and utilities is also being built.

== Notable interments ==
- Virgil Trucks (1917–2013), Major League Baseball pitcher

== See also ==
- List of cemeteries in Alabama
