= Mount Nebo Cemetery =

Cemetery in Clarke County, Alabama

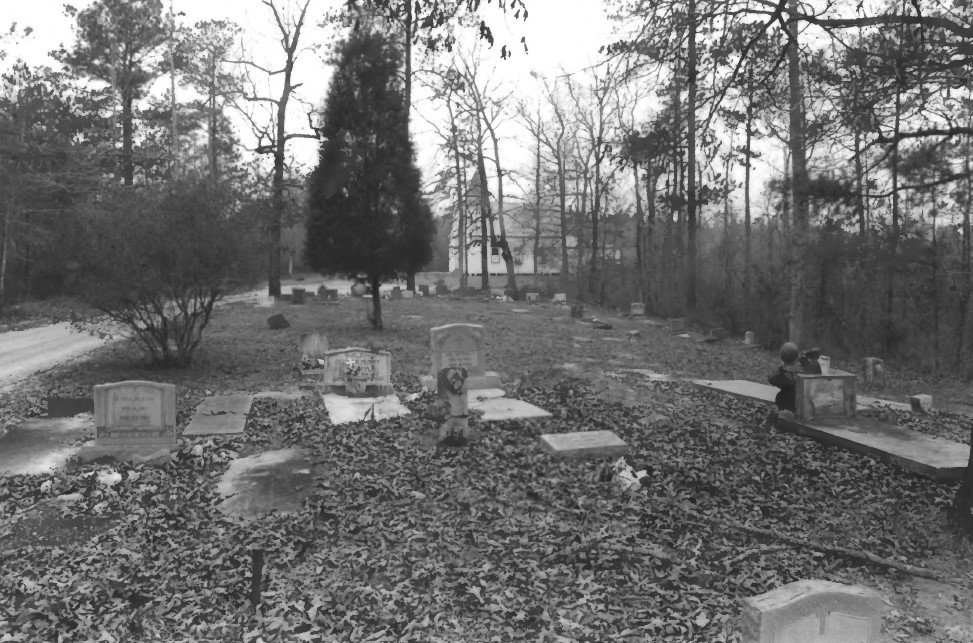
- Mount Nebo Cemetery in 2000
- Interactive map of Mount Nebo Cemetery

Details
- Location: near Carlton, Clarke County, Alabama
- Country: United States
- Coordinates: 31.3467°N 87.8686°W
- Type: Baptist
- No. of graves: approximately 86
- Find a Grave: Mount Nebo Cemetery

Mount Nebo Cemetery, also known as Mount Nebo Baptist Church Cemetery, is a historic cemetery located near Carlton, in rural Clarke County, Alabama, United States. The cemetery contains the Isaac Nettles Gravestones, a series of unusually designed gravestones with "death masks" on them, which are listed on the National Register of Historic Places since 2000. It is considered a haunted site by some people.

== History ==
The Mount Nebo Cemetery east of the white church building for Mount Nebo Baptist Church, and are located at the fork where the Alabama and Tombigbee Rivers merge. It is located down a dirt road in the woods. Many of the burials throughout the cemetery are marked by concrete markers and slabs. There are a variety of styles of grave markers, although most are simple and date from the 1950s and forward. There are two gravestones in the cemetery that feature a clock face.

It is unknown if Isaac "Ike" Nettles (1885–1957), the maker of the notable Isaac Nettles Gravestones, is buried in Mount Nebo Cemetery in an unmarked grave or if he was buried in Detroit. In 2006, a person living in the town of Rockford found a concrete bust of a Black man buried on his land, which he donated it to the Clarke County Museum; it is thought to be another work by Nettles.

== See also ==
- List of cemeteries in Alabama
- National Register of Historic Places listings in Clarke County, Alabama
