= Magnolia Cemetery (Mobile, Alabama) =

Historic cemetery

- Magnolia Cemetery including Mobile National Cemetery
- U.S. National Register of Historic Places
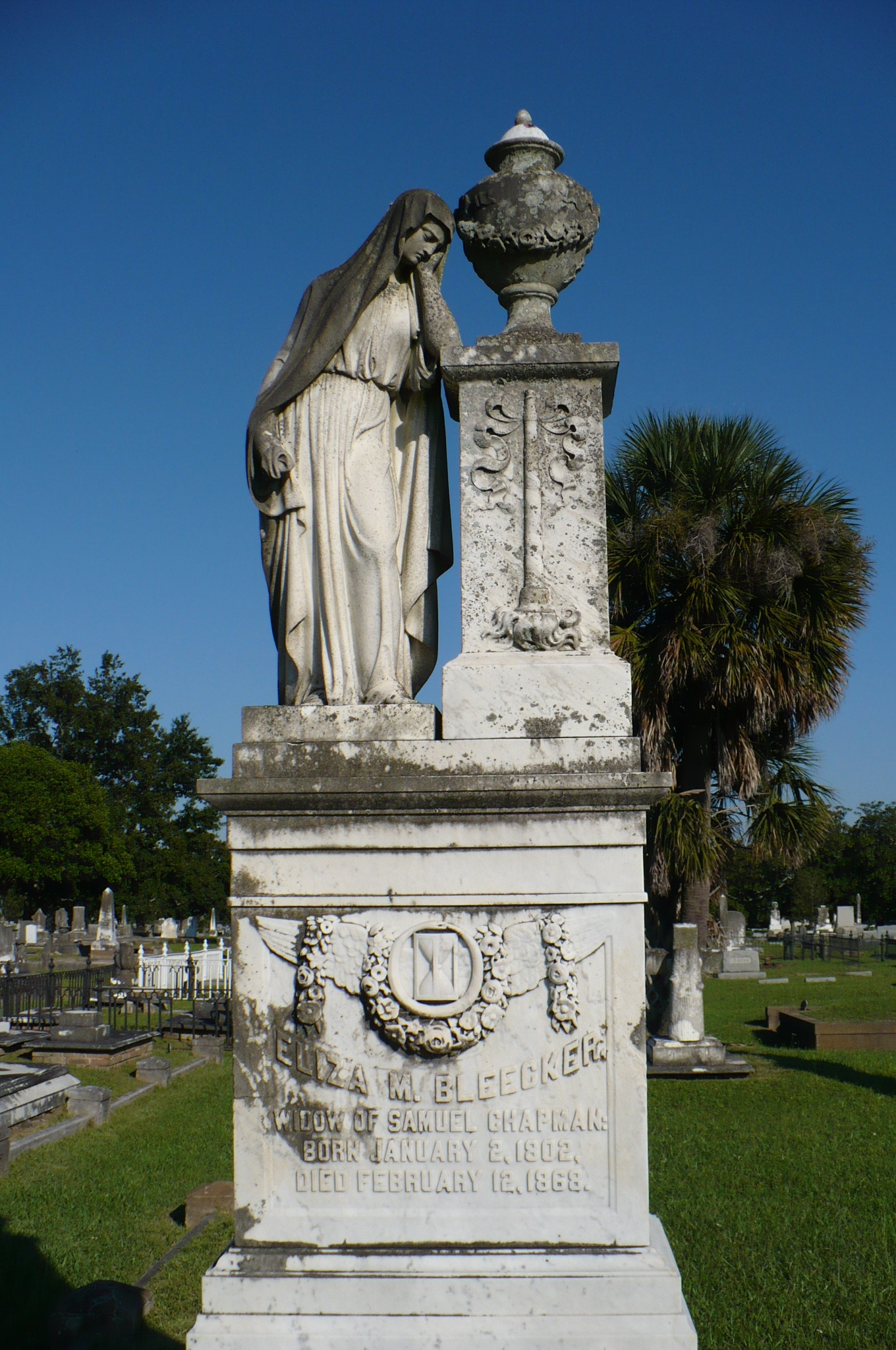
- Neoclassical-style statuary monument for Eliza Bleecker.
- Location: Ann and Virginia Streets, Mobile, Alabama, US
- Coordinates: 30°40′32″N 88°03′53″W
- Built: 1836
- Architectural style: Funerary
- NRHP reference No.: 86003757
- Added to NRHP: June 13, 1986

Magnolia Cemetery is a historic city cemetery located in Mobile, Alabama, United States. It spans more than 100 acres (40 ha). It served as Mobile's primary, and almost exclusive, burial place during the 19th century and is filled with many elaborate Victorian-era monuments. It is the final resting place for many of Mobile's 19th- and early 20th-century citizens. The cemetery is roughly bounded by Frye Street to the north, Gayle Street to the east, and Ann Street to the west. Virginia Street originally formed the southern border before the cemetery was expanded and now cuts east–west through the center of the cemetery. Magnolia contains more than 80,000 burials and remains an active, though very limited, burial site today.

== History ==
Magnolia Cemetery was established by municipal ordinance on an initial 36 acres (15 ha) parcel outside the city limits in 1836 as Mobile's New Burial Ground. The cemetery grew to its present size with the addition of the numerous new sections.

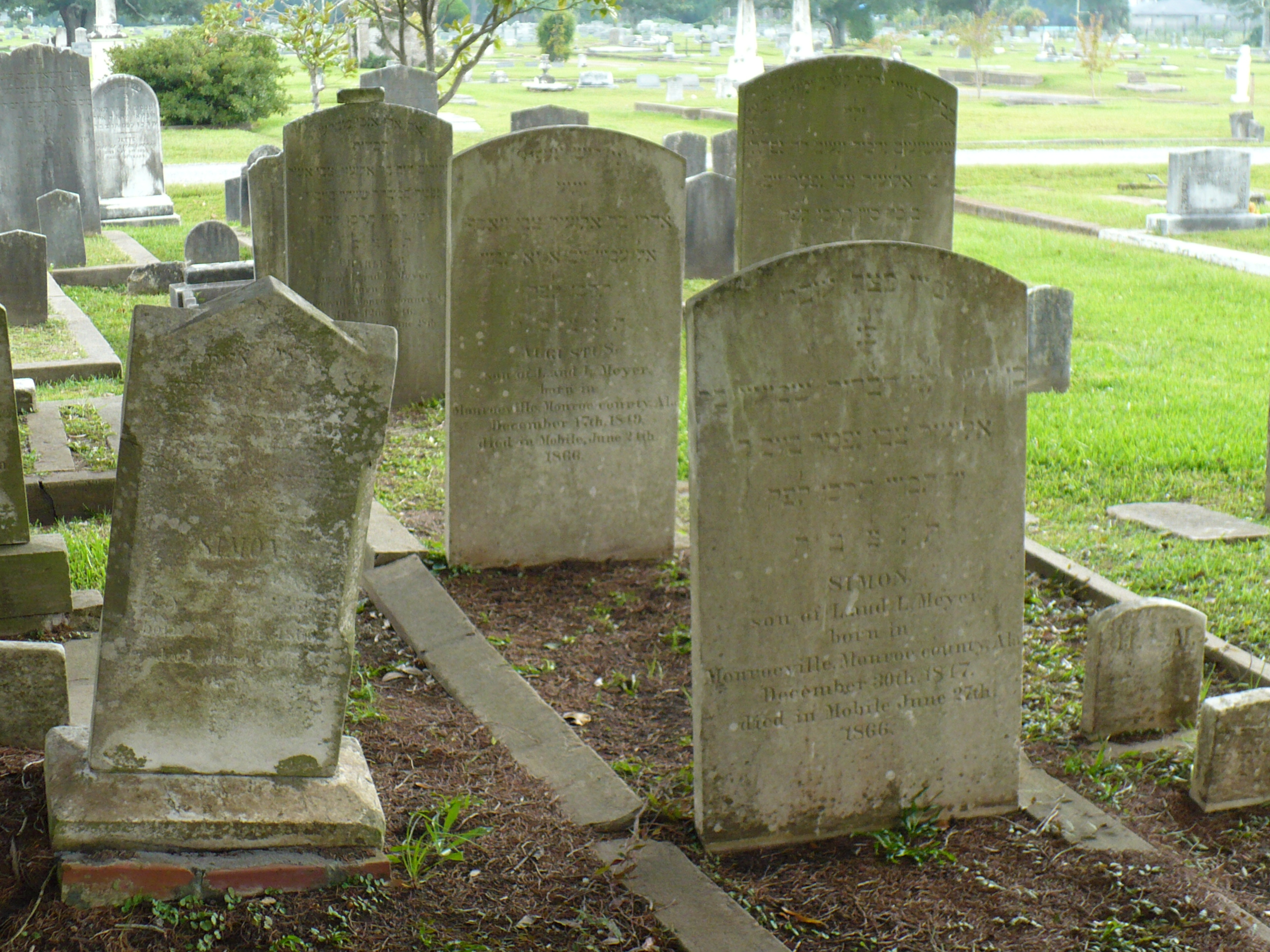
A portion of the Jewish Rest section, with graves inscribed in English and Hebrew

The Jewish Rest section, also known as the Old Hebrew Burial Ground, was deeded to Congregation Sha'arai Shomayim, the oldest Reform Jewish congregation in the state of Alabama, by the City of Mobile on June 22, 1841. The oldest Jewish burial ground in Alabama, the Jewish Rest section filled up after only a few decades and led to the establishment of two additional Jewish cemeteries in Mobile, the Sha'arai Shomayim Cemetery for the Reform congregation and the Ahavas Chesed Cemetery for the Conservative congregation.

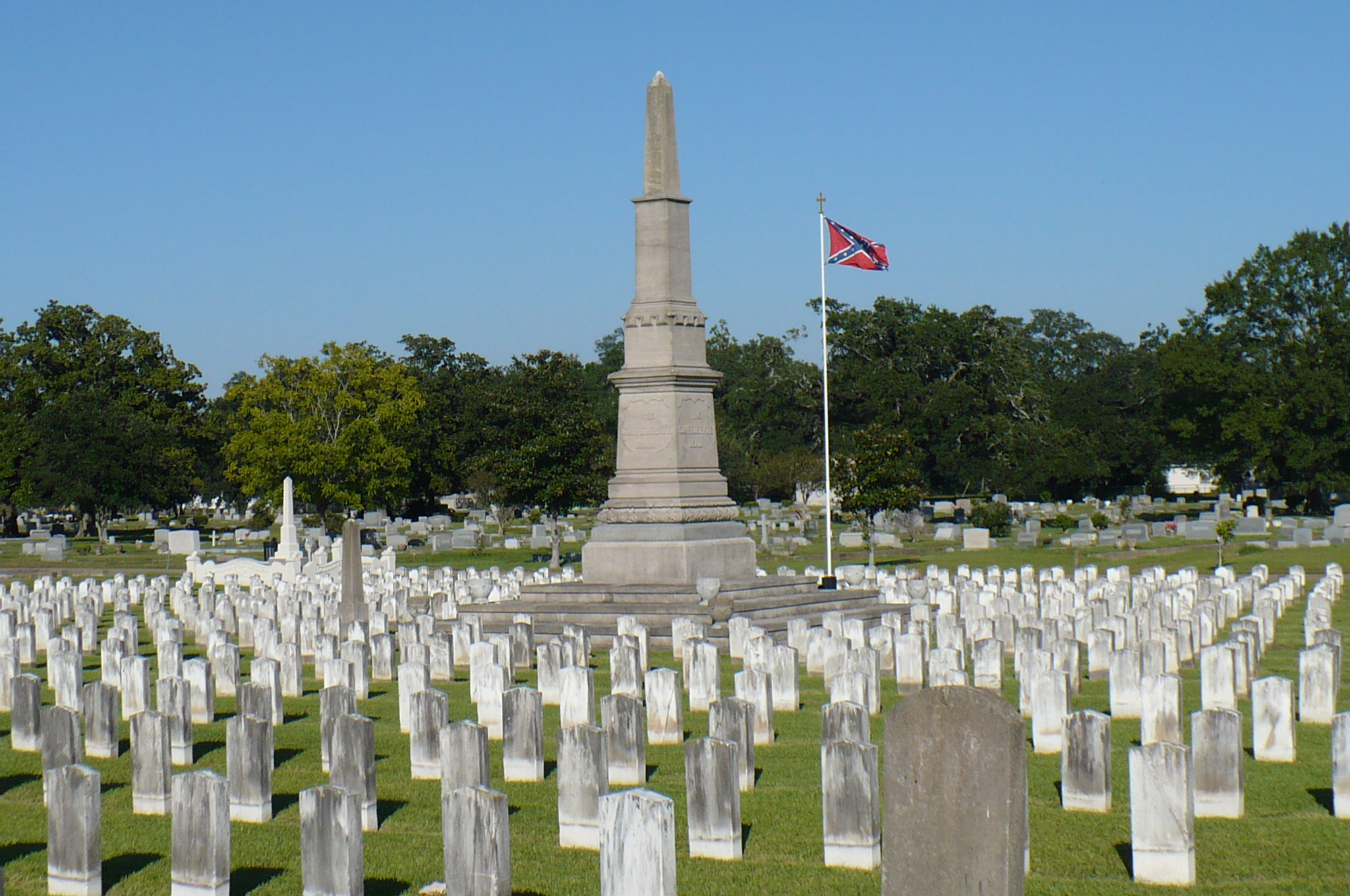
The Confederate Rest monument, surrounded by the graves of 1100 Confederate war dead

In 1846 the city began to grant free burial plots within the cemetery to civic, labor, and religious organizations. The Coal Handlers Union, Colored Benevolent Institution Number One, Cotton Weighers Society, Draymens Relief Society, Homeless Seamen, Independent Ladies Mill and Timber Association, and the Protestant Orphan Asylum Society were among those organizations to take advantage of this policy until it was ended in 1873.

The Confederate Rest section was added on November 25, 1861 for Confederate soldiers. Initially called Soldiers Rest, the Mobile National Cemetery annex was established immediately after the war, on May 11, 1866, when the city donated 3 acres (1.2 ha) to the U.S. government for use as a National Cemetery. The cemetery as a whole was renamed Magnolia Cemetery on January 15, 1867.

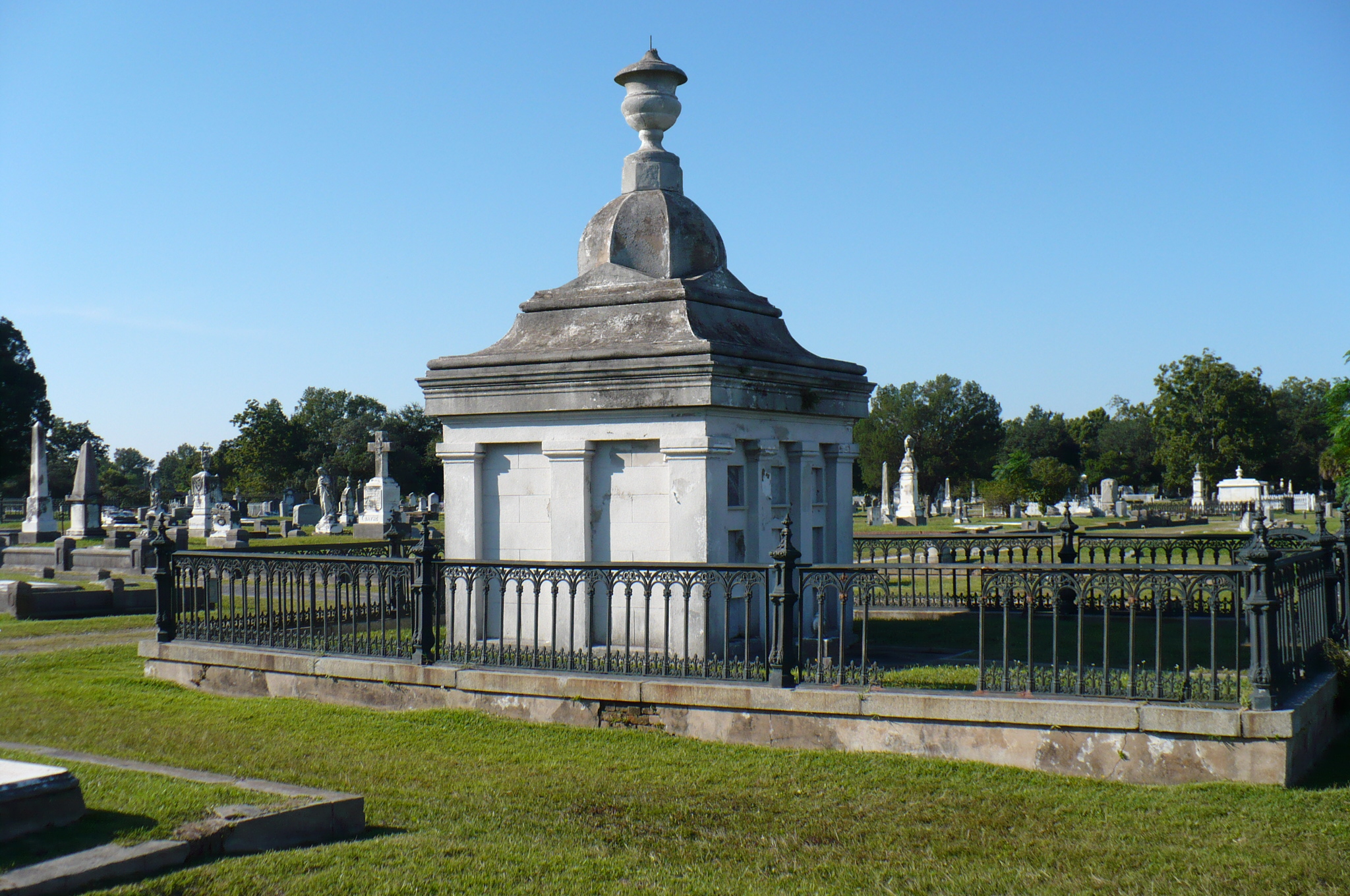
The Greek Revival-style Wilson Mausoleum

On August 20, 1868 the 7 acres (2.8 ha) Goldsmith and Frohlichstein extension was added to the cemetery, adjacent to the Jewish Rest section. The elevated and highly desirable plots in this section eventually became the resting place for both Jews and Gentiles, and came to contain some of the more elaborate sculptures and mausolea in the entire cemetery. The cemetery was enclosed with a fence in 1883. 1913 saw the addition of a set of monumental twin Mediterranean Revival gatehouses and wrought iron gates at the George Street entrance. Small additions continued to be made to the cemetery into the 1920s, extending the earlier Goldsmith and Frohlichstein section.

With the expansion of Mobile and the establishment of large private cemeteries in the first half of the 20th century, Magnolia Cemetery began to go into decline. Mobile National Cemetery was closed to burial in 1962 due to it being filled to capacity, like most of the remainder of the cemetery. By 1970 nearly 60% of the cemetery was not being cared for and had become extremely overgrown. In 1984 the Historic Mobile Preservation Society formed the Friends of Magnolia Cemetery as a non-profit corporation.

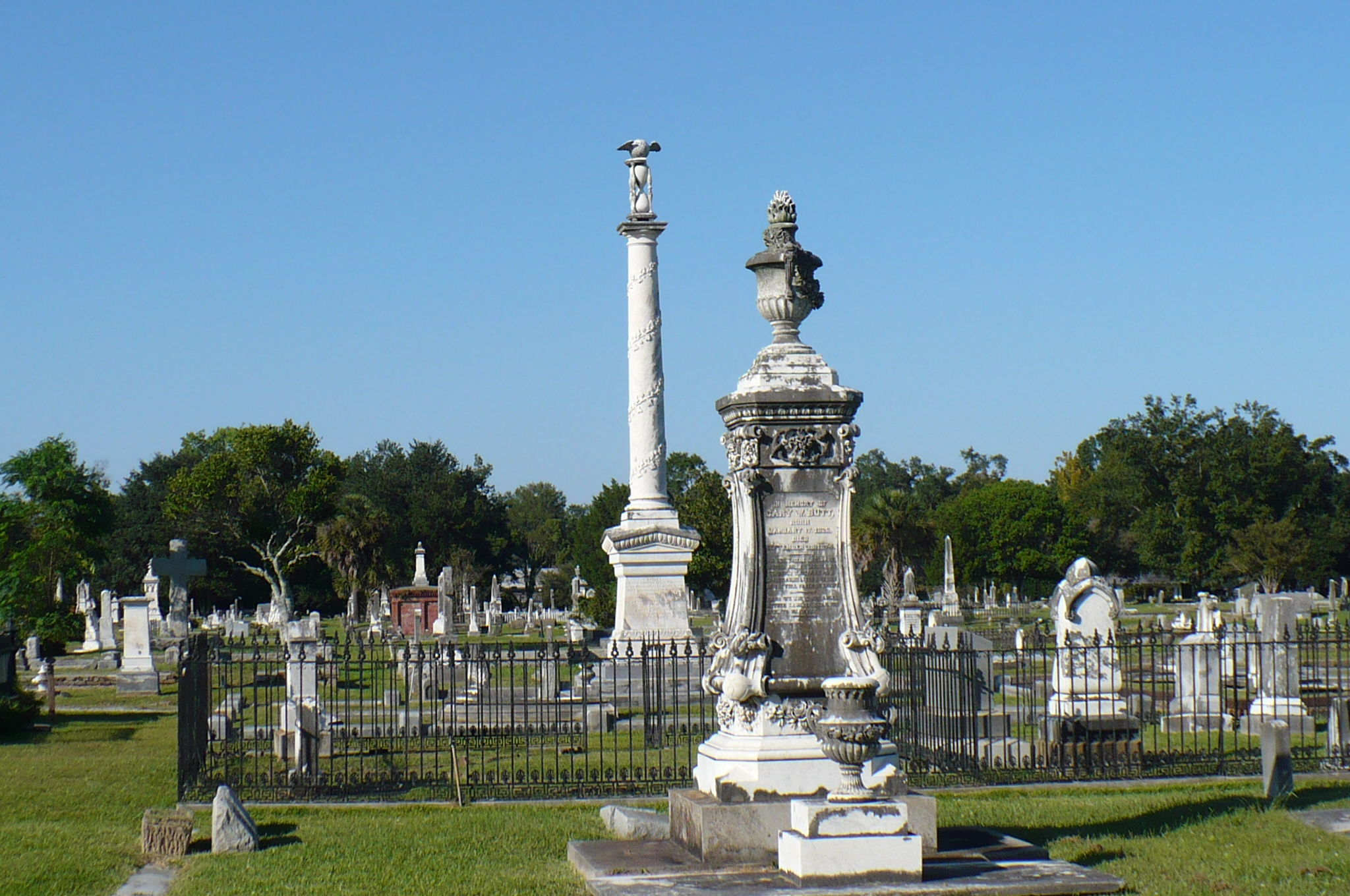
One of the mid-19th-century portions of the cemetery, indicating the variety of monuments that may be found there

The goals of the Friends of Magnolia Cemetery included the establishment of perpetual care for the plots, cleaning up the cemetery, removing or improving the existing vegetation, improving maintenance, restoring historic monuments and ironwork, hiring a superintendent for day-to-day operations, and surrounding the site with a new wrought iron fence. The new fence was conceived and designed by local architects Arch R. Winter and Thomas F. Karwinski. Along with its notable monuments and the prominent individuals interred, the efforts by the Friends of Magnolia Cemetery helped lead to the cemetery being placed on the National Register of Historic Places in 1986.

In 1997 local veterans requested that the Mobile National Cemetery section be reopened to burial with an expansion into the last city owned piece of property at the southeast corner of Ann and Virginia Streets. Upon investigation with ground-penetrating radar it was re-discovered that the proposed area of expansion had at one time been used as a paupers field for indigent burials. Although these remains had been relocated to another location years earlier, Veterans Administration rules would not permit the area to be reused for veteran burials.

== Notable monuments ==
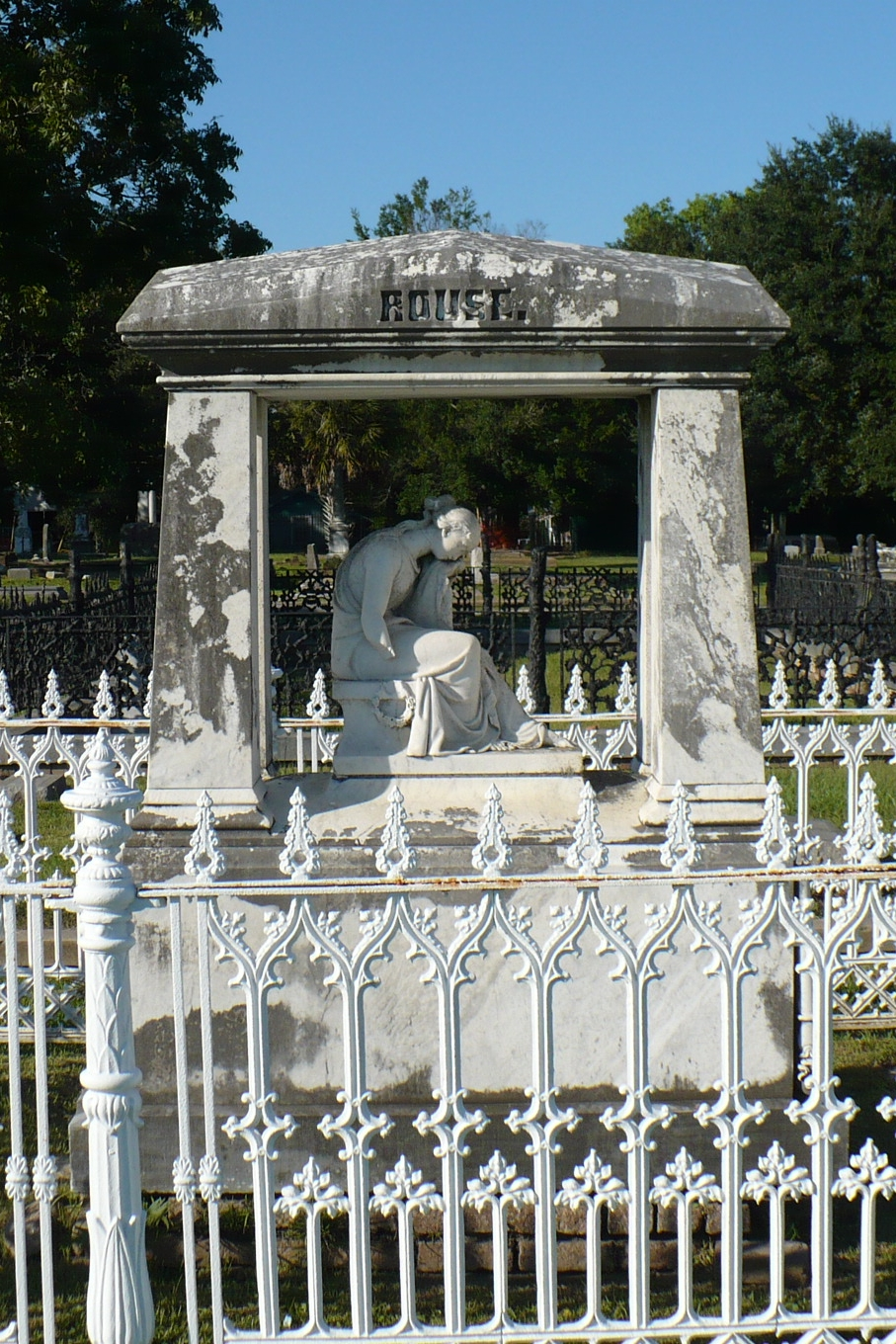
The Rouse monument, in a restrained Grecian mode, surrounded by an elaborate Gothic Revival cast iron fence.

The Pomeroy family mausoleum is one of two cast iron over brick mausoleums in the cemetery. The Rouse monument is a Neoclassical style monument with a classically robed mourning woman placed beneath a low profiled gable supported at the four corners by columns. The Confederate Rest section of the cemetery contains 1100 war dead and many large, elaborate monuments and includes an obelisk commemorating the men who died on the Confederate submarine H.L. Hunley. The Jewish Cemetery contains many simple styles with Hebrew inscriptions, in addition to some of the more elaborate plots within the cemetery. The Caldwell mausoleum is an example of a Gothic Revival style mausoleum. It contains a lifesize interior angel. The Wilson mausoleum, by contrast, is in an example of Egyptian Revival style and features an interior wall with stained glass. The LeBlanc memorial is dedicated to two sisters who died in infancy and whose grandmother commissioned the small Neo-Renaissance statuary of two putti leaning together over a stone marker. It is one of the most photographed markers in the cemetery. The Bellingrath-Morse monument is a classical semicircular Doric colonnade and is one of the tallest monuments within the grounds. The Mobile National Cemetery annex includes a Second Empire-style gatehouse and a brick stable built in the 1880s. This annex contains over 5000 burials and a monument for the 76th Illinois Volunteer Infantry Regiment. The monument was erected in 1892 by the Union Army survivors of the Battle of Fort Blakeley. The annex also contains the graves of thirteen Apaches who were held as prisoners nearby at Mount Vernon Arsenal between 1887 and 1894 by the Federal government.

A sailor of the British Merchant Navy during World War II, whose grave is registered by the Commonwealth War Graves Commission, is buried here.

== Notable interments ==
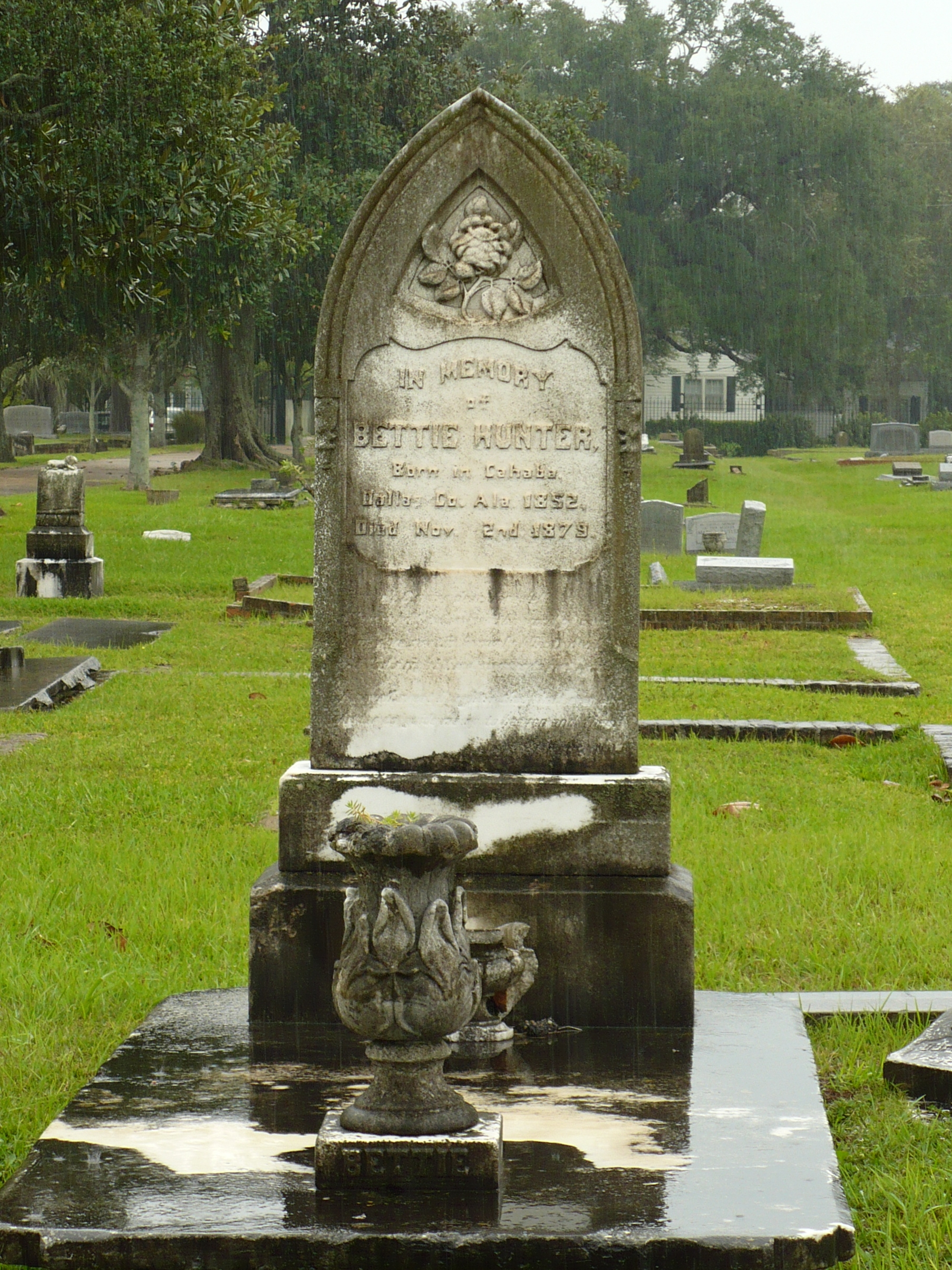
Bettie Hunter monument, a prominent 19th-century African American businesswoman

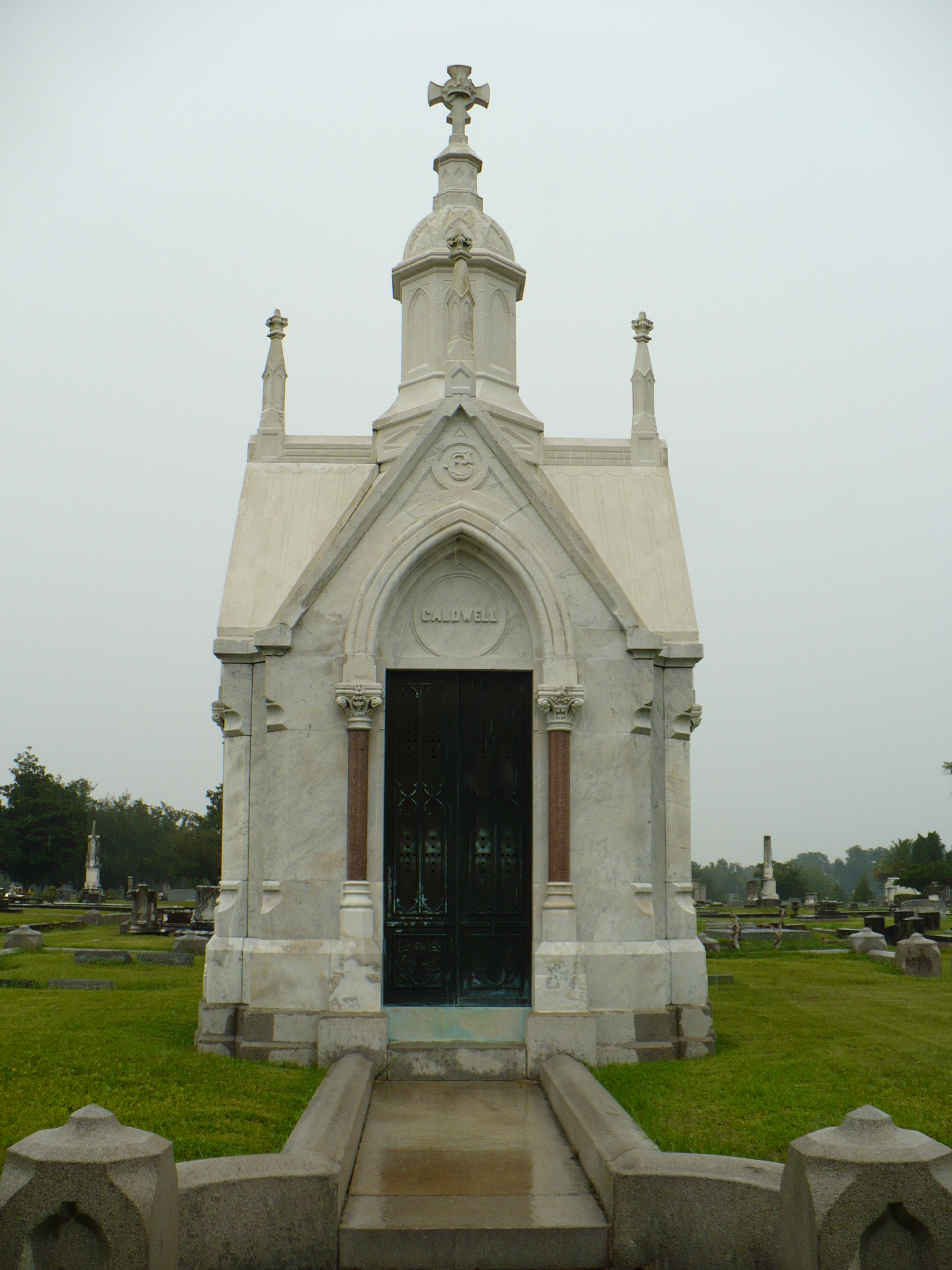
The Gothic Revival Caldwell Mausoleum

- Arthur Pendleton Bagby, served as Governor of Alabama from 1837 to 1841. U.S. Minister to Russia from 1848 to 1849.
- James Battle, established the renowned Battle House Hotel.
- Dr. Josiah C. Nott, famous and controversial 19th-century physician, surgeon, and author.
- Walter D. and Bessie Morse Bellingrath, founders of Bellingrath Gardens and Home.
- Braxton Bragg, served as a Confederate general during the American Civil War, also served the United States in the Seminole Wars and the Mexican–American War.
- John Bragg, appointed judge of the tenth Alabama judicial circuit in 1842 and served as a U.S. representative for Alabama from 1851 to 1853. He also built the Bragg-Mitchell Mansion in Mobile.
- Frederick George Bromberg, served as an Alabama state senator from 1868 to 1872 and then as a U.S. representative for Alabama from 1873 to 1875.
- Richard Henry Clarke, served as a U.S. representative for Alabama from 1889 to 1897.
- Kate Cumming, Scottish-born Confederate nurse during the American Civil War.
- Edmund Strother Dargan, served as a U.S. representative for Alabama from 1845 to 1847 and then as a Confederate Representative for Alabama from 1862 to 1864.
- Thomas Cooper de Leon, journalist, author, and playwright. After the American Civil War he was the editor for the Mobile Register.
- Robert Desha, veteran of the War of 1812 and served as a U.S. representative for Tennessee from 1827 to 1831. He was also Alva Vanderbilt's maternal grandfather.
- John Forsyth, Jr., U.S. Minister to Mexico from 1856 to 1858 and later editor of the Mobile Register.
- John Gayle, Governor of Alabama from 1831 to 1835.
- Adley Hogan Gladden, served as a Confederate brigadier general during the American Civil War, also served the United States in the Seminole Wars and the Mexican–American War.
- Thomas H. Herndon, served as a U.S. representative for Alabama from 1879 to 1883.
- Bettie Hunter, successful 19th-century African American businesswoman.
- John Herbert Kelly, youngest brigadier general in the Confederate States Army at the time of his promotion and one of the youngest generals to die during the war at the age of 24.
- Michael Krafft, founder of the Cowbellian de Rakin mystic society.
- Danville Leadbetter, served as a Confederate brigadier general during the American Civil War.
- Percy Walker, served as a U.S. representative for Alabama from 1855 to 1857.
- Jones Mitchell Withers, served as a Confederate major general during the American Civil War.
- Augusta Evans Wilson, Civil War author.
