= Bettie Hunter House =

Historic house in Alabama, United States

- Hunter House
- U.S. National Register of Historic Places
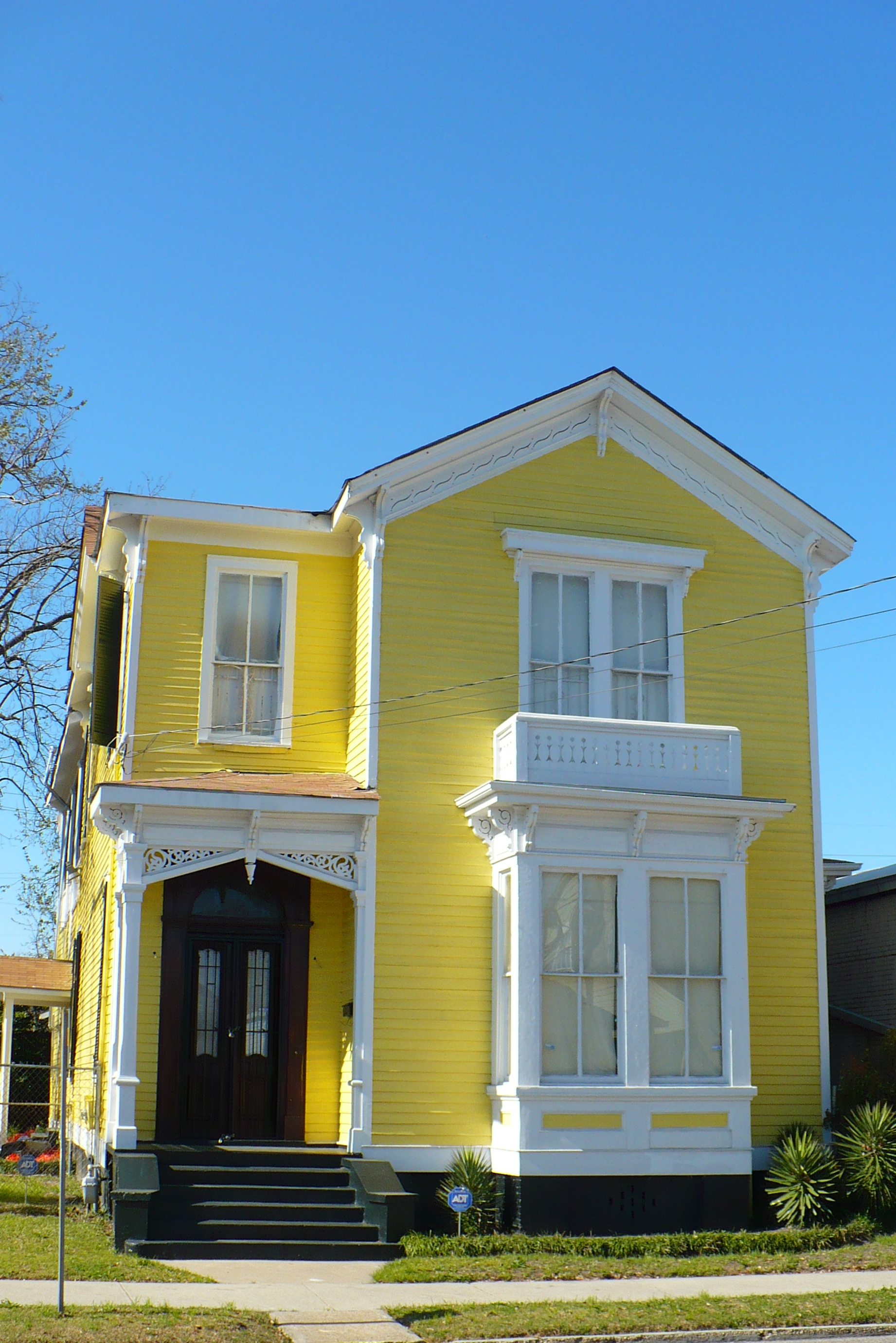
- The Bettie Hunter House in 2008.

- Location within Mobile, Alabama Location within Alabama Location within the United States
- Location: 504 St. Francis Street, Mobile, Alabama
- Coordinates: 30°41′26.92″N 88°2′56.27″W
- Area: less than one acre
- Built: 1878
- Architectural style: Italianate
- NRHP reference No.: 85000446
- Added to NRHP: March 7, 1985

The Bettie Hunter House is a historic African American residence in Mobile, Alabama, United States. It was the residence of Bettie Hunter, a former enslaved African who grew wealthy from a successful hack and carriage business she operated in Mobile with her brother, Henry. The fall of New Orleans during the American Civil War had made Mobile the South's only major port on the Gulf of Mexico. Transportation of goods to and from the port depended on the city's teamsters and their horse or mule-drawn wagons. Bettie Hunter was part of a group of African Americans who recognized the opportunities in the carriage business and she cornered this part of the transportation market in Mobile.

The Hunter House was built in 1878 and is an exceptional example of 19th-century residential architecture for an African American in the Deep South. The two-story Italianate house matches Mobile's white-owned residences of the period in scale and detail. Bettie Hunter died on November 2, 1879, at the age of 27. Her house had just been finished the year before. She was buried in Magnolia Cemetery in Mobile. She had no children and willed the property to her family.
