= Greenwood Cemetery (Tuscaloosa, Alabama) =

Cemetery in Tuscaloosa, Alabama

- Interactive map of Greenwood Cemetery

Details
- Established: c. 1820
- Location: 29th Avenue and 11th Street, Tuscaloosa, Tuscaloosa County, Alabama, U.S.
- Coordinates: 33.20360°N 87.57170°W
- Type: City
- No. of graves: approx. 1500
- Find a Grave: Greenwood Cemetery

Greenwood Cemetery
- Interactive map of Greenwood Cemetery

Alabama Register of Landmarks and Heritage
- Designated: July 26, 1983

Greenwood Cemetery is a city cemetery established in c. 1820 in Tuscaloosa, Alabama, U.S.. It is the oldest cemetery in the city and is located near the First African Baptist Church. It has a historical marker erected in 1996 by City of Tuscaloosa, the Heritage Commission of Tuscaloosa County, and Cahaba Trace Commission. Greenwood Cemetery is listed on the Alabama Register of Landmarks and Heritage since July 26, 1983.

== History ==
The exact founding date of Greenwood Cemetery is not known with many sources stating 1820, however others have stated 1819 and 1821. The cemetery has some 1,500 graves. Many of the early marble headstones were carved in New Orleans, Louisiana. It contains a main entrance with an ornate iron gate.

Greenwood Cemetery is the resting place for five veterans of the American Revolution. Several key figures in the city's history can also be found at the cemetery including former mayors, and Tuscaloosa's first probate judge.

A team of volunteers maintain and clean the cemetery grounds.

== Burials ==
- John Drish of the Drish Mansion.
- Phillip Dale Roddey, Confederate General
- Rev. Charles Allen Stillman, the founder of Stillman College

== See also ==
- List of cemeteries in Alabama
- Properties on the Alabama Register of Landmarks and Heritage by county (Pickens–Winston)
