= USS New =

Gearing-class destroyer

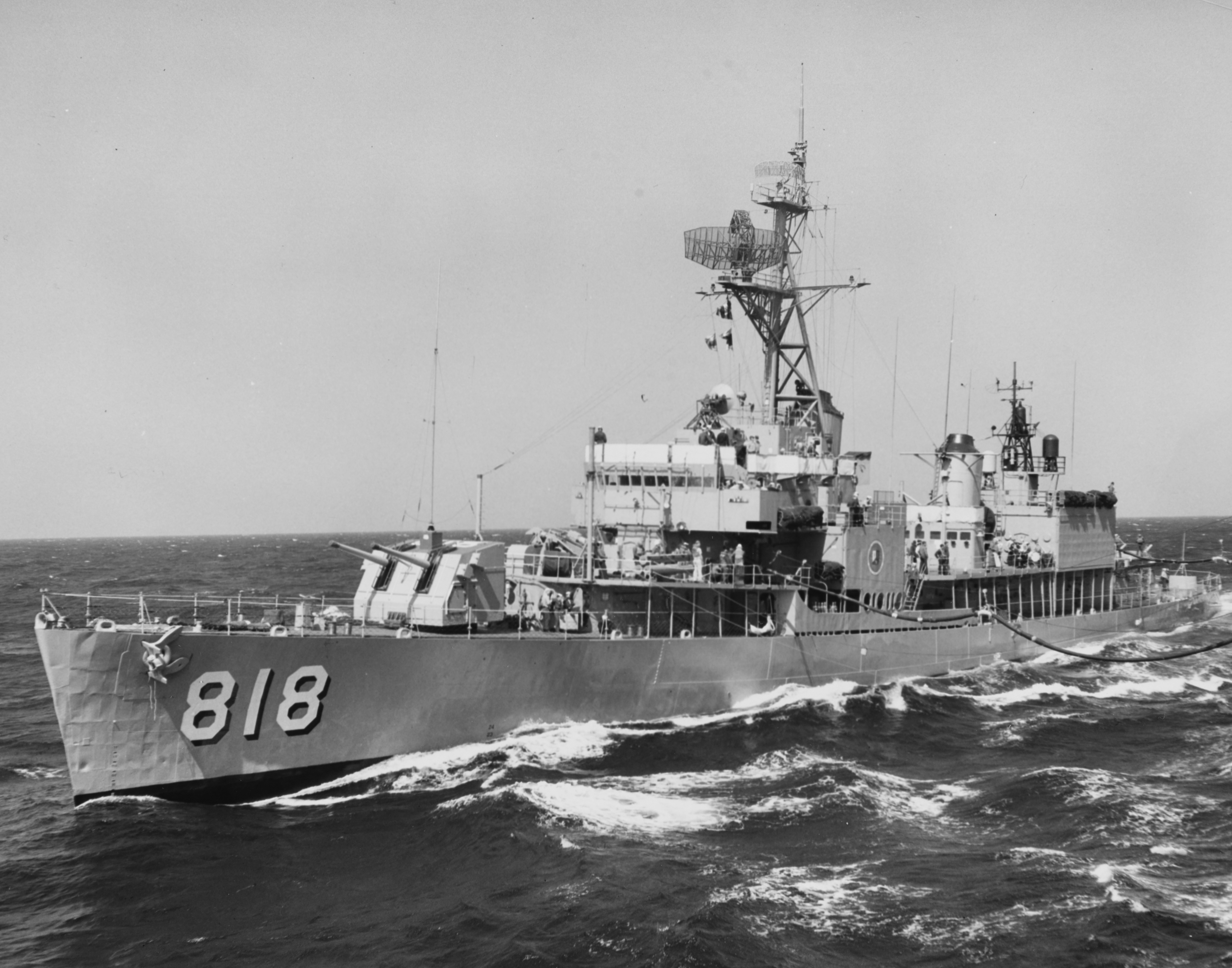
- USS New underway on 18 March 1965

History

United States
- Name: New
- Namesake: John D. New
- Builder: Consolidated Steel Corporation
- Laid down: 14 April 1945
- Launched: 18 August 1945
- Commissioned: 5 April 1946
- Modernized: 1962-1963 (FRAM IB)
- Decommissioned: 1 July 1976
- Identification: Callsign: NNEW; Hull number: DD-818
- Reclassified: DDE-818, 4 March 1950; DD-818, 30 June 1962
- Stricken: 1 July 1976
- Motto: Anything, Anytime, Anyplace
- Fate: Transferred to South Korea, 23 February 1977
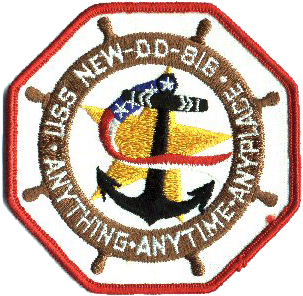
- Badge

South Korea
- Name: Taejon; (대전)
- Namesake: Taejon
- Acquired: 23 February 1977
- Commissioned: 23 February 1977
- Decommissioned: February 2001
- Reclassified: DD-919
- Identification: Hull number: DD-99
- Fate: Presumed scrapped

General characteristics
- Class & type: Gearing-class destroyer; Kangwon-class destroyer
- Displacement: 3,460 long tons (3,516 t) full
- Length: 390 ft 6 in (119.02 m)
- Beam: 40 ft 10 in (12.45 m)
- Draft: 14 ft 4 in (4.37 m)
- Propulsion: Geared turbines, 2 shafts, 60,000 shp (45 MW)
- Speed: 35 knots (65 km/h; 40 mph)
- Range: 4,500 nmi (8,300 km) at 20 kn (37 km/h; 23 mph)
- Complement: 336
- Armament: 6 × 5"/38 caliber guns; 12 × 40 mm AA guns; 11 × 20 mm AA guns; 10 × 21 inch (533 mm) torpedo tubes; 6 × depth charge projectors; 2 × depth charge tracks

USS New (DD/DDE-818) was a Gearing-class destroyer of the United States Navy, named for United States Marine Corps Private First Class John D. New (1924–1944), who was posthumously awarded the Medal of Honor for "selfless conduct" in the Battle of Peleliu.

New was laid down on 14 April 1945 by the Consolidated Steel Corp., Orange, Texas; launched on 18 August 1945; sponsored by Mrs. Barbara Julien, sister of PFC John New; and commissioned on 5 April 1946.

== Service history ==
=== 1946–1958 ===
Following a Caribbean shakedown and type training off the East Coast, New got underway for the Mediterranean on 8 August 1946. During the first week of September she cruised off the coast of Greece with the aircraft carrier Franklin D. Roosevelt, providing weight to American diplomatic efforts to assure Greek citizens the right of self-determination in the 1 September plebiscite which returned King George II to the throne and reinforced their previously recorded (31 March 1946) repudiation of the Communist Party and its supporters, who were then engaged in guerrilla activities. Her mission, a precursor to the Truman Doctrine, completed, New joined Task Group 125.4 (TG 125.4), then operating with British warships in the Adriatic to prevent any outbreak of hostilities between Italy and Yugoslavia over Trieste.

On 8 February 1947, New got underway for the United States, where, after overhaul, she commenced three years of employment in type training and anti-submarine warfare (ASW) exercises from Key West to the Davis Strait. In 1949 and 1950 she added midshipman training cruises to that schedule. On 9 September 1950, New, now DDE-818 (effective 4 March 1950), departed her homeport of Norfolk, Virginia, for a month-long NATO exercise in the Mediterranean. On her return she resumed local operations with her squadron which on 1 January 1951 became Escort Destroyer Squadron 4 (CortDesRon 4). For the next six years New, a unit of the Atlantic Fleet's Destroyer Force, continued to rotate tours in the Mediterranean with duty in the Western Atlantic. Assigned to the same fleet's antisubmarine force in April 1956, she conducted her third midshipman training cruise the following summer and, in July, became flagship of DesRon 36.

On 8 May 1958, New departed Hampton Roads for her eighth tour with the 6th Fleet. During this extended Mediterranean deployment she participated in 6th Fleet operations in response to Lebanese President Camille Chamoun's request for aid in countering a coup against his regime. One of the first ships on the spot, she patrolled Beirut Straits awaiting word to evacuate American nationals if it became necessary.

=== 1962–1968 ===
1962 brought another break in New's regular schedule of operations. Reclassified DD–818 once again, on 30 June, she trained midshipmen during the summer and in the fall was called on to participate in the Cuban quarantine. Departing Norfolk on 26 October she was engaged in ASW screening and surface vessel surveillance as a unit of Task Group Bravo until 20 November. Then, quitting the Caribbean, New returned to Norfolk where she underwent availability and upkeep prior to entering the Norfolk Naval Shipyard for a Fleet Rehabilitation and Modernization (FRAM) Mark I conversion, during which she received the ASROC system.

On 7 December 1963, the modernized New returned to active duty with a new squadron, DesRon 22. With that squadron she participated in further ASW activities throughout most of 1964, taking time out during the summer to conduct a midshipman training cruise to Europe. On 5 March 1965 she resumed her regular 6th Fleet deployment, adding, on that tour, a new dimension by taking on patrol duties in the vital and volatile Red Sea and Persian Gulf areas to bolster units of the Royal Navy's forces East of Suez.

In 1967, New's overseas deployment was again shifted to a new area and on 20 June she departed Norfolk for WestPac to support operations in Southeast Asia. On 29 July she arrived at Subic Bay and by 8 August she was at Da Nang, South Vietnam, whence she steamed north to take up duties on the Northern Search and Rescue Station in Tonkin Gulf as a unit of Task Force 77 (TF 77). On 29 September she took up fire support duties off Quang Ngai. There she supported elements of the ROK 2nd Marine Brigade and the 1st Marine Division during "Operation Dragon Fire", after which she retired from the combat area for a brief R&R period. On 19 November she returned to Vietnam for further fire support missions south of the DMZ, continuing that role until sailing for home on 1 December to arrive in Hampton Roads on 16 January 1968.

Into the summer of 1968, New took part in the search for the ill-fated submarine Scorpion, after which she prepared for another MidEast deployment. Departing the East Coast on 30 October, the destroyer set a course, necessitated by the closure of the Suez Canal, for Recife, thence around the Cape of Good Hope and into the Indian Ocean. By the end of the year she had called at Lourenço Marques, Diego Suarez, and Mombasa, and with the arrival of 1969, she added Djibouti and Bombay to her good-will visits prior to commencing her assigned operations along the coast of the Eurasian heartland.

=== 1969–1976 ===
In July 1969, New was part of the support fleet for the Apollo 11 Moon landing, on station in the launch abort area in the Atlantic Ocean.

August 1969 saw New in Cape Kennedy, Florida where she participated in DASO operations and also served as sonar school ship for Fleet Sonar School, Key West, Florida. Upon arrival back in her home port on 25 September 1969 New underwent tender availability with USS Tidewater and in November 1969 she entered the Norfolk Naval shipyard in Portsmouth, Virginia for a period of two weeks to undergo minor repairs.

During the period 26 January to 24 February 1970 New acted as a gunfire support ship at Guantanamo bay, Cuba. New returned to Norfolk for upkeep and preparation for Apollo 13 operations in early April. Having earned a Meritorious Unit Commendation for her part in the Apollo 13 recovery force in April 1970 New then returned to the Norfolk Naval Shipyard in Portsmouth for a four-month overhaul.

After her refitting USS New left the shipyard in August 1970 to prepare for refresher training. On 17 September 1970 the ship left Norfolk Naval Base for REFTRA with the fleet training group at Guantanamo Bay. New returned to Norfolk on 10 November 1970 for preparation for her upcoming Mediterranean cruise.

New was stricken from the Naval Vessel Register on 1 July 1976.

== ROKS Taejon ==
The ship was transferred to South Korea on 23 February 1977. She served in the Republic of Korea Navy as ROKS Taejon. She was decommissioned by Korea in February 2001.
