= Carlton, Alabama =

- Unincorporated community Census-designated place
- Location of Carlton in Clarke County, Alabama.
- Coordinates: 31°20′35″N 87°50′16″W
- Country: United States
- State: Alabama
- County: Clarke

Area
  - Total: 4.53 sq mi (11.72 km^{2})
  - Land: 4.52 sq mi (11.71 km^{2})
  - Water: 0.0039 sq mi (0.01 km^{2})
- Elevation: 157 ft (48 m)

Population (2020)
  - Total: 46
  - Density: 10.2/sq mi (3.93/km^{2})
- Time zone: UTC-6 (Central (CST))
  - Summer (DST): UTC-5 (CDT)
- ZIP code: 36515
- Area code: 251
- FIPS code: 01-12112
- GNIS feature ID: 2628583

Carlton is an unincorporated community and census-designated place (CDP) in Clarke County, Alabama, United States. As of the 2020 census, its population was 46. It was formerly known as Hal's Lake. The Isaac Nettles Gravestones are located in Carlton in the Mount Nebo Baptist Church Cemetery. They are listed on the National Register of Historic Places. There was one convenience store in Carlton until 2009.

== Geography ==
Carlton is located in southern Clarke County.

== Demographics ==
Historical population
Census	Pop.	Note	%±
2010	65		—
2020	46		−29.2%
U.S. Decennial Census

Carlton was listed as a census designated place in the 2010 U.S. census.

Carlton CDP, Alabama – Racial and ethnic composition Note: the US Census treats Hispanic/Latino as an ethnic category. This table excludes Latinos from the racial categories and assigns them to a separate category. Hispanics/Latinos may be of any race.
Race / Ethnicity (NH = Non-Hispanic)	Pop 2010	Pop 2020	% 2010	% 2020
White alone (NH)	41	22	63.08%	47.83%
Black or African American alone (NH)	22	16	33.85%	34.78%
Native American or Alaska Native alone (NH)	0	0	0.00%	0.00%
Asian alone (NH)	0	2	0.00%	4.35%
Native Hawaiian or Pacific Islander alone (NH)	0	0	0.00%	0.00%
Other race alone (NH)	0	0	0.00%	0.00%
Mixed race or Multiracial (NH)	0	5	0.00%	10.87%
Hispanic or Latino (any race)	2	1	3.08%	2.17%
Total	65	46	100.00%	100.00%
