= Airmount Grave Shelter =

- U.S. National Register of Historic Places
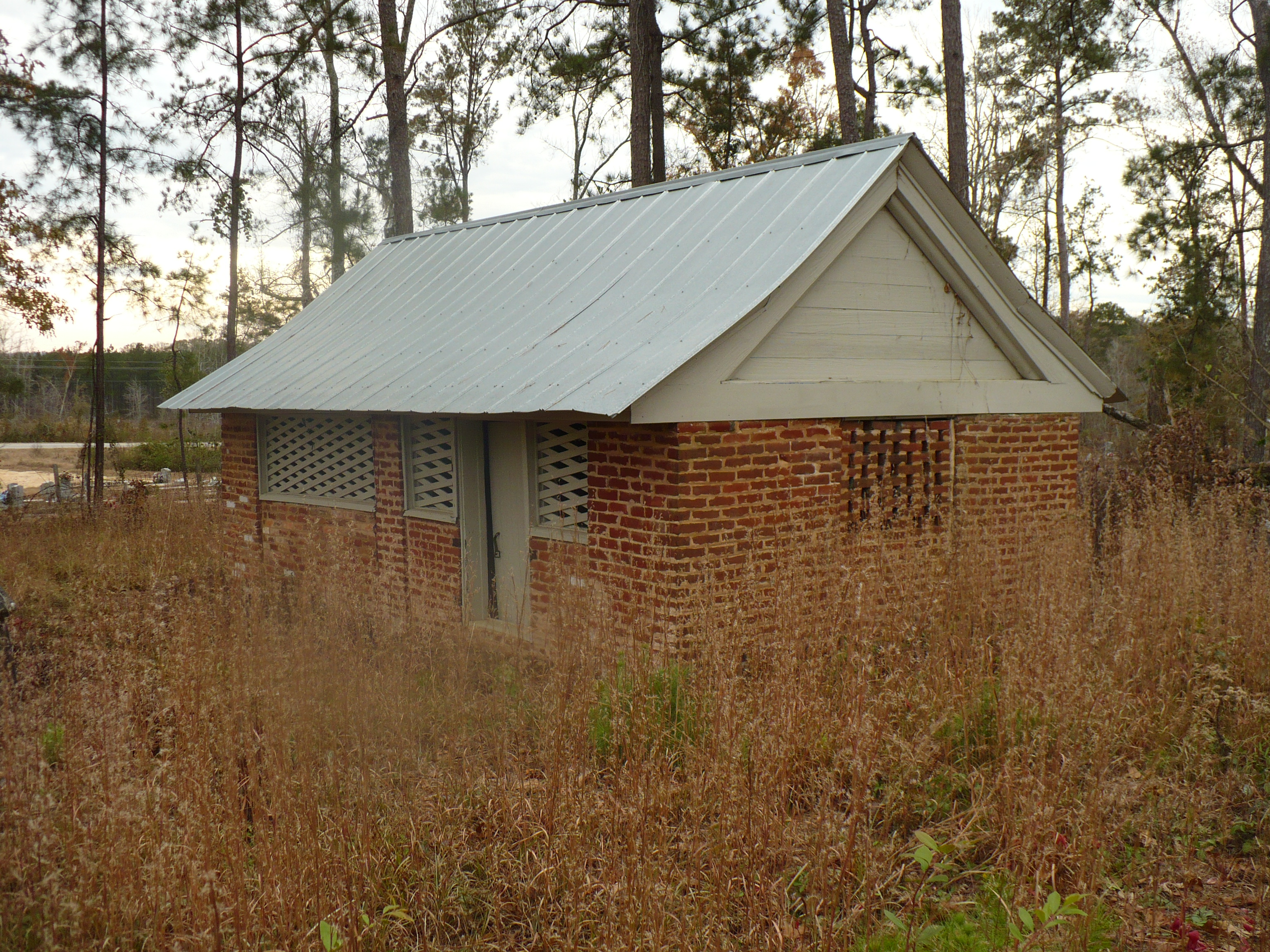
- The grave shelter in Airmount Cemetery.

- Location within Alabama Location within the United States
- Nearest city: Thomasville, Alabama
- Coordinates: 31°58′8″N 87°40′9″W
- Built: 1853
- Architectural style: Greek Revival
- MPS: Clarke County MPS
- NRHP reference No.: 00000142
- Added to NRHP: February 24, 2000

The Airmount Grave Shelter, also known as the Hope Family Grave Shelter, is a brick grave shelter, or grave house, located in the Airmount Cemetery near Thomasville, Alabama, United States. It is unusual in that it protects six graves instead of the more common one grave. The brick structure was built in 1853 by John Hope. It is built in a vernacular Greek Revival style with a gabled roof. The interior features a wooden vaulted ceiling. The shelter was placed on the National Register of Historic Places on February 24, 2000, as a part of the Clarke County Multiple Property Submission.

== Burials ==
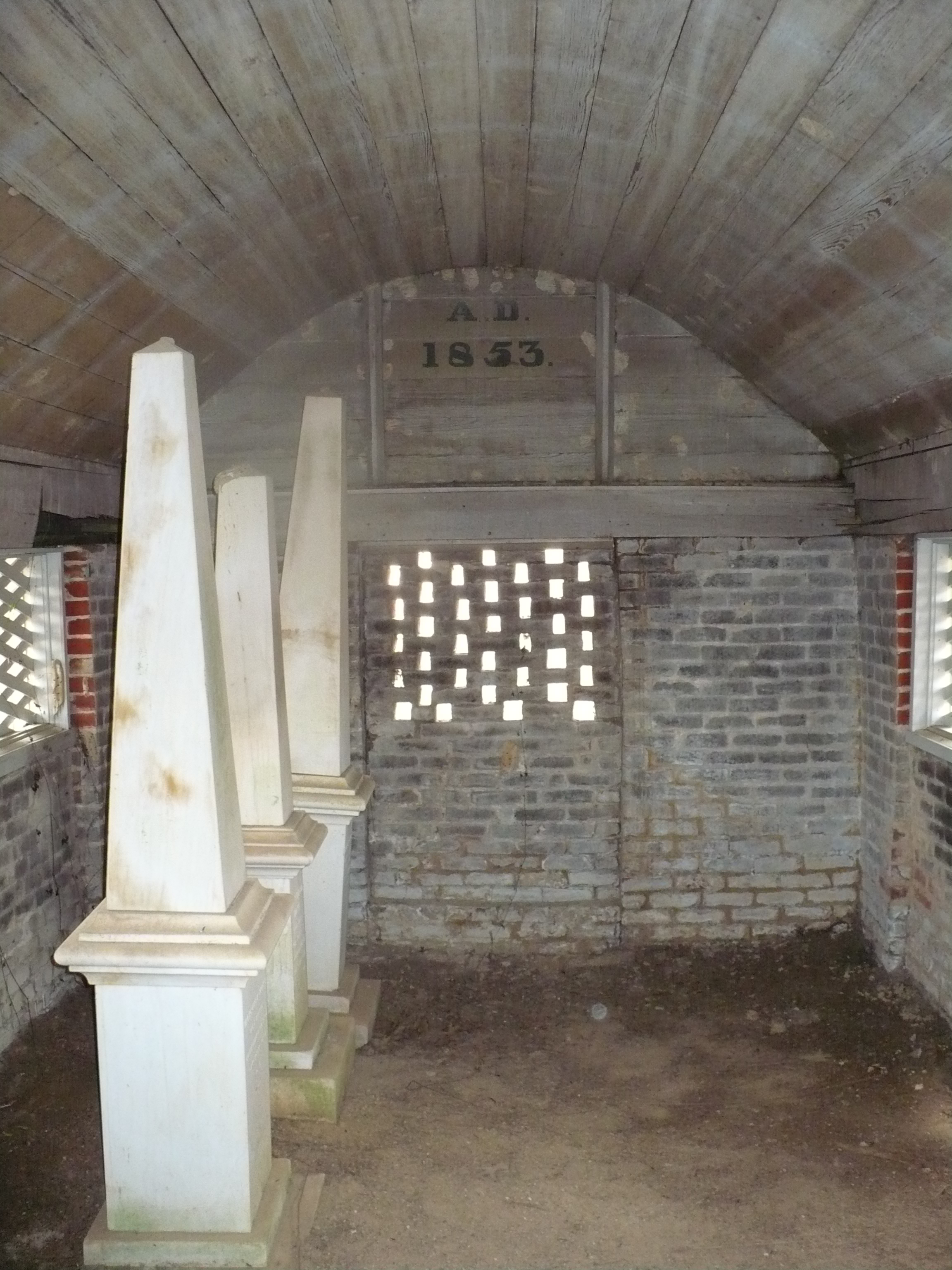
The interior

The shelter contains the graves of the following individuals:

- Archibald H. Hope (1823–1850)
- Margaret Hope (1797–1851)
- Jane A. Hope (1813–1852)
- John Allison Hope (1855–1856)
- John Hope (1791–1868)
- Sarah Jane Powell Hope (1829–1885)
