= Isaac Nettles Gravestones =

Historic cemetery in Alabama

- U.S. National Register of Historic Places
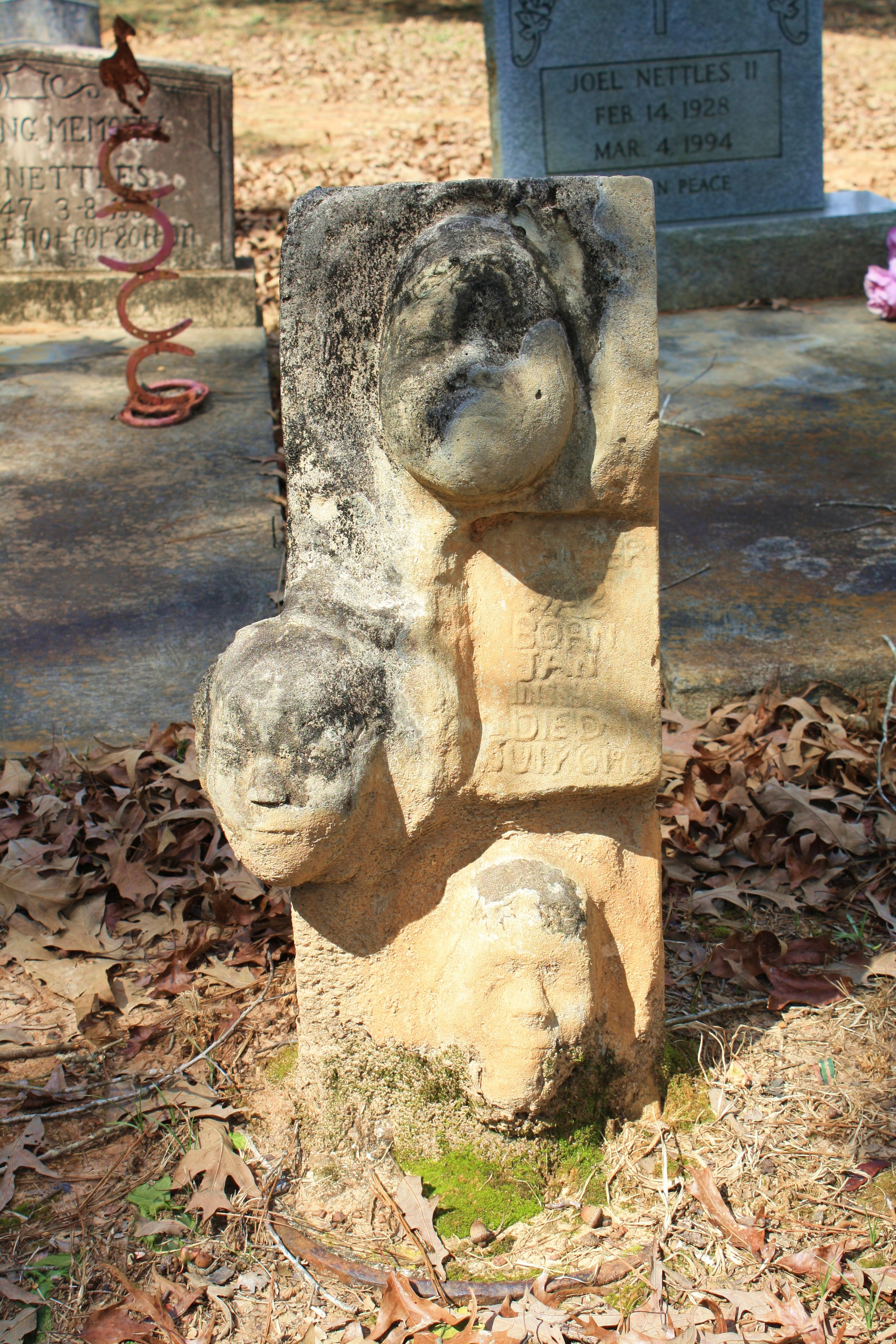
- Marker for "Mother" Cora Nettles

- Location within Alabama
- Nearest city: Carlton, Alabama
- Coordinates: 31°20′47″N 87°52′5″W
- Area: less than one acre
- Architect: Nettles, Isaac Sr.
- MPS: Clarke County MPS
- NRHP reference No.: 00000141
- Added to NRHP: February 24, 2000

The Isaac Nettles Gravestones are four unusual headstones in the Mount Nebo Baptist Church Cemetery near Carlton in rural Clarke County, Alabama, United States. Surveyed for the National Register of Historic Places' Clarke County Multiple Property Submission, they were added to the register on February 24, 2000.

== History ==
Mount Nebo Baptist Church, a traditionally African American Baptist church, was established in the 19th century. The four Nettles markers are made of concrete and feature death masks, presumed by scholars to be of the people whose graves they mark. The gravestones of note are of Angel Ezella Nettles (death 1940), Selena (sometimes spelled Celina) Nettles (1800s–January 1940), Korean (sometimes spelled Cora) Nettles (January 1859–July 6, 1933), and Manul Burell (?–August 9, 1946). The marker for Selena Nettles was greatly damaged in 1979 during Hurricane Frederic, and what once displayed her upper torso, is now only a gravestone base.

They are attributed to Isaac "Ike" Nettles, a local man who created them between 1933 and 1946. When surveyed in 2000 the markers had not weathered well, with only the most ornate one, with three individual masks on one marker, in good condition.

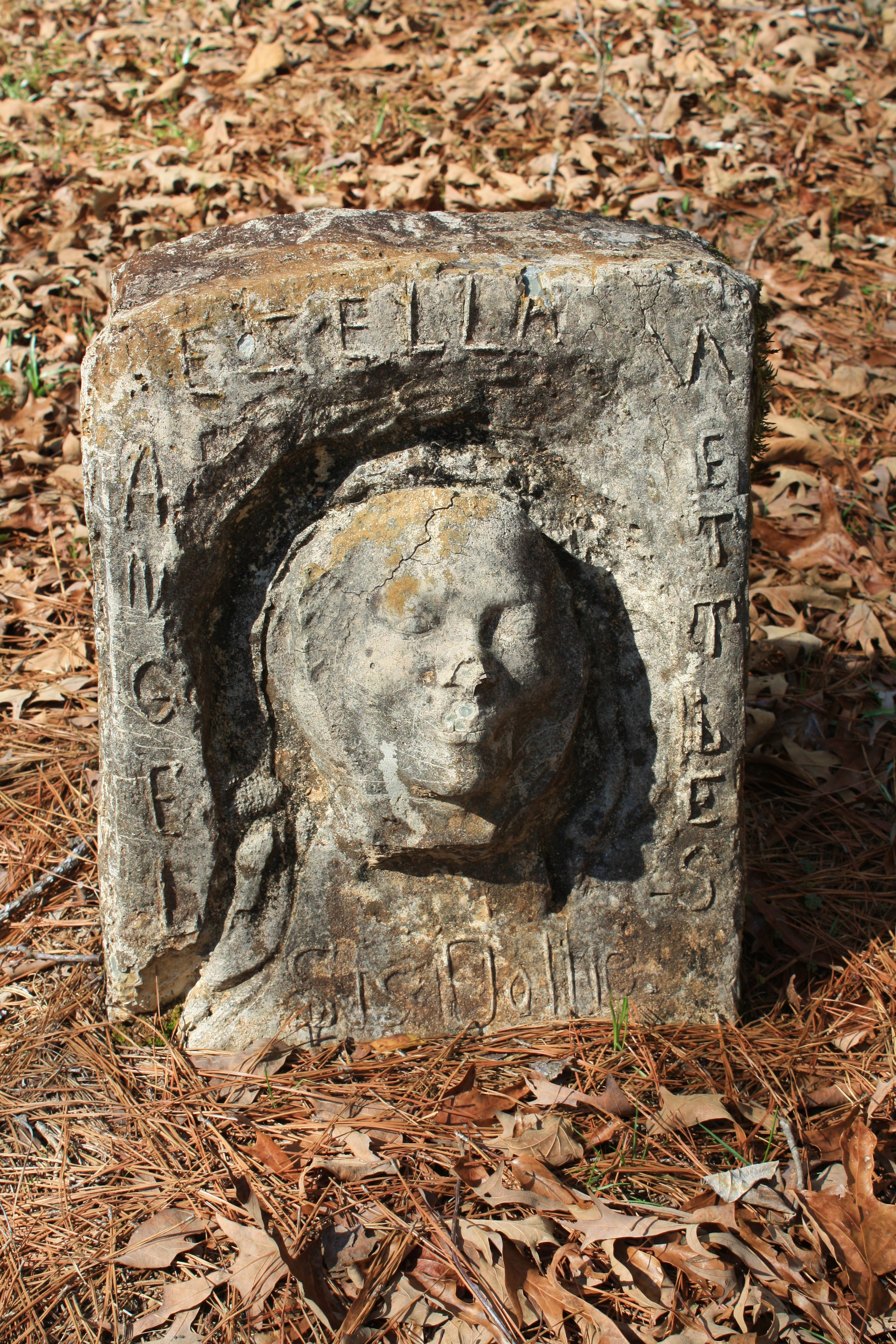
Marker for Ezella Nettles, inscribed with "Angel" and "Sis Dollie"

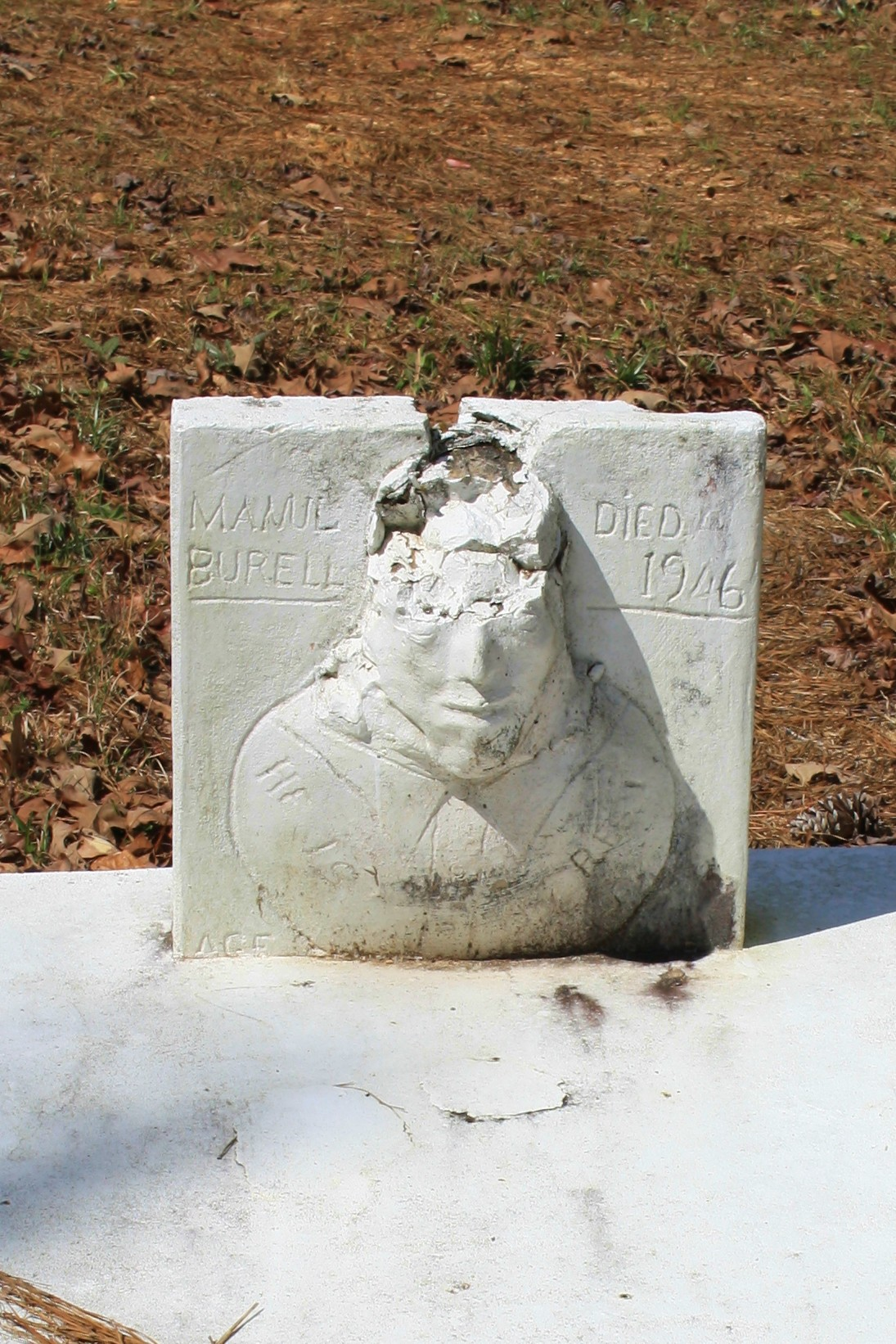
Broken marker for Manul Burell, died 1946

== See also ==
- Basket Creek Cemetery
