= Ahavas Chesed Cemetery =

Jewish cemetery in Mobile, Alabama

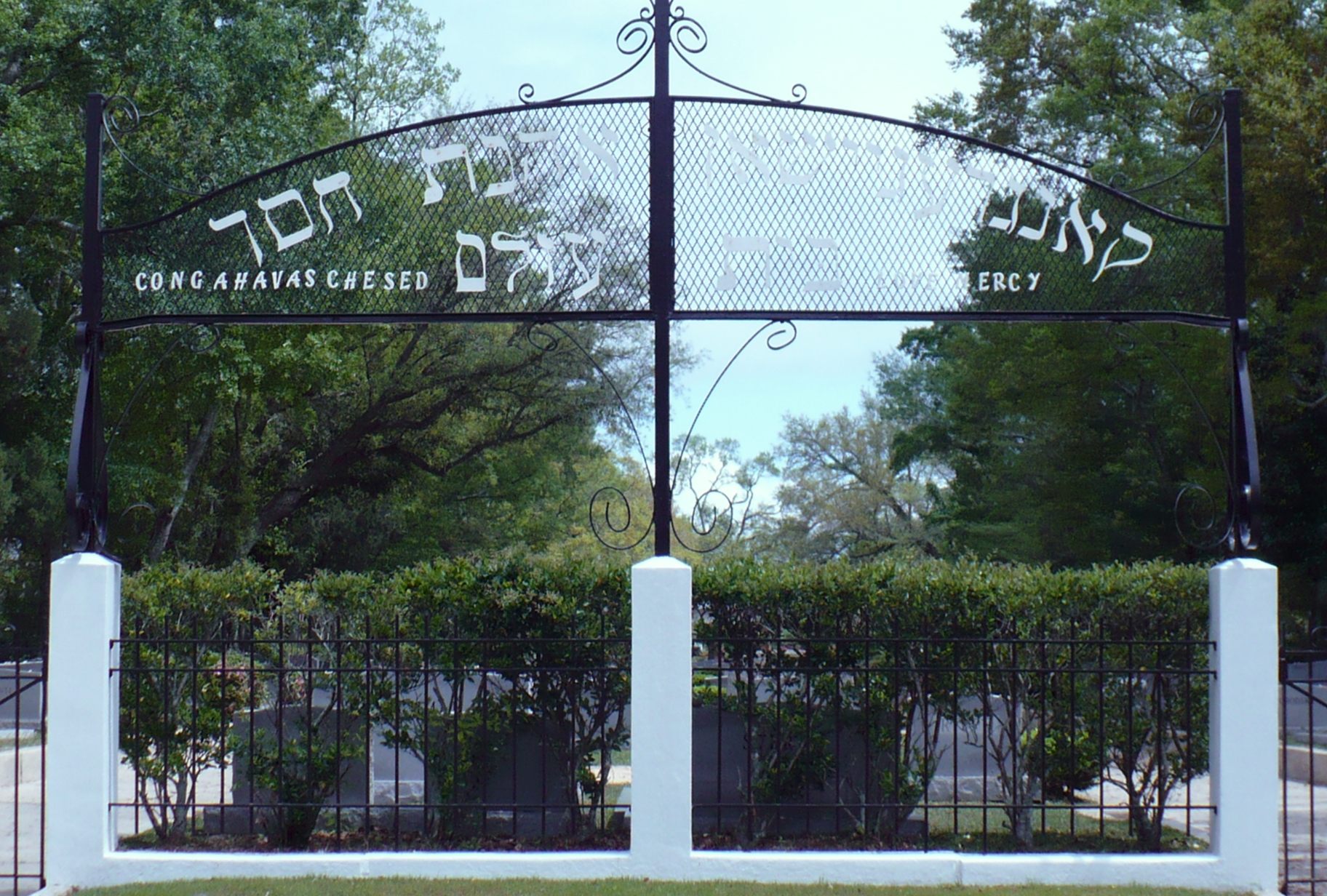
- The entrance gates to Ahavas Chesed Cemetery.
- Interactive map of Ahavas Chesed Cemetery

Details
- Established: 1898
- Location: Mobile, Alabama
- Country: United States
- Coordinates: 30.6708°N 88.0622°W
- Type: Private
- Owned by: Congregation Ahavas Chesed
- Size: 2 acres (0.8 ha)

Ahavas Chesed Cemetery, is a historic Jewish cemetery located in Mobile, Alabama, United States. It was established by the Ahavas Chesed congregation in 1898. It covers about 2 acres (0.81 ha) of land in a narrow strip that adjoins the Sha'arai Shomayim Cemetery.

== History ==
The late 19th century saw an influx of Russian and Eastern European Orthodox Jews (now Conservative) to Mobile, joining the well-established Reform Jewish community, started by German Jewish immigrants to the city. The newcomers began meeting in the home of Jacob Levinson in 1894 and called themselves Ahavas Chesed, or "Love of Kindness." They purchased a site for burials on September 29, 1898, adjacent to the Sha'arai Shomayim Cemetery of the Reform congregation, where their dead could be buried with stricter adherence to ancient Jewish custom than is practiced by other congregations.

The group converted a home at the corner of Conti and Warren Streets into a synagogue in 1908 and by 1911 had built a new building on that same site. The congregation moved to a new synagogue on Dauphin Street in 1956 and then moved again in 1990 to their present location on Regents Way.

The congregation of Ahavas Chesed utilize a chevra kadisha. The dead are not embalmed prior to interment; instead, the preparers ritually wash the body within a few hours after death and clothe it in simple white garments. The body is placed in a simple wooden coffin, which is kept closed at the funeral service. In the cemetery, the headstones are all roughly the same size, to show equality in the eyes of God.
