= John D. New =

United States Marine and Recipient of the Medal of Honor

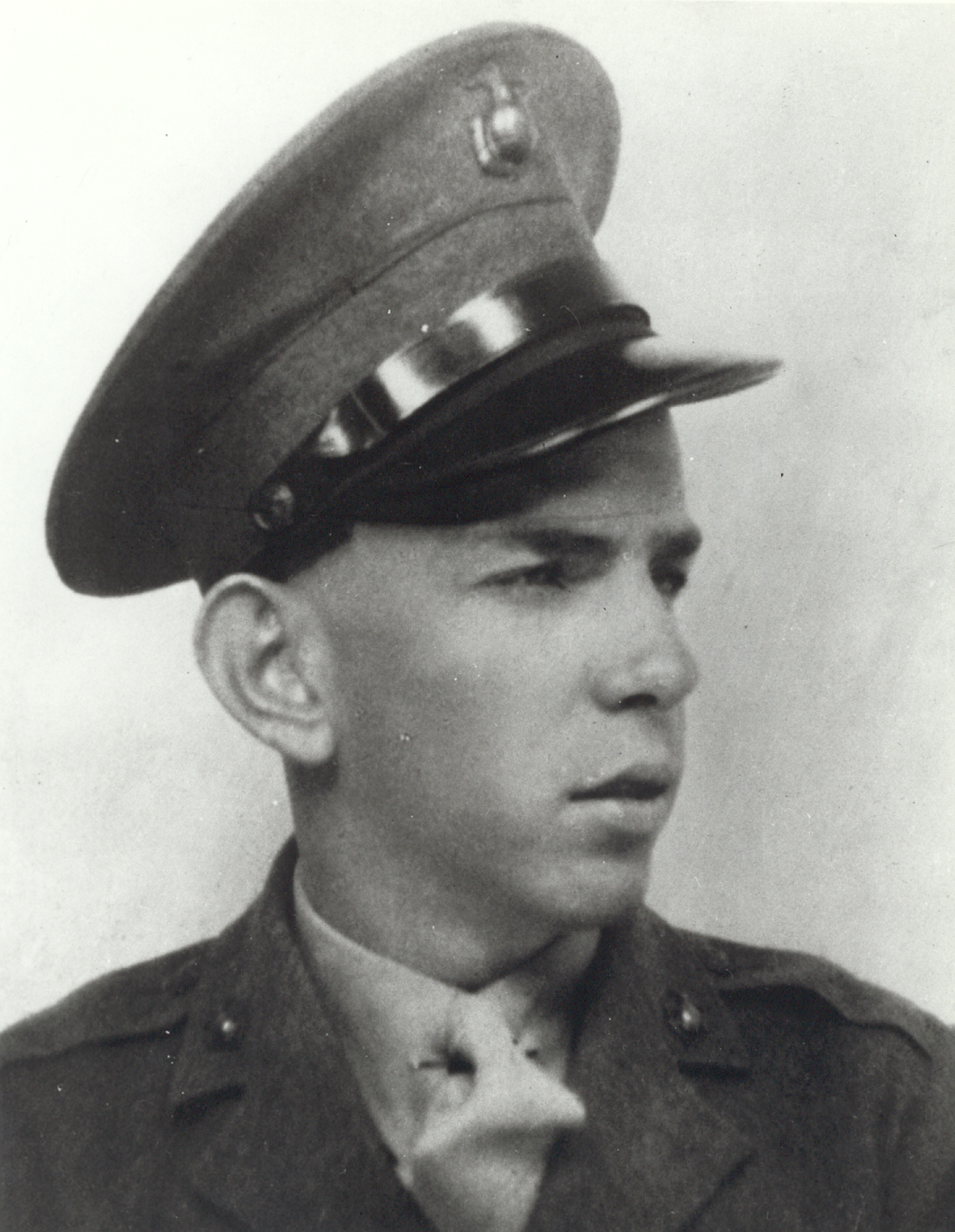
- Private First Class John Dury New, United States Marine, World War II Medal of Honor recipient
- Born: August 12, 1925; Mobile, Alabama, US
- Died: September 25, 1944 (aged 19); Peleliu, Palau Islands
- Burial place: Mobile National Cemetery, Mobile, Alabama
- Military career
- Allegiance: United States
- Branch: United States Marine Corps
- Service years: 1941–1944
- Rank: Private First Class
- Units: 2nd Battalion, 7th Marines, 1st Marine Division
- Conflicts: World War II: Guadalcanal campaign; Battle of Cape Gloucester; Battle of Peleliu
- Awards: Medal of Honor; Purple Heart

John Dury New (August 12, 1925 – September 25, 1944) was a United States Marine who for his gallantry in action at the cost of his life on Peleliu, posthumously received the Medal of Honor.

== Biography ==
New was born to Jesse James New and Mary Magdalene Gambrel in Mobile, Alabama, and attended St. Joseph's Parochial School and the public schools of that city.

He enlisted in the United States Marine Corps on December 8, 1941, the first Mobile man to enlist after Pearl Harbor. On December 12, 1941, he joined the 4th Recruit Battalion at the Marine Corps Recruit Depot Parris Island, South Carolina, and following recruit training served at Quantico, Virginia.

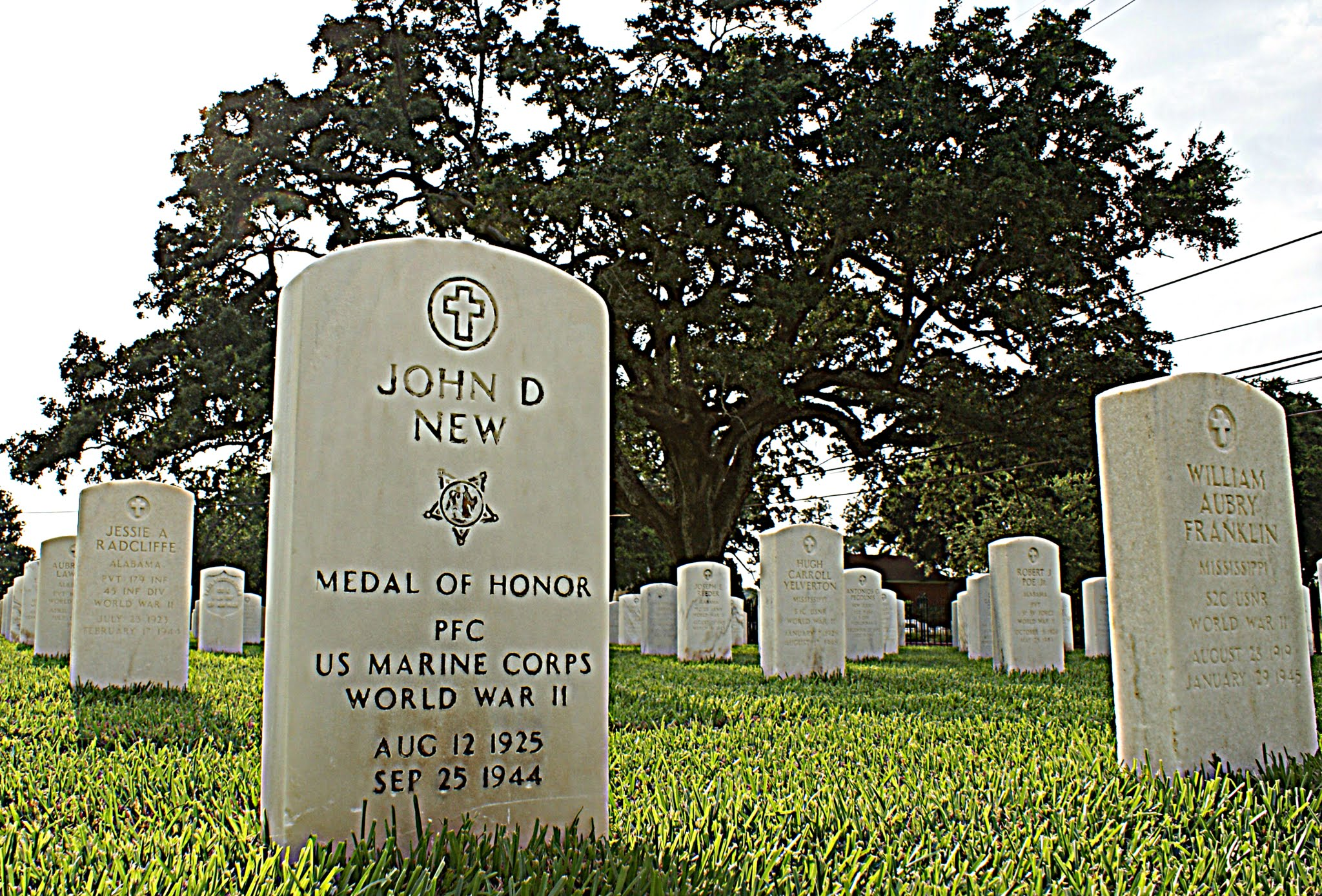
Grave of PFC John D. New at the Mobile (Alabama) National Cemetery

In September 1942, Private New joined the 4th Replacement Battalion, Fleet Marine Force, Training Center, at San Diego, California. He sailed for duty overseas the following month, and took part in the Guadalcanal campaign as a member of 2nd Battalion, 7th Marines, 1st Marine Division. He shared in the Presidential Unit Citation awarded the Division on Guadalcanal. He later took part in the seizure and occupation of Cape Gloucester, New Britain, and in the defense of the airfield in the vicinity of Cape Gloucester.

Promoted to private first class in April 1944, he moved from Cape Gloucester to Pavuvu, Russell Islands, to Guadalcanal, and on September 15, 1944, sailed for Peleliu in the Palau Islands. Nine days later, he was killed in action on Peleliu when he flung himself on an enemy hand grenade to save the lives of two comrades.

The Medal of Honor, awarded PFC New posthumously, was presented to his father.

Initially buried in the U.S. Armed Forces Cemetery on Peleliu, PFC New's remains were reinterred in the Mobile National Cemetery, Mobile, Alabama, in 1948. His grave can be found in section 7-2147.

== Medal of Honor citation ==
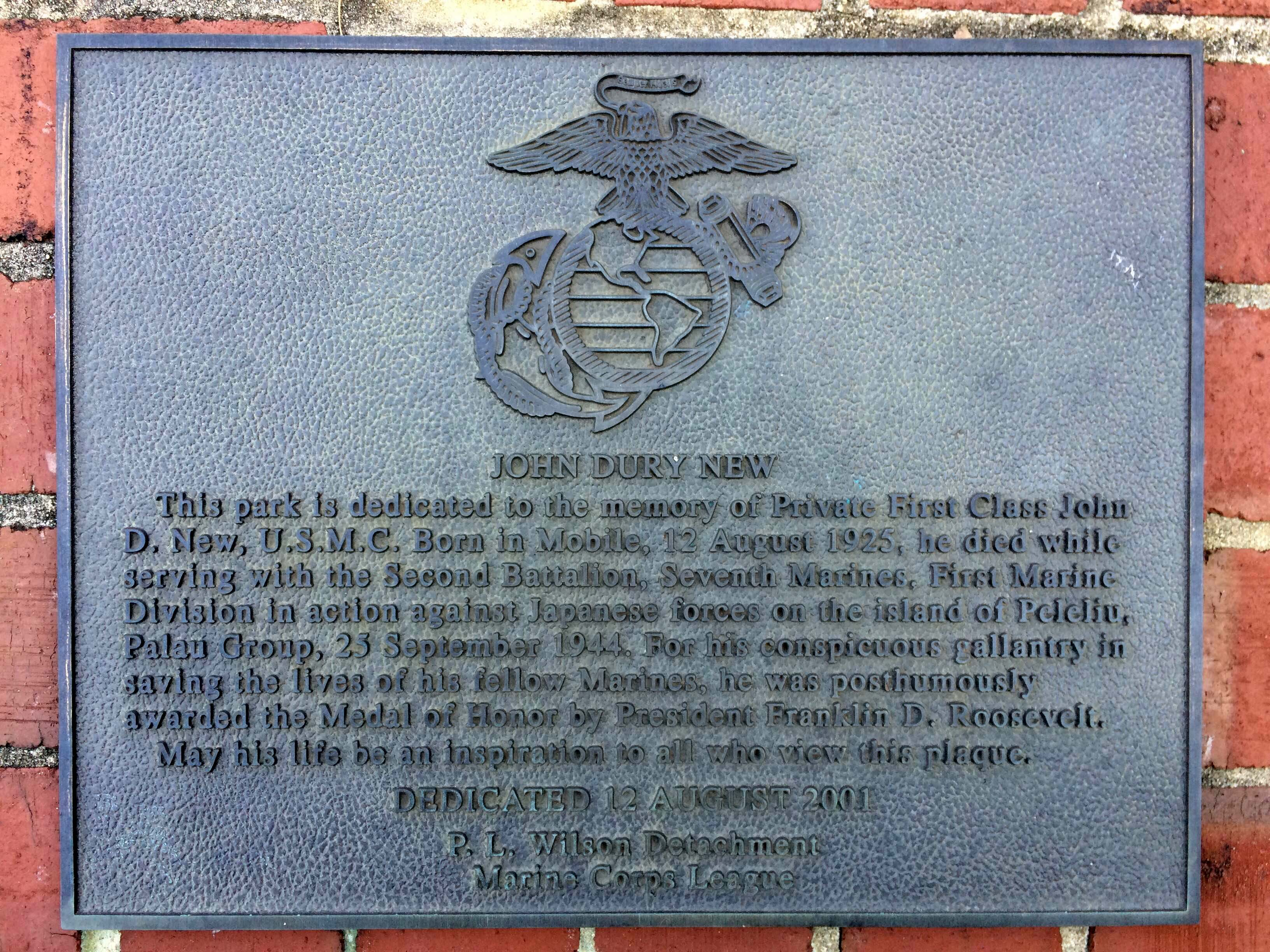
Photograph of Memorial Plaque for PFC John D. New, USMC, in Medal of Honor Park, Mobile, Alabama

The President of the United States takes pride in presenting the MEDAL OF HONOR posthumously to

PRIVATE FIRST CLASS JOHN D. NEW
UNITED STATES MARINE CORPS

for service as set forth in the following CITATION:

"For conspicuous gallantry and intrepidity at the risk of his own life above and beyond the call of duty while serving with the Second Battalion, Seventh Marines, First Marine Division, in action against enemy Japanese forces on Peleliu Island, Palau Group, 25 September 1944. When a Japanese soldier emerged from a cave in a cliff directly below an observation post and suddenly hurled a grenade into the position from which two of our men were directing mortar fire against enemy emplacements, Private First Class New instantly perceived the dire peril to the other Marines and, with utter disregard for his own safety, unhesitatingly flung himself upon the grenade and absorbed the full impact of the explosion, thus saving the lives of the two observers. Private First Class New's great personal valor and selfless conduct in the face of almost certain death reflect the highest credit upon himself and the United States Naval Service. He gallantly gave his life for his country."

/S/ FRANKLIN D. ROOSEVELT

== Awards and decorations ==

1st row	Medal of Honor		Purple Heart
2nd row	Combat Action Ribbon	Presidential Unit Citation	Marine Corps Good Conduct Medal
3rd row	American Campaign Medal	Asiatic-Pacific Campaign Medal with 2 Campaign stars	World War II Victory Medal

== Further Honors ==
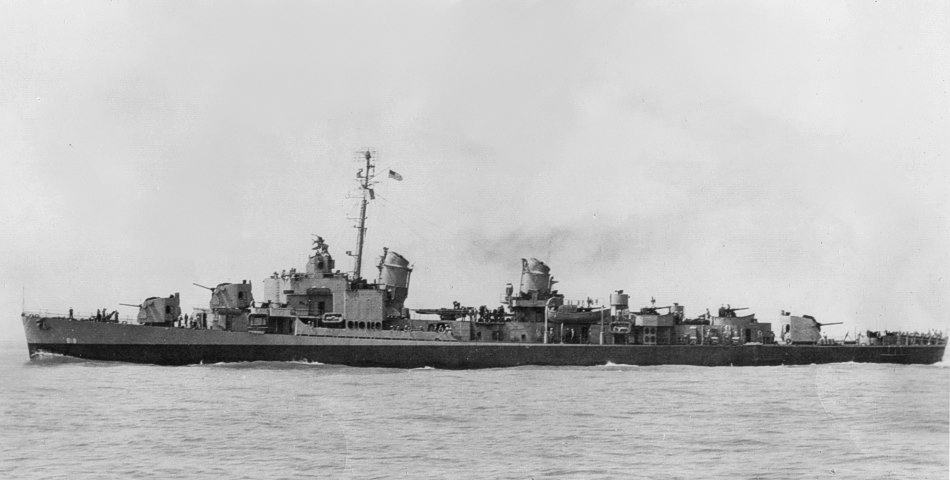
USS New (DD-818) in April 1946

In 1946, the U.S. Navy commissioned the destroyer USS New (DD-818), named in honor of New. The city of Mobile, Alabama, renamed its Cottage Hill Park as "Medal of Honor Park" in memory of New in August 2001.

== See also ==
- List of Medal of Honor recipients
