= Sha'arai Shomayim Cemetery =

Jewish cemetery in Mobile, Alabama

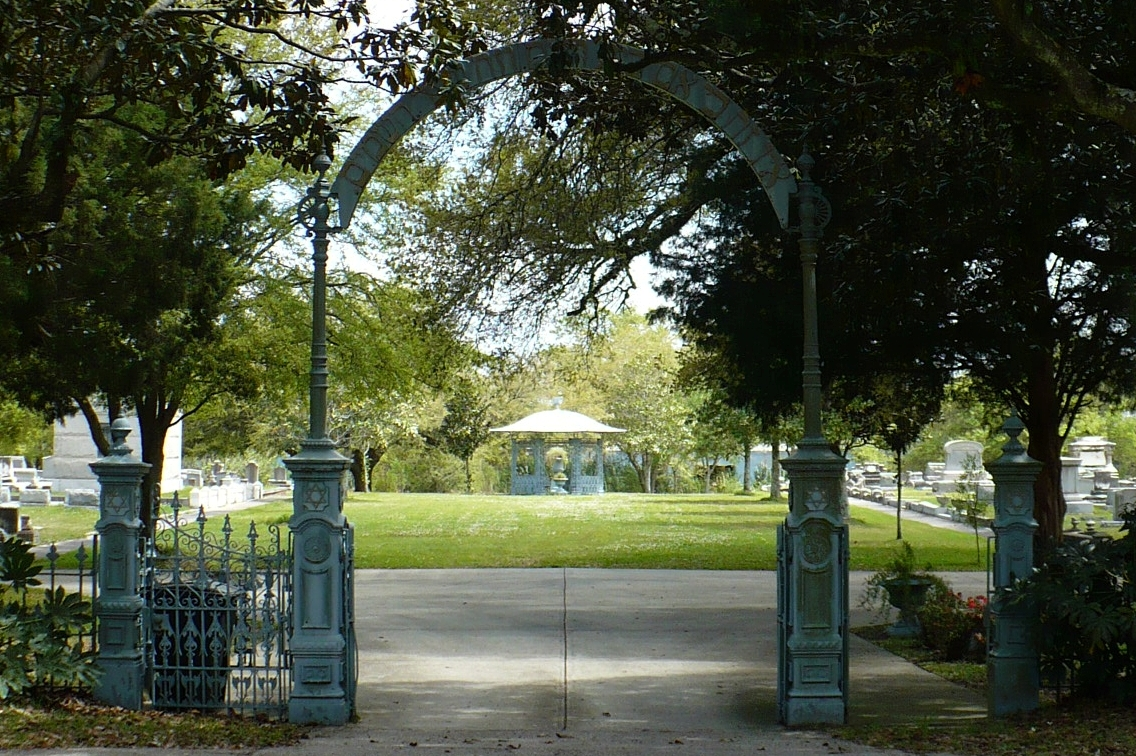
- The entrance gate to Sha'arai Shomayim.
- Interactive map of Sha'arai Shomayim Cemetery

Details
- Established: 1876
- Location: Mobile, Alabama
- Country: United States
- Coordinates: 30.67161°N 88.06143°W
- Type: Private
- Owned by: Congregation Sha'arai Shomayim
- Size: 15 acres (6.1 ha)
- Find a Grave: Sha'arai Shomayim Cemetery

Sha'arai Shomayim Cemetery, also known as the Reformed Temple Jewish Cemetery, is a historic Jewish cemetery located in Mobile, Alabama, United States. It was established by Congregation Sha'arai Shomayim in 1876 after their previous cemetery, Jewish Rest in the adjacent Magnolia Cemetery, was filled to capacity. The cemetery is situated on 15 acres (6.1 ha) and is surrounded by a 19th-century cast-iron fence and live oak trees. The entrance is through an ornamental arched gate inscribed with the congregation name in Hebrew letters.

== The congregation ==
Mobile's Reform Jewish community had its beginnings in the 1820s. The Sha'arai Shomayim congregation was the first Jewish congregation in Alabama and one of the oldest Reform congregations in the United States. It was made up of German Jewish immigrants. It was granted a charter by the state on January 25, 1844, with 52 families under the name of Sha'arai Shomayim Umaskil el Dol, or Gates of Heaven and Society of Friends of the Needy. They organized the first synagogue in Alabama, the St. Emanuel Street Temple, dedicated on December 27, 1846. They went on to build three more synagogues, after outgrowing the others. They moved to the Springhill Avenue Temple on September 2, 1955.

== History ==
The Sha'arai Shomayim congregation's first cemetery was a section in Magnolia Cemetery that was deeded to them by the city of Mobile on 22 June 1841. It would later come to be referred to as "Jewish Rest." The Jewish Rest section was full after only a few decades and led to the establishment of Sha'arai Shomayim Cemetery to the south of Magnolia.

The congregation purchased the land for the new cemetery from William and Caroline Leinkauf on March 17, 1876. They adopted a number of resolutions for governing the new cemetery and placed the lot prices at $50 per lot. The site was consecrated on December 3, 1876. The cemetery was laid out by Samuel Brown, the congregation's vice president. He had live oaks planted around the perimeter of the grounds, and in 1890 the ornamental cast-iron gate and fence was installed. The first burial was that of Israel Jones, on December 28, 1876. One of the most notable interments to ever take place in the cemetery was that of Esau Frohlichstein on May 14, 1914. He was one of 14 American soldiers killed in the U.S. siege of Veracruz during the Mexican Revolution. Thousands of Mobilians took part in his burial service and his marker is inscribed with a letter that he wrote to his parents the night before the attack. In part it reads, "Don't be afraid if I get killed. For the old saying 'Rather die a hero than live a coward' will land at Vera Cruz in about four hours."

The grave plots within the site are laid out in an east–west configuration with paved lanes running between them. A lawn-covered central avenue divides the cemetery and features a large cast-iron gazebo in the center. Many elaborately carved headstones and mausolea fill the cemetery. The most elaborate markers represent the Ark of the Covenant with classical detailing, many examples are present within the grounds. Many other markers feature Hebrew inscriptions. The cemetery has a large number of mausolea, one of the most notable being the Eichold-Haas-Brown mausoleum. It was designed by architect George B. Rogers and features many Middle Eastern design motifs and the Star of David.

== Gallery ==
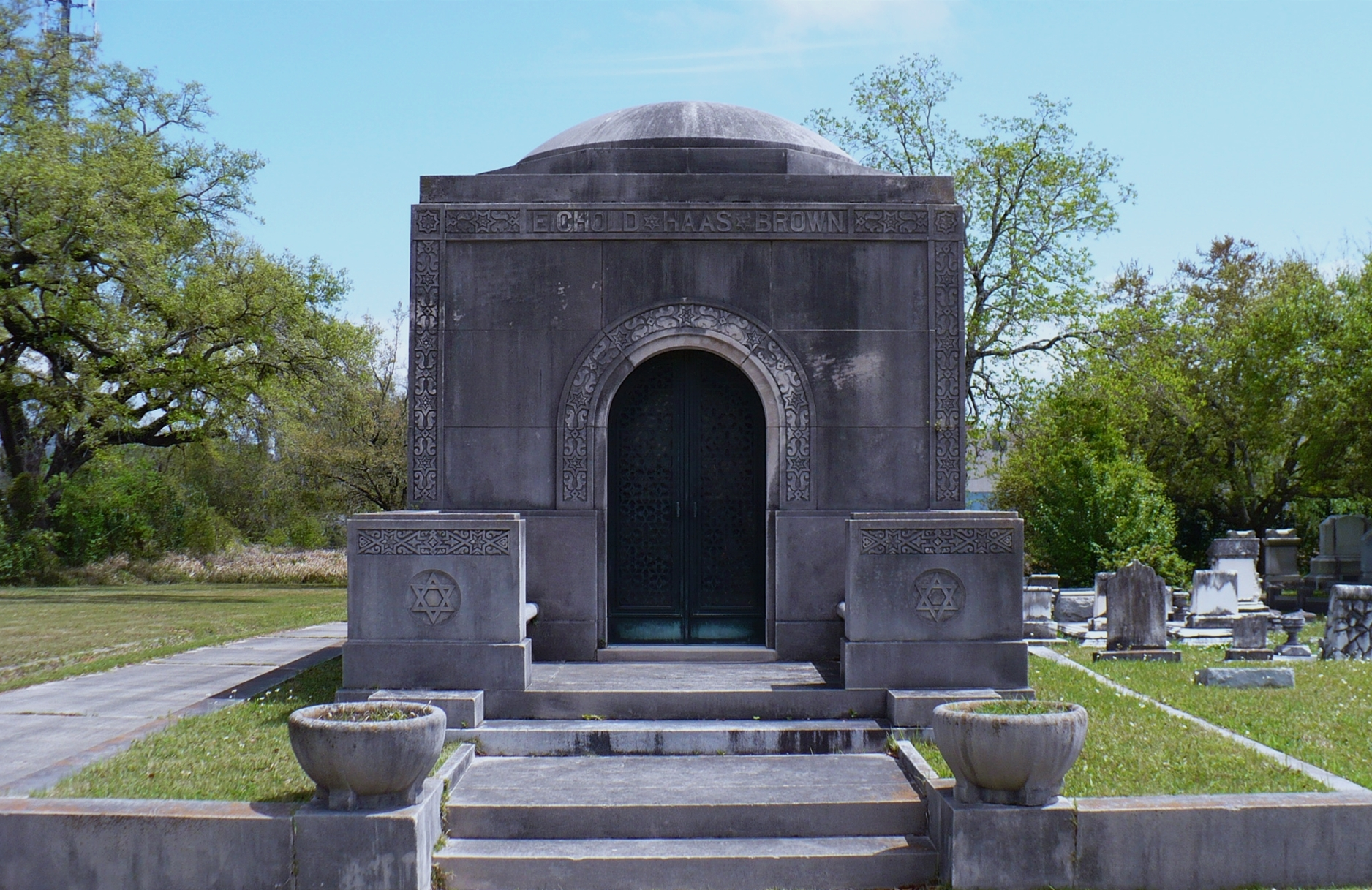
The Eichold-Haas-Brown mausoleum.

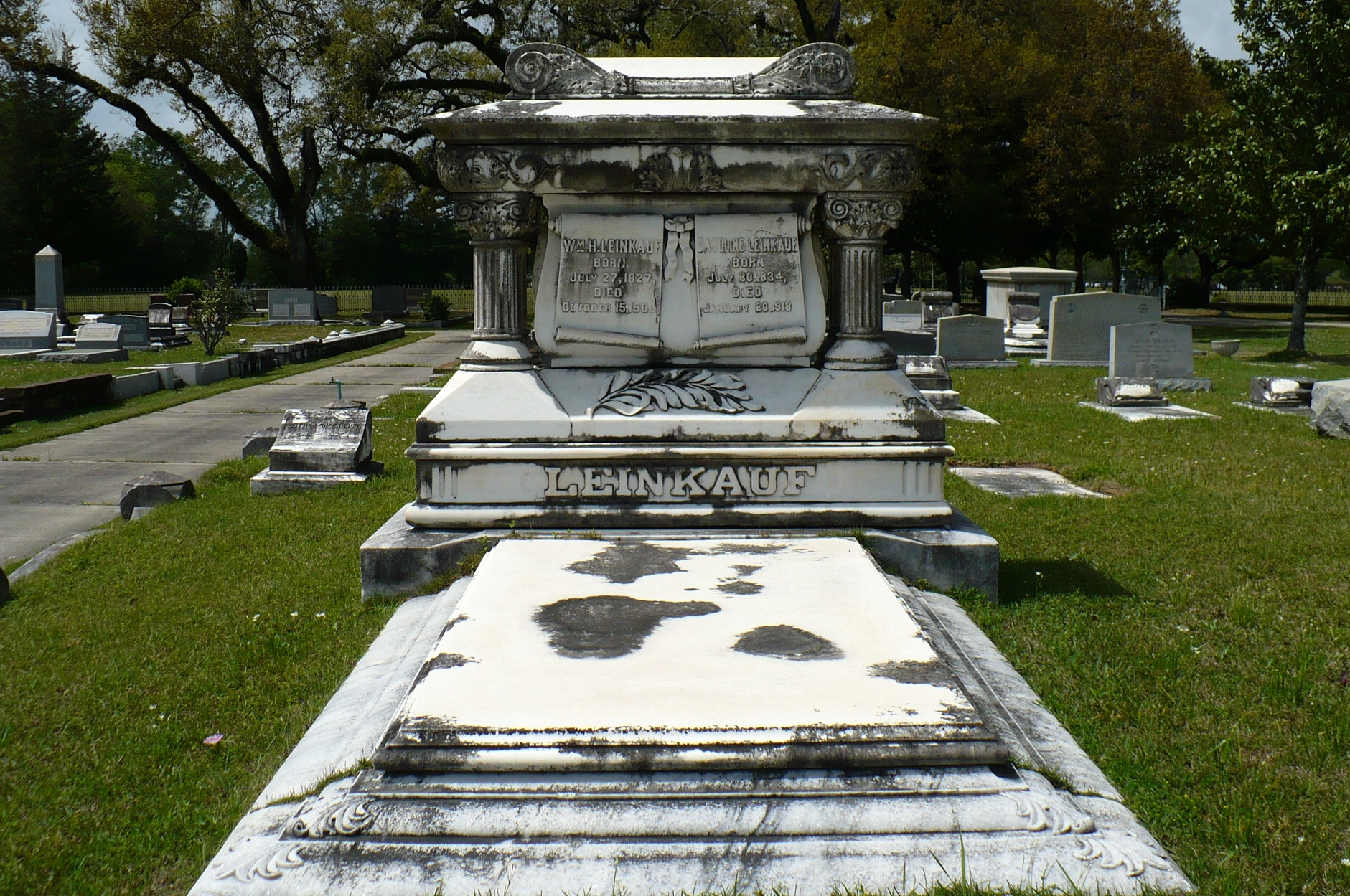
The Leinkauf monument, one of the many markers representing the Ark of the Covenant.

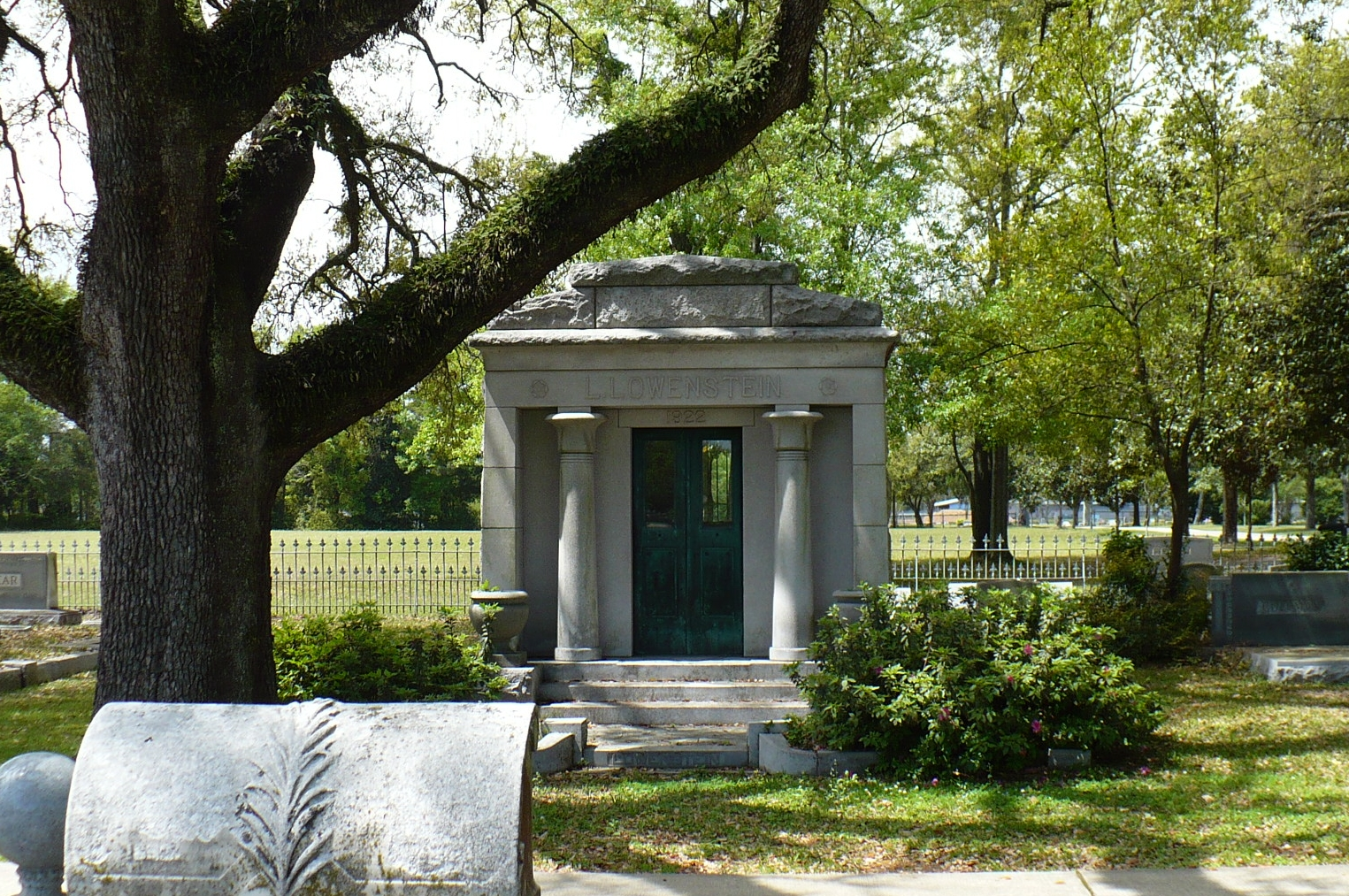
The Lowenstein mausoleum, an example of Egyptian Revival architecture.

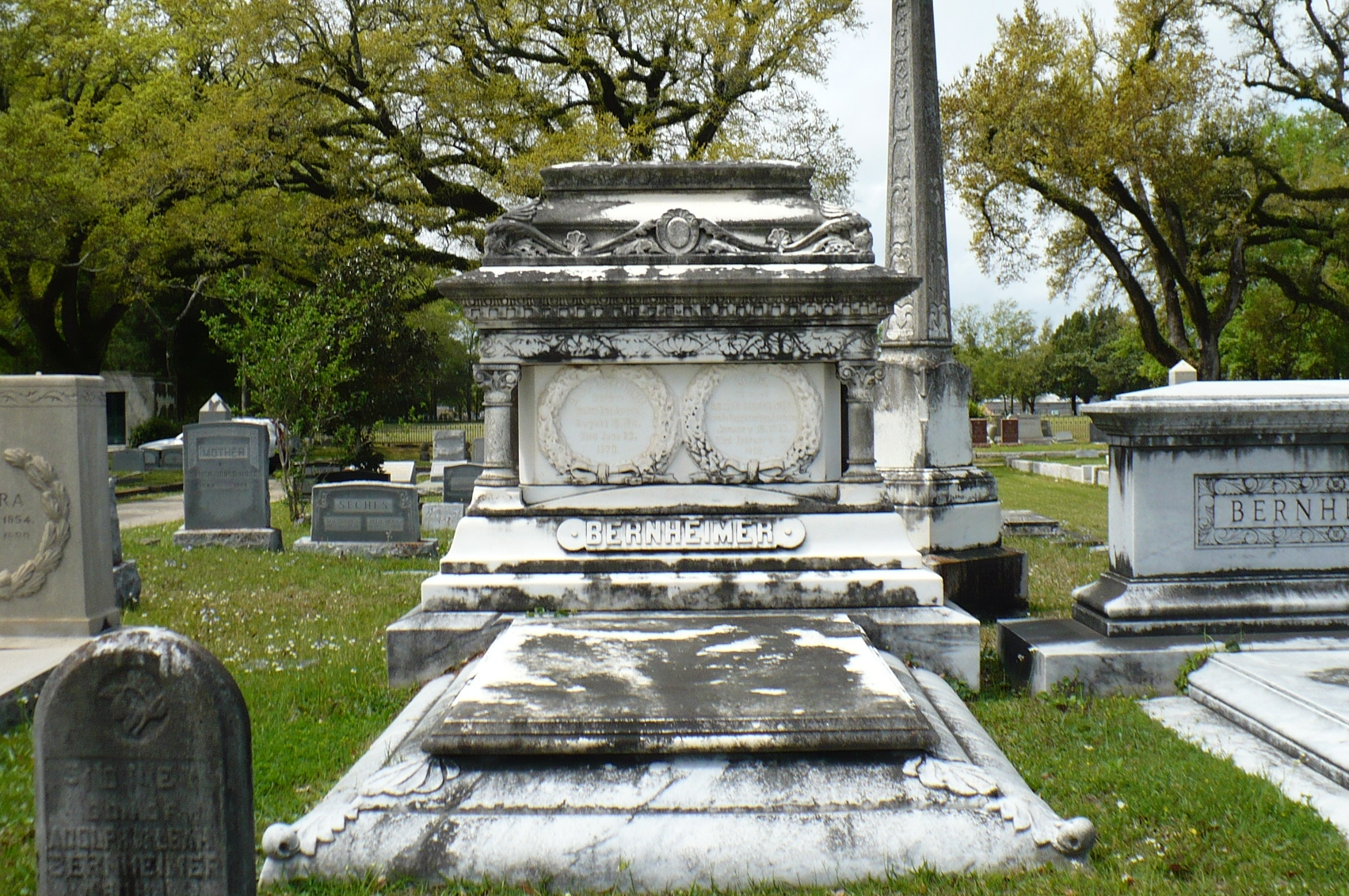
The Bernheimer monument.
