= Mobile National Cemetery =

Historic veterans cemetery in Mobile, Alabama

- Magnolia Cemetery including Mobile National Cemetery
- U.S. National Register of Historic Places
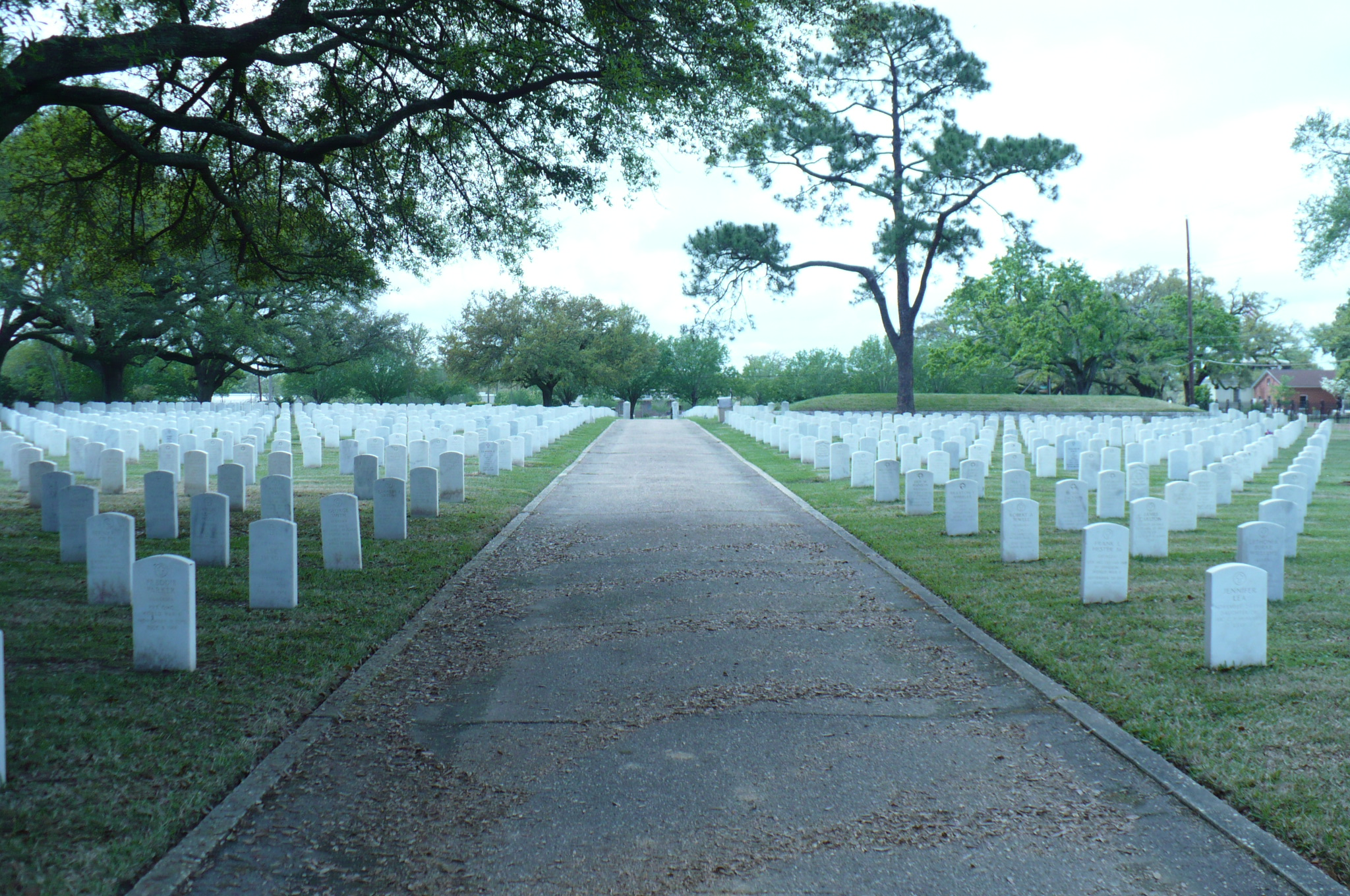
- A portion of Mobile National Cemetery.

- Location within Mobile, Alabama Location within Alabama Location within the United States
- Location: Mobile, Alabama
- Coordinates: 30°40′29″N 88°03′42″W
- Area: 91 acres (37 ha)
- Built: 1866
- NRHP reference No.: 86003757
- Added to NRHP: 13 June 1986

Mobile National Cemetery is a United States National Cemetery located in the city of Mobile, Alabama. It encompasses 5.2 acres (2.1 ha), and as of the end of 2005, had 5,326 interments. It is an annex to the larger Magnolia Cemetery. Mobile National Cemetery is administered by Barrancas National Cemetery in Pensacola, Florida, and is currently closed to new interments.

== History ==
Mobile National Cemetery was established in 1865, when Union troops occupied the city of Mobile after the Battle of Mobile Bay, during the Civil War. Initially, casualties of the battle were interred in a section of the city owned Magnolia Cemetery, but they quickly had a need for more space and a plot of 3 acres (1.2 ha) was granted to the Army by the city in 1866. By 1871, the cemetery had 841 interments, mostly soldiers whose remains were moved from other nearby battlefield sites.

Mobile National Cemetery was listed, along with the rest of Magnolia Cemetery, on the National Register of Historic Places on 13 June 1986.

== Notable monuments ==
- The 76th Illinois Volunteer Infantry Regiment Monument was erected in 1892 by the survivors of the Battle of Fort Blakeley.
- The Confederate Fortification Monument, a granite monument, was erected by the United Daughters of the Confederacy in 1940.

== Notable interments ==
- Private First Class John Dury New (1924–1944 †), US Marine Corps Medal of Honor recipient for action in World War II in the Palau Islands.

== See also ==
- United States Department of Veterans Affairs
