= Macedonia Baptist Church =

Macedonia Baptist Church may refer to:

- Macedonia Baptist Church (Denver, Colorado), listed on the National Register of Historic Places (NRHP)
- Macedonia Baptist Church (Holden, Louisiana), listed on the NRHP in Louisiana
- Macedonia Baptist Church (Bethesda, Maryland)
- Macedonia Baptist Church (Buffalo, New York), listed on the NRHP in Erie County, New York
- Macedonia Baptist Church (Burlington, Ohio)
- Macedonia Baptist Church (Cuero, Texas), listed on the NRHP in Texas
- Macedonia Baptist Church (Clarendon County, South Carolina), burned down by members of the KKK in 1996
