= River Road Moses Cemetery (Bethesda, Maryland) =

Historic African-American cemetery in Bethesda, Maryland, United States

- Interactive map of River Road Moses Cemetery

Details
- Established: 1911 (formal purchase); in local use earlier
- Closed: last documented burial 1935; property sold 1958
- Location: Vicinity of 5401 Westbard Avenue, Bethesda, Maryland
- Country: United States
- Coordinates: 38.96459°N 77.10587°W
- Type: African-American benevolent-society burial ground
- Owned by: Housing Opportunities Commission of Montgomery County (site owner)
- Size: Approximately 1 acre (0.40 ha)
- No. of interments: Up to 200 or more (estimated)

The River Road Moses Cemetery (also recorded as Moses African Cemetery, White's Tabernacle #39 Cemetery, Friendship Moses Cemetery, and Macedonia Baptist Cemetery) is a historic African-American burial ground in the Westbard area of Bethesda, Montgomery County, Maryland, United States. Established as the cemetery of a Black mutual-aid lodge of the Ancient United Order of the Sons and Daughters, Brothers and Sisters of Moses, and serving the River Road freedom colony, the cemetery holds an estimated 200 or more burials, including an African-American Civil War veteran; the site now lies beneath the asphalt parking lot of the Westwood Tower apartment complex.

Since the mid-2010s the cemetery has been the focus of one of the most prominent African-American burial-ground preservation disputes in the United States, generating sustained protest, county-commissioned investigations, and litigation that reached the Supreme Court of Maryland, which held in 2024 that the site "was a historic Black burial place" in which human remains likely remain interred, and that Maryland's common law protects burial places.

== Community background ==
The cemetery served the African-American community established along River Road in southwestern Bethesda beginning in 1869, in the generation after emancipation; the settlement — known as Graysville, and derisively as Crow Hill — comprised roughly two dozen households by 1880 and persisted until suburban redevelopment displaced its residents in the 1950s and 1960s. The community and its institutions, including Macedonia Baptist Church, are documented in a 2022 National Park Service historic resources study of African-American communities along the Chesapeake and Ohio Canal.

== White's Tabernacle No. 39 ==
White's Tabernacle No. 39 was a lodge of the Ancient United Order of the Sons and Daughters, Brothers and Sisters of Moses, one of the Black fraternal benevolent societies that proliferated in the Washington region after the Civil War. Formed in the 1880s in the Tenleytown section of Washington, D.C., and incorporated there in 1910, the lodge defrayed members' burial costs, assisted the sick, and organized community celebrations such as Emancipation Day parades. According to descendants of its sister lodge, Morningstar Tabernacle No. 88 of Cabin John, White's Tabernacle sold its original Tenleytown burial ground to the Chevy Chase Land Company in 1910 before acquiring the River Road property.

== Establishment and use ==
Montgomery County cemetery documentation indicates that the site likely served as a burial ground for the local African-American community even before 1911, when White's Tabernacle No. 39 purchased the property — a tract of roughly one acre, acquired in two parcels and, according to the Morningstar descendants, purchased from an heir of Charlotte Gray, the businesswoman for whom the Graysville community was named. The first recorded burial, in 1912, was that of Jeremiah Botts. Death certificates, funeral notices, and oral histories document active use of the cemetery between 1912 and 1935, and remains from the lodge's earlier Tenleytown cemetery may have been reinterred at the site. A county cemetery survey estimates up to 200 or more burials, including an African-American Civil War veteran.

== Sale and development ==
White's Tabernacle sold the cemetery property in 1958, during the period in which Black families were being displaced from River Road; the full terms of the sale, including any provision for relocating graves, are not documented, and no records have been located documenting reinterment of the remains elsewhere. Part of the land subsequently became the parking lot and driveways of the Westwood Tower apartment building, completed in 1968; the property later passed through several owners to the Housing Opportunities Commission of Montgomery County (HOC), the county's public housing agency. The cemetery site is recorded in the Montgomery County cemetery inventory as site no. 327, located in the vicinity of 5401 Westbard Avenue.

== Rediscovery and preservation movement ==
The cemetery's fate became a public controversy in the mid-2010s, when the burial ground was identified during the county's Westbard sector planning process. The Bethesda African Cemetery Coalition (BACC), which grew from the Social Justice Ministry of Macedonia Baptist Church, has since led a sustained campaign — including demonstrations at the site, at times multiple days each week — seeking to halt what it characterizes as the desecration of the cemetery and to consecrate the site with a memorial and museum. In December 2017 the church asked the Montgomery County Historic Preservation Commission to list the roughly one-acre cemetery tract in the county's atlas and index of historic sites, following the Planning Board's approval of a self-storage facility at 5204 River Road over church objections; the developer in that case agreed to convey land that could include part of the cemetery to the county parks system and to help fund an archaeological assessment. The campaign has drawn national attention, including support from the Rev. William Barber II and international press coverage.

=== Descendant perspectives ===
Interpretations of the cemetery's history are contested among descendant groups. In an August 2020 open letter, descendants of Morningstar Tabernacle No. 88 — whose members had close historical ties to White's Tabernacle No. 39 — publicly disagreed with the narrative put forward by BACC regarding the River Road cemetery, while affirming the site's history as an Order of Moses burial ground; the county's official chronology of the dispute records the letter.

== Investigations and memorialization planning ==
County-facilitated study of the site began in the late 2010s. At stakeholder meetings convened by the Montgomery County Planning Department, the parties agreed that the Ottery Group of Kensington, Maryland — the archaeological firm preferred by the church's representatives — would conduct archaeological work funded by the adjacent property owner, with the Planning Department funding an independent peer review by the anthropologists Rachel Watkins of American University and Michael Blakey of the College of William & Mary, the biological anthropologist known for directing research at the African Burial Ground National Monument in New York. The Ottery Group also prepared a preliminary historical assessment of the cemetery parcel, and the historian David S. Rotenstein produced a historic-preservation evaluation of the cemetery on behalf of the descendant community at the church's request; HOC has published both reports. In January 2019 HOC released a document supporting memorialization of the cemetery, and the county parks department has stated its commitment to memorializing the cemetery as part of the planned Willett Branch Greenway.

== Litigation ==
In August 2021, after HOC approved a letter of intent to sell the Westwood Tower property for about $51 million to the developer Charger Ventures, BACC and individual descendants — among them the pastor of Macedonia Baptist Church — sued in the Circuit Court for Montgomery County, arguing that Maryland law required court approval before a burial ground could be sold for another use. The circuit court granted a preliminary injunction preventing the sale and issued a writ of mandamus compelling HOC to proceed under the burial-grounds statute; the Appellate Court of Maryland reversed, and the Supreme Court of Maryland granted certiorari in 2023.

On August 30, 2024, the Supreme Court of Maryland ruled that Moses Cemetery "was a historic Black burial place" and that "it appears likely that human remains are still interred in the land today," while holding that the statute invoked (Business Regulation § 5-505) did not require HOC to obtain court permission before selling the property; the court further held that Maryland recognizes common-law protections for burial places and remanded the case so that the plaintiffs could pursue claims and remedies on that basis. Following the ruling, coalition members stated their intention to seek relief against continuing desecration and to pursue a memorial at the site.

On remand, the plaintiffs amended their complaint to assert claims for violation of the right of sepulcher and intentional infliction of emotional distress, seeking damages and injunctive relief; in February 2025 the circuit court ruled favorably on their motion for equitable relief. Reporting on the litigation has placed the damages sought at $40 million and noted that Charger Ventures withdrew from the purchase amid the controversy; in 2025 the dispute extended to efforts to halt subsurface drilling at the site.

== Legacy ==
The approved Westbard sector plan recommends recognizing and preserving the African-American heritage of the neighborhood through historical markers. Scholarly treatment of the cemetery includes a 2017 article in Washington History tracing the community and its contested burial ground, and the 2018 Rotenstein evaluation; the dispute has become a national reference point in debates over the protection of historic African-American cemeteries.

== See also ==
- River Road
- Macedonia Baptist Church (Bethesda, Maryland)
- African American cemeteries
- African Burial Ground National Monument
- Freedmen's town
