= Enviva =

Wood pellet producer in Maryland, USA

Enviva Inc.
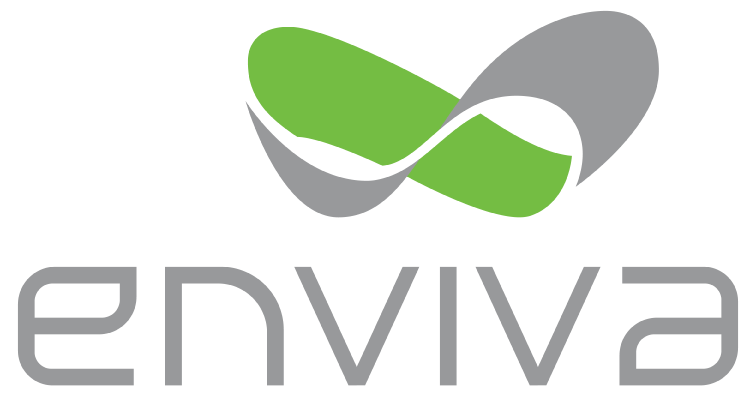

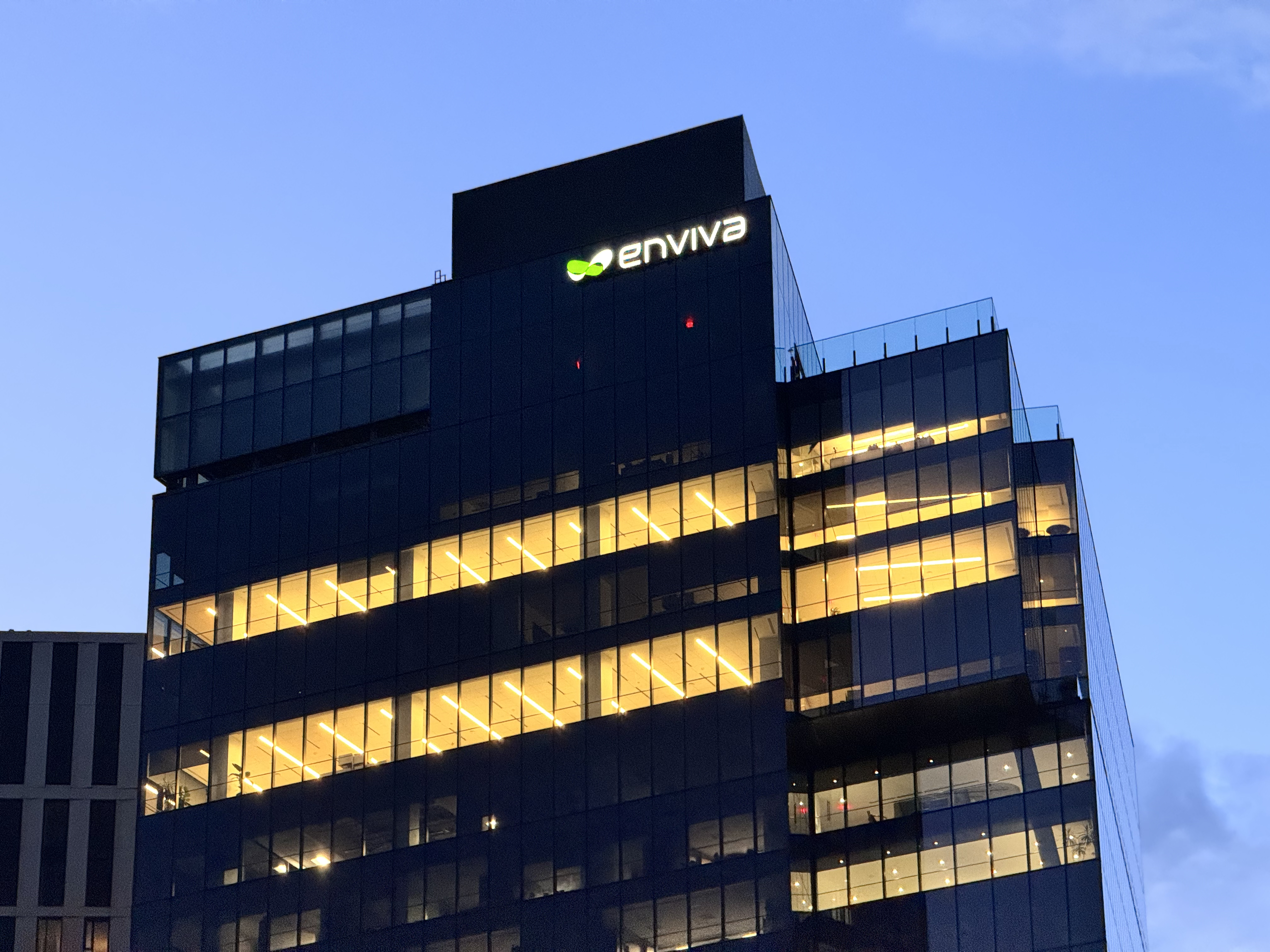
- Enviva's corporate headquarters in Bethesda, Maryland
- Trade name: Enviva
- Type: Public company
- Traded as: NYSE: EVA; Russell 2000 component
- Industry: Renewable energy
- Founded: 2004; 22 years ago
- Headquarters: Bethesda, Maryland, U.S.
- Products: Wood pellets
- Number of employees: 1,386 (December 31, 2022)
- Website: envivabiomass.com

Enviva Inc. is the world's largest producer of wood pellets used for energy production. The company has been the subject of controversy regarding its sustainability with an environmental group's analysis suggesting Enviva is responsible for 50 acres a day of clear-cut land and significantly increased CO_{2} production compared to coal per megawatt-hour.

Enviva was founded in 2004, conducted an initial public offering in 2015, and was traded on the New York Stock Exchange under EVA.

Enviva has five corporate offices worldwide, operates ten pellet plants in six states of the Southeast United States, employs 1,200 associates, and ships wood pellets worldwide from five terminal facilities in the United States.

On March 13, 2024, Enviva declared Chapter 11 bankruptcy.

== Leadership ==
- John Keppler, Chairman and chief executive officer
- Shai Even, Executive Vice President and Chief Financial Officer
- William Schmidt, Executive Vice President, Corporate Development & General Counsel
- Thomas Meth, Executive Vice President, Sales & Marketing
- Royal Smith, Executive Vice President, Operations
- Joseph ‘Nic” Lane, Executive Vice President, Human Capital
- Yana Kravtsova, Executive Vice President, Communications, Public & Environmental Affairs
- Norb Hintz, Senior Vice President and Chief Engineer
- John-Paul Taylor, Senior Vice President, Optimization & Origination Marketing
- Dr. Jennifer Jenkins, Vice President and Chief Sustainability Officer
- Chris Seifert, Vice President, EHS & Operations
- Wushuang Ma, Vice President and Treasurer
- Kate Walsh, Vice President, Investor Relations
- Chaminda Wijetilleke, Vice President, Strategy and Integration
- Oscar Young, Vice President and Corporate Controller
- James Geraghty, Vice President, Operations Finance
- Jens Wolf, Vice President, Commercial, General Manager Europe
- Craig Lorraine, Vice President, Customer Fulfillment

== Facilities ==
=== Corporate Offices ===
- Bethesda, Maryland (Headquarters)
- Berlin, Germany
- Raleigh, North Carolina
- Tokyo, Japan
- York, England

=== Wood pellet plants ===
- Ahoskie, North Carolina
- Amory, Mississippi
- Cottondale, Florida
- Greenwood, South Carolina
- Hamlet, North Carolina
- Northampton County, North Carolina
- Sampson County, North Carolina
- Southampton County, Virginia
- Waycross, Georgia

==== New planned wood pellet plants ====
- Epes, Alabama
- Lucedale, Mississippi

=== Ports ===
- Port of Chesapeake, Virginia
- Port of Mobile, Alabama
- Port of Panama City, Florida
- Port of Savannah, Georgia
- Port of Wilmington, North Carolina

==== New planned port ====
- Port of Pascagoula, Mississippi (Under construction)
