= River Road (community) =

Historic African-American freedom colony in Bethesda, Maryland

River Road (Graysville)
- Historic African-American community
- Nickname: "Crow Hill"
- Interactive map of River Road (Graysville)
- Coordinates: 38.96459°N 77.10587°W
- Country: United States
- State: Maryland
- County: Montgomery
- Census-designated place: Bethesda
- Settled: after the American Civil War (by the 1870s–1880s)

River Road, historically also known as Graysville (and derisively by white residents as Crow Hill), is an historic African-American community established by freedpeople and their descendants along River Road in Bethesda, Montgomery County, Maryland, United States, following the American Civil War. Centered in what is now the Westbard area of Bethesda, the community sustained homes, farms, churches, a school, and fraternal institutions for roughly a century before it was displaced by suburban commercial and residential redevelopment in the 1950s and 1960s. Its principal surviving institution is Macedonia Baptist Church at 5119 River Road.

Since the 2010s the community has been at the center of a widely reported dispute over the River Road Moses Cemetery (also called Moses African Cemetery or White's Tabernacle No. 39 Cemetery), an African-American burial ground now lying beneath the parking lot of the Westwood Tower apartment complex. In 2024 the Supreme Court of Maryland found that the site "was a historic Black burial place" and that human remains likely remain interred there, while holding that state law did not require court approval before the property's sale.

== History ==
=== Origins and settlement ===
Before the Civil War, the land along River Road formed part of a landscape of slaveholding farms and tobacco plantations in southwestern Montgomery County. After emancipation, freedpeople and their descendants acquired small parcels in the area and established a cluster of Black communities documented in the 1879 G.M. Hopkins atlas of Montgomery County and in the 1880 federal census. A 2022 National Park Service historic resources study of African-American communities along the Chesapeake and Ohio Canal identifies Graysville — near the line of the present Capital Crescent Trail — among the historic Black settlements of the Bethesda area, and records that some residents came from the nearby former Loughborough plantation on Little Falls Road.

The community took the name Graysville from the Gray family; local accounts associate the name in particular with Charlotte Gray, described in later reporting as a local businesswoman. Residents of the 1880 census-era community included the Kensilo, Turner, Smothers, and Knowland families, and early twentieth-century landowners on River Road included John Burley, who had been enslaved locally before emancipation. The land itself was low-lying and swampy — cheap because it was considered poor for agriculture — and white neighbors applied the derisive name "Crow Hill" to the settlement.

=== Community life ===
Through the late nineteenth and early twentieth centuries, residents combined small-scale farming with wage work, including labor in nearby quarries and in Washington, D.C. Church and mutual-aid institutions anchored community life. Macedonia Baptist Church, the community's surviving congregation, stands at 5119 River Road and is documented in the National Park Service study as an anchor institution of the historic settlement.

Fraternal benevolent societies were central to the area's Black communities. White's Tabernacle No. 39 of the Ancient United Order of the Sons and Daughters, Brothers and Sisters of Moses — a Black mutual-aid lodge formed in the 1880s in the Tenleytown section of Washington, D.C., and incorporated there in 1910 — defrayed burial costs, assisted sick members, and organized celebrations such as Emancipation Day parades. In 1911 the lodge purchased land on River Road — acquired, according to descendants of a sister lodge, from an heir of Charlotte Gray — for use as a members' burial ground.

=== Displacement and redevelopment ===
In the 1950s and 1960s, the assembly of land for large-scale commercial and apartment development in the Westbard area displaced the River Road community. Longtime residents and their descendants have described coercive and exploitative land transactions during this period; Harvey Matthews Sr., who grew up in the community on land now occupied by a Whole Foods Market, has recounted watching bulldozers arrive for the construction of the Westwood Tower Apartments in the 1960s. By the late twentieth century, nearly all physical traces of the residential community had been removed, with Macedonia Baptist Church remaining as its most visible surviving landmark.

== River Road Moses Cemetery ==
The River Road Moses Cemetery (Montgomery County cemetery inventory no. 327; also recorded as White's Tabernacle #39 Cemetery, Friendship Moses Cemetery, and Macedonia Baptist Cemetery) operated near River Road in the vicinity of 5401 Westbard Avenue. According to Montgomery Parks documentation, the site likely served as a burial ground for the local African-American community even before 1911, when White's Tabernacle No. 39 purchased the property; death certificates, funeral notices, and oral histories document active use between 1912 and 1935, and remains from the lodge's earlier Tenleytown cemetery may have been reinterred there. The first recorded burial, in 1912, was that of Jeremiah Botts. A county cemetery survey estimates up to 200 or more burials at the site, including an African-American Civil War veteran, and records that the cemetery site is covered by the asphalt parking lot of the Westwood Tower apartment building.

White's Tabernacle sold the cemetery property in 1958, during the period in which Black families were being displaced from River Road; the full terms of the sale, including any provision for relocating graves, are not documented. Part of the land subsequently became the parking lot of Westwood Tower, completed in 1968. No records have been located documenting reinterment of the remains elsewhere.

=== Dispute and litigation ===
The cemetery's treatment became a public controversy in the mid-2010s, when Montgomery County planning staff identified the burial ground during the Westbard sector planning process. The Bethesda African Cemetery Coalition (BACC), led by Marsha Coleman-Adebayo and associated with Macedonia Baptist Church, has since organized regular protests and legal action seeking protection and memorialization of the site, characterizing the redevelopment of the burial ground as desecration. The campaign has drawn national attention, including support from the Rev. William Barber II.

Interpretations of the cemetery's history are contested. In an August 2020 open letter, descendants of Morningstar Tabernacle No. 88 — a sister Order of Moses lodge in the Cabin John community of Gibson Grove, whose members had close historical ties to White's Tabernacle No. 39 — publicly disagreed with aspects of BACC's account of the River Road cemetery while affirming the site's history as an Order of Moses burial ground.

In 2021, BACC and individual descendants sued the Housing Opportunities Commission of Montgomery County (HOC), the property's owner, to prevent the sale of Westwood Tower to a private developer without judicial review of the burial ground. On August 30, 2024, the Supreme Court of Maryland ruled in Bethesda African Cemetery Coalition v. Housing Opportunities Commission of Montgomery County that Moses Cemetery "was a historic Black burial place" and that "it appears likely that human remains are still interred in the land today," while holding that the statute invoked by the plaintiffs (Business Regulation § 5-505) did not require HOC to obtain court permission before selling the property; the court further held that Maryland recognizes common-law protections for burial places and remanded the case so that the plaintiffs could pursue claims and remedies on that basis.

== Legacy ==
The approved Westbard sector plan recommends recognizing and preserving the African-American heritage of the neighborhood through historical markers. The cemetery controversy also contributed to county-level policy attention to burial-ground inventories and to the documentation of historic African-American cemeteries in Montgomery County's planning processes. Scholarly treatment of the community and its contested cemetery includes a 2017 article in Washington History and a 2018 historic-preservation evaluation of the cemetery by the historian David S. Rotenstein.

== See also ==
- Freedmen's town
