= ASCII Group =

Information technology company

The ASCII Group
- Type: Private
- Industry: Information technology
- Founded: 1984
- Founder: Alan Weinberger
- Headquarters: 7101 Wisconsin Avenue; Suite 1350; Bethesda, Maryland
- Area served: Global
- Key people: Alan Weinberger, CEO, chairman, founder; Jerry Koutavas, president, executive director; Doug Young, COO, senior vice president
- Number of employees: 10,000
- Website: ascii.com

The ASCII Group, Inc., is the oldest and largest group of independent information technology (IT) solution providers, systems integrators, managed service providers (MSP) and value added resellers (VAR). Founded in 1984, ASCII is the largest paying community of independent computer solution providers, system integrators, and valued added resellers in the world.

== History ==
The original ASCII business model was created in 1984 by Alan Weinberger who forged the network out of a failing franchise of software retail stores owned by Ashton-Tate, a major software publisher. 40 independent software retailers decided to join as a buying group and pay monthly fees to support their organization, in turn supporting each other and their programs for mutual benefit.

Debuting in 2000, ASCII holds 9 annual Success Summits each year throughout the United States and Canada. In 2015, ASCII partnered with TTR, Inc. and announced a support service for sales tax questions.

== See also ==
- ASCII
- ASCII art
