= Thomas Francis Edwards =

American serial killer (1944–2009)

- Born: 1944; Bethesda, Maryland, U.S.
- Died: February 14, 2009 (aged 65); California Medical Facility, Vacaville, California, U.S.
- Other names: "The Bethesda Butcher" "The Beltway Butcher"
- Convictions: Maryland: Parole violations California: Murder; Attempted murder
- Penalty: Maryland: Involuntary commitment California: Death

Details
- Victims: 3
- Span of crimes: 1970–1981
- Country: United States
- States: Maryland, California
- Date apprehended: September 28, 1981

Thomas Francis Edwards (1944 – February 14, 2009), known as The Bethesda Butcher, was an American serial killer. A long-time suspect in two murders committed along the Capital Beltway for which he was never tried, Edwards was instead convicted and sentenced to death for murdering a girl in California in 1981; he remained on death row until his death in 2009.

Three years after his death, he was linked via DNA to the two murders and positively identified as the killer.

== Early life ==
Thomas Francis Edwards was born in 1944 in Bethesda, Maryland, and was adopted at an early age by an affluent family who had one son, Terry. His father, a government official based in Washington, D.C., died from undisclosed causes in the late 1950s, after which his widowed mother moved the children to 5126 Manning Drive.

Shortly after his arrival, the 14-year-old Edwards started terrorizing the local children by walking on the streets with a black bullwhip and randomly attacking them. As he was fairly large for his age, few could oppose him, and he later switched to a shotgun and bow - despite this, there were no reported serious injuries. While the neighbors were initially tolerant of his behavior as they sympathized with Edwards' mother, this all changed in 1962.

One night, some of the girls in the Girl Scout troops were having a camp-out in the backyard of the Boesch family, among them a teenage Barbara Smeak. She was standing near one side of a tent when Edwards, brandishing a knife, grabbed her from behind, put his hand on her mouth and cut off her ponytail. He then slit the tent and ran away, but was quickly identified by one of the other girls and arrested soon afterwards after Smeak's mother filed a complaint. He was then interned at the Springfield State Hospital for a psychiatric evaluation and judged as capable to stand trial, but charges against him were dropped for unknown reasons.

=== Internment ===
On January 22, 1963, Edwards and two other youths attacked a bowling manager named Richard W. Robins - one of them attempted to hit him on the head with a blackjack, but Robins ducked and was instead hit in the shoulder. After he fell down, the trio stole a bag they believed to contain receipts, but only had a pair of bowling shoes.

This robbery went unsolved until September, when one of Edwards' accomplices was stopped for an unrelated offense and implicated him and the other youth. All three were then sent to a reformatory in Hagerstown, where, despite his size, Edwards was bullied by other teenagers.

In early 1964, he was transferred to the Patuxent Institution to undergo psychotherapeutic treatment. Due to patient confidentiality, little is publicly known about Edwards' time there, but the treatment was considered successful, leading to him being paroled to a halfway house in Baltimore in 1968. There, he befriended a man named Martin Salisbury, who would later recall that he considered Edwards to be a "genial and affable man" who was nicknamed "Teddy Bear" and was to be rather clever. Despite this, he also stated that the man suffered from an "intense sexual rage" aimed at women.

== Crimes ==
=== "Bethesda Butcher" murders ===
On January 16, 1970, 14-year-old Sherry Bristol Kennedy left her home in Potomac to visit a friend who was babysitting at an apartment near the Montgomery Mall Shopping Center. After having an argument over who was going to use the phone, Kennedy left and started walking back home. Somewhere along the Cabin John Creek Regional Park, she came across Edwards, who proceeded to abduct her before ultimately stabbing her seven times in the head with an ice pick, slashing her throat and shooting her with a Ruger pistol with .22 caliber rounds. He then abandoned her body under a bridge in a snowy ravine near the intersection of Cabin John Parkway and Clara Barton Parkway. She was found later that day, with the ice pick still lodged in her head.

Despite the violent nature of the murder, an autopsy conducted by coroner John G. Ball concluded that Kennedy had not been sexually assaulted. In an effort to generate tips, local authorities dressed up a mannequin in the victim's clothes and showed it on local television so it could possibly help a citizen recognize the girl and give information about her whereabouts. Due to the heavy fog and rain that had occurred on the day of her death, there was public speculation that Kennedy was possibly hitchhiking. A reward of $5,000 would later be offered for any information that would lead to an arrest.

Twelve days later, on January 28, the body of 33-year-old school teacher Catherine O'Brien Kalberer was found on the back seat of a neighbor's car right in front of her apartment in Bethesda - her throat had been slashed and she had suffered a total of 124 wounds to her chest and legs. The entire residence was smeared with blood, with a blood-stained knife being found in one of the rooms. Kalberer had been reported missing just a day prior, as she had failed to arrive at her new workplace at the Takoma Park Junior High School in the District of Columbia. The coroner would later reveal that Kalberer had most likely been hit on the back of the head while returning home from grocery shopping, after which she was dragged inside the apartment's kitchen and had her throat slashed with one of the knives. After this, the killer stabbed her six times in the abdomen and three times in the chest, leaving her to bleed to death. Even after this, he then dragged the body to the bedroom, where he continued slashing it for at least half an hour.

On February 2, 1970, 18-year-old FBI clerk Donna Sue Oglesby was found stabbed to death at her residential apartment in Alexandria, Virginia. She was found completely nude and with multiple stab wounds on her body, with a pair of three-inch sewing scissors lodged in one of the wounds. Due to the similarities in brutality and victim profile to the cases in Maryland, this led to public speculation that they were all related, despite reservations from authorities to link the Oglesby case to the others.

=== Second internment, release and move to California ===
In November, news media reported that an unnamed suspect was detained for the murders of Kennedy and Kalberer, with police claiming that fingerprints linked him to the crime. While his name went undisclosed at the time, it would later be revealed that the suspect was Edwards, who worked as a gas station attendant in the area. When his house in Bethesda was searched, police located various knives and guns - as this violated his parole conditions, he was re-interned at Patuxent. Despite these highly suspicious discoveries, he was never charged with the murders due to insufficient evidence.

Nonetheless, Edwards remained at Patuxent until 1977, when the state passed a new law that prohibited the detention of inmates with mental conditions for longer than their designated sentence, regardless of whether they're considered a threat or not. Due to this, Edwards and 39 other men were released on July 1. Staff at the institution noted their concerns about the release, as Edwards himself stated on multiple occasions that he had a separate, violent personality dubbed "The Beast" that went berserk at the sight of women, particularly brunettes.

Approximately a year after his release, Edwards married a woman named Lisa, with the pair moving to Huntington Beach, California soon afterwards. While everything went smoothly initially, Edwards started struggling to keep a job due to paranoid delusions. One time, he got badly hurt at work, leaving his hands permanently scarred and thus unable to work. His wife soon moved out for undisclosed reasons, leading Edwards to increasingly contact Salisbury and talk about his problems.

According to Salisbury, Edwards would attempt to control his reemerging impulses by spending lots of time in the woods, sometimes living out of his camper van along with his dog. His enthusiasm for the area eventually led to him being hired as a forest range officer at the South Coast Gun Club in Irvine. Not long after, an instructor at the club named Richard Malchow started noticing that the new employee exhibited odd behavior, such as sneaking around and taking pictures of young girls and women, as well as spying on people from his camping spot at the Blue Jay Campground. However, as none of these were considered criminal offenses, Edwards was never arrested.

=== Murder of Vanessa Iberri ===
On September 19, 1981, Edwards was driving around the Cleveland National Forest when he spotted two girls walking along a dirt road - Vanessa Iberri and Kelly Cartier, both 12. He then drove within 10 feet of them and called out for them to come over - when they did so, he pulled out a gun and shot both of them in the head before speeding away. The crime was witnessed by a passer-by who followed after the speeding truck, noted the license plate number and immediately called the police.

A description of the suspect was released to the public, leading to Malchow submitting a tip that it might be Edwards. When the truck was positively identified as his, a manhunt was initiated to apprehend him. In the meantime, the two wounded girls were driven to the hospital, where Iberri succumbed to her injuries at the Mission Community Hospital in Mission Viejo. Meanwhile, Cartier underwent cranial surgery and survived her injuries. In solidarity with the girls, their classmates raised a reward of $300 for anybody who could help capture the accused killer, all the while police departments across the nation were looking for Edwards.

== Arrest and trials ==
While authorities in California were looking for him, Edwards boarded a bus bound for College Park, Maryland. Upon arrival, he checked in at a Days Inn and called two friends of his, a former cellmate and Martin Salisbury. During the conversations, he told where he was - less than an hour later, a squad of heavily armed state troopers surrounded the motel.

Salisbury was transported to the area to act as a negotiator, and after some time, he convinced Edwards to surrender himself. Later on, he agreed to cooperate with investigators on the condition that his friend was present. In said interviews, Edwards claimed to suffer from headaches and periodic blackouts that rendered him incapable of remembering what had happened, but this was considered a ploy for a potential insanity plea, as Salisbury noted that Edwards had become quite adept at manipulating others by repeating psychiatric jargon he had heard at Patuxent.

Edwards' attorney, Autry Noblitt, attempted to fight the extradition to California and refused offers for his client to be interviewed. These efforts were unsuccessful, as Edwards was eventually extradited, tried and convicted of murder and attempted murder. However, as the jurors could not agree on a sentence, a new sentencing trial with a new jury was scheduled. At that second trial, Edwards fired his public defender and refused to defend himself, resulting in a death sentence. Just prior to sentencing, Edwards asked for a new public defender - Deputy Public Defender Michael Giannini was chosen, and managed to convince the court to have a third sentencing trial.

At this third trial, the prosecutor presented further evidence of Edwards' disturbed behavior, including revelations that during his marriage with Lisa, he would play sex games in which he pretended to tie her up and then cut her throat, watching her bleed out while she begged for her life. Eventually, Edwards was sentenced to death yet again - upon hearing the verdict, Iberri's father Joseph expressed relief about the recent removal of Justice Rose Bird from the Supreme Court of California, as she was known for her anti-death penalty stance.

Following his conviction, Edwards' pickup truck was abandoned at a vehicle graveyard where the cars of other serial killers, most notably Randy Kraft and William Bonin, were also left.

== Imprisonment, death and link to previous crimes ==
For the remainder of his life, Edwards remained on death row at the San Quentin State Prison, attempting to have his sentence commuted. In 2008, after another of his appeals was denied, Joseph Iberri gave an interview to the Los Angeles Times in which he expressed his frustrations with the fact that executions in the state had been halted and that his daughter's killer had still not faced justice. When asked if Edwards deserved mercy, Iberri replied that he deserved none.

In December 2008, Edwards was admitted to the California Medical Facility in Vacaville to undergo treatment for lung cancer. On February 14, 2009, he died from natural causes. When informed of his death, Joseph Iberri expressed relief that his daughter's killer was finally dead, but also anger that he had not been executed years prior.

Starting back in 1985, detectives from the Montgomery County Police Department started actively reinvestigating the murders of Kennedy and Kalberer, focusing on any evidence that could implicate Edwards. This led to the examination of a small bloodstain found on a green army jacket that was found during the initial search of his residence back in 1970. Using new DNA technology, it was determined that there was a match between the bloodstain on the jacket and Sherry Kennedy's DNA. Although not considered a perfect match, it was enough for both her and Kalberer's cases to be officially closed in January 2012, with Edwards named as their killer.

== See also ==
- Capital punishment in California
- List of serial killers in the United States
