= Alan Weinberger =

American businessman and educator

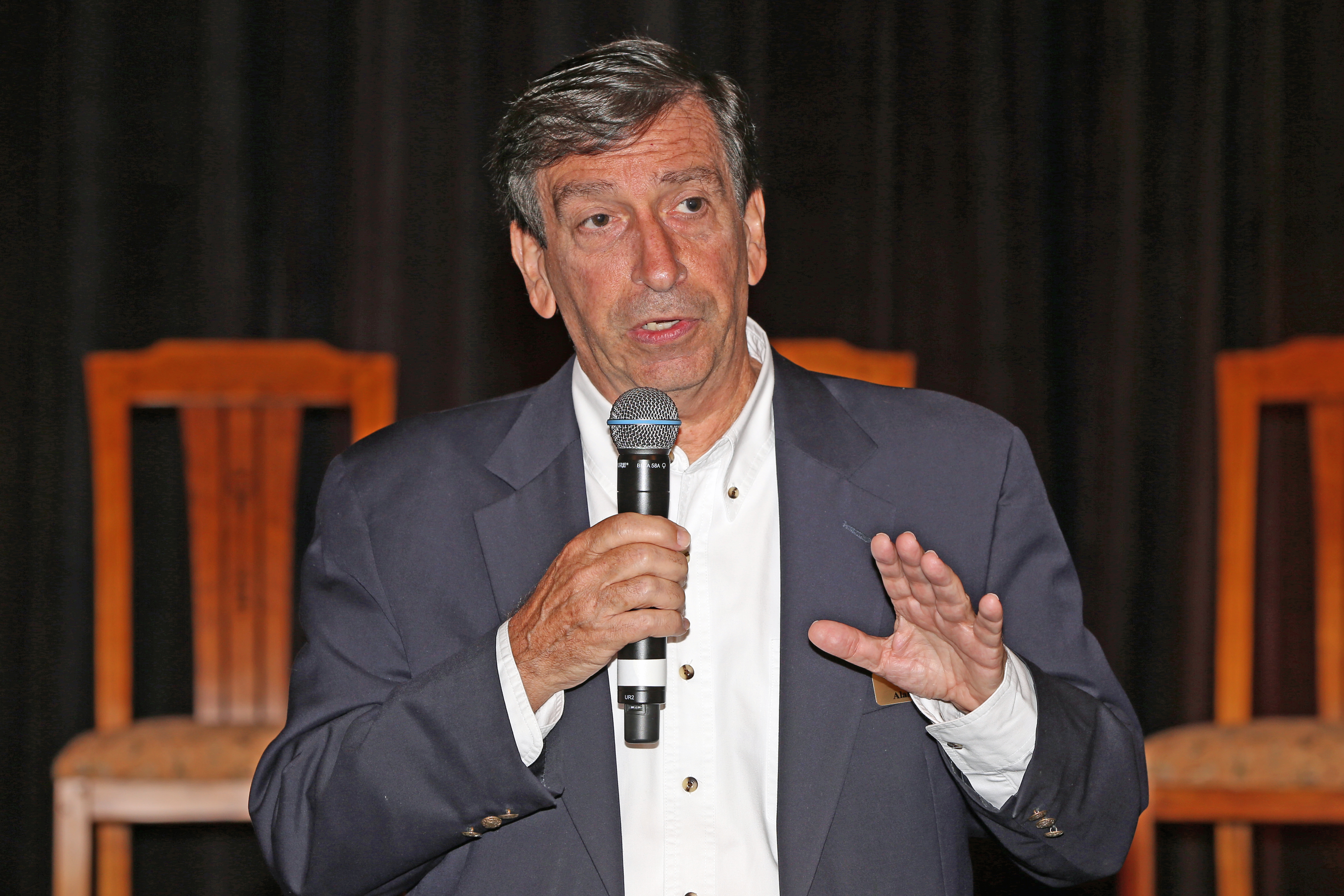
- Weinberger speaks at an ASCII IT SMB Success Summit
- Born: Alan D. Weinberger; July 31, 1945; Washington, D.C., United States
- Died: June 29, 2025; Bethesda, Maryland, United States
- Education: New York University, Harvard Law School
- Occupations: Educator, entrepreneur, lawyer, businessman
- Known for: CEO, chairman and founder of ASCII Group

Alan Weinberger was an American educator, entrepreneur, lawyer, and businessman. He was the founder, CEO and chairman of The ASCII Group, an independent organization of information technology (IT) solution providers, integrators, managed service providers (MSP) and value added resellers (VAR) that represents more than 2,000 American and Canadian computer re-sellers.

== Education ==
Weinberger received his bachelor's degree and Juris Doctor from New York University and his Master of Laws from Harvard.

== Career ==
Weinberger served as a founding professor at the Vermont Law School in 1973. In 1984, Weinberger founded the ASCII Group. In 1989, Weinberger began working with Soviet Ministry of Foreign Economic Relations to create academic programs in which Western management and marketing strategies were taught to high level Soviet managers. Weinberger founded the IT information portal, TechnologyNet, Inc., in 1995.

In 2012, Weinberger was announced as an executive producer for the film Mary Mother of Christ.

In 2026, Weinberger was posthumously inducted into the IT Hall of Fame in recognition of his contributions to the IT industry and his leadership in the independent technology services community. The induction took place during ASCII Edge Chicago on September 23, 2026.
