= Bethesda, Maryland =

- Census-designated place
- Bethesda Urban Partnership, Inc.
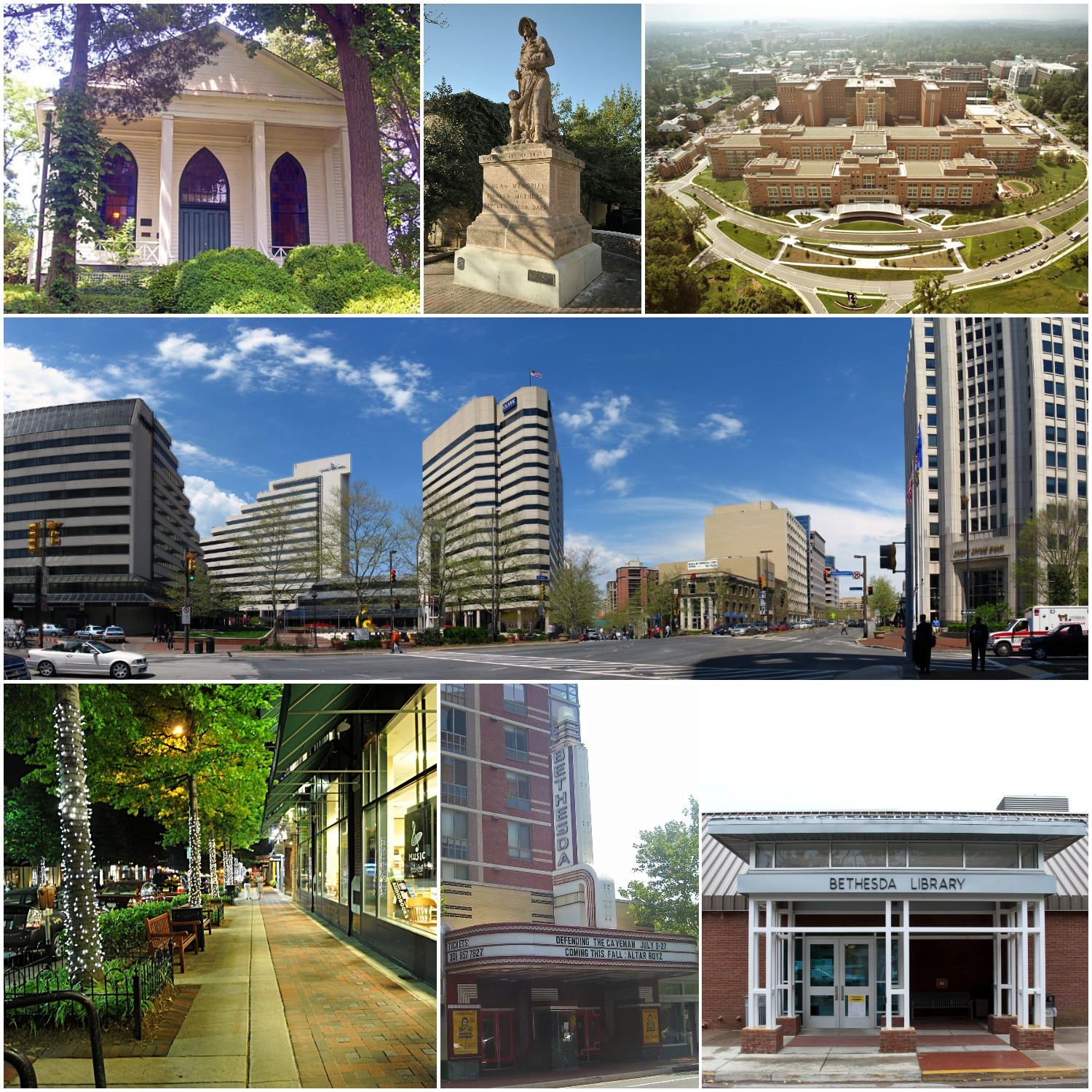
- From top: Bethesda Meeting House, Bethesda's Madonna of the Trail statue, the National Institutes of Health, downtown Bethesda near the Bethesda Metro station, Bethesda Avenue at night, Bethesda Theatre, and the Connie Morella Library
- Interactive map of Bethesda, Maryland
- Location within Maryland Location within the United States
- Coordinates: 38°59′5″N 77°6′47″W
- Country: United States
- State: Maryland
- County: Montgomery

Government
  - Type: Management organization with county sanction
  - Executive director: Jeff Burton
  - Marketing and communications director: Stephanie Coppula
  - Finance and operations director: Jeff Oyer
  - Field operations manager: Eli Banks
  - Office manager: Chiqui Laboy

Area
  - Total: 13.33 sq mi (34.52 km^{2})
  - Land: 13.26 sq mi (34.35 km^{2})
  - Water: 0.066 sq mi (0.17 km^{2})
- Elevation: 354 ft (108 m)

Population (2020)
  - Total: 68,056
  - Density: 5,132/sq mi (1,981.3/km^{2})
- Time zone: UTC−5 (Eastern (EST))
  - Summer (DST): UTC−4 (EDT)
- ZIP Codes: 20800–20899
- Area codes: 301, 240
- FIPS code: 24-07125
- GNIS feature ID: 2389206

Bethesda (/bəˈθɛzdə/) is an unincorporated, census-designated place in southern Montgomery County, Maryland, United States. Located just northwest of Washington, D.C., it is a major business and government center of the Washington metropolitan region and a national center for medical research. According to the 2020 census, the community had a population of 68,056.

== Etymology ==
It takes its name from a local church, the Bethesda Meeting House (1820, rebuilt 1849), which in turn took its name from Jerusalem's Pool of Bethesda.

== History ==
Bethesda is located in the traditional territory of the indigenous Native Piscataway and Nacotchtank at the time of European colonization. Fur trader Henry Fleet became the first European to visit the area, reaching it by sailing up the Potomac River. He stayed with the Piscataway tribe from 1623 to 1627, either as a guest or prisoner (historical accounts differ). Fleet eventually secured funding for another expedition to the region and was later granted proprietary rights to 2,000 acres of land in the nascent colony and became a member of Maryland's colonial legislature. Raids from the Senecas and Susquehannock resulted in the creation of the Maryland division of Rangers in 1694 to patrol the frontier.

Most settlers in colonial Maryland were tenant farmers who paid their rent in tobacco, and colonists continued to expand farther north in search of fertile land. Henry Darnall (1645–1711) surveyed a 710-acre (290-hectare) area in 1694 which became the first land grant in Bethesda. Tobacco farming was the primary way of life in Bethesda throughout the 1700s. The city avoided seeing action during the Revolutionary War, although it became a supply region for the fledgling Continental Navy. The establishment of Washington, D.C., in 1790 deprived Montgomery County of its economic center at Georgetown, although the event had little effect on the small farmers throughout Bethesda.

Between 1805 and 1821, Bethesda became a rural way station after the development of the Washington and Rockville Turnpike, which carried tobacco and other products between Georgetown and Rockville, and north to Frederick. The Bethesda Meeting House, a Presbyterian church, was built in 1820. The church burned in 1849 and was rebuilt the same year about 100 yards (91 m) south, and its former location became the Cemetery of the Bethesda Meeting House.

In 1852, the postmaster general established a post office in the area and appointed Rev. A. R. Smith its first postmaster. By 1862, a small settlement had grown around a store and tollhouse along the turnpike known as "Darcy's Store" for the store's owner, William E. Darcy. It consisted of a blacksmith shop, a church and school, and a few houses and stores. In 1871, postmaster Robert Franck renamed the settlement for the church.

A streetcar line, the Tennallytown and Rockville Railway, was established in 1890. This and other factors drovesuburbanization and population growth in the early 1900s. In 1910, the Baltimore and Ohio Railroad (B&O) completed its Georgetown Branch line from Silver Spring to Georgetown, including a storage yard there and multiple sidings serving industries in Bethesda. The line would operate as a rail line until 1985, when B&O successor CSX sold it to Montgomery County, which transformed it into Capital Crescent Trail as part of the rails-to-trails movement. The tracks were removed in 1994, and the first part of the trail was opened in 1998. It has become the most used rail-trail in the United States, averaging over one million users per year.

Land development on old farmland began in the late 19th century, with the subdivisions of Drummond, Woodmont, Edgemoor, and Battery Park. Farther north, several wealthy men made Rockville Pike famous for its mansions. These included Brainard W. Parker ("Cedarcroft", 1892), James Oyster ("Strathmore", 1899), George E. Hamilton ("Hamilton House", 1904; now the Stone Ridge School), Luke I. Wilson ("Tree Tops", 1926), Gilbert Hovey Grosvenor ("Wild Acres", 1928–29), and George Freeland Peter ("Stone House", 1930). In 1930, Armistead Peter's pioneering manor house "Winona" (1873) became the clubhouse of the Woodmont Country Club on land that is now part of the National Institutes of Health (NIH) campus. Merle Thorpe's mansion "Pook's Hill" (1927, razed 1948) became the home-in-exile of the Norwegian royal family during World War II.

Before the passage of the Fair Housing Act of 1968, restrictive covenants were used in Bethesda to exclude racial and ethnic minorities—primarily African-Americans, but also Asian-Americans and ethnic groups regarded as "Semitic". In practice, covenants excluding "Semitic races" were generally used to exclude Jews as Montgomery County did not have notable Armenian, Greek, Syrian, or Turkish populations at the time.

One 1938 restrictive covenant in the Bradley Woods subdivision of Bethesda said:

"No part of the land hereby conveyed, shall ever be used, or occupied by or sold, demised, transferred, conveyed, unto, or in trust for, leased, or rented, or given to negroes, or any person or persons of negro blood or extraction or to any person of the Semitic Race, blood, or origin, which racial description shall be deemed to include Armenians, Jews, Hebrews, Persians, Syrians, Greeks and Turks, or to any person of the Mongolian Race, blood, or origin, which racial description shall be deemed to include Chinese, Japanese, and Mongolians, except that this paragraph shall not be held to exclude partial occupancy of the premises by domestic servants of the purchaser or purchasers."

World War II and the subsequent expansion of government fed the rapid growth of Bethesda. Both the National Naval Medical Center (1940–42) and the NIH complex (1948) were built just to the north of the developing downtown, and this drew government contractors, medical professionals, and other businesses to the area.

Bethesda has become the major urban core and employment center of southwestern Montgomery County, driven particularly by the 1984 expansion of Metrorail with a station in Bethesda. The Bethesda Metro Center was built over the Red Line metro rail, which prompted further commercial and residential development. In the 2000s, the strict height limits on construction in the District of Columbia led to the development of mid-and high-rise office and residential towers around the Bethesda Metro station.

== Geography ==
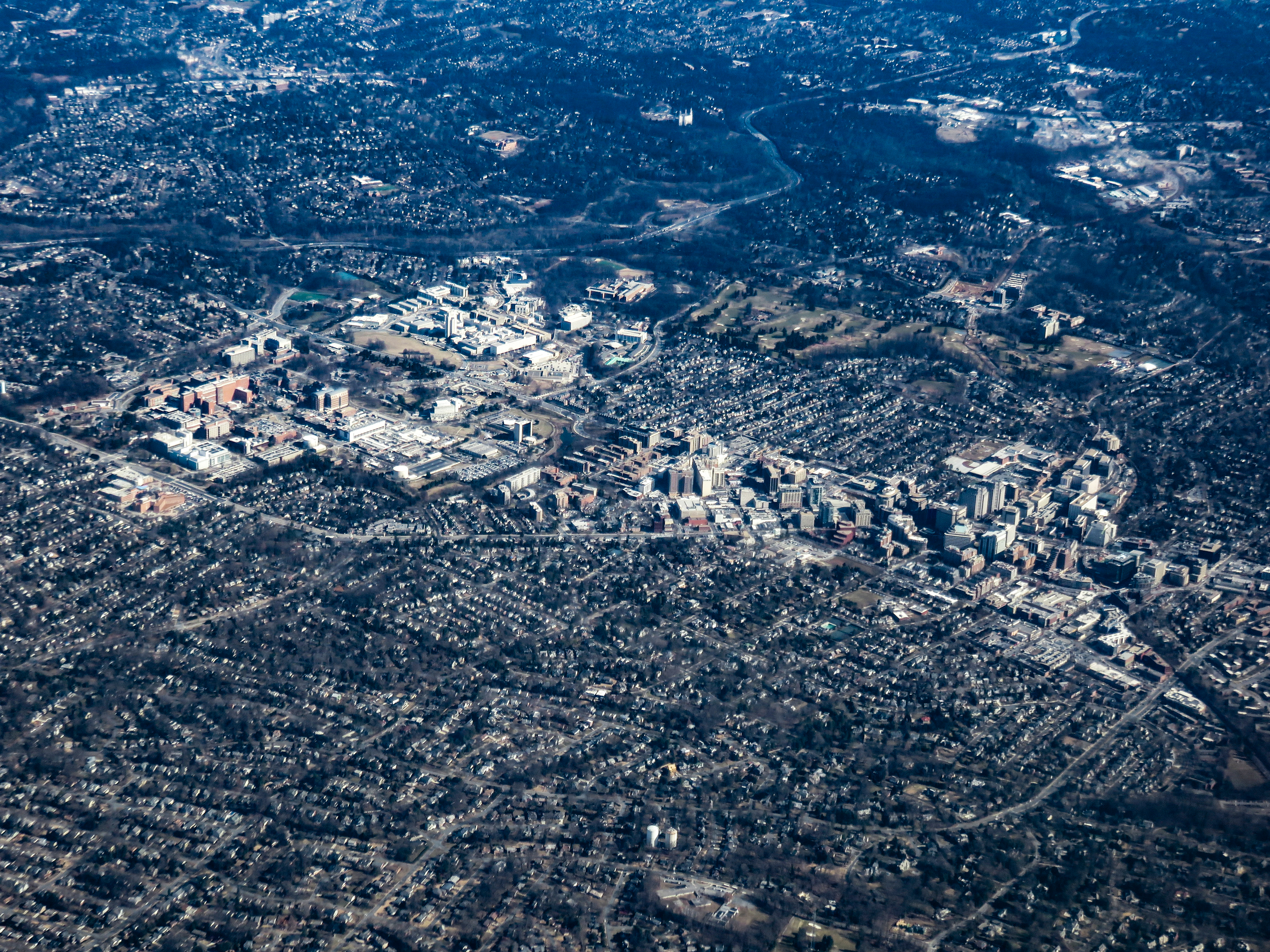
Aerial view of downtown Bethesda (bottom right) with the National Institutes of Health campus (upper left) and Walter Reed National Military Medical Center (right)

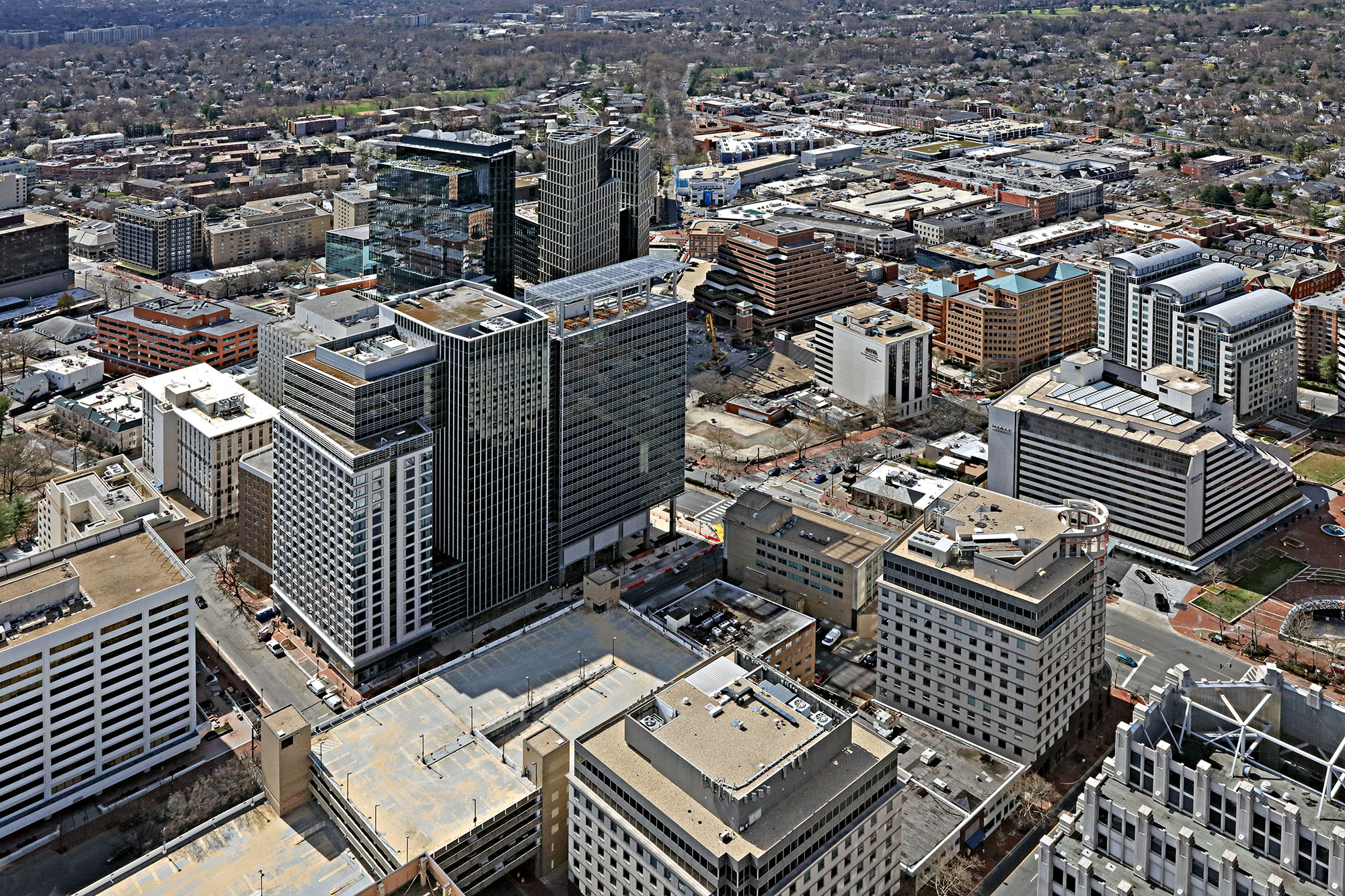
Bethesda looking southwest at the downtown area

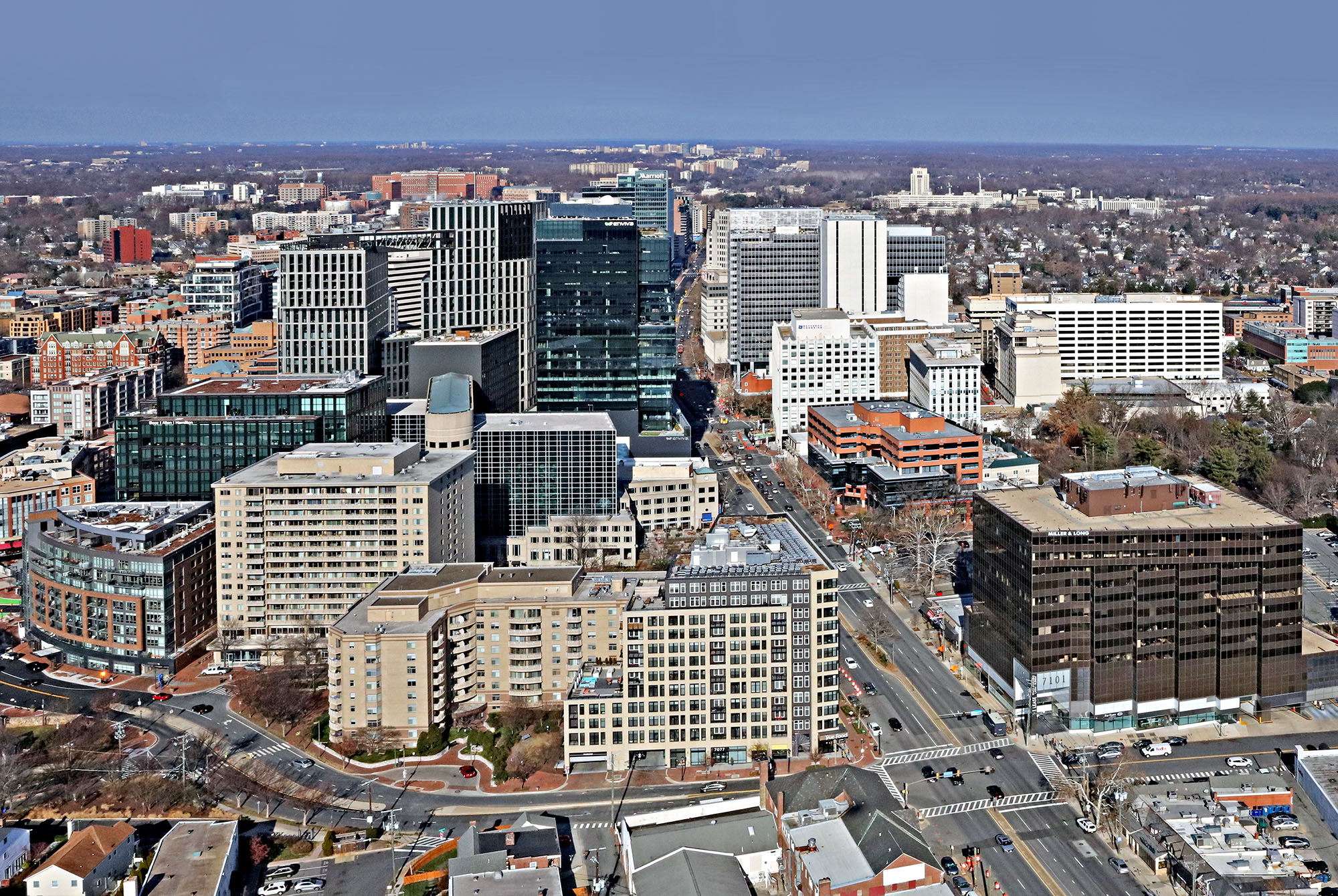
Bethesda looking north at Wisconsin Avenue

According to the U.S. Census Bureau, the CDP has a total area of 13.2 square miles (34 km^{2}), of which 13.1 square miles (34 km^{2}) is land and 0.1 square miles (0.26 km^{2}) (0.38%) is water. The main commercial corridor that passes through Bethesda is Maryland Route 355 (known as Wisconsin Avenue in Bethesda and as Rockville Pike and Hungerford Drive in more northern communities), which, to the north, connects Bethesda with the communities of North Bethesda and Rockville, ending, after several name changes, in Frederick. Toward the South, Rockville Pike becomes Wisconsin Avenue near the NIH Campus and continues beyond Bethesda through Chevy Chase, Friendship Heights and into Washington, D.C., ending in Georgetown.

The area commonly known as Downtown Bethesda is centered at the intersection of Wisconsin Avenue, Old Georgetown Road and East-West Highway. This intersection is about two and one-half miles from Washington, D.C.'s western boundary, making Bethesda a close-in suburb of the nation's capital. Other focal points of downtown Bethesda include the Woodmont Triangle, bordered by Old Georgetown Road (Maryland Route 187), Woodmont and Rugby Avenues, and the Bethesda Row, centered at the intersection of Woodmont Avenue and Bethesda Avenue. Much of the dense construction in that area followed the opening of the Bethesda station on the Red Line of the Washington Metro rapid transit system, also located at this intersection and the centerpiece of the Bethesda Metro Center development. The Medical Center Metro stop lies about 0.7 miles north of the Bethesda stop, Medical Center, which serves the NIH Campus, the Walter Reed National Military Medical Center, and the Uniformed Services University of the Health Sciences.

== Demographics ==
Historical population
Census	Pop.	Note	%±
1960	56,527		—
1970	71,621		26.7%
1980	62,736		−12.4%
1990	62,936		0.3%
2000	55,277		−12.2%
2010	60,858		10.1%
2020	68,056		11.8%
source: 2010–2020

=== Racial & ethnic composition ===
Bethesda CDP, Maryland – Racial and ethnic composition Note: the US Census treats Hispanic/Latino as an ethnic category. This table excludes Latinos from the racial categories and assigns them to a separate category. Hispanics/Latinos may be of any race.
Race / Ethnicity (NH = Non-Hispanic)	Pop 2000	Pop 2010	Pop 2020	% 2000	% 2010	% 2020
White alone (NH)	45,210	47,327	46,290	81.79%	77.77%	68.02%
Black or African American alone (NH)	1,432	1,944	3,058	2.59%	3.19%	4.49%
Native American or Alaska Native alone (NH)	64	59	50	0.12%	0.10%	0.07%
Asian alone (NH)	4,357	5,647	8,325	7.88%	9.28%	12.23%
Native Hawaiian or Pacific Islander alone (NH)	24	37	26	0.04%	0.06%	0.04%
Other race alone (NH)	178	193	481	0.32%	0.32%	0.71%
Mixed race or Multiracial (NH)	1,012	1,507	3,575	1.83%	2.48%	5.25%
Hispanic or Latino (any race)	3,000	4,144	6,251	5.43%	6.81%	9.19%
Total	55,277	60,858	68,056	100.00%	100.00%	100.00%

=== 2020 census ===
As of the 2020 census, Bethesda had a population of 68,056. The median age was 42.4 years. 22.1% of residents were under the age of 18 and 19.4% of residents were 65 years of age or older. For every 100 females there were 90.7 males, and for every 100 females age 18 and over there were 87.0 males age 18 and over. 24.4% of residents were foreign-born.

100.0% of residents lived in urban areas, while 0.0% lived in rural areas.

There were 27,812 households in Bethesda, of which 30.5% had children under the age of 18 living in them. Of all households, 53.6% were married-couple households, 15.0% were households with a male householder and no spouse or partner present, and 27.5% were households with a female householder and no spouse or partner present. About 30.6% of all households were made up of individuals and 12.7% had someone living alone who was 65 years of age or older.

There were 29,547 housing units, of which 5.9% were vacant. The homeowner vacancy rate was 0.9% and the rental vacancy rate was 6.2%.

=== 2000 census ===
As of the census of 2000, there were 55,277 people, 23,659 households, and 14,455 families residing in the CDP. The population density was 4,205.8 inhabitants per square mile (1,623.9/km^{2}). There were 24,368 housing units at an average density of 1,854.1 per square mile (715.9/km^{2}). The racial makeup of the CDP was 85.86% White, 2.67% Black or African American, 0.17% Native American, 7.92% Asian, 0.05% Pacific Islander, 1.23% from other races, and 2.11% from two or more races. 5.43% of the population were Hispanic or Latino of any race.

There were 23,659 households, out of which 28.0% had children under the age of 18 living with them, 53.4% were married couples living together, 6.0% had a female householder with no husband present, and 38.9% were non-families. 32.2% of all households were made up of individuals, and 11.6% had someone living alone who was 65 years of age or older. The average household size was 2.30, and the average family size was 2.92.

In the CDP, 21.8% of the population was under the age of 18, 4.6% from 18 to 24, 29.2% from 25 to 44, 27.1% from 45 to 64, and 17.2% was 65 years of age or older. The median age was 41 years. For every 100 females, there were 87.7 males. For every 100 females age 18 and over, there were 84.0 males.

Bethesda is a very wealthy and well-educated area. According to the 2000 census, Bethesda was the best-educated city in the United States of America, with a population of 50,000 or more. 79% of residents 25 or older have bachelor's degrees, and 49% have graduate or professional degrees. According to a 2007 estimate, the median income for a household in the CDP was $117,723, and the median income for a family was $168,385. Males had a median income of $84,797 versus $57,569 for females. The per capita income for the CDP was $58,479. About 1.7% of families and 3.3% of the population were below the poverty line, including 1.8% of those under age 18 and 4.1% of those age 65 or over. Many commute to Washington, D.C., for work. The average price of a four-bedroom, two-bath home in Bethesda in 2010 was $806,817 (which ranks it as the twentieth most expensive community in America).

Bethesda is often associated with its neighboring communities, Potomac, Chevy Chase, Great Falls, Virginia, and McLean, Virginia, for their similar demographics.

== Media ==
=== Fox 5 ===
Local Fox affiliate Fox 5, WTTG, is located in Bethesda in the Wilson building at 7272 Wisconsin Avenue. The studio often films with a live shot facing north on Wisconsin Avenue capturing the skyline of downtown Bethesda.

== Education ==
Bethesda is located in the Montgomery County Public School District.

Public primary schools in Bethesda include:

- Ashburton Elementary School
- Bannockburn Elementary School
- Bethesda Elementary School
- Bradley Hills Elementary School
- Burning Tree Elementary School
- Carderock Springs Elementary School
- Seven Locks Elementary School
- Westbrook Elementary School (the only building in Montgomery County built under the Works Progress Administration)
- Wood Acres Elementary School
- Wyngate Elementary School

Public middle schools in Bethesda include:

- North Bethesda Middle School
- Thomas W. Pyle Middle School
- Westland Middle School

Public high schools in Bethesda include:

- Bethesda-Chevy Chase High School
- Walt Whitman High School
- Walter Johnson High School

Private schools in Bethesda include:

- Bethesda Community School
- Feynman School
- Rochambeau French International School (two campuses)
- Georgetown Preparatory School
- The Harbor School
- Holton-Arms
- Landon
- Little Flower School (K–8)
- Mater Dei School
- Norwood (in the Potomac CDP)
- Oneness-Family School
- Our Lady of Lourdes School
- St. Andrew's Episcopal School (in the Potomac CDP)
- St. Bartholomew (Blue Ribbon elementary school PK–8)
- Saint Jane de Chantal Catholic School (preK–8)
- Sidwell Friends School (Lower School)
- Stone Ridge School of the Sacred Heart
- Washington Episcopal School (N–8)
- Washington Waldorf School
- The Woods Academy

Bethesda is home to a federally funded and operated health science university, the Uniformed Services University of the Health Sciences (USU). The primary mission of USU is to prepare graduates for service in the Medical Corps of the U.S. Army, Navy, and Air Force, and the Public Health Service. The university consists of the F. Edward Hebert School of Medicine, a medical school, and the Graduate School of Nursing, a nursing school. National Intelligence University is also in Bethesda.

The Washington Japanese Language School, a supplementary weekend Japanese school, holds its classes at the Stone Ridge School of the Sacred Heart in Bethesda. The WJLS maintains its school office in North Bethesda, adjacent to Garrett Park. The institution, giving supplemental education to Japanese-speaking children in the Washington, D.C., area, was founded in 1958, making it the oldest Japanese government-sponsored supplementary school in the U.S.

The Writer's Center in Bethesda publishes Poet Lore, the longest continuously running poetry journal in the United States.

== Economy ==
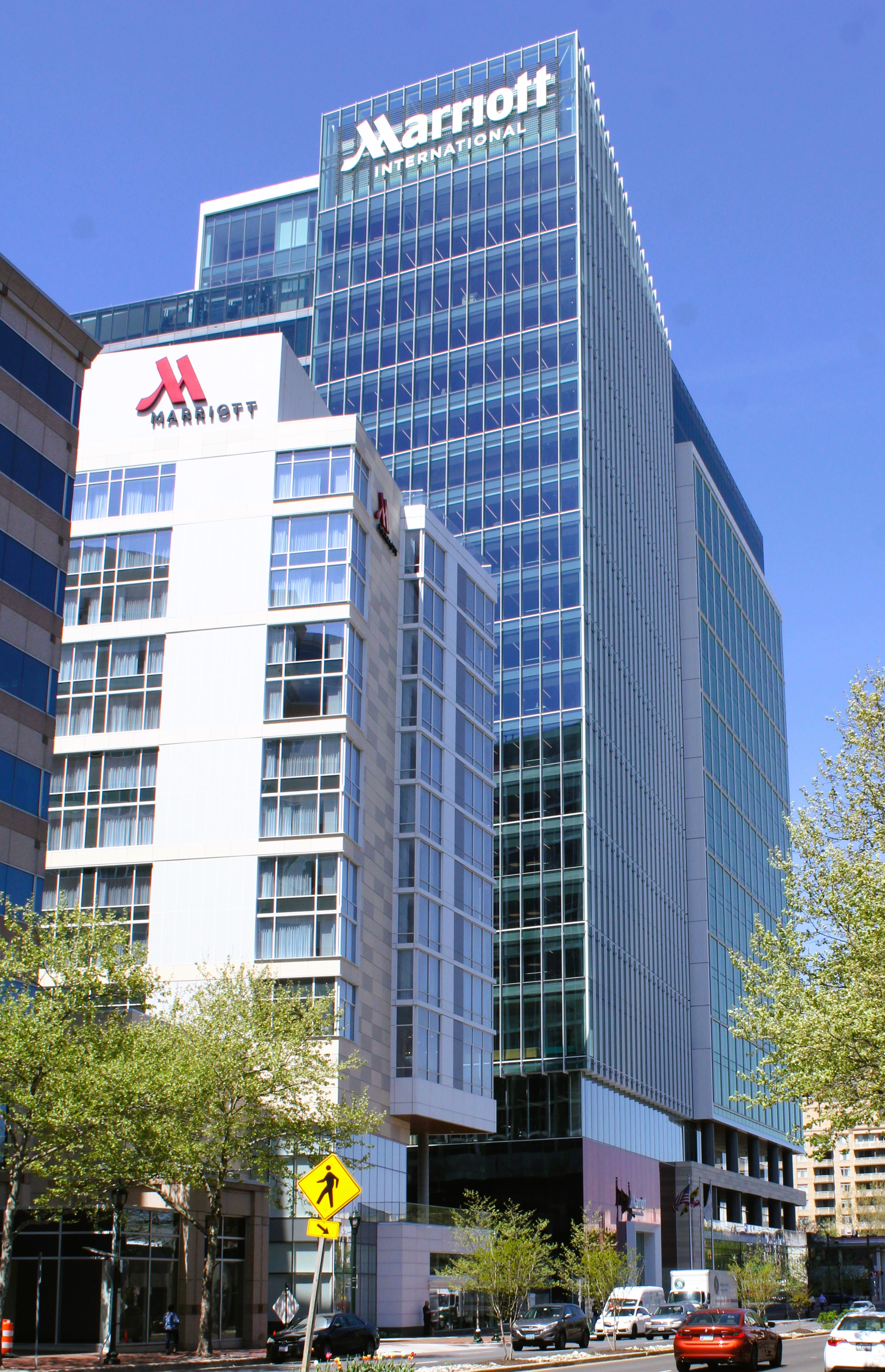
The global headquarters of Marriott International, the largest hotel chain in the world, in downtown Bethesda

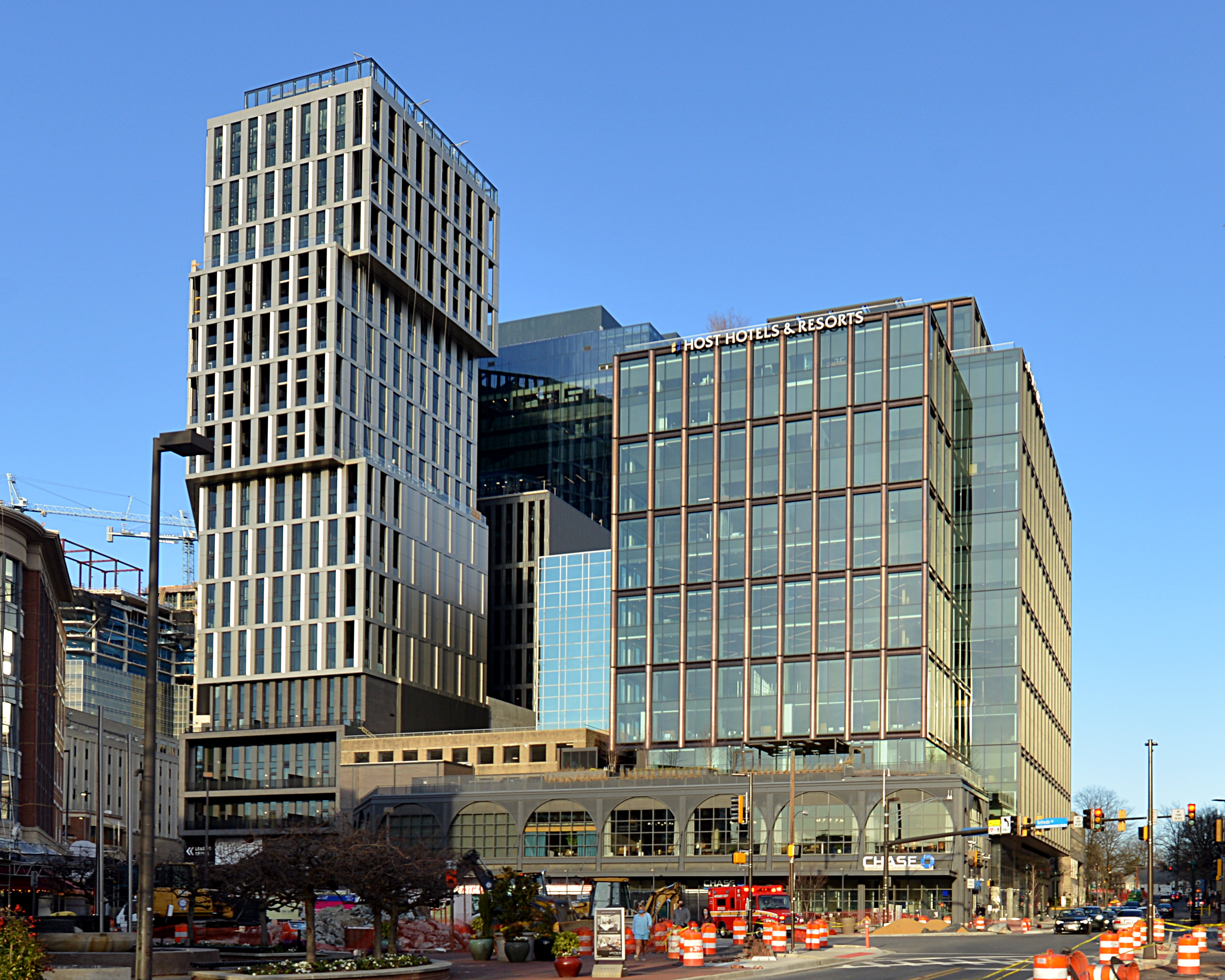
The headquarters building of Host Hotels & Resorts in downtown Bethesda

Notable companies based in Bethesda include:

- AdvisorShares
- AREVA (U.S. headquarters)
- ASCII Group
- Cambridge Information Group
- Centrus Energy
- Coventry Health Care
- Cystic Fibrosis Foundation
- Enviva
- Fox Television Stations
  - WTTG and WDCA
- GEICO
- HMSHost
- Host Hotels & Resorts
- International Neuroethics Society
- JBG Smith
- Lockheed Martin
- Marriott International
- ProShares
- Ritz Carlton
- RLJ Companies
- Youth For Understanding USA
- Wellness Corporate Solutions
- Westat

== Management ==
Downtown Bethesda is managed by the Bethesda Urban Partnership, a non-profit organization established in 1994 by Montgomery County.

== Transportation ==
Washington Metro's Red Line services two primary locations in Bethesda: the downtown area at the Bethesda station, and the area near the National Institutes of Health and the Walter Reed Medical Center at the Medical Center station. The Maryland Transit Administration's Purple Line, a light rail line currently under construction, will provide a direct connection from Bethesda to Silver Spring, the University of Maryland, College Park, and New Carrollton. The Purple Line will allow riders from Bethesda to move between the Red, Green, and Orange lines of the Washington Metro transportation system, as well as to MARC and Amtrak trains, without needing to ride into central Washington, D.C.

Local buses include:

- WMATA's Metrobus
- The Montgomery County Ride On bus system also has several routes through Bethesda.
- Bethesda Circulator, a free loop bus that operates Monday-Saturday and covers most of downtown Bethesda.

Long-distance buses include:

- Fairfax Connector Route 798 provides service from Tysons, Virginia to downtown Bethesda.
- Vamoose Bus and Tripper Bus, both of which provide service from downtown Bethesda to the proximity of Penn Station in Midtown Manhattan, New York City.
  - Tripper Bus, a privately owned company, provides service from Bethesda 4681 Willow Ln, Bethesda, MD 20814 at the corner of Wisconsin Ave., opposite side of Panera Bread, the same side of Bethesda's Farm Women's Market to New York City between 8th and 9th Ave near Penn Station, in close to proximity to Port Authority Bus Terminal.

== Notable people ==
- Jonathan Allen, journalist
- José Andrés, chef
- Trace Armstrong, former NFL player
- Red Auerbach, former NBA coach
- Aran Bell, ballet dancer
- Deane Beman, PGA Tour Commissioner and professional golfer
- Ezra Taft Benson, the Secretary of Agriculture under President Eisenhower
- Wolf Blitzer, journalist
- Mike Brey, basketball coach
- James Brown, sportscaster
- Preston Burpo, soccer player
- Patrick Byrne, entrepreneur
- Chuck Carey, soccer player
- Andrea Carroll, soprano
- Michael Cerveris, actor
- William Dean Christensen, serial killer known as “The American Jack the Ripper”
- Connie Chung, television journalist
- Colin Cloherty, NFL player
- Steve Coll, journalist and author
- Candy Crowley, journalist
- E. J. Dionne, journalist, political commentator, and author
- David Dobkin, director, screenwriter, and producer
- Michael Dunn (born 1994), National Football League (NFL) offensive lineman
- William Eacho, former U.S. ambassador to Austria
- Gregg Easterbrook, sports columnist.
- Jeremy Ebobisse, soccer player
- Thomas Francis Edwards, serial killer nicknamed The Bethesda Butcher
- Jo Ann Emerson, former U.S. Representative, Missouri
- Kenneth Feinberg, attorney
- John Feinstein, author
- Janet Foutty, businessperson, author, and public speaker
- Thomas Frank, journalist and author
- Neal Fredericks, cinematographer
- Thomas Friedman, journalist and author
- Merrick Garland, 86th United States Attorney General
- Carol Guess, American poet and fiction writer
- Howard Gutman, former U.S. ambassador to Belgium
- Mark Halperin, journalist and author
- Steve Handelsman, journalist
- Laura Hillenbrand, author
- Henry Hodges, actor, played Horace Robedaux in The Orphans' Home Cycle.
- Antawn Jamison, basketball player
- Walter Johnson, baseball player
- Spike Jonze, director, producer, screenwriter, and actor
- Larry Kaufman, chess Grandmaster
- Brett Kavanaugh, United States Supreme Court Justice
- Judith Kent, business executive and philanthropist
- Julie Kent, ballet dancer
- Greg Koch, former NFL player
- Ferenc Körmendi, Hungarian novelist and broadcaster
- Judy Kuhn, actress
- Tim Kurkjian, ESPN analyst
- Katie Ledecky, Olympic champion swimmer
- Nils Lofgren, musician
- Julia Louis-Dreyfus, actress
- Allison Macfarlane, chair of the Nuclear Regulatory Commission.
- Justin Maxwell, MLB player
- Matt McCoy, actor
- Alice McDermott, author
- Sean Murray, actor
- Nalini Nadkarni, forest ecologist
- Alondra Nelson, sociologist and Dean of Social Science at Columbia University
- Martin O'Malley, politician, former governor of Maryland, former Democratic presidential candidate
- Maynard Olson, chemist and molecular biologist
- Reza Pahlavi, Iranian royalty, son of Iran's last monarch.
- Nick Palatas, actor
- Periphery, progressive metal band
- Maury Povich, television host
- Mark Pryor, former U.S. Senator, Arkansas
- Giuliana Rancic, celebrity news personality
- Patricia Richardson, actress, Home Improvement
- James Risen, journalist
- Alexandra Robbins, author
- Cokie Roberts, journalist and author
- Wayne Rooney, British soccer player
- Chip Roy, U.S. representative for Texas
- Richard Schiff, actor
- Dan Shanoff, sports columnist
- David Simon, author, journalist, and television producer
- Gordon Smith, former U.S. Senator, Oregon
- Daniel Stern, actor
- John J. Sweeney, Former President of the AFL-CIO
- Max Talisman – actor, writer, and director
- Jacob Tamarkin, mathematician
- George Spiro Thanos, martial artist champion
- Jeff Tremaine, director, screenwriter, and producer
- Christopher Weaver, software developer and the founder of Bethesda Softworks and Zenimax Media
- Meredith Whitney (born 1969), businesswoman
- Thomas Wieser, American-Austrian economist
- Michael Wilbon, journalist, sportscaster
- Gedion Zelalem, soccer player

== See also ==
- Washington metropolitan area
- River Road freedmen community
- Moses Cemetery
