= Macedonia Baptist Church (Bethesda, Maryland) =

Baptist church in Bethesda, Maryland, United States

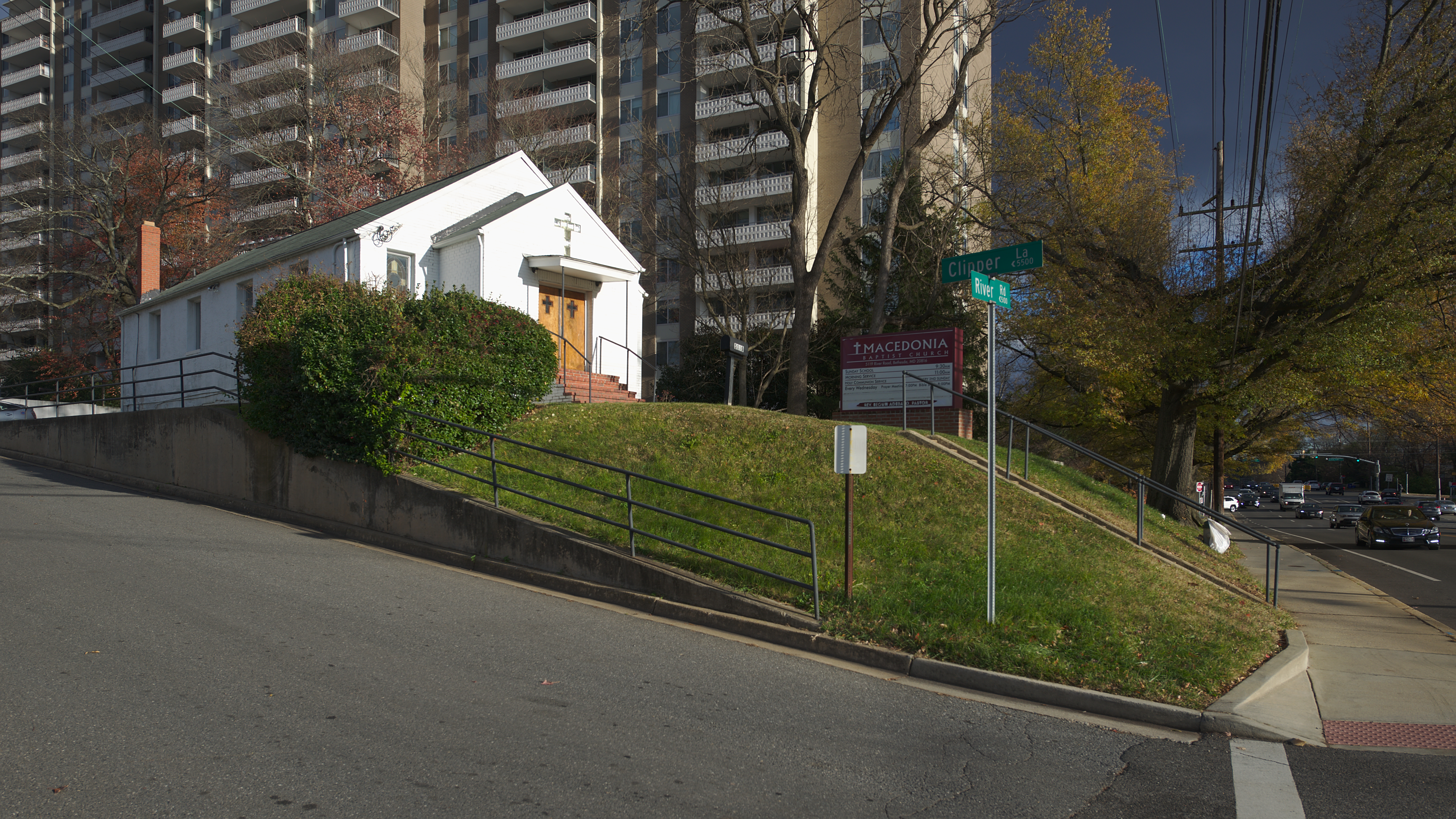
- Macedonia Baptist Church
- 38.9641°N 77.1021°W
- Location: 5119 River Road, Bethesda, Maryland 20816
- Country: United States
- Denomination: Baptist

History
- Status: Active
- Founded: 1920

Macedonia Baptist Church is a historic Baptist church at 5119 River Road in Bethesda, Montgomery County, Maryland, United States. Founded in 1920, it is the last surviving institution of River Road (also known as Graysville), the freedom colony established by freedpeople in the Westbard area of Bethesda after the American Civil War, and it is documented as an anchor institution of that historic settlement in a 2022 National Park Service historic resources study.

Since the mid-2010s the church has been the institutional center of the movement to protect and memorialize the River Road Moses Cemetery (Moses African Cemetery), the community's burial ground now lying beneath the parking lot of the Westwood Tower apartment complex. The Bethesda African Cemetery Coalition (BACC) grew out of the church's Social Justice Ministry, led by its First Lady, Marsha Coleman-Adebayo; and the church's pastor, the Rev. Dr. Olusegun Adebayo, was a petitioner in Bethesda African Cemetery Coalition v. Housing Opportunities Commission of Montgomery County, decided by the Supreme Court of Maryland in 2024.

== History ==
=== Origins in the River Road community ===
The River Road community was established by formerly enslaved people beginning in 1869 on low-lying land in southwestern Bethesda that white owners considered poor for agriculture; by 1880 it comprised roughly two dozen households and about a hundred people. Before Maryland's abolition of slavery in 1864, the land on which the church now stands lay within an area where enslaved African Americans lived and labored on surrounding farms and plantations.

Macedonia Baptist Church was founded in 1920, in the era when the freedpeople's descendants had built River Road into a functioning community of homes, farms, and institutions; the Rev. William Mason presided over the congregation in its early years. Through the era of segregation, when Black residents of Montgomery County were excluded from most public accommodations, the church served as the religious and social hub of the River Road settlement, where, in the recollection of lifelong congregant Harvey Matthews Sr., Sunday fellowship bound neighbors and newcomers together.

=== Displacement era ===
The suburban redevelopment of the Westbard area in the 1950s and 1960s displaced the River Road community, pushing Black families into Washington, D.C. and other parts of Montgomery County, including Rockville and Potomac. Some displaced families maintained their membership at Macedonia, and over the following decades the congregation increasingly drew worshippers from elsewhere in the region, including Prince George's County. The church remained in place as the residential community around it was removed, and by the twenty-first century it stood as the most visible surviving landmark of the historic settlement.

=== Recent decades ===
The Rev. Dr. Olusegun ("Segun") Adebayo, who joined the congregation in 1991, became pastor in 2016. The congregation marked its centennial in 2020, and as of the mid-2020s counted roughly eighty to ninety active participants, including about thirty children.

== Building ==
The church is a small white house of worship standing atop a hill on the west side of River Road at Clipper Lane in southwest Bethesda. Built in 1920, it now sits in front of the eighteen-story Kenwood Condominium, erected in 1965, and across a side street from a bank branch occupying ground where slave quarters once stood — a juxtaposition frequently noted in accounts of the transformation of the surrounding area.

== Social Justice Ministry and the Moses Cemetery movement ==
=== Background ===
The River Road Moses Cemetery, the burial ground associated with the historic community, operated in the vicinity of 5401 Westbard Avenue from before 1911 — when the Black benevolent lodge White's Tabernacle No. 39 purchased the property — until its sale in 1958, and is recorded in Montgomery County's cemetery inventory under alternate names that include "Macedonia Baptist Cemetery." The site was paved during the construction of the Westwood Tower Apartments, and county documentation records up to 200 or more burials likely remaining beneath the parking lot.

=== Advocacy ===
The cemetery's fate became a public controversy in the mid-2010s during the county's Westbard sector planning process, and Macedonia Baptist Church emerged as the organizing center of efforts to protect the site. The church's Social Justice Ministry grew into the Bethesda African Cemetery Coalition, a nonprofit coalition of volunteers, activists, community groups, and faith institutions that seeks to halt what it characterizes as the desecration of the cemetery, to preserve the history of the River Road community, and to consecrate the site with a memorial and museum. Church member Marsha Coleman-Adebayo has led the coalition, which has held regular demonstrations at the site, at times multiple days each week.

In December 2017 the church formally asked the Montgomery County Historic Preservation Commission to list the roughly one-acre cemetery tract in the county's atlas and index of historic sites, as an interim protection while research proceeded toward a nomination to the county's Master Plan for Historic Preservation. The request followed the county Planning Board's approval that month of a self-storage facility at 5204 River Road over the church's objections that construction could affect the burial ground; the developer in that case agreed to convey land that could include part of the cemetery to the county parks system and to help fund an archaeological assessment. The campaign has drawn national attention, including support from the Rev. William Barber II and coverage in the national and international press.

=== Litigation ===
In August 2021, after the Housing Opportunities Commission of Montgomery County (HOC) approved a letter of intent to sell the Westwood Tower property for about $51 million to the developer Charger Ventures, the coalition — with the church's pastor among the plaintiffs — sued in the Circuit Court for Montgomery County, arguing that state law required court approval before a burial ground could be sold for another use. The case reached the Supreme Court of Maryland, which ruled on August 30, 2024, that Moses Cemetery "was a historic Black burial place" in which human remains likely remain interred, that the statute invoked did not require HOC to obtain court permission before a sale, and that Maryland's common law of burial places allows descendants to pursue claims and remedies, remanding the case to the circuit court. The court's opinion identified the Rev. Olusegun Adebayo as pastor of Macedonia Baptist Church, located near the burial ground.

On remand, the plaintiffs amended their complaint to assert claims for violation of the right of sepulcher and intentional infliction of emotional distress, seeking damages and injunctive relief; in February 2025 the circuit court ruled favorably on their motion for equitable relief. Reporting on the litigation has placed the damages sought at $40 million and noted that Charger Ventures withdrew from the purchase amid the controversy.

== Historic status ==
As of the mid-2020s, neither the church building nor the cemetery site had received designation on Montgomery County's Master Plan for Historic Preservation or listing on the National Register of Historic Places; the church has stated that its earlier designation request received no response and that it has lacked the resources to pursue the matter further. The church and the River Road community are documented in the National Park Service's 2022 historic resources study of African-American communities along the Chesapeake and Ohio Canal.

== See also ==
- River Road (community)
- Freedmen's town
- African-American cemeteries
- Black church
