= Trinity Memorial Methodist Episcopal Church =

Historic church in West Virginia, United States

- U.S. National Register of Historic Places
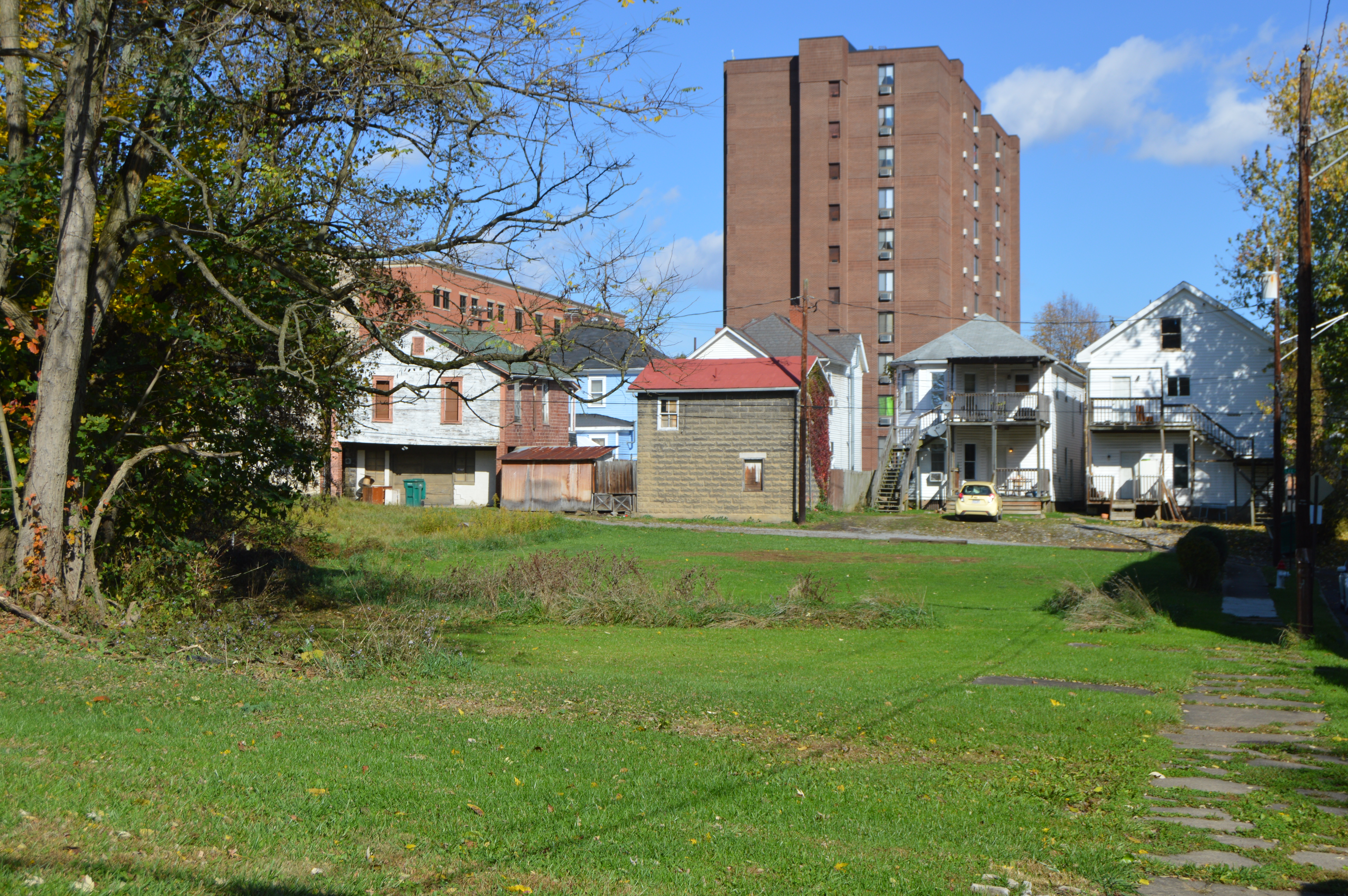
- Site of the church

- Location within West Virginia Location within the United States
- Location: 420 Ben St., Clarksburg, West Virginia
- Coordinates: 39°16′37″N 80°20′11″W
- Area: 0.3 acres (0.12 ha)
- Built: 1902
- NRHP reference No.: 84003584
- Added to NRHP: April 26, 1984

The Trinity Memorial Methodist Episcopal Church, also known as Trinity Methodist Church, was a historic Methodist Episcopal church at 420 Ben Street in Clarksburg, Harrison County, West Virginia. It was built in 1902, and was a modest late-Victorian Gothic-Romanesque style brick structure. It was a two-story rectangular building with a slate covered gable roof. It featured a three-story, square bell tower with an open belfry.

It was listed on the National Register of Historic Places in 1984. Since that time, it has been demolished.
