= Embry Chapel Church =

- U.S. National Register of Historic Places
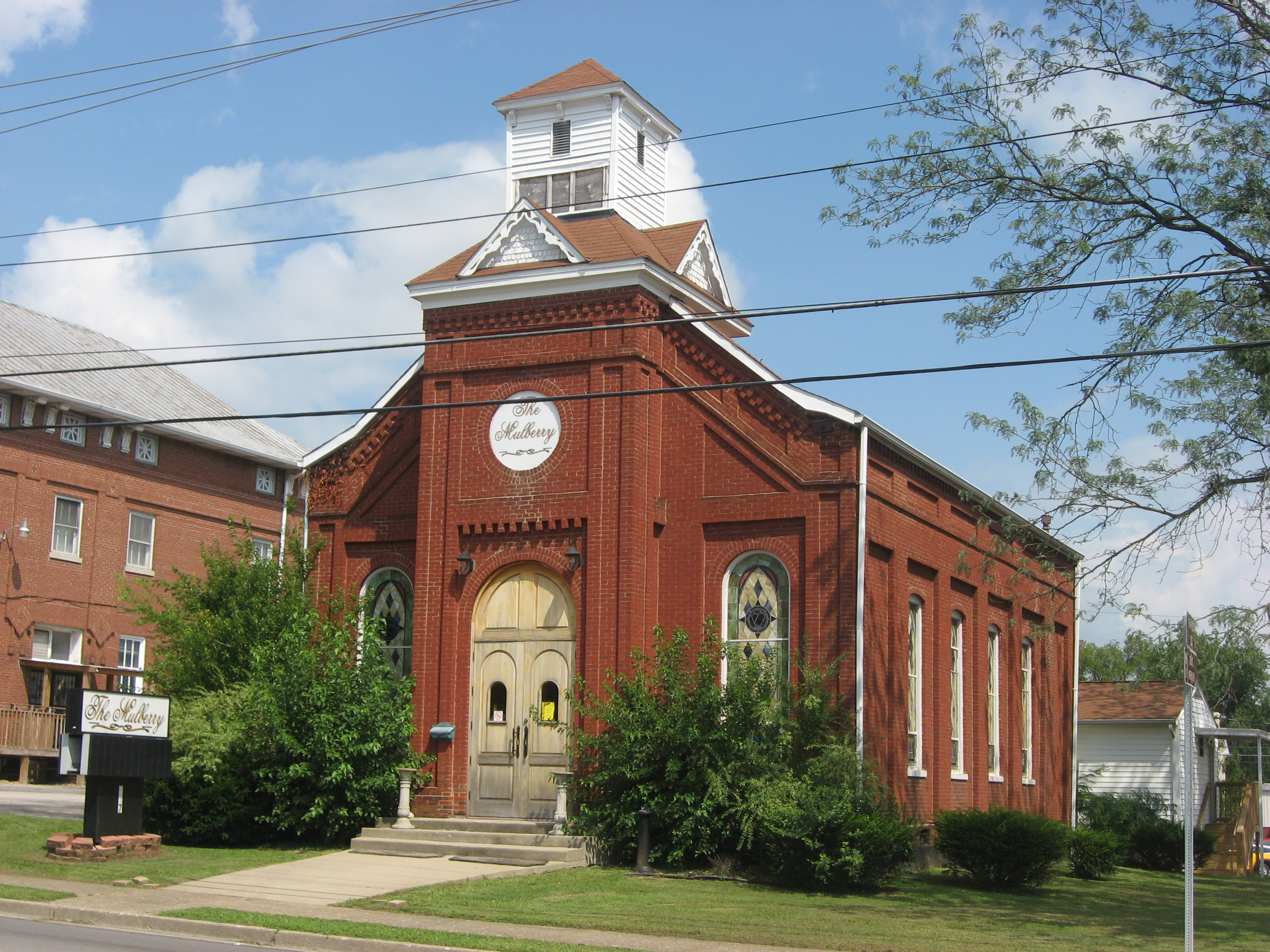

- Location within Kentucky Location within the United States
- Location: 117 Mulberry St., Elizabethtown, Kentucky
- Coordinates: 37°41′40″N 85°51′38″W
- Area: less than one acre
- Built: 1868
- Architectural style: Romanesque Revival
- MPS: Hardin County MRA
- NRHP reference No.: 88001803
- Added to NRHP: October 4, 1988

The Embry Chapel Church, at 117 Mulberry St. in Elizabethtown, Kentucky, was built in 1868 to serve the Second Presbyterian Church, and was sold in 1891 to an African Methodist Episcopal congregation which had formed in 1865. It was listed on the National Register of Historic Places in 1988.

It is a one-story brick church built with Romanesque Revival style. It has a square bell tower rising from the center of its front facade, with the original arched entrance and brick corbels. Stained glass windows are recessed in brick bays separated by pilasters. There is a c.1970 one-story frame addition at the rear.
