= Mather Homestead (Hartford, Connecticut) =

Historic house in Connecticut, United States

- U.S. National Register of Historic Places
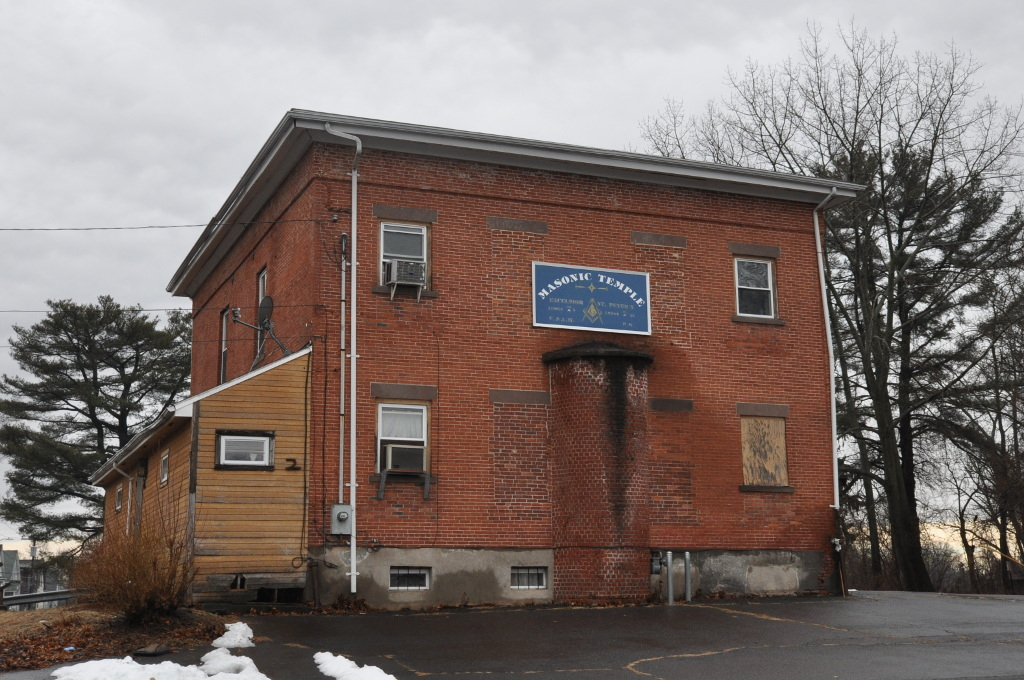

- Location within Connecticut Location within the United States
- Location: 2 Mahl Avenue, Hartford, Connecticut
- Coordinates: 41°46′54″N 72°40′36″W
- Area: less than one acre
- Built: 1835
- Architectural style: Greek Revival
- NRHP reference No.: 82004426
- Added to NRHP: April 29, 1982

The Mather Homestead is a historic house at 2 Mahl Avenue in Hartford, Connecticut. Built about 1835, it is a rare surviving example of a 19th-century farmstead in the city. Its adaptive reuse over time is also indicative of the transformation of its surrounds by increasing urbanization. It was listed on the National Register of Historic Places in 1982. It is now home to a chapter of Masons.

== Description and history ==
The Mather Homestead is located in the Clay-Arsenal neighborhood on Hartford's north side, on the north side of Mahl Avenue just west of Main Street, the historic main road between downtown Hartford and Windsor. It is a two-story brick building, covered by a low-pitch hip roof. Its main facade faces south, and is asymmetrically arranged, with three closely spaced windows at the center of the second floor and one at the left end. The first floor is sheltered by a full-width porch with six Doric columns, and has a center entrance. An ell extends to the left side at a recess.

The house was built sometime between 1835 and 1843 by William Mather. It remained an agricultural property until 1893, when the farm was subdivided for residential development. The house originally had a Main Street address, which changed when Mahl Avenue was opened in that year. After a period of domestic use, it was converted into a synagogue in 1926, and was acquired by what is now known as the Esp Masonic Lodge in 1954. The lodge, chartered in 1859, is one of the oldest African-American civic organizations in the city.

== See also ==
- National Register of Historic Places listings in Hartford, Connecticut
