= Sandy Ground Historic Archeological District =

Historic district in Staten Island, New York

- U.S. National Register of Historic Places
- U.S. Historic district
- Nearest city: New York, New York
- Area: 158 acres (64 ha)
- Built: 1830
- NRHP reference No.: 82003398
- Added to NRHP: September 23, 1982

Sandy Ground Historic Archeological is a historic archaeological site and national historic district located at Sandy Ground, Staten Island, New York. The district encompasses three contributing buildings and one contributing site.

It was added to the National Register of Historic Places in 1982.
