= Public School No. 111 =

Historic former school in Maryland, USA

- U.S. National Register of Historic Places
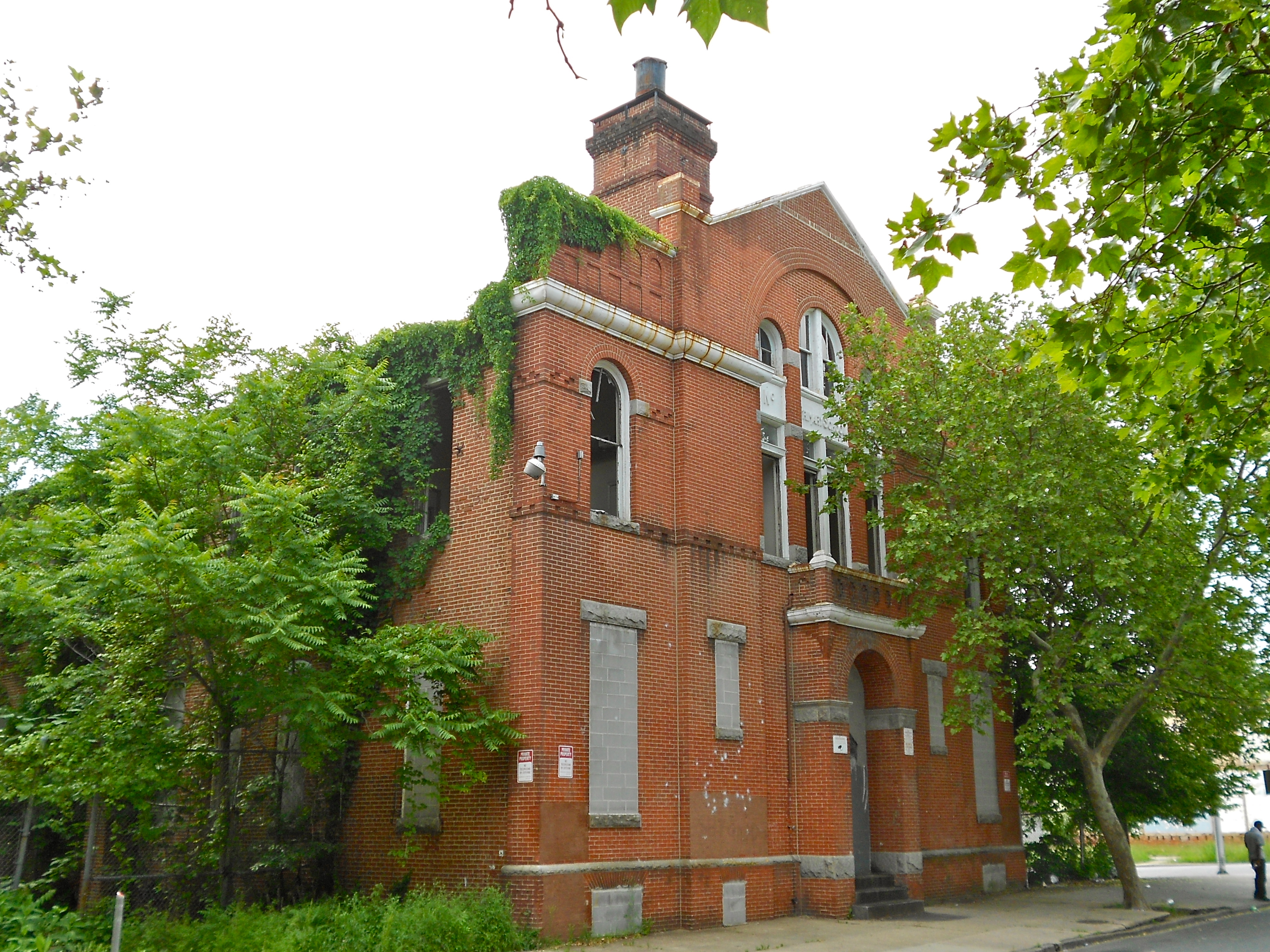
- Public School No. 111, May 2013

- Location within Baltimore Location within Maryland Location within the United States
- Location: N. Carrollton Ave. and Riggs Ave., Baltimore, Maryland
- Coordinates: 39°18′4″N 76°38′15″W
- Area: 0.4 acres (0.16 ha)
- Built: 1889
- Architectural style: Romanesque
- NRHP reference No.: 79003219
- Added to NRHP: September 25, 1979

Public School No. 111, also known as Francis Ellen Harper School, is a historic elementary school located at Baltimore, Maryland, United States. It is a Romanesque brick structure that features an ornately detailed brick front façade. It was built in 1889 as Colored School #9 and is one of the few surviving schools built for black children and staffed by black teachers. The school is named after Francis Ellen Harper (1825-1911), a Baltimore-born African American poet.

Public School No. 111 was listed on the National Register of Historic Places in 1979.
