= List of people from Indianapolis =

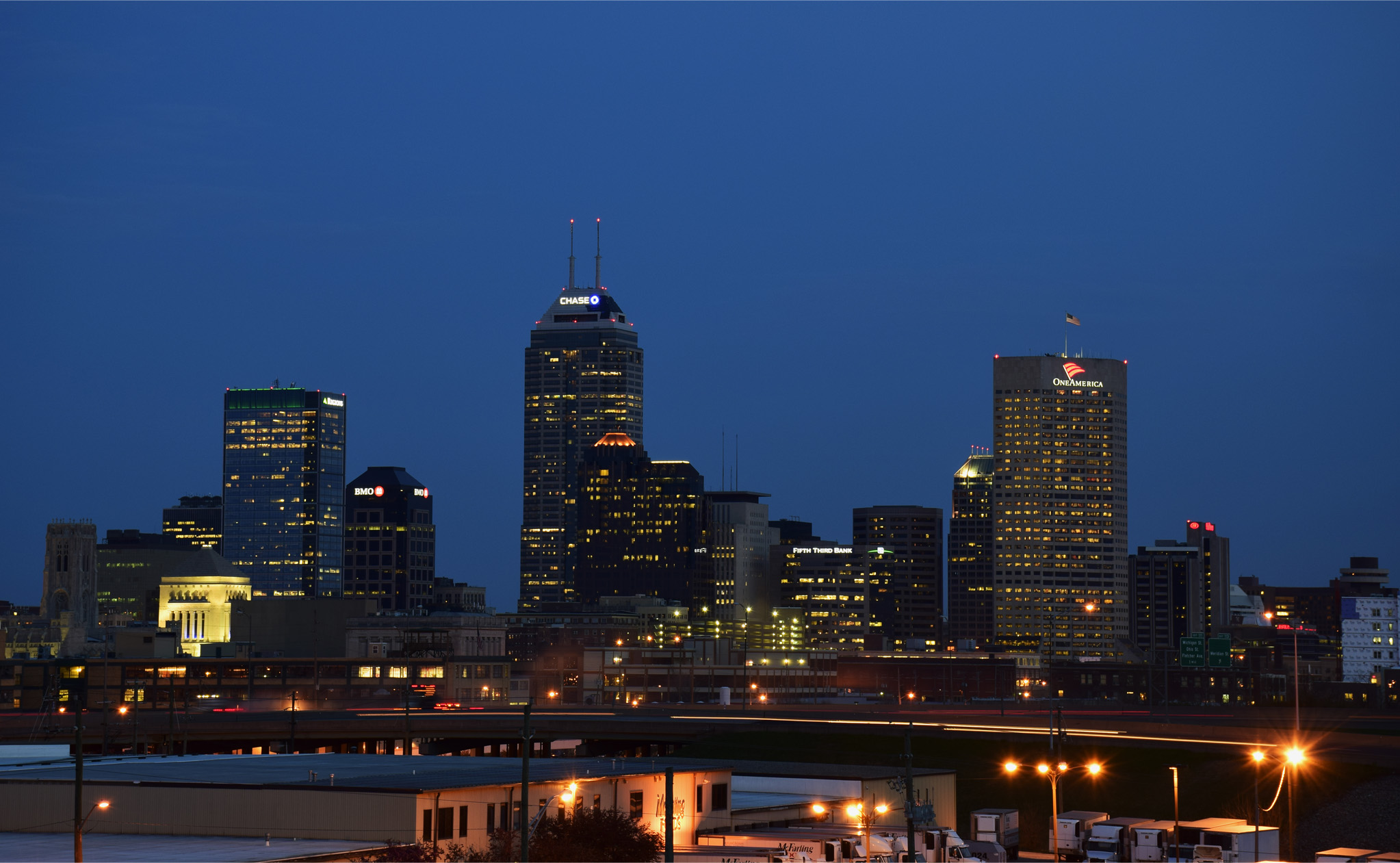
Indianapolis skyline

The following is a list of notable people who have been born or lived in Indianapolis, Indiana. Organized alphabetically by field of study and then by last name.

== Actors ==
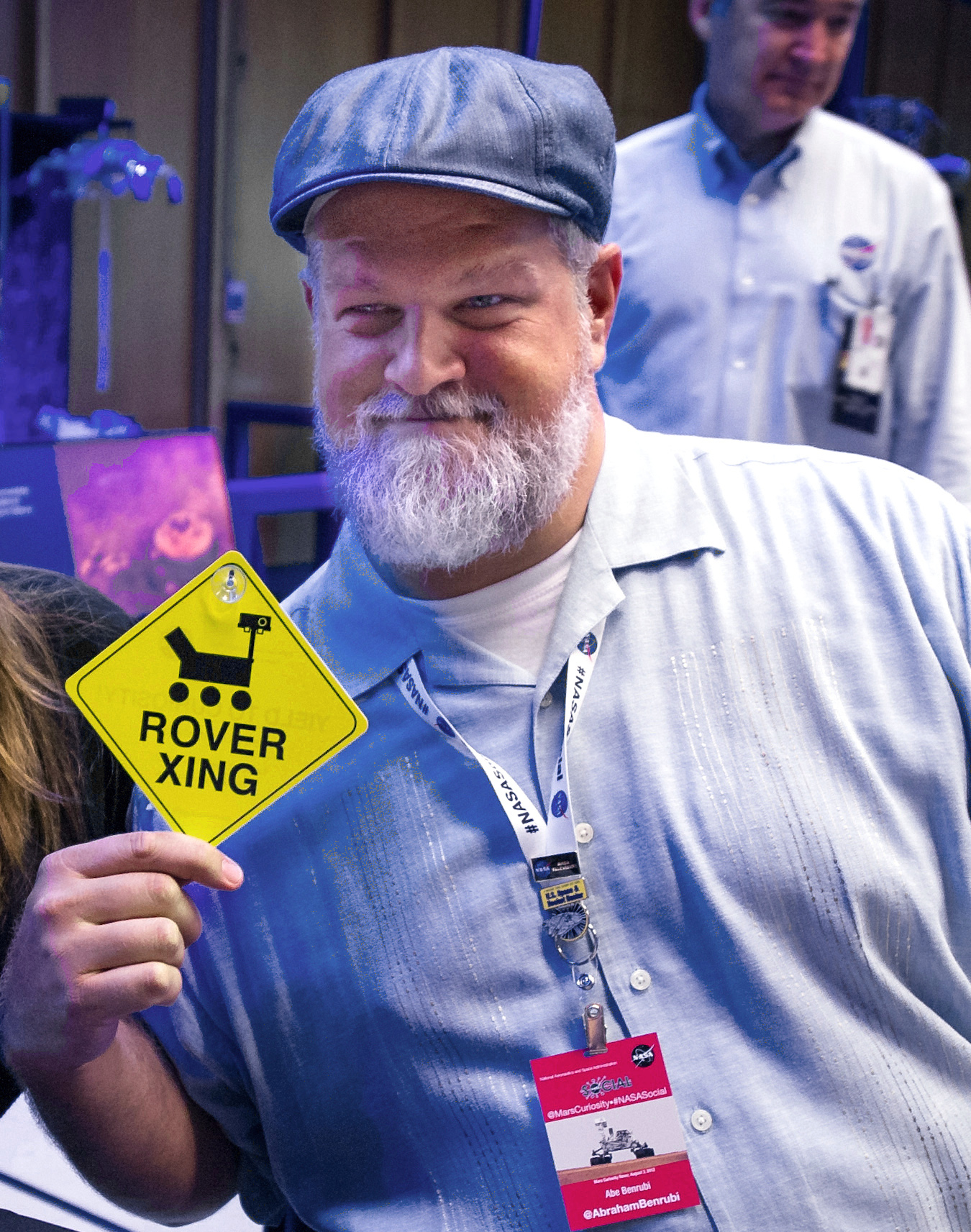
Abraham Benrubi

- Abraham Benrubi (1969– ), actor, best known for ER and Parker Lewis Can't Lose
- Monte Blue (1887–1963), silent film/character actor
- Connie Booth (1944– ), actress, screenwriter
- Steve Burton (1970– ), television actor
- Joyce DeWitt (1949– ), actress, best known for Three's Company
- Cullen Douglas (1967– ), actor, producer, director, best known for Grey's Anatomy and Pure Genius
- Robert Emhardt (1914–1994), actor
- Mike Epps (1970– ), stand-up comedian, actor, producer, writer, rapper
- Frances Farmer (1913–1970), actress
- Rhett Fisher (1980– ), actor, best known for Power Rangers: Lightspeed Rescue
- Brendan Fraser (1968– ), film actor
- Ken Foree (1948– ), actor
- Vivica A. Fox (1964– ), actress
- Chase Infiniti (2000– ), actress
- Doug Jones (1960– ), actor
- Brook Kerr (1973– ), actress
- Priscilla Lawson (1914–1958), actress
- Marjorie Main (1890–1975), actress
- Steve McQueen (1930–1980), Academy Award-nominated actor
- Julie McWhirter (1947– ), actress
- Margo Moore (1931–2000), actress
- Dohn Norwood(1974– ) actor, Hell on Wheels
- Katy O'Brian (1989– ), actress
- Dayo Okeniyi (1988– ), film actor
- Jake Short (1997– ), actor
- Steve Talley (1981– ), television/film actor
- Harry von Zell (1906–1981), television/film actor and radio announcer, best known for The George Burns and Gracie Allen Show
- Clifton Webb (1889–1966), stage/film actor
- Sasheer Zamata (1986– ), comedian, actress, former cast member on Saturday Night Live

== Artists ==
- Vija Celmins (1938– ), visual artist
- Don Gummer, artist
- John Wesley Hardrick (1891–1968), artist
- Ron McQueeney, photographer
- Wilhelmina Seegmiller (1866–1913), author, illustrator, art teacher
- Sheida Soleimani (1990–), contemporary artist, born in Indianapolis
- Jeremy Spencer, musician (1973– )

== Athletes ==
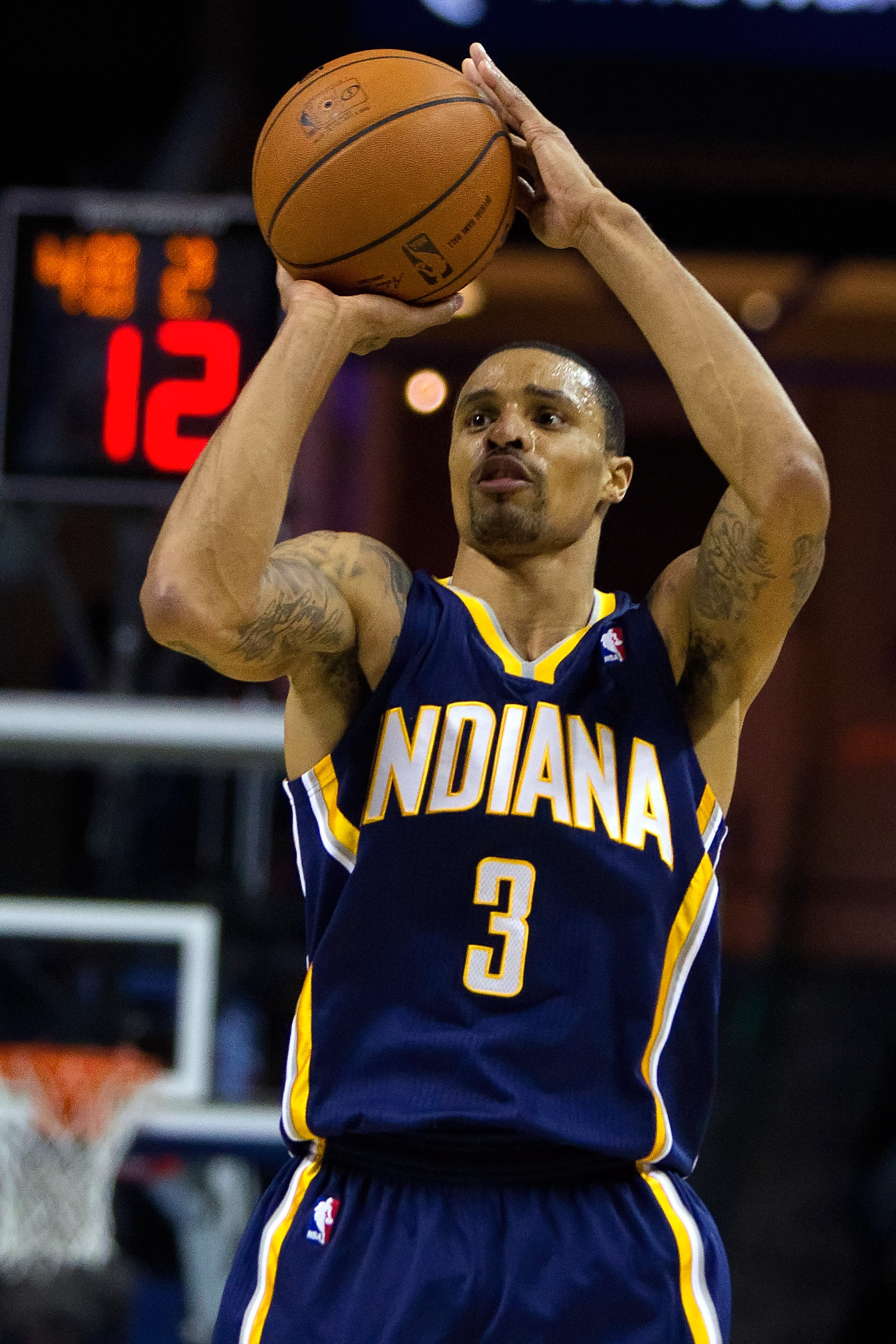
George Hill

- Joe Amico (1995– ), soccer player
- Sarah Bacon (1996– ), Olympic diver
- George Bailey (1900–1940), IndyCar Series driver
- Jalen Brown (1995– ), soccer player
- Kevin Burns (1985– ), soccer player
- Donie Bush (1887–1972), Major League Baseball (MLB) player/manager/scout
- Bryce Campbell (1994– ), played for the United States national rugby union team
- Rodney Carney (1984– ), National Basketball Association (NBA) player
- Oscar Charleston (1896–1954), baseball player, member of Baseball Hall of Fame
- Mike Clark (1972– ), soccer player
- Josh Coan (1998– ), soccer player
- Mike Conley Jr. (1987– ), NBA player
- Hooks Dauss (1889–1963), MLB player
- Euphrasia Donnelly (1905–1963), swimmer, Olympic gold medalist (1924)
- Stu Douglass (1990– ), American-Israeli basketball player for the Israeli team Maccabi Ashdod
- Jack Doyle (1990– ), National Football League (NFL) tight end
- Daeshon Francis (born 1996), basketball guard in the Israeli Basketball Premier League
- Jeff George (1967– ), NFL quarterback
- Eric Gordon (1988– ), NBA player
- Greg Graham (1970– ), NBA player
- Marcellus Greene (1957– ), NFL player
- Gordon Hayward (1990– ), NBA player
- Alan Henderson (1972– ), NBA player
- John F. Hennessey (1900–1981), tennis player (1920s)
- Oral Hildebrand (1907–1977), MLB All-Star pitcher
- George Hill (1986– ), NBA player
- Cole Hocker (2001– ), distance runner, Olympic champion
- Lauren Holiday (1987– ), US Women's National Soccer player, Olympic gold medalist, 2015 Women's World Cup champion
- Lester Horton (1906–1953), dancer and choreographer
- Tommy Hunter (1986– ), Major League baseball pitcher for Philadelphia Phillies
- Kenny Irwin (1969–2000), NASCAR driver
- Jack Johnson (1987– ) NHL player
- Mathias Kiwanuka (1983– ), NFL player
- Ken Klee (1971– ), National Hockey League (NHL) player
- Chuck Klein (1904–1958), MLB player
- Kyle Krisiloff (1986– ), NASCAR driver
- Shawn Langdon (2007– ), NHRA funny car driver 2013; Top Fuel Champion; 2-time Super Comp Champion
- Brad Leaf (1960–), American-Israeli basketball player for Hapoel Galil Elyon and Maccabi Tel Aviv of the Israel Premier League
- Courtney Lee (1985– ), NBA player
- Don Leppert (1931–2023 ), MLB player
- Lori Lindsey (1980– ), U.S. Women's National Soccer player, Olympic gold medalist
- Maicel Malone-Wallace (1969– ), sprinter, Olympic gold medalist (1996)
- Zack Martin (1990– ), NFL player
- George McGinnis (1950– ), NBA player
- Frank McKinney (1938–1992), diver, Olympic gold medalist (1960), banking executive
- Terry McLaurin (1995–), Ohio State Buckeyes and Washington Redskins wide receiver
- Eric Montross (1971– ), NBA player
- Logan Neidlinger (2005– ), soccer player
- Greg Oden (1988– ), NBA player
- Jaycie Phelps (1979– ), gymnast, Olympic gold medalist (1996), Magnificent Seven team member
- Austin Price (born 1995), basketball player in the Israeli Premier Basketball League
- Derrick Ransom (1976– ), National Football League (NFL) player defensive tackle
- Matt Reiswerg (born 1980), soccer player, coach, and administrator
- Zion Richardson (2001– ), basketball player
- Oscar Robertson (1938– ), basketball player, member of Basketball Hall of Fame
- Sally Schantz, figure skater, U.S. ice dancing champion (1963)
- Judy Schwomeyer (1950– ), figure skater, U.S. ice dancing champion (1968–1972)
- Nike Sibande (1999–), basketball player in the Israeli Premier Basketball League
- Sandra Spuzich (1937–2015), LPGA pro golfer
- Brad Stevens (1976– ), President of Basketball Operations and former head coach of the Boston Celtics
- Major Taylor (1878–1932), cyclist
- Jeff Teague (1988– ), NBA player
- Johnny Weaver (1935–2008), pro wrestler, first to use the sleeper hold "Weaver Lock"
- Randy Wittman (1959– ), NBA head coach
- Greg Wojciechowski (1951– ), wrestler
- Sean Woods (1970– ), college basketball coach
- T. J. Yates (1987–), former quarterback; wide receivers coach for the Atlanta Falcons

== Business and philanthropy ==
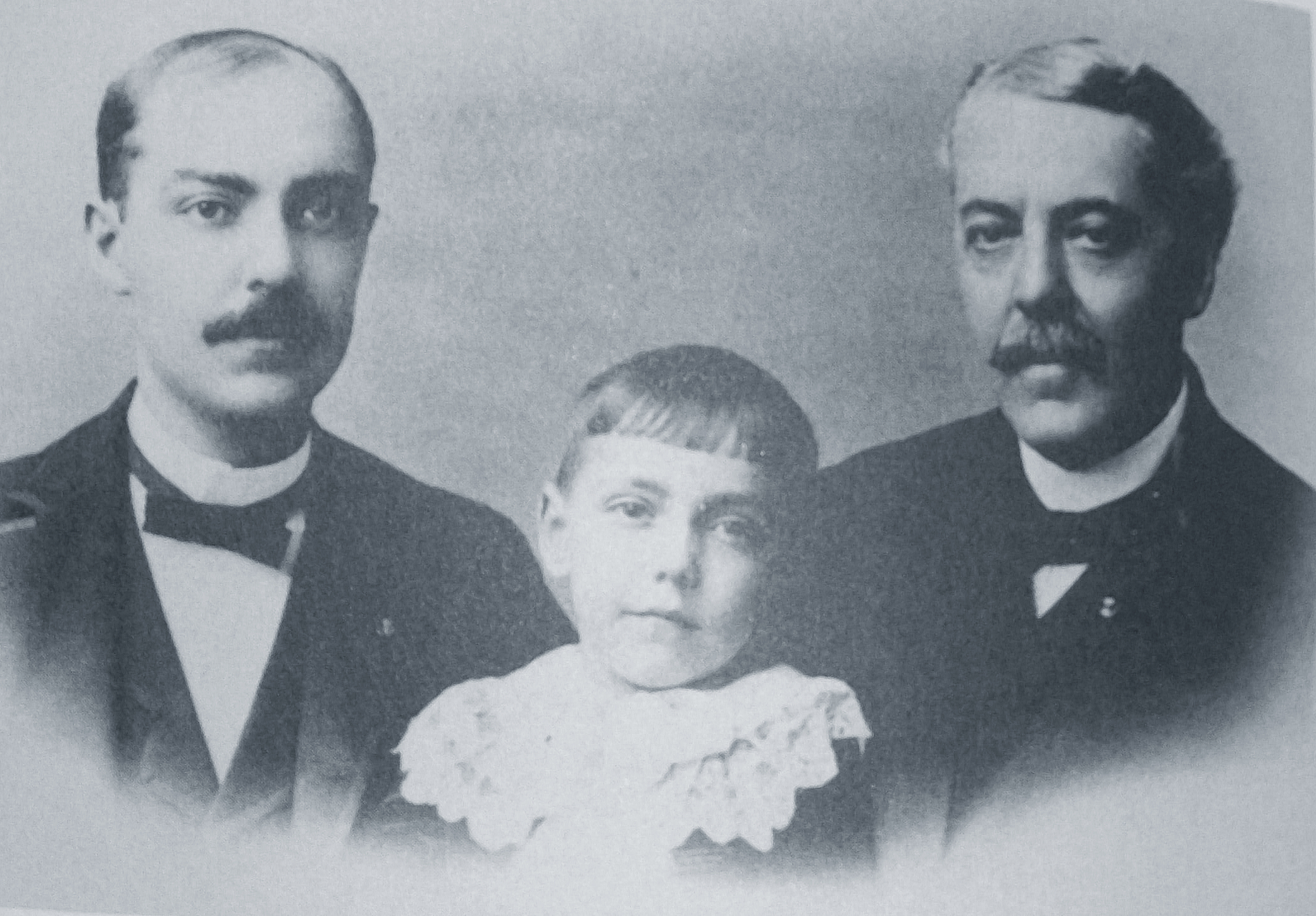
Colonel Eli Lilly (right) with son Josiah K. Lilly Sr. (left) and grandson Eli Lilly (center)

- Steve Bellamy, sports media entrepreneur, founder of The Ski Channel and The Tennis Channel
- Steve Ells, founder, CEO of Chipotle Mexican Grill
- Scott Flanders, businessman and former CEO of Playboy, Inc.
- John Geisse, businessman, founder of Target Stores
- Bob Glenalvin, first manager of Detroit Tigers
- Sid Grauman, founder of Grauman's Chinese Theatre in Hollywood, former home of the Academy Awards
- Scott A. Jones, co-founder of ChaCha
- Eli Lilly, founder, president of pharmaceutical company Eli Lilly and Company
- Josiah K. Lilly Sr., president of pharmaceutical company Eli Lilly and Company
- Ruth Lilly, philanthropist
- Kim Ng, Major League Baseball executive
- Ewald Over, entrepreneur
- Freeman Ransom, lawyer, businessman, civic leader
- Willard Ransom, lawyer, businessman, civic leader
- Henry J. Richardson Jr., lawyer and civil rights activist, member of the Indiana House of Representatives (1932–36), and a judge in Marion County, Indiana.
- Madam C.J. Walker, pioneering African-American businesswoman, first female self-made millionaire in America
- Margaret Ray Wickens (1843–1918), organizer and social reformer

== Criminals ==
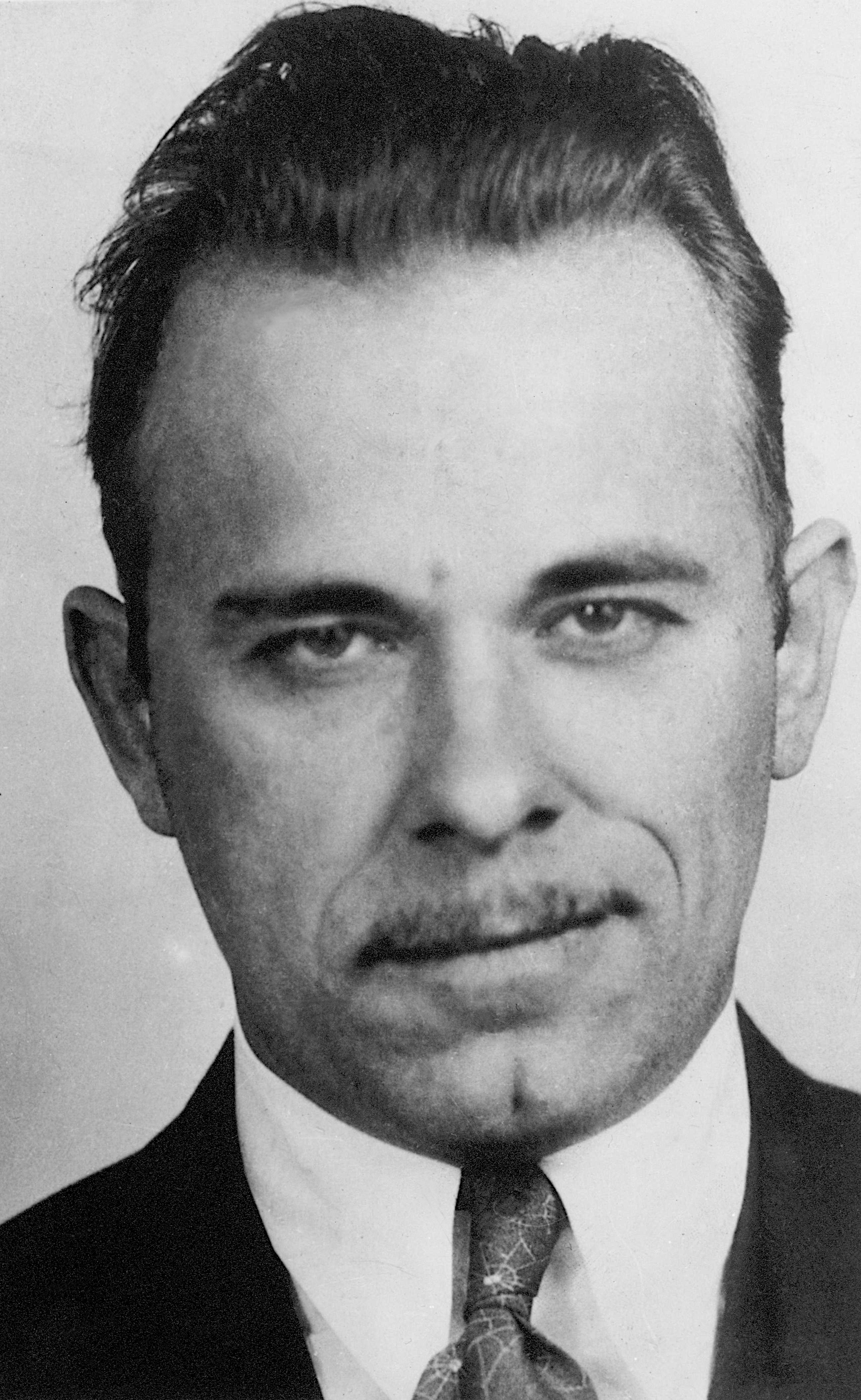
John Dillinger

- Howard Allen, serial killer
- Herb Baumeister, suspected serial killer
- Melvin Carr, murderer, rapist, and suspected serial killer
- John Dillinger, bank robber
- Cecil Henry Floyd, serial killer
- Jared Fogle, Subway restaurant endorser, motivational speaker, and convicted child pornographer
- Jim Jones, cult leader and mass murderer who led the Peoples Temple between 1955 and 1978

== Entertainment ==
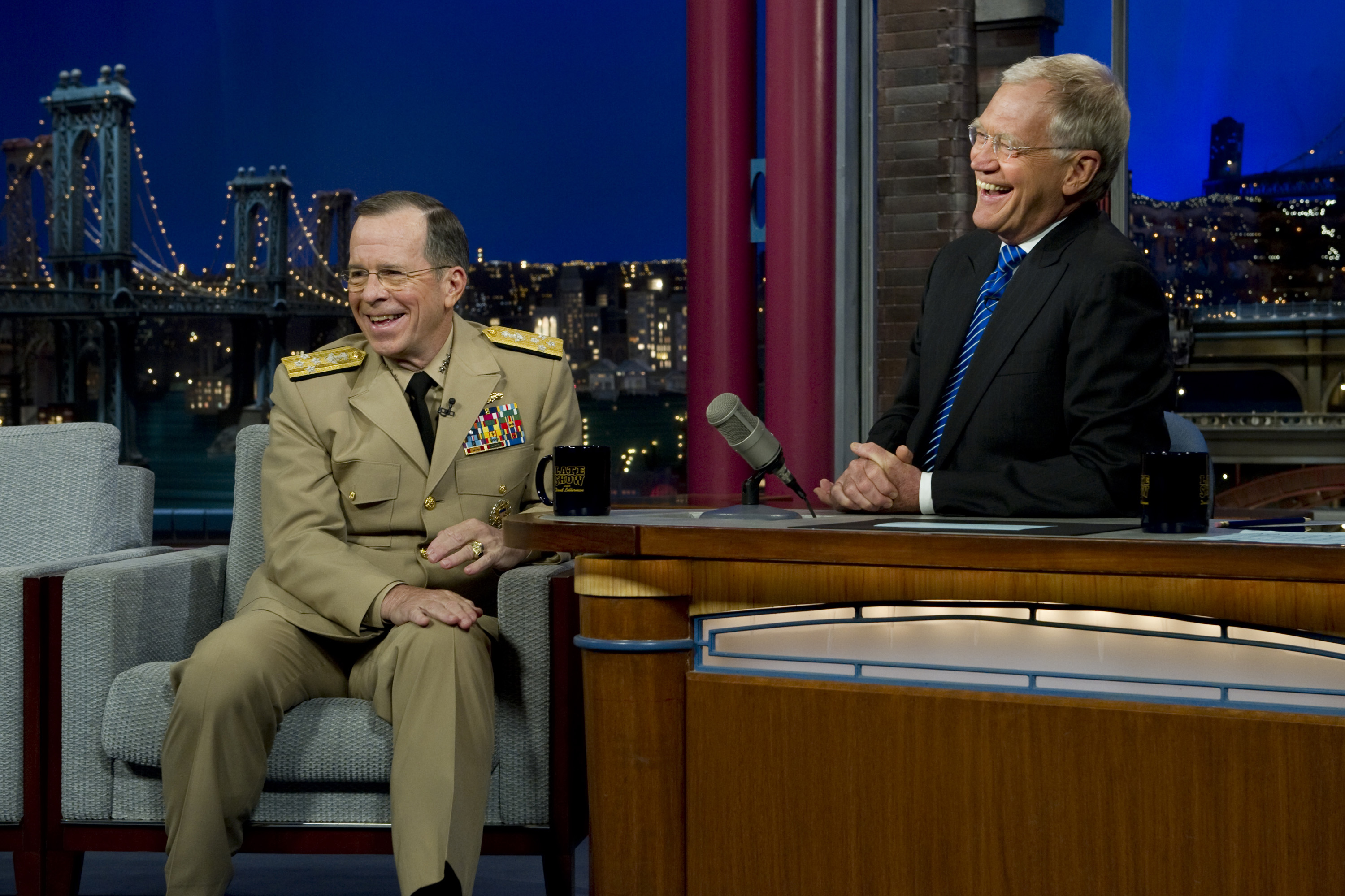
David Letterman

- Rupert Boneham, reality show contestant, Survivor: Pearl Islands, Survivor: All-Stars, Survivor: Heroes vs. Villains, Survivor: Blood vs. Water; politician
- June Cochran, model, Miss Indiana USA 1960, Playboy magazine's Playmate of the Year 1963
- Ken Hixon, screenwriter
- David Letterman, television personality, former host of The Late Show (1993–2015)
- Ryan Murphy, film and television screenwriter, director, and producer, notably Nip/Tuck, American Horror Story and Glee
- Blair St. Clair (Andrew Bryson), drag performer
- Marc Summers, game show host, television personality
- Dan Wakefield, screenwriter, novelist
- Marjorie Wallace, Miss World 1973

== Journalists and media ==
- Roy Blount Jr., journalist, author
- Scott Evans, television personality
- Louis McHenry Howe, reporter for the New York Herald; political advisor to President Franklin D. Roosevelt
- Jack Olsen, journalist and author
- Jane Pauley, television personality, journalist
- Myrta Pulliam, Pulitzer Prize-winning journalist

== Military ==
- Timothy Maude, U.S. Army lieutenant general, the highest-ranking military officer killed in the September 11 attacks
- Thomas A. Morris, railroad executive, civil engineer, Union general in the Civil War
- Norris W. Overton, U.S. Air Force brigadier general
- Raymond A. Spruance, commander of the U.S. Fifth Fleet (1944–1945)

== Musicians ==
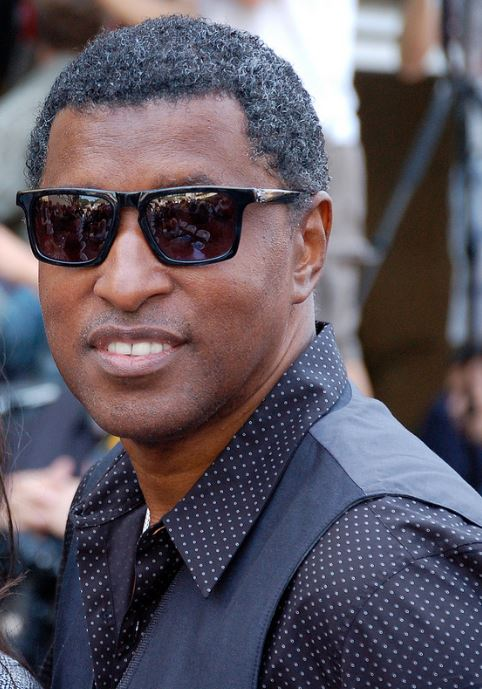
Kenneth Babyface

- Mark Battles, rapper-songwriter, founder of record label Fly America
- Scrapper Blackwell, blues musician and songwriter, writer of the earliest version of "Sweet Home Chicago"
- Carl Broemel, multi-instrumentalist, member of My Morning Jacket
- Darrell Clanton, singer
- Dorian, hip-hop recording artist and music producer
- Kenneth "Babyface" Edmonds, R&B music producer/performer
- Guitar Pete Franklin, blues musician
- Jan Garber, bandleader
- Blind Leroy Garnett, boogie-woogie and ragtime pianist and songwriter
- Thurston Harris, singer, songwriter
- Billy Henderson, singer, member of The Spinners
- John Hiatt, musician
- Freddie Hubbard, jazz trumpeter
- J. J. Johnson, jazz trombonist
- Josh Kaufman, singer-songwriter, contestant on The Voice (U.S. Season 6)
- Adam Lambert, singer, runner-up of American Idol (Season 8)
- Adrianne Lenker, musician, singer songwriter of the indie band Big Thief
- Ted Leo, musician
- Charles Scott Leonard, member of the a cappella group Rockapella
- Lily & Madeleine, folk duo
- Margot & the Nuclear So and So's, indie rock band formed in Indianapolis
- Tim McIlrath, musician
- Wes Montgomery, jazz guitarist
- Plumb, singer/songwriter
- Hal Rayle, voice artist
- Larry Ridley, jazz bassist
- David Michael Schuster, opera singer
- George Shirley, operatic tenor
- Noble Sissle, composer
- Tiara Thomas, singer-songwriter
- Albert Von Tilzer, composer, notably "Take Me Out to the Ball Game"
- Pharez Whitted, jazz trumpeter
- Keke Wyatt, R&B singer

== Politicians ==
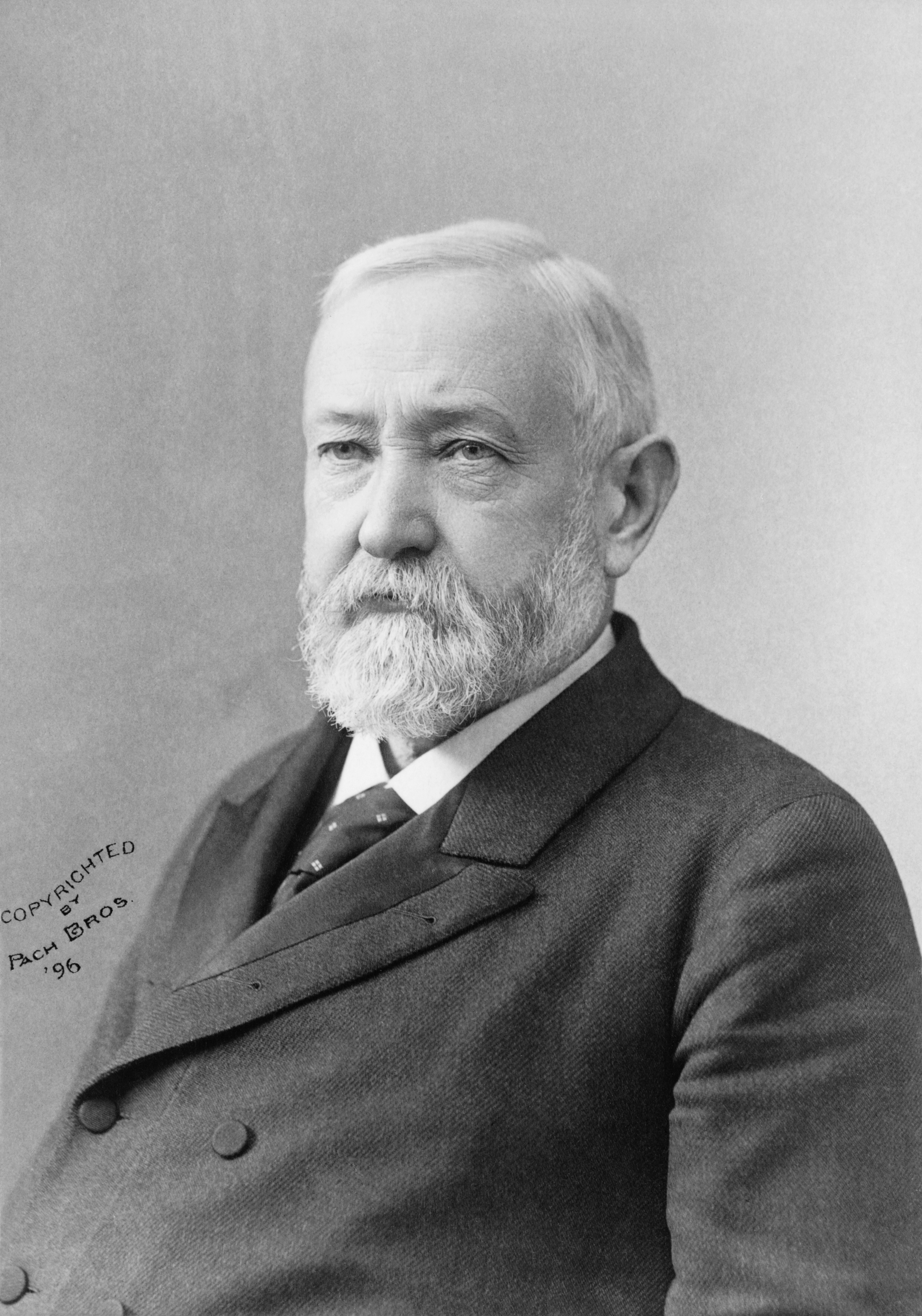
Benjamin Harrison, 21st president of the United States

- James Bingham, Indiana attorney general (1907–1911)
- Maria Cantwell, U.S. senator from Washington
- Paul Cantwell, Indiana state representative
- André Carson, member of the U.S. House of Representatives for Indiana, second Muslim to be elected to the U.S. Congress (2008)
- Julia Carson, member of the U.S. House of Representatives for Indiana; grandmother of André Carson
- Harriette Bailey Conn, state representative and the first African American to serve as Indiana's state public defender
- Ray Crowe, basketball coach and politician
- John J. Dillon, Indiana attorney general (1965–1969)
- Charles W. Fairbanks, 26th vice president of the United States (1905–1909)
- William T. Francis, U.S. ambassador to Liberia (1927–1929)
- Benjamin Harrison, 23rd president of the United States (1889–1893); lived and died in Indianapolis
- Thomas A. Hendricks, 21st vice president of the United States (1863–1869)
- Eric Holcomb, governor of Indiana
- William A. Ketcham, Indiana attorney general (1894–1898), commander-in-chief of the Grand Army of the Republic (1920–1921)
- Jon Krahulik, justice of the Indiana Supreme Court (1990–1993)
- Daisy Riley Lloyd, first African-American woman to serve in the Indiana legislature
- Richard Lugar, U.S. senator from Indiana
- Frank E. McKinney, Democratic Party chairman
- Mike Pence, 48th vice president of the United States (2017–2021)
- Dan Quayle, 44th vice president of the United States (1989–1993)
- Mike Quigley, U.S. representative for Illinois
- Charles Ray, justice of the Indiana Supreme Court (1865–1871)
- Jefferson Shreve, U.S. representative for Indiana
- Pat Spearman, politician, cleric, veteran
- Edwin K. Steers, Indiana attorney general (1953–1965)
- Ted Stevens, U.S. senator from Alaska
- Mark Warner, U.S. senator from Virginia

== Writers ==
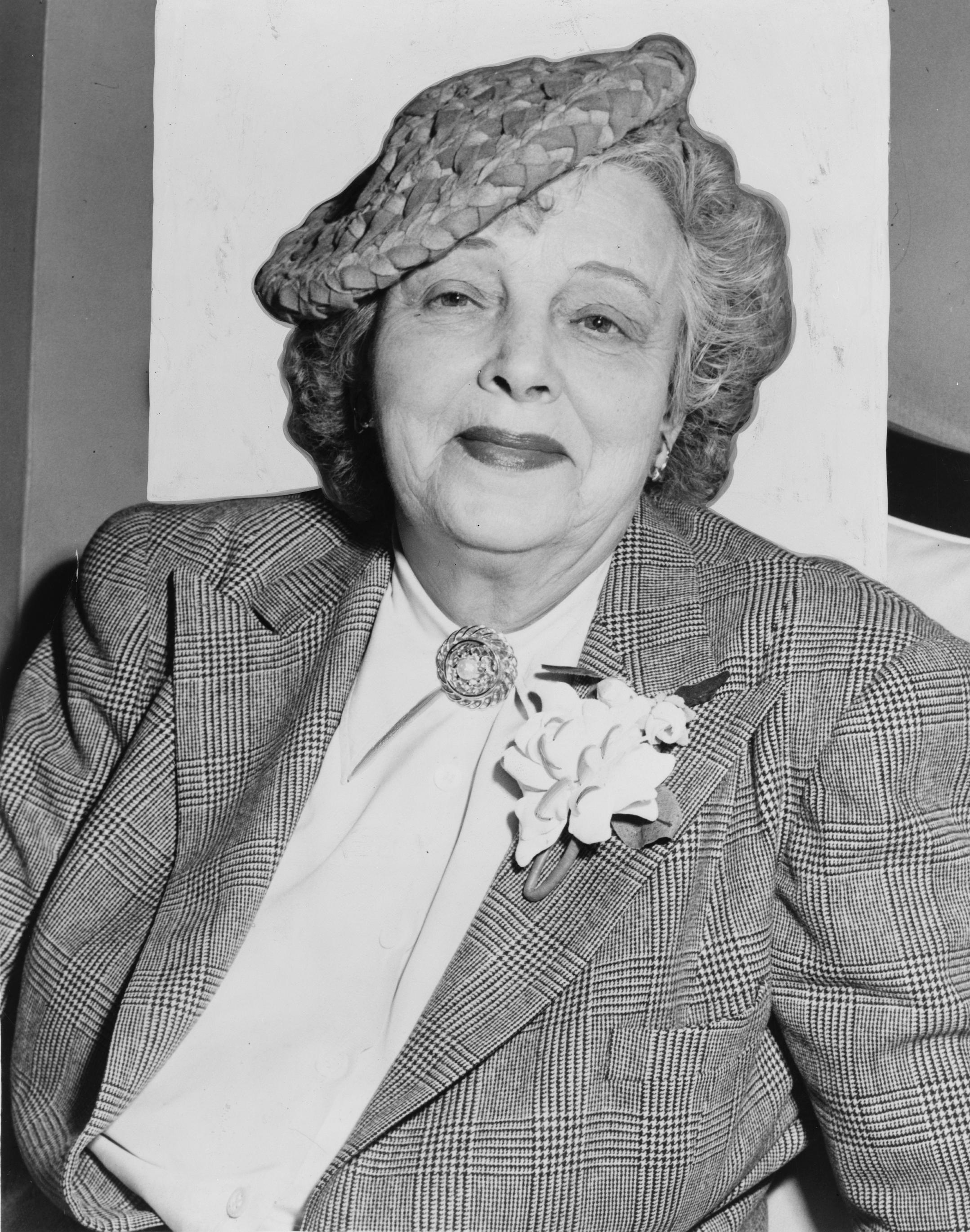
Margaret C. Anderson

- Georgia Alexander (1868–1928), textbook author and educator
- Grace Alexander (1872–1951), writer, journalist, teacher
- Margaret C. Anderson, critic, editor and publisher
- John David Anderson (1975– ), children's book author of Ms. Bixby's Last Day, 2017 Indiana Authors Award Winner
- Allan Bloom, philosopher and essayist
- A'Lelia Bundles (1952– ), TV producer, journalist, and author of On Her Own Ground: The Life and Times of Madam C.J. Walker
- Jared Carter (1939– ), poet, author of Work, for the Night Is Coming (1981), and winner of the Walt Whitman Award and the Poets' Prize
- Matt Dellinger (1975– ), author of Interstate 69: The Unfinished History of the Last Great American Highway
- Elliot Engel, writer, lecturer, and dramatist
- Mari Evans (1923–2017), poet, author of I Am a Black Woman (1970), winner of the Black Academy of Arts and Letters poetry award
- Janet Flanner, Paris correspondent of The New Yorker
- Hildegarde Flanner, poet
- John Green, novelist and writer, including of The Fault in Our Stars; YouTuber
- Alex Hall, author of Ben Drowned (2010)
- Joseph Hayes, author
- Phillip Hoose (1947– ), children's book author of Claudette Colvin: Twice Toward Justice
- Kathryn Lasky (1944– ), children's book author of Guardians of Ga'Hoole
- Charles Major, author
- Elizabeth Miller (1878–1961), novelist
- Bill Peet (1915–2002), children's book author and illustrator of Pamela Camel
- Madelyn Pugh, script-writer, I Love Lucy
- Booth Tarkington, Pulitzer Prize-winning author
- Kurt Vonnegut, author
- James Whitcomb Riley, poet
- Alice Wong, disability rights activist, founder of the Disability Visibility Project, and 2024 MacArthurs Fellow

== Other ==
- Frank J. Anderson, former sheriff of Marion County, Indiana (2003–2011)
- Dilley sextuplets, the first surviving set of sextuplets in North America
- Kent Brantly, physician, author, speaker, first American to be treated for the Ebola virus in 2014, TIME Person of the Year 2014
- Emmett I. Brown Jr., professional photographer, documented Indiana Avenue's jazz scene in the 1940s and 50s, editor Sepia magazine
- John P. Donohue, professor, doctor, pioneered treatments for testicular cancer
- Ruth M. Gardiner, first nurse killed in action during World War II
- Michael Graves, architect
- Margaret Yandes Holliday, Presbyterian missionary in Tabriz 1883–1919
- Peter Kassig, aid worker, taken hostage and ultimately beheaded by the Islamic State
- Justin Knapp, Wikipedia editor
- William H. Lawton, statistician
- Emma Messing (1872–1950), American secretary, vaudeville performer, and secretary of the American Embassy in Berlin
- John Morton-Finney, Buffalo soldier, lawyer, educator and civil rights leader
- Irvine Page, physiologist, former president of the American Heart Association (1956–1957)
- Harriet Augusta Prunk (1840–1911), educator and school founder
- John C. Rule, historian at Ohio State University
- Bill Shirk, escape artist, president of Hoosier Broadcasting Corp.
- Avriel Shull, architect
- William V. Wheeler, founder of Wheeler Mission Ministries of Indianapolis
- David A. Wolf, astronaut
- Evans Woollen III, architect, founder and principal of Woollen, Molzan and Partners
- Pamela Ayo Yetunde, Buddhist counselor, hospice worker, and educator
