= Flanner =

Flanner is a surname. Notable people with the surname include:

- Frank Flanner (1854–1912), American mortician, woodcarver, philanthropist and humanitarian
- Hildegarde Flanner (1899–1987), American poet, essayist, and playwright
- Janet Flanner (1892–1978), American writer and journalist
