= Alpha Blackburn =

American designer, businesswoman and philanthropist

- Born: Alpha Wilnet Coles; September 16, 1939 (age 86); Lynchburg, Virginia
- Education: Howard University (BA, MFA)
- Occupations: Fashion designer,interior designer, businesswoman
- Years active: 1960-
- Known for: fashion design, interior design, and philanthropy
- Spouse: Walter Blackburn (m.1959-2000)
- Children: Chi Blackburn, Anthony Blackburn, Sydney Blackburn

Alpha Blackburn is an American former television host, award-winning fashion and interior designer, and philanthropist. She also served as the president and CEO of Blackburn Architects.

== Early life and education ==
Blackburn was born September 16, 1939 in Lynchburg, Virginia. She began designing clothing while in elementary school, but observed that she had few people to help her because fashion design was not commonly known in her town. Later, she received a scholarship to attend Howard University in Washington D. C. where she graduated cum laude with a B.A in Design and an M.F.A. in Painting and Art History. She met her late husband, prominent architect from Indianapolis, Dr. Walter Scott Blackburn at Howard University. At the end of Alpha's sophomore year, the couple were married by Walter's father, Cleo W. Blackburn. They married on September 11, 1959. After graduating from Howard, she settled with her husband in Indianapolis circa 1965 and continues to be active in fashion, television, business and philanthropy. Together the couple had two sons Chi and Anthony, and a daughter Sydney.

== Career ==
=== Fashion ===
In 1965, Blackburn and her husband settled in Indianapolis, where she began her fashion career. Blackburn was a fashion model, including for L. S. Aryes. She was honored as Fashion Designer of the Year at the Flamingo Club Easter Fashion Show in April 1976. Her designs were featured in stores like L.S Aryes, Davidson's, and Gabriella. Blackburn created designs under the Alpha Originals label. In 1978, Blackburn presented her new fall and winter collection Alpha II, at Stouffer's Windsor Ballroom. She also created wedding designs.

=== Television and publishing ===
Blackburn hosted the WISH-TV show, Indy Today, in the 70s and interviewed notable celebrities. She also hosted the talk show, Indiana Illustrated.

=== Architecture ===
Blackburn and her husband established an architecture firm, Blackburn Associates Architecture in 1981, later renamed Blackburn Architects, Inc., and worked in tandem on several architecture projects. This was the first architecture firm that was African American owned in Indianapolis. She loaned her design talents with input on the interiors on their joint projects such as Indianapolis Public School 39, 500 Place, and Grace Apostolic Church. In September 1998, Blackburn Architects was named the lead architect and architect on record for the construction of the National Underground Railroad Freedom Center. This was a joint project. In the second year of the seven year project, her husband died after a battle with cancer. She decided to see the project through to its grand opening, in his honor. Upon her husband's passing, Blackburn also took over as President of Blackburn Architects, Inc. In 2019, she was inducted into the Central Indiana Business Hall of Fame.

== Philanthropy and community work ==
Blackburn impacted business in Indianapolis but also has contributed remarkably through community and philanthropic efforts. Throughout her time in Indianapolis, she has served on many boards. She served as the secretary for the board of directors of the YWCA, a member of Alliance of the Museum of Art, and the Flanner House Guild. She was also affiliated with the Indianapolis chapters of Gay Northeasterners and Links.

Blackburn has held fashion shows to benefit different causes throughout her career in fashion. In April 1973, she debuted some of her latest fashions for Fashion Project "73", where proceeds were to benefit the Harris Home for Children, which at the time was the only accredited establishment that accommodated Black children. Blackburn established the Alpha and Walter Blackburn Scholarship Fund (AWBSF) in 2004, in memory of her late husband, Walter Blackburn. Every year since 2005, she has hosted the Fashion Extravaganza, which is a fashion show that benefits AWBSF. She later launched the Alpha Blackburn Scholarship of the Arts that provides aid to young art students at the Herron School of Art and Design at IU Indianapolis. In March 2013, Blackburn was honored for her 25 years of service to the Indiana Civil Rights Commission. She was recognized by the Indiana Senate in March 2023 for her philanthropic contributions to Indianapolis.
