= DeFrantz =

DeFrantz is a surname. Notable people with the surname include:

- Anita DeFrantz (born 1952), American Olympic rower
- Faburn DeFrantz (1885–1964), American YMCA executive
