= David Schuster =

David Schuster may refer to:

- David Israel Schuster (born 1935), American chemist
- David Michael Schuster (born 1952), American tenor

== See also ==
- David Shuster (born 1967), American television journalist and talk radio host
