= Senate Avenue YMCA =

YMCA in Indianapolis, Indiana, US (1912–2002)

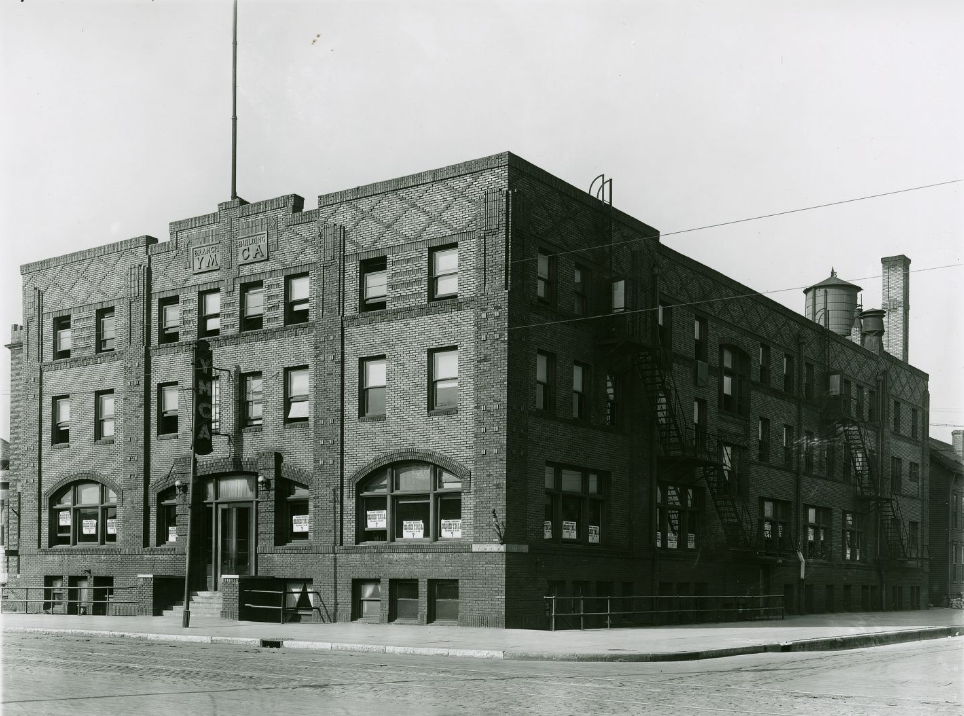
- Senate Avenue YMCA, in 1919
- Formation: 1912
- Dissolved: 2002
- Headquarters: Indianapolis, Indiana, US
- Coordinates: 39°46′26″N 86°9′49″W
- Key people: Faburn DeFrantz; Madam C.J. Walker; Jesse E. Moorland; Booker T. Washington
- Parent organization: YMCA

The Senate Avenue YMCA, established in 1912 in Indianapolis, Indiana, had more members than any other African American YMCA in the United States for half a century. During World War II, the organization included more than 3,000 members.

== History ==
At the invitation of leaders of the Indianapolis YMCA, Jesse E. Moorland visited the city in the early 1900s and recommended the establishment of a new branch of the YMCA for the city's Black population. At the same time, in 1900, two doctors from Ninth Presbyterian Church, Henry L. Hummons and Dan H. Brown, created a Young Men's Prayer Band. Brown would go on to be a founder of St. Philip's Episcopal Church in the same period. The Young Men's Prayer Band began with seventeen members. Two years later the YMCA in Indiana recognized the organization. In 1910 the group was also established as an official branch of the African American YMCA. In 1912, the organization included more than 500 members. By the 1940s, the membership grew to over 3,000 people. Until the middle of the 20th century, the branch's membership was larger than any other African American YMCA.

In 1904 the organization launched a lecture series entitled "Monster Meetings". The widely attended events included public lectures from well-known African Americans and other public figures. Speakers at these meetings included Alain Locke, Countee Cullen, George S. Schuyler, Herman B Wells, Jesse Owens, Langston Hughes, W. E. B. Du Bois, George Washington Carver, Martin Luther King, Jr., Thurgood Marshall, Adam Clayton Powell, Paul Robeson, Jackie Robinson, and Eleanor Roosevelt.

During the early years the organization met in homes, churches, and in the Flanner House. In 1910 the organization responded to a fund raising effort sponsored by Julius Rosenwald, who headed Sears, Roebuck & Company. Rosenwald promised to give $25,000 to any Black YMCA that could raise $75,000. The Indianapolis community matched this mark by raising $100,000 in ten days in October 1911. Madam C.J. Walker donated $1,000.00 for the building.

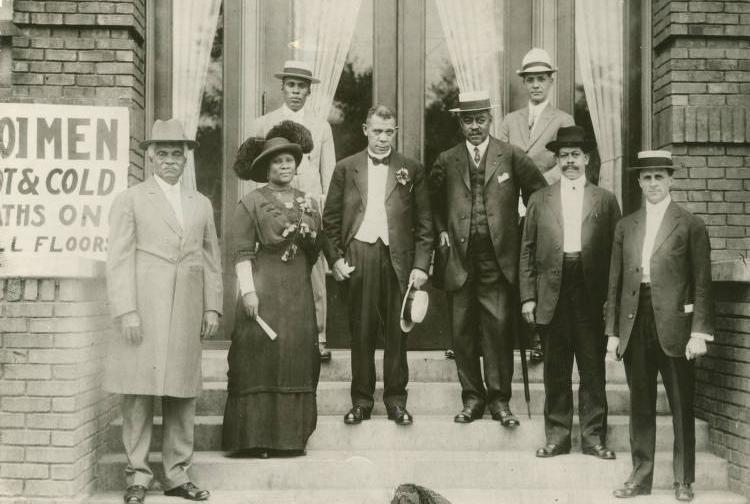
Dedication ceremony photograph, 1913

More than 5,000 people attended the groundbreaking on July 28, 1912, at the corner of Michigan Street and Indiana Avenue. Construction began later that year in October. A week before the dedication, the community held a week of events to celebrate the new building. The building was dedicated in 1913 and the dedication was attended by Madam C.J. Walker, Booker T. Washington, and other prominent community leaders.

The Senate Avenue YMCA was led by Faburn DeFrantz from 1916 to 1952. Under DeFrantz's leadership, the organization maintained a focus on political education, civic involvement, and desegregation. Under his leadership the Monster Meetings, held on Sundays, shifted their focus from religious topics to social and political issues. He also prioritized holding events and actions that focused on desegregation within Indiana.

The Senate Avenue YMCA was located near an African American neighborhood of more than 30,000 people. However, the YMCA organization desegregated in 1946, in the United States. As a result, the Senate Avenue YMCA was dissolved in 1959 and moved to a new building to serve an integrated membership, the Fall Creek YMCA. Although the Fall Creek YMCA was an integrated branch, most of the members were Black. Near the end of the 20th century, the Fall Creek YMCA struggled to maintain membership. With news reports citing the creation of interstate highways and the IUPUI university campus (both of which demolished much of the local Black neighborhood), the branch closed in 2002.

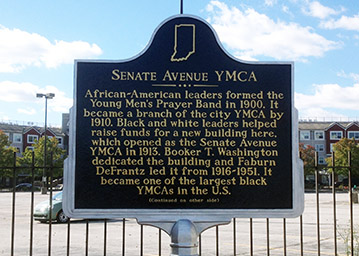
Senate Avenue YMCA historical marker

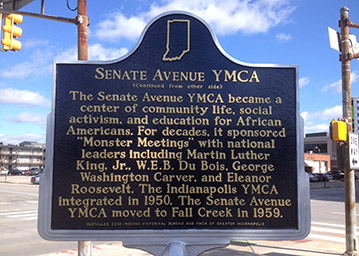
Senate Avenue YMCA historical marker's back

== Legacy ==
The role of the Senate Avenue YMCA and its importance to the Indianapolis community was commemorated with the placement of a historic marker in 2016, installed near where the building once stood at 420 N. Senate Avenue. Although the location no longer exists, the YMCA of Greater Indianapolis relaunched the "Monster Meeting" lecture series and continues to invite speakers to address topics related to racial reconciliation. In 2022, the guest speaker was Ilyasah Shabazz.
