= Harriette Bailey Conn =

American politician

Member of the Indiana House of Representatives from the Marion County district
- In office November 9, 1966 – March 24, 1970

Personal details
- Born: September 22, 1922 Indianapolis, Indiana, U.S.
- Died: August 21, 1981 (aged 58)
- Party: Republican
- Spouse: Clifton F. Conn Sr.
- Education: Talladega College; Indiana University (JD)

Harriette Bailey Conn (September 22, 1922 – August 21, 1981) was an American lawyer and politician. A civil rights activist who became known for her efforts to assist minorities, women, and defendants in Indiana's criminal justice system, Conn became the first woman and the first African American to serve as Indiana's state public defender in 1970. She also served as Indianapolis' assistant city attorney from 1968 to 1970, and twice won election to the Indiana House of Representatives (representing Marion County, Indiana, Indianapolis) as a Republican until she resigned her legislative seat to become the state public defender.

== Education and family ==
Harriette Vesta Bailey was born in Indianapolis, on September 22, 1922. She was the second child of Nelle Vesta (Hayes) and Robert Lieutenant Bailey. Her father served as an Indiana deputy attorney general from 1930 to 1932 and was a prominent civil rights lawyer in the state and involved in the early efforts of the National Association for the Advancement of Colored People.

Bailey attended Indianapolis Public Schools and graduated from Crispus Attucks High School (then the only high school serving the African American community) in 1937 at the age of fourteen. She then enrolled at Talladega College in Alabama, where she majored in English and speech. Before graduating in 1941, Bailey became a member of Delta Sigma Theta sorority and the first woman president of the school's Little Theater.

Bailey returned to Indianapolis after graduation and married Clifton F. Conn Sr. While raising a family of seven children (two daughters and five sons), she enrolled in law school, graduating from the Indiana University Robert H. McKinney School of Law in 1955. The Conns divorced in 1961.

Although Bailey attended Bethel A.M.E. Church with her family, as an adult she joined a Unitarian congregation.

== Career ==
Conn was admitted to the Indiana Bar in 1955. Her early career included a year (1955–56) as a deputy attorney general in Indiana. There she worked with or represented state units including the Indiana Civil Rights Commission, the Indiana State Teachers' Retirement Fund, and the Indiana Public Employees Retirement Fund. In addition, Conn briefly worked for the Indiana State Highway Department.

In February 1965, Conn joined Marie T. Lauck and Jane Hunt Davis to form a private law practice in Indianapolis. Later that year Conn began serving as a Marion County, Indiana, deputy prosecuting attorney in the Nineteenth Judicial Circuit. Because state laws prohibited a state employee from serving as a state legislator, Conn had to resign from her position as deputy prosecuting attorney after winning election to the state House of Representatives in 1966.

=== State legislator ===
A Republican, Conn twice won elections as state representative from Marion County (in the multi-member 26th district) to the Indiana General Assembly. Republicans swept Indianapolis' fifteen seats from Democratic control in 1966, and Conn won re-election in 1968. During the 95th and 96th sessions of the state legislature, Conn became chairperson of the Indiana Welfare and Social Security Committee, as well as a member of the state's Constitutional Revision Commission and the Judiciary Committee. Conn introduced a bill advocating abortion reform, which passed the Indiana House of Representatives and a modified version passed the Indiana Senate, but Indiana governor Roger D. Branigin vetoed the legislation. Conn also introduced a bill that expanded women's property rights that became law in 1967 and sponsored bills related to civil rights, aid to dependent children, and private slum clearance.

=== Civic attorney and public defender ===
In 1968, while still serving as a state representative, Conn became an assistant city attorney for Indianapolis under Richard Lugar's mayoral administration and remained in that position until 1970. As an assistant city attorney, Conn served as legal council to the Indianapolis City-County Council and an advisor to the Indianapolis Human Rights Commission. She later served as chairman of the Indiana Advisory Committee to the U.S. Commission on Civil Rights.

Effective May 1, 1970, Conn was appointed as a public defender for the State of Indiana, becoming the first woman and first African American to hold the position. The public defender's office provided legal services to Indiana inmates who were unable to afford private legal council to appeal their convictions and sentences. As a result of the appointment, Conn was admitted to the Bar of the Supreme Court of the United States. Conn also made a bid for Marion County municipal court judge in 1974, but she was defeated in the primary and remained a public defender until her death in 1981. In addition to her duties as a public defender, Conn served as the office's chief administrative officer at a time when the office's heavy caseload caused the staff to increase from three in 1970 to twenty-seven in 1981.

=== Community leader ===
Conn was a leader in civic affairs, which included membership in numerous professional and political organizations such as the American Bar Association, National Association for the Advancement of Colored People, Marion County Bar Association, and Indianapolis Bar Association, where she was among its first black members. Conn was also a member of the Republican National Committee, Indiana Women Lawyers Association, the Indianapolis Lawyers Commission, Indianapolis Urban League and Indianapolis Women's Political Caucus, among others.

In addition, Conn was involved in civil rights groups, including a life member of the NAACP and chairperson of the U.S. Commission on Civil Rights and the Indiana State Advisory Committee to the U.S. Commission on Civil Rights, as well as the Indianapolis Urban League, Citizens Forum, and the Indianapolis Senior Citizens Center, among other civic organizations. Conn also remained active in the Talladega College Alumni Association, as a member of the advisory board at Vincennes University, and the Chi chapter of Delta Sigma Theta in Indianapolis, where she served as its president in 1963.

== Death and legacy ==
Conn died unexpectedly of a heart attack on August 21, 1981, at the age of fifty-eight. The Indiana Senate adopted a resolution memorializing her service and President Ronald Reagan signed a condolence note sent to Bailey's daughter, Matinel Brandon Conn. She is buried at Crown Hill Cemetery in Indianapolis. Bailey's son, J. Sidney Conn, donated her papers to the Indiana Historical Society in Indianapolis. In 2021, the Indiana Historical Bureau installed a historical marker in her honor.

== Honors and awards ==
- Inducted into Crispus Attucks High School Hall of Fame in 1970
- Awarded an honorary Doctor of Civil Law degree from Franklin College in 1971
- Named a Sagamore of the Wabash in 1962 and in 1979
