= Cleo W. Blackburn =

American educator (1909–1978)

Cleo Walter Blackburn
- Born: September 27, 1909; Port Gibson, Mississippi
- Died: June 1, 1978 (aged 68); Indianapolis, Indiana
- Resting place: Crown Hill National Cemetery, Indianapolis, Indiana, Section 75, Lot 8; 39.8190311°N 86.1706112°W
- Education: Butler University; Fisk University; Indiana University; Wharton School
- Occupation: Educator

Cleo Walter Blackburn (September 27, 1909 - June 1, 1978) was an American educator. He was the founder and CEO for The Fundamental Board of Education and a member of the fraternity Kappa Alpha Psi, the National Association for the Advancement of Colored People (NAACP) and the Indianapolis Urban League. He received a fellowship from the Rosenwald Foundation.

== Early life and education ==
Blackburn was the grandson of a former slave, born September 27, 1909, in Port Gibson, Mississippi. He went to Indianapolis, Indiana, in 1928 from the family farm with $7.19 in his pocket.

Blackburn earned a bachelor's degree from the Butler University School of Religion in Indianapolis, Indiana, and a master's degree from Fisk University of Nashville, Tennessee. Blackburn also studied for a year at the Pendle Hill Quaker Center for Study and Contemplation in Philadelphia, and was a Rosenwald Fellow at Indiana University. He served as the head of the Department of Sociology and Economics at Knoxville College in Tennessee, and as the head of the Department of Records and Research at Tuskegee Institute, now known as Tuskegee University. Then in 1935, while still working for the institute, Blackburn was offered the position of Superintendent of the Indianapolis social service agency, Flanner House. Blackburn was the director of Flanner House from 1936 until his retirement in 1975. During his time there, he was also the president of Jarvis Christian College for a span of eleven years.

== Career ==
Blackburn was involved in many clubs and organizations. He was the founder and CEO for The Fundamental Board of Education. Blackburn was an ordained minister with The Christian Church (Disciples of Christ), and also served as pastor of the Lea Avenue Christian Church for nine months. He was a member of the predominantly African American fraternity Kappa Alpha Psi, the National Association for the Advancement of Colored People (NAACP), the Indianapolis Urban League, and was a 33rd Degree Mason. Blackburn held Honorary Doctorate Degrees from Northwest Christian College (now Northwest Christian University), Drake University, Indiana Central College (now University of Indianapolis), and Butler University.

Blackburn died June 1, 1978, in Indianapolis, IN. He suffered a heart attack while backing out of the driveway of a friend's residence. By the time of his death, Blackburn was credited with practically single-handedly molding Flanner House into a nationally recognized inner-city help project.

=== Contributions to Flanner House ===
Flanner Guild was formed in 1898 by the contributions of philanthropist Frank Flanner. Flanner donated two frame buildings to the Charity Organization Society with instructions to create a "Negro" community service center. In 1903 the organization was incorporated. This organization's goal were the promotion of the social and physical welfare of Negroes, more particularly the young, and the establishment and maintenance of industry and other means of education. In 1912 the Flanner Guild changed its name to Flanner House. A new phase of Flanner House development began in 1936 with the arrival of Cleo W. Blackburn to Flanner House as superintendent. On March 11, 1936 Blackburn reorganized Flanner House to include programs in five divisions: vocational aids, social services, health, housing, and self-help. Blackburn brought the skills, energy and vision necessary to build soundly on the achievements of his predecessors. By 1944, Blackburn had gained enough resources to build a new headquarters. Flanner House trained more than 1,500 African Americans for jobs in defense plants and other industries during World War II. They placed 12,000 people annually in jobs for the first decade after the war. In 1949 a shop building and cannery were added to Flanner House.

Under Blackburn's leadership, Flanner House began offering health examinations. Flanner House built the Herman G. Morgan Health Center in conjunction with the Marion County Health and Hospital Corporation. From 1947 to 1952, nearly 5,000 people received free examinations and health service there. Almost 44,000 people received medical care at the center in 1968. That same year, Flanner House opened up the Martindale Health center for low-income families.

=== The Board for Fundamental Education ===
In 1948, Blackburn founded the Board for Fundamental Education (BFE). The primary goal of the organization was to teach individuals the necessary skills to perform a job and to match them with job openings. The Board for Fundamental Education focused on applying the power of the education process to community needs and resources to help people live more useful, productive, and satisfying lives. The BFE had six main objectives.

- To strengthen the programs of existing demonstration centers in fundamental education.
- The addition of new demonstration centers.
- The development of definite relationships with associate and affiliate universities, orientation and involvement of staff.
- Training leaders at demonstration centers, as well as community leaders and other cooperating organizations and agencies working at the community level.
- The beginning of the development of teaching and instructional materials in fundamental education.
- Adopt a five-year budget to raise $860,000.00.

In 1954 BFE was the only African American organization founded by an African American to be granted a national charter by U.S. Congress. The charter allowed BFE to operate in every state, and from 1954 to 1967 it had 29 affiliates in as many states. The Board for Fundamental Education made agreements with many colleges and universities to set up BFE, and thus partnered with colleges such as Northland College, Jarvis Christian College, Purdue University, and Indiana University to strengthen programs in fundamental education. Blackburn served as the executive director of BFE from 1948 to 1969, then he became the president and CEO.

The Board for Fundamental Education and Flanner House worked together on programs throughout the African American community. They developed projects that helped with education, housing, community development, health, social services and better jobs. BFE and Flanner House had a housing program called the "sweat equity plan" that taught building skills to prospective homeowners who would help to construct their own homes.

== Personal life ==
Cleo Walter Blackburn married Fannie Elizabeth Scott Blackburn. Blackburn and his wife had three children together: a son Walter Scott Blackburn; and two daughters, one by the name of Sara Blackburn Kimbrough and one named Harriet Virginia Blackburn Reynolds. He and his family lived on the second floor of Flanner House, when it was located at St. Clair and West Streets. Their son, Walter Scott Blackburn became an architect in Indianapolis, where he and his wife Alpha were both owners and CEOs of Blackburn Associates Architects, Inc.

Blackburn later married Dora Oma Atkins Blackburn, who was the owner of Atkins Flower Shop. Blackburn had no children with his second wife. Mrs. Blackburn was a graduate from Butler University and was a member of the predominantly African American sorority Alpha Kappa Alpha.
