= Indiana Public Retirement System =

Pension fund for public employees in Indiana

- Industry: Pension fund
- Founded: 2011
- Headquarters: Indianapolis, Indiana, U.S.
- Key people: Steve Russo
- Website: www.in.gov/inprs

Indiana Public Retirement System (INPRS) is a U.S.-based pension fund responsible for the pension assets for public employees in the state of Indiana. INPRS is among the largest 100 pension funds in the United States, with $47.961 billion in actuarial accrued liabilities and $34.479 billion in actuarial assets as of June 30, 2021. The fund administers and manages several pension funds in the State of Indiana, the two largest of which are the Indiana State Teachers' Retirement Fund and the Indiana Public Employees' Retirement Fund. The others are the 1977 Police Officers' and Firefighters' Retirement Fund; the Judges' Retirement System; the Excise, Gaming, and Conservation Officers' Retirement Fund; the Prosecuting Attorneys' Retirement Fund; the Legislators' Defined Benefit Fund; and the Legislators' Defined Contribution Fund. Each of the current funds remains separate but all are administered by the nine-member board of trustees of INPRS.

INPRS covers 507,957 members consisting of 214,882 active employees, 163,663 benefit recipients, and 129,412 inactive members. In fiscal year 2021, its various funds paid out approximately $3.4 billion in annual benefits and received $3.2 billion in annual employer and employee contributions as well as income from its investment portfolio. The portfolio totaled $45.8 billion of assets under management as of June 30, 2021. Overall, INPRS has an approximately 89.0 percent funded actuarial value as of June 30, 2021, excluding a pay-as-you-go plan relating to the Indiana Teachers' Retirement Fund.

INPRS also oversees three non-retirement funds: the Pension Relief Fund, the Public Safety Officers’ Special Death Benefit Fund, and the State Employees’ Death Benefit Fund.
