= Faburn DeFrantz =

Senate Avenue YMCA Executive Secretary

- Born: February 9, 1885; Topeka, Kansas
- Died: September 24, 1964 (aged 79); Indianapolis, Indiana
- Resting place: Crown Hill Cemetery and Arboretum, Section 98, Lot 1001; 39.8137058°N 86.1714246°W
- Education: Kansas Medical College, Indiana University School of Social Work
- Organization: Senate Avenue YMCA
- Spouse: Myrtle Summers
- Children: Faburn Jr. and Robert DeFrantz
- Parent(s): Samella and Alonzo DeFrantz

Faburn DeFrantz (February 9, 1885 – September 24, 1964) was an executive secretary of the Senate Avenue YMCA from 1916 to 1951. He is noted to have been a staunch advocate for desegregation.

== Life ==
Faburn DeFrantz was born to Samella and Alonzo DeFrantz as the seventh child out of thirteen, according to his memoir. Born in Topeka, Kansas, DeFrantz later went on to study at the Kansas Medical College, then at the Indiana University School of Social Work. He and his wife, Myrtle Summers, had two children: Faburn DeFrantz Jr. and Robert David DeFrantz. He also had grandchildren named Kathy and David.

In his memoir, Faburn recalls that when he was a child, he had often snuck into his local, segregated YMCA in Topeka where the other white boys played basketball with him. However, one day, he was thrown out after being caught by a staff member. From this experience, he says in his memoir, DeFrantz wanted to lead his own YMCA where "nobody would yell at a boy or knock him around— no matter his color or race."

== Influence ==
DeFrantz arrived at Indianapolis in 1913 and became the executive secretary of the Senate Avenue YMCA in 1916. He helped develop the Monster Meetings (Indianapolis), which was a lecture series that took place in Indianapolis that featured prominent African American leaders who spoke on relevant social and political issues.

Monster Meetings hosted a wide range of audiences of different races, including Black men and white men, and even Black women and white women. The Citizen's Committee of One Hundred, which arose from Monster Meetings, focused on reporting about the status of key African American issues such as desegregation. DeFrantz's role in these committees served to bolster community engagement within local politics.

He emphasized the need for African Americans to participate in social and political circles. Through his leadership, many organizations in Indiana moved towards desegregation. He helped worked on anti-hate and anti-segregation bills in Indiana. In 1949, he helped write the Anti-Hate bill which directly contributed to desegregations of public schools of Indiana. He is noted to have been a key figure in the desegregation of Indiana University as well as various other Indiana-based organizations and associations.

He was also a trustee in the Flanner House, Howard University, and Madam C. J. Walker Company. In 1952, DeFrantz retired from his position as the executive secretary of the Senate Avenue YMCA.

== Death ==
Faburn DeFrantz died in September 1964 in Indianapolis, Indiana.
