= Daisy Riley Lloyd =

American politician (1928–2019)

Representative Daisy Riley Lloyd

Member of the Indiana House of Representatives from the Marion County district
- In office November 4, 1964 – November 9, 1966

Personal details
- Born: October 15, 1928 Lawrence, Kansas
- Died: May 15, 2019 (aged 90) Indianapolis, Indiana
- Party: Democratic
- Education: Howard University (Bachelor's degree, 1950); Butler University (M.A. in Psychology and Religions, 1979); Purdue University (PhD in Human Development and Family Studies, 1985); United Theological Seminary (D. Min., 2002)

Daisy Riley Lloyd (October 15, 1923 – May 15, 2019) was the first female African American to serve in the Indiana legislature. She was one of fifteen Democrats who represented Marion County (Indianapolis) in the Indiana House of Representatives during the 94th Indiana General Assembly. She later became a realtor and family counselor and continued to be active in her community.

== Early life and education ==
Born Daisy Riley in Lawrence, Kansas and raised on a farm. She was educated in the local public schools and graduated from Highland Park High School in 1946. In Washington, D.C., she studied economics and sociology and earned a bachelor's degree from Howard University in 1950, supporting her studies by working as a research assistant in the Library of Congress. She also met fellow student Frank Perry Lloyd of South Carolina, whom she married in 1950.

The couple moved to Germany the following year, after the U.S. Army assigned her husband, an obstetrician-gynecologist, there in 1951. The Lloyd family moved to Indianapolis in 1953. Daisy Lloyd became a homemaker, raising four children and becoming active in her local Roman Catholic church, although she and Dr. Lloyd ultimately divorced. After her political career discussed below, Lloyd earned counseling M.A. degrees from Butler University and the Christian Theological Seminary in 1979, and later a PhD. in marriage and family counseling from Purdue University.

== Political career ==
While a homemaker, Lloyd became active politically, later recalling protesting segregation at the Indiana State Fairgrounds. She became active in the National Association for the Advancement of Colored People, the League of Women Voters and the LINKS Indianapolis' chapter.

As a Democrat, Lloyd won election to the Indiana House of Representatives in 1964, becoming one of fifteen Democrats elected to represent Indianapolis and surrounding Marion County. Lloyd became the first African American woman to serve in the Indiana House of Representativevs; the winning Democratic slate also included Katherine O'Connell Fruits (1907–1994) and Cecilia M. Logan (1921–1976). All three Democratic women legislators served only a single term, since Indiana adopted numbered legislative districts for the next election, which proved to be a Republican landslide. During her legislative service, Lloyd was diagnosed with breast cancer and became one of the first women to discuss her diagnosis and treatment publicly. Republican (and former state public defender) Harriette Bailey Conn, was elected in that election, and became the only African American woman in the 95th Indiana General Assembly.

== Career ==
Lloyd realized her community was poorly served by realtors, so after her term finished, she studied and received a realtor's license. She worked with a firm owned by W.T. Ray, before starting her own business as president of Northside Realty. Inc. Lloyd became active in the National Board of Realtors, the Certified Property Managers Association and the Indianapolis Business Development Corporation. Lloyd also served as a Commissioner of the Indianapolis Public Housing Authority and as a member of the Commission for Higher Education after her legislative service. She also helped found the Butler Tarkington Neighborhood Association and the Center for Leadership Development.

After receiving counseling degrees from Butler University in 1979 (M.A. in Psychology and Religions) and Purdue University in 1985 (PhD in Human Development and Family Studies), Lloyd continued to assist individual clients as well as led retreats. She also received a D. Min. from United Theological Seminary in Dayton, Ohio in 2002. Lloyd also served on the state and national councils of family relations, and became a director of the Alpha Home, Inc. (serving senior citizens) and a member of the Chancellor's Advisory Council of Indiana University-Purdue University Indianapolis. Lloyd was also active in the American Civil Liberties Union, Links, Indianapolis Arts Council; Catholic Charities, Inc.; Community Service Council; Indianapolis Symphony Society; American Cancer Society; The Northeasterners and the Book Lovers Club, among many other activities.
