= Hildegarde Flanner =

American poet

June Hildegarde Flanner (June 3, 1899 – May 27, 1987) was an American poet, essayist, playwright and conservationist.

== Early years ==
June Hildegarde Flanner was born in Indianapolis, Indiana, to Frank Flanner and Mary Ellen Hockett. She had two older sisters, noted journalist Janet Flanner and Marie Flanner, a musician and composer. Frank Flanner was Indiana's first licensed embalmer and in 1881 he founded a company that is still in business as Flanner and Buchanan Funeral Centers. In 1898, Frank Flanner founded the Flanner Guild, a not-for-profit community service center for African-Americans in Indianapolis, now called Flanner House.

== Later life ==
Hildegarde Flanner attended Sweet Briar College in Virginia before moving to California in 1919 to attend the University of California, Berkeley. At the university, she studied poetry with Witter Bynner and was on the literary staff of The Occident. Flanner was honored with the Emily Chamberlain Cook Prize in 1920 for her poem Young Girl.

Along with her mother, Flanner lost her home and most of her possessions in the Berkeley Fire of 1923, prompting them to move to southern California. On June 29, 1926, Flanner married architect and artist Frederick Monhoff and lived in Altadena with their child, John, born in 1941.

Hildegarde Flanner continued to write under her maiden name, chronicling events in her life as well as the changing landscape of California in the twentieth century. Flanner's contributions were published in The Nation, The New Republic and Poetry. She was named the New Directions Poet of the Month in 1942. One of their neighbors in Altadena was Danish illustrator Kay Nielsen and in 1977 Flanner's elegy on Nielsen was included in The Unknown Paintings of Kay Nielsen.

Flanner and Monhoff spent their later years on their property in Calistoga, Napa Valley, California. Flanner was an avid gardener, with particular interests in ornamental grasses and bamboo. It was thought that Flanner had the largest collection of bamboo varieties in California.

== Bibliography ==
=== Poetry ===
- Young Girl and Other Poems (1920)
- This Morning (1921)
- A Tree in Bloom and Other Verses (1924)
- Time's Profile (1929)
- Valley Quail (1929)
- If There Is Time (The Poet Of The Month Series) (1942)
- In Native Light (1970)
- The Hearkening Eye (Modern and Contemporary Poetry of the West) (1979)
- X (1983)
- At the Gentle Mercy of Plants: Essays and Poems (1986)

=== Plays ===
- Mansions (1920)
- The White Bridge (1938)

=== Essays ===
- A Vanishing Land (1980)
- Brief Cherishing: A Napa Valley Harvest (1985)
- Different Images: Portraits of Remembered People (1987)
