= Monster Meetings =

Lecture series in Indianapolis, Indiana

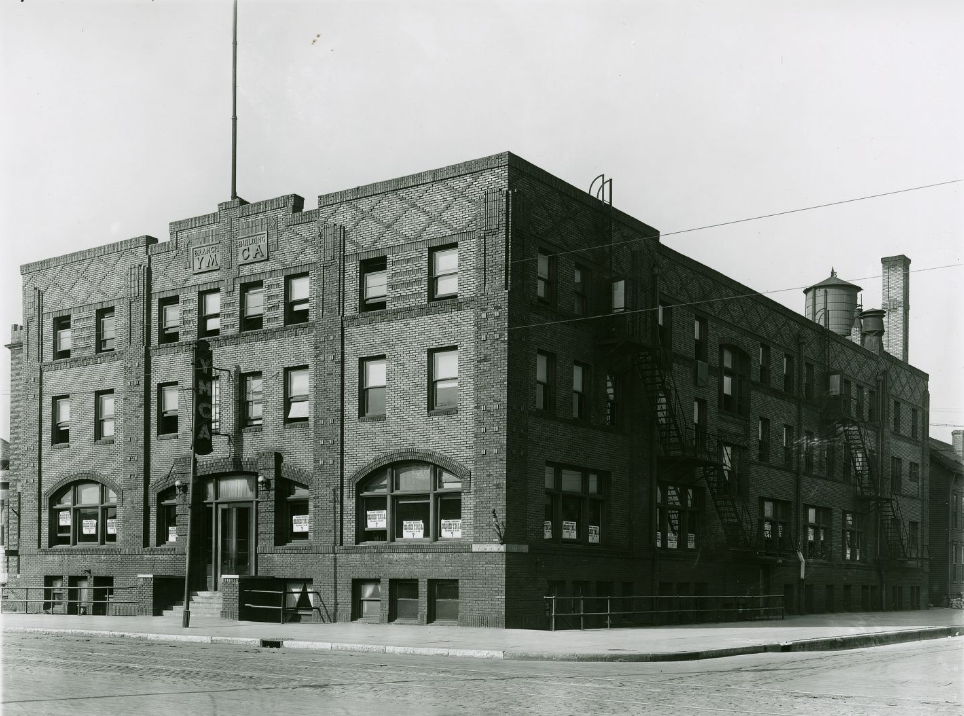
- Senate Avenue YMCA

General information
- Location: Senate Avenue YMCA, Bethel A.M.E. Church (Indianapolis, Indiana), Walker Theatere, Indianapolis, United States

Monster Meetings were a lecture series based in the Senate Avenue YMCA in Indianapolis, Indiana, where influential people from across the United States spoke about social and political issues.

== History ==
Monster Meetings were originally called "Big Meetings", but as the statewide YMCA meetings were also called that, the Senate YMCA was prevented from using that title. Instead, Thomas E. Taylor changed the name to "Monster Meetings." Originally, the meetings focused on religious issues, hosting local ministers. After Faburn DeFrantz took on a leadership position in the Senate Avenue YMCA, they involved political and social issue speakers from across the United States. These meetings started in 1905.

Monster Meetings, which took place November–March on Sundays, was highly popular in downtown Indianapolis according to the Indianapolis Recorder. Thomas E. Taylor was an influential figure in putting together the meetings. While the meetings primarily featured men and hosted male speakers, women were invited by 1906 to participate. Some of the speakers were key women leaders, like Merze Tate. Other such women speakers included Eleanor Roosevelt and Irene McCoy Gaines.

The meetings featured speakers such as W. E. B. Du Bois, Booker T. Washington, George Washington Carver, Mordecai Wyatt Johnson, Eleanor Roosevelt, and many other important national figures. While it was based in the Senate Avenue YMCA, the meetings also took place in Bethel A.M.E. Church, Walker Theatre, and the Second Baptist Church. According to the Indiana Historical Bureau, the speakers coincided with major events in history such as when Freeman Ransom gave a talk in the 1930s during the Great Depression about unemployment.

There were also white speakers that participated in the Monster Meetings such as Indiana politicians. In 1927, they created a Monster Meetings group for children.

Monster Meetings also had associated committees such as Citizen's Committee of One Hundred and its subcommittees that focused on enacting change within Indiana policy to counter harmful policies that affect the Black community. The meetings also participated in putting together the Anti-Segregation Bill for Indiana.

In 1947–1952, DeFrantz instituted an Emblem Club Racial Amity which awarded white individuals who contributed greatly to the Black community.

In 1959, the Senate Avenue YMCA moved to Fall Creek and in 2002, the Fall Creek YMCA was closed down. In 2022, Indianapolis community members stated they wanted to reignite Monster Meetings and invited Ilyasah Shabazz.

== Speakers ==
Below is an incomplete list of notable Monster Meeting speakers as recorded by Warren Stanley.

Notable speakers of the Monster Meetings
Speaker	Event title and date
Mordecai Wyatt Johnson	"Religion or Christianity" in November 1926; Unnamed Event in November 1927; "Anti-Semitism and the Negro Ministry" in November 1938; "Our Work, Our Wages, Our Soul" in November 1939; "Civilization's Civil War" in November 1941; "Freedom's Challenge" in November 1943; "Implications of the Atomic Bomb" in November 1945; "Civilization's Civil War: Part II" in November 1946; "Ghandi and the Liberation of India" in November 1950; "The Foundations of Freedom" in November 1951; "Our Historic Opportunity" in November 1953; "A Troubled World in the Middle East" in November 1955; Unnamed Event in November 1956, 1957, 1960, 1961
Alain L. Locke	Unnamed Event in November 1926; "Shall We Live in the World or a Ghetto?" in November 1927; "Some Recent Gains in Race Relations" in February 1928; "What About the Future" in December 1928; "Which Way Out: Economic, Political, or Cultural?" in November 1929
Max Yergan	Unnamed Event in December 1926; "Democracy: A Goal to Defend" in December 1940; "Things That Men Live By" in November 1953
Countee Cullen	Unnamed Event in February 1927
Ralph Metcalfe	Unnamed Event in November 1927
John Hope	"Some Recent Gains along the Color Line" in December 1927
George Washington Cable	"Egypt" in December 1927; "John Brown" in December 1928
George Schuyler	"The Negro's Next Step" in January 1928; "What's to Become of the Negro?" in January 1930; "New Frontiers for Negro Youth" in March 1935; Unnamed Event in January 1954
Lemuel Ertus Slack	"Good Citizenship" in January 1928; "Public Maturity" in January 1929
Chandler Owen	"A Negro in Congress Now" in January 1928
Freeman B. Ransom	"The Y.M.C.A. and the Church" in March 1928; "Watchman, What of the Night?" in February 1929; "Unemployment and How to Solve it" in March 1930
Walter White	"The Color Question As a World Problem" in November 1928; Unnamed Event in November 1934; "Issues of the Day" in February 1948; "Integrated Society or a Segregated Society" in February 1951
Howard Thurman	Unnamed Event in November 1928
Garfield Thomas Haywood	"Out of Egypt" in January 1929; "The Message of Christ" in December 1930
William Pickens	"Economic Interpretations of the Race Problems" in March 1929; "Fredrick Douglass: The Spirit of Freedom" in February 1931
Harry G. Leslie	"The Responsibilities of Citizenship" in March 1929
Channing Heggie Tobias	"Give the Boys a Chance" in March 1929; "The Church and the World Crisis" in January 1942; "This is the Hour" in December 1947; Unnamed Event in January 1943
Elmer George Homrighausen	"The Meaning of Jesus for Today's Problems" in March 1930
Arthur R. Robinson	"Citizen and the Constitution" in November 1930
Louis George Gregory	"How to Remove Prejudice" in December 1930
Rufus Clement	"Finding a Way Out" in November 1931; Unnamed Event in December 1962
James M. Ogden	"Vice and Crime: Its Cause and Crime" in November 1931
Paul V. McNutt	"Americanism" in January 1932
George Washington Carver	"Great Creator, What Is a Peanut, Why Did You Make It?" in February 1932
W. E. B. Du Bois	"Segregation" in March 1934; "The American Plight of the American Negro" in March 1934
Henry J. Richardson Jr.	"The New Negro and New Politics" in March 1935
Percy Lavon Julian	"The Negro Scholarship and the Present Crisis" in January 1936; Unnamed Event in November 1939; "A Challenge to American Negro Statesmanship" in November 1945; "Modern Science and American Faith" in November 1947; "Science and the World Order" in November 1949; Unnamed Event in February 1955
Lester Granger	Unnamed Event in February 1936; "A Time for Greatness" in February 1960
Merze Tate	"International Relations" in March 1936; "Education and International Good Will" in February 1952
Charles S. Johnson	"The Changing Economical Status of the Negro" in March 1931; "A Sociological Philosophy for Action" in December 1937; Unnamed Event in December 1956
Herman B Wells	"Education in a Democracy" in December 1939
Lorenzo J. Greene	"The Negro Sharecropper of Southeast Missouri" in February 1940; "The Negro in National Defense" in February 1942
Max Yergan	Unnamed Event in December 1926; "Democracy: A Goal to Defend" in December 1940; "Things That Men Live By" in November 1953
Earl B. Dickerson	"Democracy for the Negro through Political Action" in January 1941
A. Philip Randolph	"A Program for Negro People Today" in February 1943; "The Negro in War and Peace" in February 1944; "The World Struggle for Democracy" in January 1947; Unnamed Event in February 1951; "The Civil Rights Crisis and American Democracy" in November 1955; "The Civil Rights Resolution in America" in November 1956; Unnamed Event in March 1962
Henry F. Schricker	"Looking Ahead" in December 1944; Unnamed Event in December 1950
Eugene C. Pulliam	"The New Terror in Europe" in December 1947
Philip Willkie	"The American Struggle" in November 1951
Archie Alexander	"Straw for the Bricks of America" in January 1952
Eleanor Roosevelt	"International Human Rights" in December 1953
Irene McCoy Gaines	"Human Relations on Your Street" in January 1955
Arrington High	"The Role of the Negro Press in an Integrated Society or a Segregated Society" in January 1959

Langston Hughes is also a notable speaker.
