= Kay Nielsen =

Danish illustrator (1886–1957)

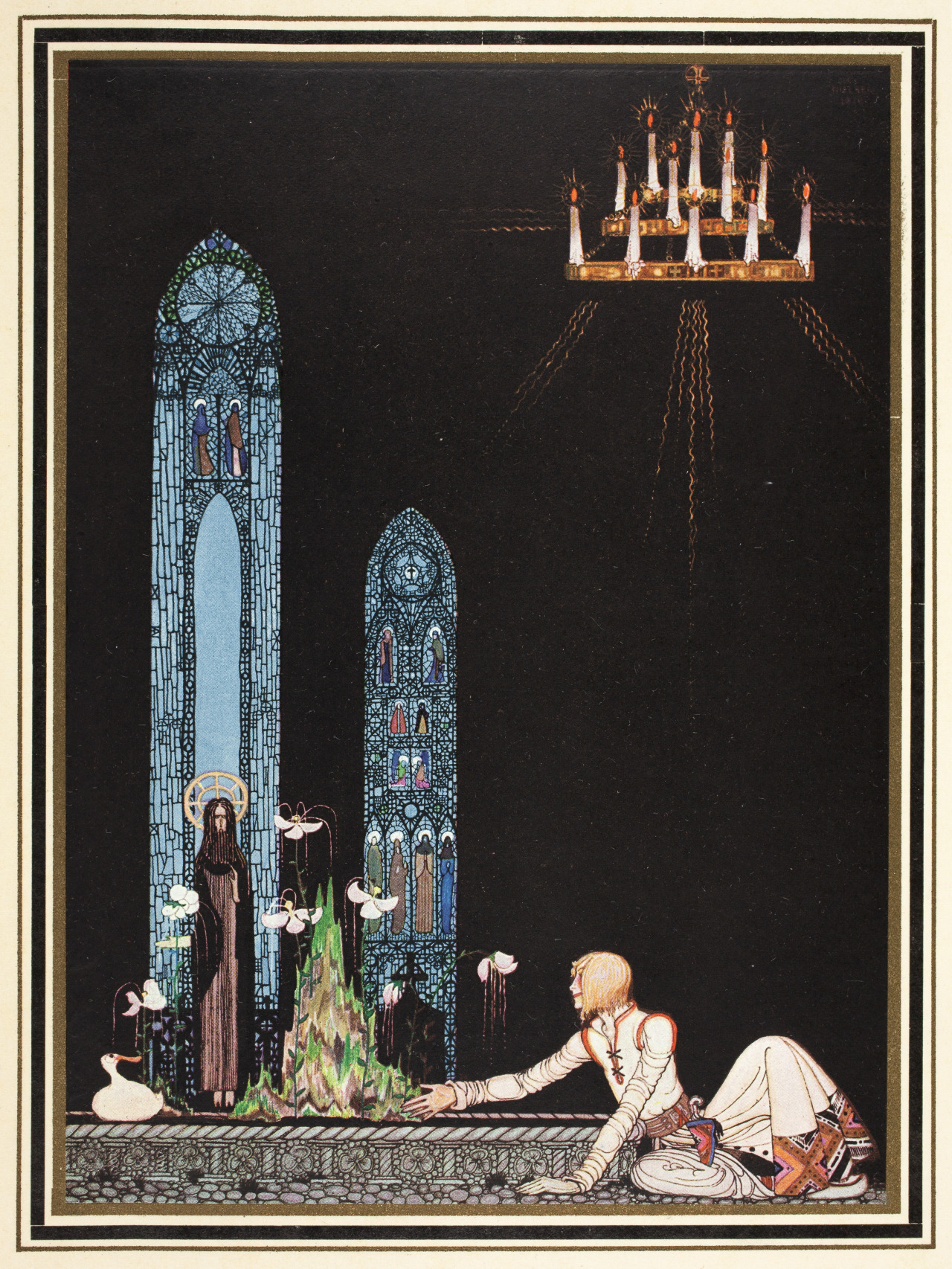
- Nielsen illustration, 1914
- Born: Kay Rasmus Nielsen; March 12, 1886; Copenhagen, Denmark
- Died: June 21, 1957 (aged 71); Los Angeles, California
- Known for: Illustrator
- Notable work: East of the Sun and West of the Moon
- Movement: Art Nouveau
- Spouse: Ulla Pless-Schmidt (1926-death)

Kay Rasmus Nielsen (March 12, 1886 – June 21, 1957) was a Danish illustrator who was popular in the early 20th century, the Golden Age of Illustration which lasted from when Daniel Vierge and other pioneers developed printing technology to the point that drawings and paintings could be reproduced with reasonable facility. Nielsen is also known for his collaborations with Disney for whom he contributed many story sketches and illustrations, not least for Fantasia.

== Biography ==
=== Early life ===
Kay Nielsen was born in Copenhagen into an artistic family; both of his parents were actors - Nielsen's father, Martinus Nielsen, was the director of Dagmarteater and his mother, Oda Nielsen, was one of the most celebrated actresses of her time, both at the Royal Danish Theater and at the Dagmarteater. Kay Nielsen studied art in Paris at Académie Julian and Académie Colarossi from 1904 to 1911, and then lived in England from 1911 to 1916. He received his first English commission from Hodder and Stoughton to illustrate a collection of fairy tales, providing 24 colour plates and more than 15 monotone illustrations for In Powder and Crinoline, Fairy Tales Retold by Sir Arthur Quiller-Couch in 1913. In the same year, Nielsen was also commissioned by The Illustrated London News to produce a set of four illustrations to accompany the tales of Charles Perrault; Nielsen's illustrations for 'Sleeping Beauty', 'Puss in Boots', 'Cinderella' and 'Bluebeard' were published in the 1913 Christmas Edition.

=== Artistic career ===
A year later in 1914, Nielsen provided 25 colour plates and more than 21 monotone images for the children's collection East of the Sun and West of the Moon. The colour images for both In Powder and Crinoline and East of the Sun and West of the Moon were reproduced by a 4-colour process, in contrast to many of the illustrations prepared by his contemporaries that characteristically utilized a traditional 3-colour process. Also in that year, Nielsen produced at least three illustrations depicting scenes from the life of Joan of Arc. When published later in the 1920s, these images were associated with relevant text from The Monk of Fife.

While painting landscapes in the Dover area, Nielsen came into contact with The Society of Tempera Painters where he learned new skills, and was able to reduce the time involved in the painting process. In 1917 Nielsen left for New York where an exhibition of his work was held and subsequently returned to Denmark. Together with a collaborator, Johannes Poulsen, he painted stage scenery for the Royal Danish Theatre in Copenhagen. During this time, Nielsen also worked on an extensive suite of illustrations intended to accompany a translation of The Arabian Nights that had been undertaken by the Arabic scholar, Professor Arthur Christensen. According to Nielsen's own published comments, these illustrations were to be the basis of his return to book illustrations following a hiatus during World War I and the intention had been to publish the Danish version in parallel with versions for the English-speaking world and the French market. The project never came to fruition and Nielsen's illustrations remained unknown until many years after his death.

During the 1920s, Nielsen returned to stagecraft in Copenhagen designing sets and costumes for professional theater. During that time, at age 40, he married the charismatic 22-year-old Ulla Pless-Schmidt, daughter of a wealthy physician, and they became a devoted couple. At this point, he was Scandinavia's most famous artist.

Following his theatrical work in Copenhagen, Nielsen returned to contributing to illustrated books with the publication of Fairy Tales by Hans Christian Andersen in 1924. That title included 12 colour plates and more than 40 monotone illustrations. The colour images were prepared with integrated formal and informal borders; the informal borders were produced in a mille fleur style. A year later, Nielsen provided the artwork for Hansel and Gretel, and Other Stories by the Brothers Grimm which was first published with 12 colour images and over 20 detailed monotone illustrations. A further 5 years passed before the publication of Red Magic, the final title to be illustrated comprehensively by Nielsen. The 1930 version of Red Magic included 8 colour and more than 50 monotone contributions from the Danish artist.

=== Work at Disney ===
In 1939 Nielsen left for California and worked for Hollywood companies. A personal recommendation from Joe Grant to Walt Disney secured Nielsen a job with The Walt Disney Company, where his work was used in the Night on Bald Mountain/Ave Maria sequences of Fantasia. Nielsen was renowned at the Disney studio for his concept art and he contributed artwork for many Disney films, including concept paintings for a proposed adaptation of Hans Christian Andersen's The Little Mermaid. The adaptation was to be part of a package film containing various segments based on Andersen's fairy tales. The film was made over 50 years after his involvement with Disney. Nielsen worked for The Walt Disney Company for 4 years, from 1937 to 1941 before being let go as his work was seen as too dark. He was brought back briefly in the 1950s for Sleeping Beauty. Kay Nielsen continues to be credited for his work at the Disney company and is ascribed for inspiring the visual development of Frozen.

== Final years and death ==
Nielsen briefly returned to Denmark in desperation. However, he found his works no longer in demand there either. His final years were spent in poverty. His last works were for local schools and churches, and his painting for the Wong Chapel at the First Congregational Church, Los Angeles, illustrating the 23rd Psalm. One of his final works was a mural installed at Central Junior High School, Los Angeles entitled 'The First Spring' Kay Nielsen's opportunity to express his appreciation to his nation which has given him a welcome and freedom to paint in the tragic final years of his life.

A heavy smoker, Nielsen contracted a chronic cough that would plague him until his death on June 21, 1957, at the age of 71. His funeral service was held under his mural in the Wong Chapel. His wife, Ulla, died the following year.

Before her death to diabetes, Ulla gave Nielsen's remaining illustrations to fellow artist and architect Frederick Monhoff, who in turn tried to place them in museums. However, none – American or Danish – would accept them at the time.

== Bibliography ==
- ___ In Powder and Crinoline (Hodder & Stoughton, London, 1913)
- ___ East of the Sun and West of the Moon (Hodder & Stoughton, London, 1914)
- Quiller-Couch, A. T. Twelve Dancing Princesses (Doran, NY, 1923 (Reprint of In Power and Crinoline))
- ___ Andersen's Fairy Tales (Hodder & Stoughton, London,1924)
- ___ Hansel and Gretel (Hodder & Stoughton, London, 1925)
- Wilson, R. Red Magic (Cape, London 1930)

== Filmography ==
Year	Title	Credits
1940	Fantasia	Art Director - Segment "Night on Bald Mountain/Ave Maria"
1956	The Magical World of Disney (TV Series)	Layout Artist and Art Stylist - "The Plausible Impossible"
1959	Sleeping Beauty	Concept Illustrator

== See also ==
The Play of Everyman
