= Margaret Yandes Holliday =

American Presbyterian missionary

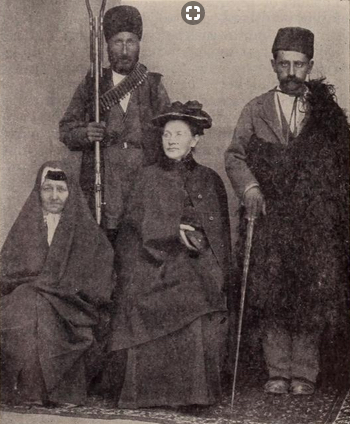
Grettie Y. Holliday, center, with her "itinerating party" (including translator, cook, and aide), from a 1909 publication.

Margaret Yandes Holliday (1844 — March 17, 1920), known as Grettie Y. Holliday, was an American Presbyterian missionary working in Tabriz, Persia (Iran) from 1883 to 1919.

== Early life ==
Margaret Yandes Holliday was born in Indianapolis, Indiana, the daughter of William A. Holliday and Lucia Shaw Holliday. Her father was pastor of the First Presbyterian Church of Indianapolis. She attended McLean's Female Seminary in Indianapolis, graduating in 1858.

== Career ==
Holliday, the only daughter of four surviving Holliday children, took care of her aging mother as a young woman. She became a missionary in her late thirties, after her mother died in 1881. She arrived in Tabriz in 1883, and served there for 37 years, sponsored by the Women's Foreign Missionary Society of the First Presbyterian Church of Indianapolis. She taught briefly at the mission's girls' school, but had no background or particular interest in teaching children; instead, she found her work in visiting villages as, in effect, an itinerant lay preacher, traveling with an interpreter and preaching about the Gospel in makeshift halls.

She wrote letters home to the women's groups who sponsored her work, reporting about events in the region, including her observations on the Hamidian massacres: "Any pretext is sufficient for a slaughter of Armenians – first one is used, then another. The favorite pretext used by the Turkish government is that the Armenians are in a state of rebellion. To the best of my knowledge, and after careful investigation and observation, I can say that this is not true. The Armenians are peaceable, and would be good citizens if left alone," she explained in 1895. "The Armenians need help, and the help should be given in a proper way, so that it will reach them."

Holliday also wrote articles for missionary publications, and spoke to American church women's groups during her furloughs in 1888–1889, 1909, and 1919. She attended a mission conference in Lucknow in 1911.

The authorship of an anonymous book, Islam and Christianity, or the Quran and the Bible: A Letter to a Muslim Friend (American Tract Society 1901) has been attributed to Grettie Y. Holliday.

== Personal life ==
Grettie Y. Holliday died after a stroke, while on furlough in Indianapolis in 1920, aged 76 years. Her papers are archived at the Indiana Historical Society.
