= Cecil Henry Floyd =

American serial killer

- Born: 1945; Indianapolis, Indiana, U.S.
- Died: June 17, 2011 (aged 66); Michigan City, Indiana, U.S.
- Convictions: Indiana: Murder; Florida: Murder x3 Nebraska: Murder; Kansas: Murder
- Penalty: Indiana: Life imprisonment without parole Florida: Unknown (Note: It is unclear whether Floyd was sentenced to death or life imprisonment in these cases); Nebraska: Life imprisonment without parole Kansas: Never officially sentenced

Details
- Victims: 6–11
- Span of crimes: 1973–1974
- Country: United States
- States: Indiana, Florida, Nebraska, Kansas
- Date apprehended: July 24, 1974

Cecil Henry Floyd (1945 – June 17, 2011) was an American serial killer who, together with his wife, murdered at least six people during robberies across four states between 1973 and 1974. Convicted and sentenced to life imprisonment for the cases in Indiana and Nebraska, Floyd later confessed to killing eleven people in total, but these claims were never verified.

Floyd remained behind bars until his death in an Indiana prison in 2011.

== Early life ==
Cecil Henry Floyd was born in 1945 in Indianapolis, Indiana, a child of Cecil Moses Floyd and Sarah Pearl Farlow. Little is known about his early life, but his first known run-in with the law was in 1959, when he was fined $55 for careless driving and driving without a license.

In 1971, Floyd married 23-year-old Lorna Jean Kern, who would go on to aid him in his crime spree. According to later interviews, Lorna claimed that she met Floyd at a motel in Macon, Georgia, and was essentially forced into marrying him because he threatened to hurt her children from a previous marriage. She claimed that he was very paranoid about the police arresting him and often mistreated the children by washing their mouths with soap, putting hot peppers in their mouths or punching them until their noses were bloodied.

== Murders ==
Floyd's first known murder occurred on July 23, 1973. On that date, he was traveling with two other people near the Boone County Fair in Lebanon, Indiana when he came across 15-year-old Henry Michael Maser. Maser had gone to the Fair with a friend of his, 16-year-old Frank Clark, but at one point wandered off after the pair visited a ball-toss booth. Floyd pulled out a gun and shot Maser three times in the head before stealing his wallet containing only $5 and then fleeing the scene. Maser's body was found six days later in some underbrush, with an autopsy concluding that he had been shot to death.

At around the time Maser's body was discovered, Indiana police tracked down and arrested Robert Stewart in Jonesboro, Georgia on a charge of stealing an automobile from a motel near the Fair where Maser had disappeared. He was initially considered a suspect in the case due to the fact that he was a carnival worker, but when questioned, Stewart claimed that he had nothing to do with that case and that he had been accompanied by a blond young man in the auto theft case. After successfully passing a polygraph test, Stewart was ruled out from the case and the murder charges against him were dropped.

On November 14, Floyd, accompanied by 36-year-old Thomas Mattingly, broke into the Durands Motel in Union Park, Florida, intent on robbing the owners - 56-year-old Barney M. Rycyk and his brother, Stanley Rycyk. The Rycyks had purchased the motel in March from an old friend using their life savings, and had been robbed of $100 in an unrelated robbery on a previous occasion. This time, Floyd and Mattingly broke in and bludgeoned Barney with a claw hammer 66 times before stuffing his body in the office bathroom, stealing $20 and attempting to flee. Just as they were leaving, they were noticed by Stanley, who was just returning from a shopping trip, and asked what they were doing. One of them lied that his brother was just showing them a room, upon which Stanley said that he was willing to show them a room if he consulted with his brother first. After following him halfway through the corridor, the two men suddenly fled towards their car, got in and sped away. An alarmed Stanley quickly searched through the rooms and found his brother's body, after which he ran outside and managed to catch a glimpse of the car's license plate, which he relayed to the sheriff's deputies as well descriptions of the two men. When they checked the information, authorities learned that a car with Indiana license plates had purchased gasoline with a card at a nearby gas station, and that the license plate number given was only two digits off.

On February 20, 1974, James Chitwood returned home to his apartment on 3948 County Club Drive in Orlando, Florida only to discover the mutilated body of his 17-year-old wife, Karen Chitwood, lying on the floor. Karen was clad only in her panties; had been bound and gagged; her skull was crushed and she had been stabbed four times in the chest with a butcher knife. Despite these injuries, an autopsy concluded that she was not sexually assaulted, with police speculating that she was surprised during a robbery. He immediately called the police, who quickly determined that the killer or killers had stolen a 10-inch General Electric television set and a clock radio from the apartment, indicating that it was a robbery. However, as they were unable to find any clues for the time being, the case quickly went cold.

On May 11, 22-year-old medical technician student Leslie Johnston was reported missing from Orlando. A week later, her body was found in a heavily wooded area, with the evident cause of death being three gunshot wounds to the upper torso. After Floyd's arrest, he claimed that he was attempting to tie Johnston up with a pink ribbon when she broke free, grabbed his pistol and shot at him. He then managed to wrestle it out of her arms and shot her.

On July 13, Nebraska State Trooper Paul Harding pulled into a Phillips 66 gas station near Aurora, Nebraska to fill up his car, but noticed that nobody was coming out to service him. Harding then went into the gas station, where he heard what sounded like "gurgling" noises coming from the bathroom. When he rushed to check, he found the attendant, 24-year-old Lester Schmidt, lying on the floor in a pool of blood with three gunshot wounds. Harding turned him on his side to drain the blood and called an ambulance, which rushed Schmidt to the Aurora Memorial Hospital, where he succumbed to his injuries without regaining consciousness. An investigation of the crime scene determined that the station's cash register had been stolen, along with $500 in cash. Despite a sizeable search involving a police helicopter sweeping the area, local authorities were initially unable to find any clues.

The Dickinson County John Doe is the name given to an unidentified man whose mutilated remains were found on a dirt road near Upland, Kansas on July 24 by a man who was visiting his parents. It is believed he was a white male hitchhiker between the ages of 25 and 31, and was evidently shot to death. Recalling the events later, Floyd stated that he picked him up somewhere in western Kansas and then pulled up to the dirt road several hours later under the guise of fixing his rear car tire. He asked the man to help out, and when the victim exited the vehicle, Floyd shot him several times, robbed him and left him for dead. He then took out the cash from his wallet, and threw the wallet away.

== Investigation and arrest ==
On July 17, the FBI issued a federal arrest warrant charging Floyd with the kidnapping of 18-year-old Harold Warren McQuinney from Micanopy, Florida on June 30. McQuinney remained in captivity for a day before managing to escape in Jasper, Tennessee, where he notified authorities about what had happened. Floyd remained on the run and committed additional crimes, including robbing a gas station in Lonoke, Arkansas. On July 24, he and his wife were caught by sheriff's deputies in the Lonoke area after an FBI agent tipped them off. The three children in the car - two children from Lorna's previous marriage and the couple's only child - were taken into child protective services after the Floyds were arrested.

While detained without bond for armed robbery in Arkansas, the Floyds were linked to the murder of Schmidt. Prosecuting attorney Samuel Weems agreed to waive extradition proceedings to have the suspects tried in Nebraska, all the while the Floyds were being investigated for several others committed across Indiana, Florida, Kansas, Nebraska, North Carolina, Tennessee and Missouri. On July 29, Floyd's wife Lorna was extradited to Orlando, where she was to be held as a material witness in three of the murders linked to her husband. On that same day, deputies from Florida were dispatched to transfer Thomas Mattingly to the state, as he faced first-degree murder charges in Rycyk's murder.

In interviews with detectives, Lorna claimed that she was an unwilling accomplice in the crime spree and that she was not present at the Chitwood and Rycyk murders, but "knew about them". In the meantime, Floyd himself confessed responsibility for six of the murders he was accused of, as well as the June 30 rape of a 23-year-old Orlando woman whom he later imprisoned in his car trunk.

In February 1975, Dickinson County Attorney Steve Opat filed murder charges against Floyd for the murder of the unidentified hitchhiker found in Kansas.

== Trials, imprisonment and death ==
In August 1974, Floyd was arraigned on murder and false imprisonment charges in the Orlando cases. In January 1975, he pleaded guilty on all counts, but sentencing was delayed so he could be tried in other states. On March 5, he waived extradition to Indiana. In that same month, Mattingly was convicted for his role in the murder of Barney Rycyk, but was spared from the death penalty after the jury recommended that he sentenced to life imprisonment instead. At trial, both he and his attorney contended that Mattingly was innocent and that Floyd was the sole killer.

In May 1975, Floyd was convicted for the murder of Schmidt and given a life term, after which he was imprisoned at the Indiana State Prison in Michigan City. At some later point, Floyd was convicted of the murder of Maser and given a second life term. As for the Kansas case, it was decided that he would not be sentenced due to the fact that he was already serving multiple life terms, and it was officially closed.

In 1998, more than twenty-four years after his conviction, Florida officials sought to extradite Floyd back to their state with the intent of seeking the death penalty against him. This was possible because under Florida law at the time, even if Floyd had pleaded guilty, he was still eligible for the death penalty and had not been officially sentenced yet. Whether he was eventually extradited and sentenced is unclear, but an official statement from a spokesman at the Indiana Department of Correction indicated that Floyd died behind bars on June 17, 2011, of natural causes.

== Exhumation of unidentified victim ==
In October 2016, the Dickinson County Sheriff's Office and the Kansas Bureau of Investigation exhumed the body of Floyd's unidentified murder victim in an attempt to identify him. Three years later, a fundraiser was started to erect headstones for this victim and a Jane Doe who were the only murder victims buried in the Abilene Cemetery in Abilene, Kansas.

As of January 2025, the man remains unidentified.

== See also ==
- List of serial killers in the United States
