= Frederick Monhoff =

American architect

- Born: November 23, 1897; New York City, NY, USA
- Died: October 11, 1975 (aged 77); Calistoga, CA, USA
- Spouse: June Hildegarde Flanner (1926-)

Frederick Monhoff, AIA, (November 23, 1897 – October 11, 1975) was an American architect, artist, and illustrator. His architectural style ranged from art deco to mid-century modern, while his etchings of the 1920s-30s documented scenes of Native American and Mexican life in the American Southwest.

== Early life and family ==
Frederick Monhoff was born in New York City to Emil Monhoff (1865-1922) and Maria Therese Kremer Monhoff (1864-1951). As a boy, Monhoff moved to Los Angeles with his family. He served in the United States Navy during World War I and later attended the University of California, Berkeley where he received an M.A. in 1921. At Berkeley, Monhoff served on the staff of the school's literary journal The Occident.

On June 29, 1926, Monhoff married June Hildegarde Flanner and they settled in Altadena, California. Monhoff illustrated several of Flanner's books of poetry and essays with his drawings and etchings. The couple had one child, John, born March 15, 1941. Hildegarde's sister was Janet Flanner, a long time Paris correspondent for The New Yorker, (writing under the pen name Genet). In 1962, Monhoff and his family moved north to Calistoga, California, in the Napa Valley and he died there in 1975.

== Career ==
Monhoff served as a design architect for the Los Angeles County Architectural Divisions and designed numerous public buildings and private residences in Southern California in the Los Angeles area, Malibu, Santa Barbara, Palm Springs, Orange County, and in Northern California in the Napa Valley. Monhoff taught design at the Otis Art Institute in Los Angeles (1926-1950) and at the Pasadena Art Institute (1959). During the 1940s, he also taught architecture at the University of California, Los Angeles (UCLA).

In 1924, the International Printmakers Society of California awarded Monhoff a bronze medal for Best Print or Best Series of Prints. Monhoff's etching Burning of Clothes, Pinion Indian Reservation is listed in the Art Institute of Chicago's 1932 exhibition catalog First International Exhibition of Etching and Engraving. In early 2000, Monhoff's work was featured in the Sweet Briar College gallery exhibition, White to Blue: American Art as Reflection of Social Class in the 20th Century. The Frederick Monhoff Memorial Prize and The Frederick Monhoff Printing Lab at Otis College of Art and Design in Los Angeles, California are named in his honor.

Collections of Monhoff's archived papers, architectural plans, and art work are held at University of California, Los Angeles (UCLA), the De Young Museum in San Francisco and the Smithsonian American Art Museum in Washington, D.C.

Monhoff was a member of the American Institute of Architects from 1946-1949, and from 1965 until his death.

== Major works ==
=== Buildings ===
- 3450 Ben Lomond Place, Los Feliz Knolls, Los Angeles, California (1927)
- 822 North Roxbury Drive, Beverly Hills, California (1928)
- 787 E. Sonora, Palm Springs, California (1948)
- Biltmore Hotel, Palm Springs, California (1948; demolished in 2003)
- 110 Anita Drive, Pasadena, California (1948)
- 3101 Clarmeya Lane, Pasadena, California (1948)
- 1204 N Beverly Glen Blvd, Los Angeles, California (1948)
- 1975 Micheltorena Street, Silver Lake, Los Angeles, California (1950)
- 630 Georgina Ave., Santa Monica, California (1950)
- 420 7th St., Santa Monica, California (1951)
- 46142 Golden Rod Lane Palm Desert, CA (1951)

=== Etchings ===
- Burning of Clothes, Pinion Indian Reservation. National Gallery of Art
- Indian and Mexican Traders, Santa Cruz, New Mexico. The de Young Museum, San Francisco, California
- Marriage Ceremony, Santa Clara, New Mexico. The de Young Museum, San Francisco, California
- Oil Workers. National Gallery of Art
- Oil. National Gallery of Art
- Old Church, Zuni, New Mexico. The de Young Museum, San Francisco, California
- Penitent Motive. The Harwood Museum of Art, Taos, New Mexico
- Penitente Ceremony, Nambe, New Mexico. The de Young Museum, San Francisco, California
- Procession of St. Mary, Santa Fe, New Mexico. The de Young Museum, San Francisco, California
- Wedding Procession. Nora Eccles Harrison Museum of Art.
- Worshippers at Cathedral, Santa Fe, New Mexico. The de Young Museum, San Francisco, California

=== Illustrations ===
- Time's Profile, by Hildegarde Flanner with illustrations by Frederick Monhoff, first published by Macmillan Company (1929)
- Valley Quail, by Hildegarde Flanner with illustrations by Frederick Monhoff, first published by The Ward Ritchie Press (1929)
- In Native Light, by Hildegarde Flanner with illustrations by Frederick Monhoff, first published by James E. Beard (1970)
- A Vanishing Land, by Hildegarde Flanner with illustrations by Frederick Monhoff, first published by No Dead Lines (1980)
- Brief Cherishing: A Napa Valley Harvest, by Hildegarde Flanner with illustrations by Frederick Monhoff, first published by John Daniel and Co. (1985)
