= David Michael Schuster =

American spinto tenor (born 1952)

David Michael Schuster (born 1952) is an American spinto tenor.

== Biography ==
Schuster was born in Indianapolis, Indiana. He studied with Robert Rockabrand at Ball State University, composer Sam Morgenstern in New York City, Kammersänger Frederick Mayer in Munich, and most recently, Metropolitan Opera tenor, Thomas Studebaker. He has a career which spans nearly 40 years, from his debut with the Albany Symphony Orchestra in Albany, New York, and recital debut at Carnegie Recital Hall in New York City in 1981, to the stages of Spoleto, Italy and the Bavarian State Opera in Munich, Germany, where he was a leading tenor from 1989 to 1995 singing Radames (Aida), The King (Love of Three Oranges) and the world premiere of Ubu Rex by Penderecki where he was double-cast with Robert Tear as King Ubu.

Critics said of Schuster's recital debut, “[He] shows a young tenor voice not only unusually rich and full in the lower register, but unforced and brilliant in the upper register as well.” Schuster was a tenor soloist with the RTSI Orchestra in Lugano, Switzerland, where he performed many different operatic roles as well as many oratorios. Schuster also toured throughout Europe with the Compagnie d’Opera di Milano as Manrico (Il Trovatore) and Pinkerton (Madama Butterfly). The German television program Westfälische Rundschau commented on his portrayal of Manrico, saying “Herr Schuster was an equal to all the Italians on stage and has a resonantly strong voice ... full of temperament and solid on stage.” And the French press Liberation noted on the performance of Meyerbeer's Les Huguenots, "[t]he last tenor who could negotiate the tricky tessitura of this role (Raoul) was Franco Corelli. Mr. Schuster follows quite unhindered in Mr. Corelli’s footsteps."

As a sidenote to his operatic and concert career, in 1986 Mr. Schuster was hired by a film company to provide the singing voice overs for the Christmas classic "Babes in Toyland" and as vocal coach for Drew Barrymore. He provided the voices for Keanu Reeves (Jack) and Googy Gress (Georgie) as well as recording the voices of Richard Mulligan (Barnaby) and Pat Morita (Toymaster). His voice only appears in the film as Jack and Georgie. Musical conductor Ian Fraser said when asked, "I'll never let on you can really sing."

In 2007, together with friend and colleague, counter-tenor Timothy Linwood, he founded Amocanti Inc., a non-profit corporation to promote the education and the understanding of classical vocal music. The organization presents concerts using singers who have or have had careers but may not have reached the top of the profession. Many of the participants are now lawyers, doctors, bankers, etc. The concerts are done informally, with singers' round-table discussions with the audience. While based in New York, Amocanti partnered with DELTUR Kunst- und Musikagentur in Heide, Germany in January 2011 to form Amocanti Europe. The hope is that Amocanti and Amocanti Europe will have franchises around the globe continuing to educate, inform and entertain the millions of school-aged children and their parents who do not have easy access to classical vocal music.

In April 2011, following the devastating tsunami in Japan, Schuster together with DELTUR spearheaded the recording of Daniel Léo Simpson's Ave Maria as part of the international Support Japan effort.

During 2011, Schuster, in partnership with mezzo-soprano Debra Patchell, released two CD's - PS* Because We're Not Finished Yet and PS - It's Christmas.

In January 2012, Schuster, together with award-winning guitarist, Peter Fletcher, appeared at Carnegie Hall Weill Auditorium in a program of music for the voice and guitar. Included were the world premiere of Clarice Assad's Enquanto a noite durar (While the night endures) and the New York premiere of Mario Castelnuovo-Tedesco's The Divan of Moses-ibn-Ezra, op. 207. "Viva! New York" critic Lucas Eller wrote: "From the text, written in English, [The Divan] seemed a ponderous piece, recounting the exile of a 12th century rabbi and philosopher in Spain through his search for God, and the meaning of life and love and death. Mr. Schuster’s diction was crisp and clear and it was easy to follow the story as it was told without having to refer to the program. In fact, The Divan seemed more like a one-act opera, full of drama and pathos, joy and sorrow. Mr. Fletcher played masterfully, creating many moments of contrast and rhythms. Despite its length (nearly 45 minutes), the audience was swept away by the tale of this 12th century figure; spellbound by Mr. Schuster’s convincing performance, waking as the last lines of text were spoken dramatically rather than sung, and applauding enthusiastically."

In 2015, the tenor returned to Indianapolis where he joined the Indianapolis Symphonic Choir and performed as soloist with the combined Chinese American choirs in a performance of a Chinese Cantata in commemoration of the 70th anniversary of the end of World War II. In 2016 Schuster will be heard as soloist in Schubert's Mass in C (February) and with the Butler Opera Theater in a production of "Pirates of Penzance" (April).

In 2017, Mr. Schuster presented a solo concert "American Composers - Then and Now", as part of the Butler Artists Series, featuring the works of classical composers such as Hoiby, Barber, Rorem and premiered the cycle "Fair Haiku" by Michael Scherperel. A recording will be released in early 2018.

Following the success of the "American Composers", the artist was invited to take part in the Duckwall Artist Series, where the program is all German ("Ein Deutscher Abend") and will present another cycle composed by Michael Scherperel, "Tagträume", for tenor, string trio and clarinet, as well as works of Beethoven, Mahler and Wagner. This concert will be broadcast and recorded live for release in the summer. Mr. Schuster will then be in Germany for a performance of Franck's "Sieben Letzten Worte" on Good Friday.

== Career milestones ==
- 1980 – Albany Symphony Orchestra, tenor soloist; orchestral debut
- 1981 – Carnegie Recital Hall; New York debut
- 1982 – European concert debut, American Cathedral, Paris
- 1986 – Film Voiceovers (Babes in Toyland) for Keanu Reeves and Googy Gress
- 1986 – Il Duca, Rigoletto, Spoleto Festival, Italy; European operatic debut
- 1991 – Ubu Rex by Penderecki, Bayerische Staatsoper, Germany; Staatsoper debut; first recorded performance
- 2007 – First performance of Amocanti
- 2010 – Off-Broadway production of "Broadcast from Bethlehem"
- 2011 – The PS Tour; planned European tour with mezzo-soprano Debra Patchell
- 2012 – January 10 Carnegie Hall (Weill) with classical guitarist Peter Fletcher in New York debut of Castelnuovo-Tedesco's The Divan of Moses ibn Ezra
- 2012 – European tour with Peter Fletcher (planned)
- 2015 – Joined Indianapolis Symphonic Choir
- 2016 – "Pirates of Penzance" Butler University Opera Theater
- 2016 – April 23 Indianapolis solo concert "American Classical Composers"
- 2016 – Spring/summer "American Classical Composers" concerts European tour (planned cities Milan and Munich).

== Personal life ==
Schuster divides his time between Avon, Indiana, New York and Munich, Germany.
