= Indiana State Teachers' Retirement Fund =

The Indiana State Teachers’ Retirement Fund (TRF) was created by the Indiana General Assembly in 1921. Today, TRF manages and distributes the retirement benefits of educators in all public schools, as well as some charter schools and universities, throughout Indiana. Headed by a governor-appointed executive director and a six-member Board of Trustees, TRF aims to prudently manage the fund in accordance with fiduciary standards, provide quality benefits, and deliver a high level of service to TRF members while demonstrating responsibility to the citizens of the state.

== Members ==
All legally qualified teachers who are regularly employed in the public school system of Indiana or in qualified positions at certain state institutions, as well as all TRF employees, must be members of TRF. Some legally qualified state employees and employers are eligible for optional enrollment. A legally qualified substitute teacher may become a member of TRF upon completion of one year of service (defined as 120 days in one fiscal year or 60 days in each of any two fiscal years).

As of June 30, 2008, TRF had over 150,000 active, inactive, and retired members and beneficiaries and managed approximately $8.6 billion in assets.

== Benefit ==
The TRF benefit consists of two parts: the monthly pension benefit and the Annuity Savings Account (ASA).

The monthly pension benefit is determined by salary history, years of service, age, and the retirement option selected. TRF members become vested in the pension benefit after 10 years of qualified Indiana service. Members may purchase service credit for military service, out-of-state teaching, and qualified leaves of absence.

The Annuity Savings Account (ASA) is made up of voluntary and mandatory contributions, as well as investment earnings, and is based on the balance at the time of retirement and the payment option selected. TRF members allocate their ASA contributions among different investment options offered by TRF, each with a specified level of risk.

A TRF member may also create a Rollover Savings Account by transferring funds from an individual retirement account (IRA) or other qualified retirement plan into TRF.

== Retirement ==
Planning for Retirement
TRF offers one-on-one benefit appointments where members can meet with a benefit specialist to review a benefit estimate and ask any questions about the retirement process. Although any member is welcome to schedule an appointment, it is especially encouraged for those who are within two years of retirement. Appointments may be held in the Indianapolis office or over the phone.

Payment Options
When members retire, they must select one of six alternatives for the distribution of the monthly pension benefit portion of their retirement. Members may also choose the Social Security Integration option with any of the six listed options.

Pension Benefit Option	Description
A-1	The member will receive a lifetime monthly benefit. If the member dies before receiving five years of benefit payments, the member's designated beneficiary will receive the remainder of the five years of payments.
A-2	The member will receive a lifetime monthly benefit. If the member chooses either the ASA 1 or ASA 7 option, the A-2 comes with a minimum amount provision that ensures the member or beneficiary will receive a benefit at least equal to the Annuity Savings Account (ASA) balance at the time of retirement.
A-3	The member will receive a lifetime monthly benefit. If the member dies before receiving five years of payments, the beneficiary will receive the remainder of the five years of guaranteed pension payments. The ASA is reduced with each monthly benefit paid; if the member dies before reducing this balance to $0.00, the beneficiary will receive a single payment of the amount remaining. This pension option is only available with the ASA 1 or ASA 7.
B-1	The member will be paid a lifetime monthly benefit. Upon the member's death, a guarantee ensures that the designated, qualified survivor will receive 100% of the member's monthly benefit for the remainder of the survivor's life.
B-2	The member will be paid a lifetime monthly benefit. Upon the member's death, a guarantee ensures that the designated, qualified survivor will receive 66 2/3% of the member's monthly benefit for the remainder of the survivor's life.
B-3	The member will be paid a lifetime monthly benefit. Upon the member's death, a guarantee ensures that the designated, qualified survivor will receive 50% of the member's monthly benefit for the remainder of the survivor's life.
Social Security Integration	Members retiring between the ages of 50 and 62 may integrate their TRF benefit with their Social Security benefit. TRF pays a larger monthly benefit before age 62. However, benefit payments may be greatly reduced or terminated at age 62, depending on the member's estimated monthly Social Security disbursement. As TRF does not work in conjunction with Social Security, this selection will NOT affect the amount of the benefit received from Social Security.

When members retire, they must select one of the seven options for the distribution of their ASA.

ASA Option	Description
ASA 1	The member will receive the total amount of the ASA paid as a monthly benefit, resulting in a higher monthly benefit payment. A minimum amount provision ensures an amount equal to the ASA balance at the time of retirement will be paid either to the member or beneficiary.
ASA 2	The member will have the total amount of the ASA, less mandatory Federal Income Tax Withholding, paid directly to the member.
ASA 3	The member will have the taxable portion of the ASA paid in the form of a direct rollover to an IRA or Qualified Retirement Plan that accepts the rollover. An amount equal to the tax basis (after-tax contribution) in the ASA as of December 31, 1986, will be paid directly to the member.
ASA 4	The member will have part of the taxable portion of the ASA paid in the form of a direct rollover to an IRA or Qualified Retirement Plan that accepts the rollover. An amount equal to the tax basis in the ASA as of December 31, 1986, will be paid directly to the member. The part of the taxable portion not directly rolled over (less mandatory Federal Income Tax Withholding) will be paid directly to the member.
ASA 5	The member will defer distribution of the ASA until a later date. The account will continue to be invested with TRF under the same guidelines applicable to an ASA. Members may change ASA allocations quarterly.
ASA 6	The member will receive a distribution of an amount equal to the tax basis in the ASA balance as of December 31, 1986, and defer distribution of the remainder of the ASA until a later date. The account will continue to be invested with TRF under the same guidelines applicable to an ASA. Members may change allocations quarterly.
ASA 7	The member will receive a distribution of an amount equal to the tax basis in the ASA balance as of December 31, 1986. The remainder of the ASA will be paid as a monthly benefit. This option combines the monthly pension with the remainder of the ASA so the member may receive a higher monthly benefit payment. A minimum amount provision ensures an amount equal to the ASA balance at the time of retirement will be paid either to the member or beneficiary.

Minimum Amount Provision
The minimum amount provision is relevant to certain monthly pension benefit and ASA distribution options. The minimum amount provision guarantees that a member or the member's beneficiary will receive benefit payments that total at least the balance of the ASA at the time of retirement. If a member does not receive this minimum amount in combined annuity and pension payments during their lifetime, the member's beneficiary can claim the remaining amount due. For example, if a member has $100,000 in their ASA at the time of retirement, this member's total benefits (combined annuity and pension payments) must equal $100,000, or the member's beneficiary may claim the difference.

Disability Retirement
If a member with five or more years of service in a TRF-covered position becomes disabled while an active teacher, the member may be eligible for a classroom or retirement disability benefit.

Age 70 Benefits
A member who is age 70 or older with 20 or more years of service may continue to receive pension payments and continue to be employed in a covered position. In this situation, there is no required separation from service period and no earnings limitation. For any TRF member who continues employment while receiving monthly pension benefits, no employer share contributions are made to TRF, and no supplemental pension is earned.
