= Frank Flanner =

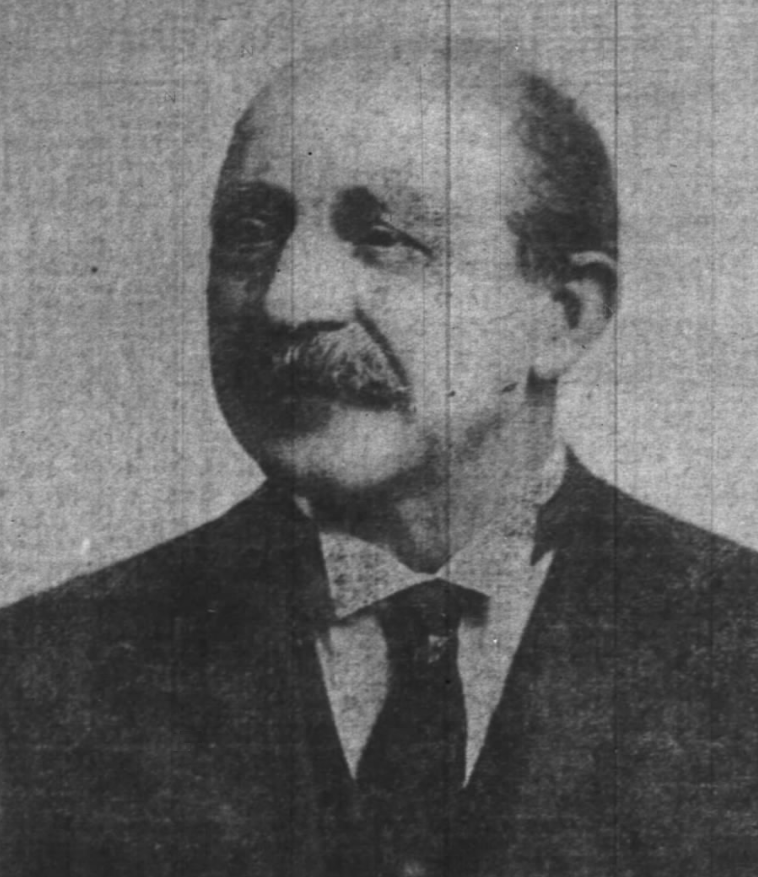
- Born: December 5, 1854; Mount Pleasant, Ohio
- Died: February 17, 1912 (aged 57); Indianapolis, Indiana
- Occupation: Mortician
- Spouse: Mary Ellen Hockett (m. 1886)
- Children: 3

Frank W. Flanner (December 5, 1854 – February 17, 1912) was an American mortician, woodcarver, philanthropist and humanitarian.

== Early life and family ==
Francis (Frank) William Flanner was born in Mount Pleasant, Ohio to Henry Beeson Flanner (1823–1863) and Orpha Annette Tyler (1824–1914). Frank came from a long line of Quakers and was raised in the small Quaker community of Mount Pleasant until he was 9 years old. His father served as a musician in the 113th Ohio Volunteer Infantry, an infantry regiment in the Union Army during the American Civil War. Upon the death of Henry Beeson Flanner in 1863, Frank, his mother and five siblings moved to Indianapolis, Indiana.

Frank Flanner married Mary Ellen Hockett, a school teacher and actress, in Marion, Indiana in 1886. The couple had three daughters — the noted journalist Janet Flanner, musician and composer Marie Flanner, and the poet and conservationist Hildegarde Flanner.

== Career ==
Despite his education as a Latin teacher, Flanner opened a funeral parlor in downtown Indianapolis and became Indiana's first licensed embalmer in 1881. Frank's brother-in-law, Charles J. Buchanan, joined the business a few years later and this partnership formed what was later named Flanner and Buchanan Funeral Centers. Renamed Flanner Buchanan in 2017, the business is still in operation and is owned by the Buchanan family.

== Philanthropy ==
In 1898, Flanner donated some property that he owned in Indianapolis to the Charity Organization Society for use as a settlement house called Flanner Guild. After Flanner's death in 1912, it was renamed Flanner House, serving as an African-American community service center to promote social, moral and physical welfare through educational and self-help programs; this coincided with a change in leadership and goals.
