= Flanner House =

Indianapolis social services organization

Coordinates: 39°48′6″N 86°10′18″W

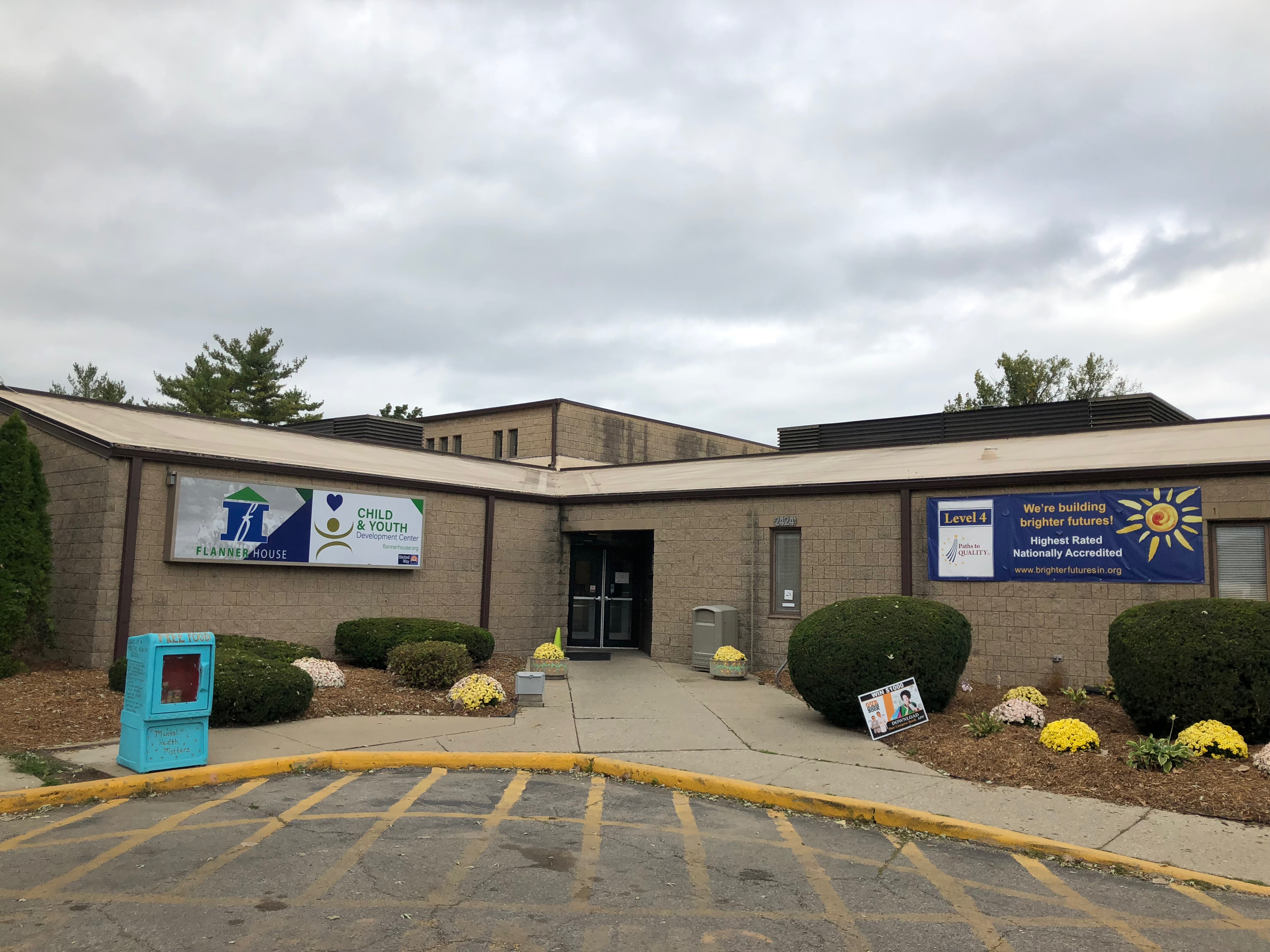
- Flanner House main building 2019
- Type: 501(c)(3) Public Charity
- Tax ID no.: 35-0942628
- Location(s): 2424 Dr. Martin Luther King Jr. Street; Indianapolis, Indiana 46208
- Region served: Indianapolis, Indiana
- Key people: Executive Director, Brandon D. Cosby; Director of Operations, Sandra Green; Director of Social Services, Debra White
- Website: Flanner House
- Formerly called: Flanner Guild

Flanner House is a social services organization, with a 2-acre farm, bodega, cafe, and orchard serving the Indianapolis community. It started in 1903 as an African-American community service center and was named for Frank Flanner. When Flanner died in 1912 and the organization fell on financial hardships, they changed the name from Flanner Guild to Flanner House and added many services with the financial assistance from the Christian Woman's Board of Missions. The organization continues to assist senior citizens, those in financial straits, families, children and much more.

== History ==
=== Frank Flanner and Flanner Guild ===
Flanner House was named after Frank Flanner (1854–1912), a local philanthropist and mortician. In 1898, he donated a piece of property containing two buildings to the Charity Organization Society, a group operating a social settlement for the city's white population. The purpose of this gift was to create an African-American community service center. This became the first settlement house, called Flanner Guild, for African-Americans in the city. The organization was incorporated in 1903 and within a short time the main building was built in what is presently Lockefield Gardens.

The purpose of the organization was to promote the social, moral, and physical welfare of the African-American community through the establishment and maintenance of academic and vocational education and self-help programs benefiting the surrounding community. Flanner Guild began operations in a small building on Colton Street under the direction of Sarah Colton Smith. The early programs of the organization were divided into several departments and included Employment, Recreation, Vocational Aids, Music, and a Day Nursery. One of Flanner Guild's first projects was the creation of a rescue home for unwed mothers and their children in 1908.

=== Flanner House ===
After Flanner's death in 1912, the agency faced financial difficulties that caused the board of directors to turn to the Christian Woman's Board of Missions for support. The Board was reorganized and the name of the organization was changed from Flanner Guild to Flanner House. Support received from the Board of Missions allowed Flanner House to continue operations and purchase a new facility by 1918. The new location at the corner of West and St. Clair Streets was purchased, remodeled and equipped with four buildings allowing for the creation of additional services including health clinics for tuberculosis and child care, a make over shop for clothing and furniture, and training classes through the Red Cross.

Flanner House was incorporated as a not-for-profit organization in 1935. In 1936, Cleo Blackburn began his tenure as Superintendent of Flanner House. Blackburn's primary goals included teaching individuals to achieve personal, economic and social progress. Under his leadership as Superintendent (1936–1975), a new facility was built and opened in 1944 at 16th and Missouri Streets (333 West 16th Street) as a result of the "Indianapolis Study." This study, an analysis of the city's black population, began in 1937 with a grant from the Indianapolis Foundation. Completed in 1939, the study gave the city's first complete survey of the financial, educational, cultural, and medical background of its black population.

Cleo Blackburn developed several dynamic programs that gave Flanner House national attention. Among those was his self-help housing project that began in 1946 called Flanner Homes, Inc. The project became a national model for providing local and federal funding to help low-income black war veterans (the first project participants) build their own homes. Developed with the support of the American Friends Service Committee, the Marshall Field Foundation, and Rosenwald Fund Support Division of Self-Help, the project helped revitalize the homes of the area while participants received free training house construction.

Also developed in 1946, was the Herman G. Morgan Health Center. This center was constructed with support from the Indianapolis Foundation and Indianapolis Board of Health and Hospitals. The program was unique because it was the only structure in the state of Indiana designed and constructed to provide preventive medicine and a public health program to the community it served. The services of the Health Center included annual physical examinations and immunizations as well as consultation and instruction in proper nutrition.

Organized by Cleo Blackburn in 1954, the Board of Fundamental Education was a nationally recognized experiment that built responsible citizens by teaching and encouraging their pride and initiative. Flanner House, in cooperation with other agencies (including Indiana University and Purdue University), improved and extended its services and became a national demonstration center of the Fundamental Education program. As a result, Blackburn received a congressional charter and obtained several large federal grants for the educational and health needs of the underprivileged.

In 1967, Flanner House moved to 2110 North Illinois Street and in 1979 to its present location at 2424 Dr. Martin Luther King Jr. Street. During the 1960s, the employment placement services were discontinued since this service fell under the jurisdiction of Marion County. Flanner House continued offering employment classes and added programs through Family Services and the Marion County Welfare Department.

Throughout the 1970s and 1980s, Flanner House continued to add programs targeted at the specific needs of the community it served, including assistance to homebound senior citizens, a residential youth center with case referrals from the juvenile courts, and the addition of a branch of the Marion County Public Library in 1979. In 1987, Flanner House became a member of Community Centers of Indianapolis, Inc. (CCI), a federation of neighborhood multi-service centers located in Indianapolis.

Today, Flanner House continues its mission of service and self-help through, senior citizen services, assistance programs for those in financial need, the Food Justice program, which includes the F.E.E.D. program and the Flanner Farm. Flanner House provides Economic Development initiatives that include a Great Places designation, and the Northwest Area Quality of Life initiative. There also is the Flanner House Child Development Center which provides care, and education for toddlers, and pre-school children. There is a Before and After Care program providing safe place care, and education for school-aged, and adolescent children. The agency also provides a Health and Wellness program through the onsite branch of the Center of Wellness for Urban Women. Flanner House is also a location for the Center for Working Families providing life skills, job readiness, and employment services through its unique Skills to Success program.

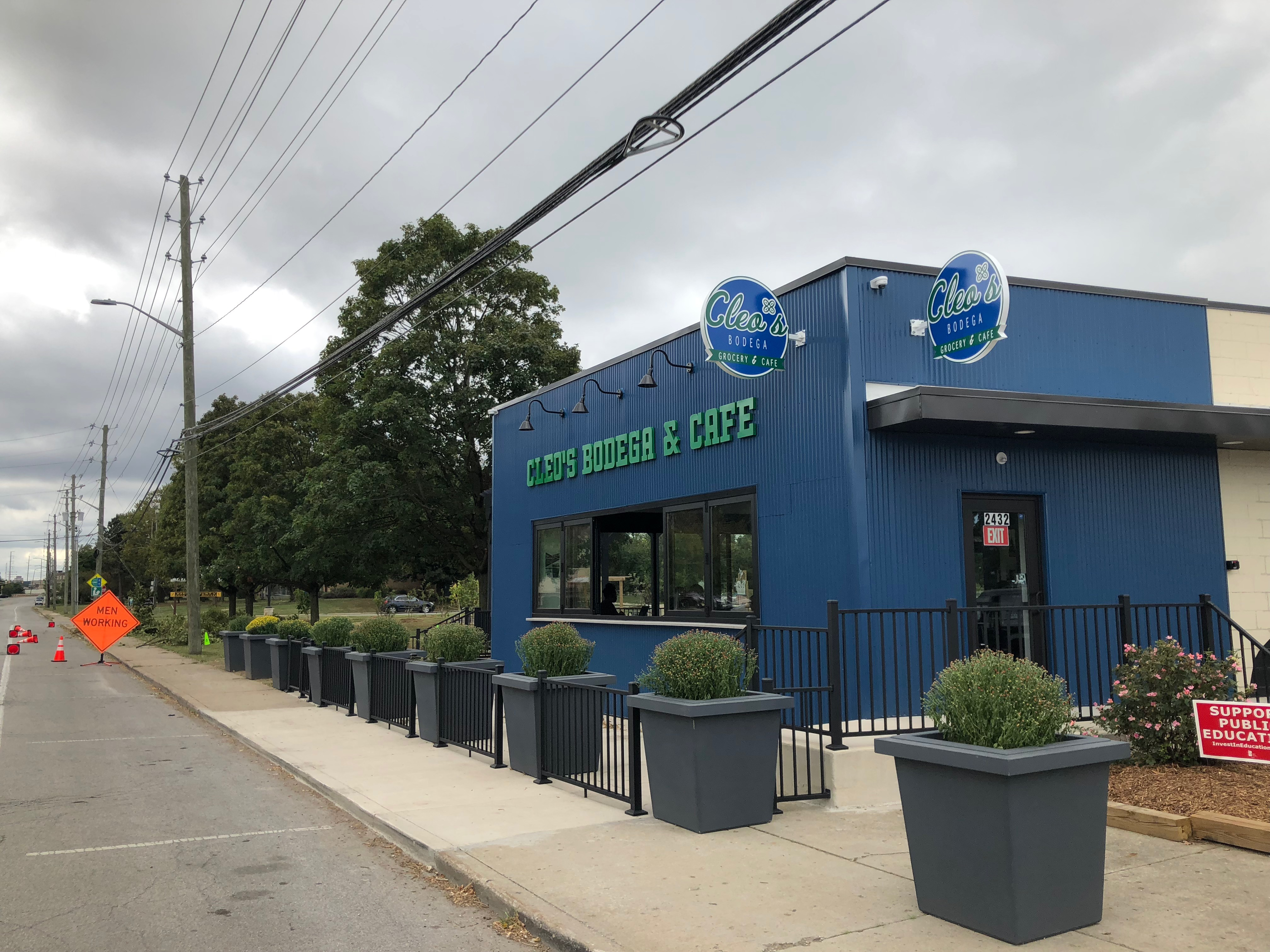
Cleo's Bodega & Cafe

=== Cleo's Bodega & Cafe ===
Located within the North West Area (NWA) of Indianapolis, Cleo's Bodega & Cafe serves as a food access hub for the community. The NWA is the largest food desert in Indianapolis. While also taking on the issue of food security, this project is a Workforce Development initiative with a commitment that the people who work in the store will be hired from the neighborhood and community through the Flanner House Community Center for Working Families Program. The store also serves as a place where not only produce from Flanner Farms, & Brandywine Creek Farms organic farming, is sold.

=== Ujamaa Community Bookstore ===
Ujamaa opened on Juneteenth in 2021 as a Black-owned business. The bookstore has classes for music, acting and roller skating. The store is named for a Swahili word that means "brotherhood". The intent is to provide knowledge of the history of Black Americans through books written by Black authors, as well as events geared towards Black culture and history. A wall of pictures of Black people throughout American history can be found in the back of the store, called "a living wall" by the manager, Rohini Townsend.

== Works or publications ==
- Booth Tarkington, 1869-1946; Flanner House (Indianapolis, Ind.). Flanner House of Indianapolis: 50th year. Indianapolis: Flanner House of Indianapolis. OCLC 63190364.
- Flanner House (Indianapolis, Ind.) (1939). The Indianapolis study. Indianapolis: The House. OCLC 8299190.
- Flanner House (Indianapolis, Ind.); Indianapolis Redevelopment Commission (1946). A study of 454 negro households in the redevelopment area, Indianapolis, Indiana, October, 1946. Indianapolis: Flanner House. OCLC 5461304.

== See also ==
- Flanner House Homes
- Lockefield Gardens
