= O Presidente Negro =

1926 novel by Monteiro Lobato

The Black President
- First edition
- Author: Monteiro Lobato
- Original title: O Presidente Negro
- Translator: Ana Lessa-Schmidt
- Language: Portuguese
- Genre: dystopian science fiction, future history, time travel
- Set in: Brazil, United States
- Publisher: Companhia Editora Nacional (1st edition), New London Librarium (English translation)
- Publication date: 1926
- Publication place: Brazil
- English publication date: 2022
- Media type: Print
- Pages: 274
- OCLC: 3638113
- Original text: O Presidente Negro at Portuguese Wikisource

The Black President (originally either The Clash of the Races or The Black President or Romance of the Clash of the Races in America in the Year 2228) (Note: Original: O Choque das Raças ou O Presidente Negro; Romance do Choque das Raças na América no Ano de 2228) is a work of dystopian science fiction published in 1926 and written by Monteiro Lobato, being the author's only novel written for adults.

The main story follows the first-person narrative of Ayrton Lobo and his conversations with Miss. Jane about the United States of the year 2228, witnessed through a porviroscope, about the dispute between the Men's Party and its representative, President Mr. Kerlog, seeking re-election, and the Elvinist Party, with Miss Astor as its candidate, against Jim Roy, the candidate of the Black Association for President of the United States, and the macabre outcome of the struggle for power.

== Plot ==
The book begins with a conversation at the London Bank between two friends who, after discussing the world, focus on the strange figure of Professor Benson, a reclusive scientist with great financial ability. We get to know the protagonist and his self-focused personality, as well as his work at Sá, Pato & Cia and his desire to rise socially by buying a car. He finally buys a Ford, but on a business trip, he gets into an accident due to his love of speed and is saved by Professor Benson's employees. After his recovery, Benson accepts him as a confidant, sending him for a walk in the open air before meeting him in his office, as a hook for the second chapter, which introduces the "strange castle" (Note: Felipe Chamy explores this definition by showing that it does not represent the reality of the building, but how Ayrton's imagination came to define it.) and its surroundings.

Upon his return, in Chapter III, the protagonist reveals his impressions of the strange laboratory and, when Dr. Benson arrives, we finally discover that the story is told by Ayrton Lobo. Then, in Chapter IV, lunch takes place, and we meet Miss Jane, who makes such an impression on the protagonist, and new details about the "mysterious invention". After lunch, the story continues with Professor Benson presenting his theories on reality, preparing an intellectual basis for Ayrton Lobo, before presenting his invention. From the intellectual part, they move on to the mechanical part, as a way of continuing to create a basis of understanding.

In the office, Ayrton Lobo, already getting used to Miss Jane, learns about her family's past and that she is a second-generation Brazilian, as well as developments for the future. The story continues with new conversations between Ayrton and Jane, both about the present moment and future developments, as well as the idea of writing a novel about the future. Dr. Benson, at the age of 70 and in poor health, leaves to destroy his invention, and dies at the end of the chapter. After the professor's death, Ayrton returns to his day-to-day work at the firm, but his mind is far from there... Seeing Miss Jane again, she asks him to come back every Sunday, as it would do her good and he could learn about future history.

A week later, Ayrton returns to Miss Jane, where they discuss various questions about the origin of the USA, as well as her planting curiosity about the events of the year 2228. Between chapters XI and XIII the future situation is presented, as well as the main characters of future history: Jim Roy, leader of the Black Association and a social leader of great influence; Miss Astor, representative of the Elvinist Party, together with the theoretical basis of its ideology; and President Kerlog, leader of the Men's Party, a fusion of the Democratic and Republican Parties. The story continues with the presentation of technologies such as radio transport, but Ayrton loses most of the narrative by daydreaming about Miss Jane.

The story returns a week later when Miss Jane spends some time exploring some future themes, such as Eropolis, making Ayrton Lobo daydream, and we move on to the moments before the election, with the tension in both the Men's Party and the Elvinist Party, hooking into the next chapter when Jim Roy decides, after long reflection, to put his own name in the ballot. Jim Roy transmits the password, which is discovered via espionage by the Envinist Party, which causes the group to disband and the alliance of its coreligionists with the Men's Party. Roy is elected with 54 million votes.

A week later, Ayrton Lobo considers declaring his love to Miss Jane, but loses his nerve when he finds her at her father's grave. As they return to discuss the events of 2228, Miss Jane recounts Roy and Kerlog's first meeting after the elections, as Roy wanted to prevent the country from descending into conflict, as Kerlog recognized Roy's genius and attributes, but nevertheless declared war on him, with Ayrton showing himself moved by the events. We return to see the outcome of the Elvinist Party which, although momentarily disbanded, has reconstituted itself over time. We explore a little of the ideological and scientific development of Elvinism, before returning to Kerlog who, despite raising the possibility of following the law and swearing in Roy, his Minister of Equity follows the "voice of the Blood" and the White Race Convention is called.

On a mid-week holiday, Ayrton Lobo returns and learns about the events of the White Convention, where representatives of the white ethnic group met with President Kerlog and, rather coldly and distantly, voted on the "Leland motion" (the content of which has been kept secret at this point in the narrative). Next, the figure of inventor John Dudley is introduced, who promises a solution to a problem that the government spends days trying to solve. In the end, it is revealed that Dudley invented the "Omega rays", which are capable of straightening afro hair – something that receives huge support and demand from the public. We follow Miss Astor and President Kerlog's love connection a little more closely, while Ayrton becomes frustrated with his difficulty in expressing himself – a frustration that ends in his dismissal from his job.

A week later, inspired by the film The Sea Beast with John Barrymore, Ayrton returns to discover the following events: on the eve of the inauguration, Kerlog goes to Jim Roy, who has been exposed to Omega rays and has felt his strength fading, and calmly, sensing the tragic atmosphere, reveals that Omega rays cause sterilization in those who use them. Discovering this, Roy falls unconscious in his office.

The next day, the government announces a new type of toy and, distracting the public, reveals the death of Jim Roy. New elections are called and Kerlog, married to Miss Astor, is re-elected with 100 million votes. Months later, the reality of the Leland motion and the sterilizing action of the Omega rays is revealed. The birth rate of the black population is dropped and decades later, there is only a blonde population with slightly coppery skin.

In the final chapter, we discover how the outcome of the narrative has left Ayrton Lobo shaken, but focused on his passion for Miss Jane, he spends the following week writing the first chapter of his novel, full of stylistic exaggerations. Miss Jane notes it, and Lobo goes a week without writing, frustrated. After being encouraged again to write with his personality, Lobo writes his own way, without corrections, which Miss Jane approves of. At the end, feeling happy, Ayrton kisses her, which is reciprocated.

== Composition ==
=== Narrative ===
Monteiro Lobato develops two timelines in his dystopia: the one between Ayrton Lobo and Miss. Jane in 1926, and the one that takes place in the year 2228, with the "story within a story" structure. The first part of the story follows Ayrton Lobo, described by Marisa Lajolo as "clumsy", and by Filipe Chamy as someone extremely imaginative, who suffers a car accident (Note: Luís Hellmeister de Camargo considers Ayrton Lobo to be a delusional man who believes that car owners are superior, but loses his savings in an automobile accident – which could be an unintentional criticism of Fordism.) and is cared for on the estate of Dr. Benson, a wealthy scientist, and his daughter, Miss Jane, according to researcher Carlos Minchillo, a "Sherazade"-like character, (Note: Dias notes the similarities between Miss Jane and the children's character Emília, saying that they both possess the power of speech, persuasion and are able to attract attention to themselves.) also a researcher and who doesn't think about "marriage, fashion and other “futilities".” The second part deals with the presidential race in 2228, which aims to elect the 88th president. According to Maicon Alves Dias, the work proposes an allegorical reading of the Brazilian and American people, as well as establishing a dialectic between the two eras. Also according to Dias, the parallel between the present and the future leads each character to reflect on the reality of their time. (Note: According to the authors of Furacão na Botocúndia, characters such as Evelyn Astor, Professor Benson, and the members of the "White Race Convention" are based on historical figures, including Jean-Jacob Astor (1763–1848); George Abbot; Robert Owen; and Calvin Coolidge.)

=== Alter-ego? ===
Authors such as Feres Júnior, Nascimento & Eisenberg 2013 present the "protagonist" of the work as being the "representative" of Lobato's "extreme views" – and therefore an "alter-ego". However, this idea is questioned in Santana-Dezmann 2021, noting that "[...] although the lines and ideas expressed by the characters were coined by the author, they do not necessarily represent what the author thinks." and that no character is consistently against the black population throughout the narrative, in addition to the fact that there are characters who oppose each other, with totally different ideas and worldviews, written by the same author, makes it impossible for the same author to defend all these views at the same time. For researcher Emerson Tin, while presenting the interpretations of Marcia Camargos, Vladimir Sacchetta and Marisa Lajolo, says that it would be too superficial and simplistic to focus on decontextualized passages from the novel to accuse it of being a racist work, Dias says that the use of allegories means that, in hasty readings, we end up missing the author's attempt to portray his time and society and Felipe Chamy says that the author is "diluted in various forms in the fictional spheres of this work." An example of the contradictions in the characters' feelings occurs in chapter XVIII, where President Kerlog recognizes Jim Roy's merits, but concludes: “I admire you as a man, Jim. I recognize you as a brother, and I feel your genius. But as a white man, I see you only as an enemy whom I must crush...”, embracing an irrational impulse, or as described by Santana-Dezmann, the “instinct of race”, denying the “superior and rational” position defended by the “representatives of white ethnicity”. Ultimately, the existence of these irrational impulses, according to Santana-Dezmann's, shows how pointless artificial selection and eugenic policies are in the narrative.

=== Language ===
"[...] Words don't matter, as I said. Only the idea counts."

— Professor Benson, in Monteiro Lobato, O Choque das Raças, Chapter V, page 44.

Santana-Dezmann 2021 begins the discussion on the language of the work with an example already seen in the opening of Chapter I, where two characters discuss human dishonesty and all the problems it causes, resulting in the exclamation: “[...] Sometimes I wonder what the world would be like if a wise eugenics combated dishonesty by eliminating all dishonest people. What a paradise!" The term "elimination", according to the researcher, while it may convey the idea of extermination, can also involve other ways of putting an end to dishonesty, such as access to education and a decent wage. As for the term "wise eugenics", the meaning continues to be "combating dishonesty". The researcher notes the difficulty critics have in noticing the different meanings of the same word, which ends up causing them to discard the first part of the work, due to the negative connotation the term has received from the non-specialized public, and that Lobato seeks to conceptualize how the same word can have both a specific and a generic meaning, depending on the reader's knowledge.

Afterward, the researcher explains why it is necessary to understand the internal context of the narrative and the external context of the moment in which the work was composed, and that this understanding is necessary to differentiate an adequate reading from an inadequate one. On the other hand, in Carlos Minchillo's view, the work is ambiguous and an example of the different ways in which any literary work can be read and interpreted. In Dias' view, the work contains "irony, criticism and concern for humanity and society", something that is often seen in Lobato's children's work and in José Wellington de Souza's view, the work has a fluid style, different from Lobato's previously published short stories.

In general, according to Santana-Dezmann, the work addresses the issues of "sign", "meaning" and "signifier" in Saussure's linguistics: the same word (or illustration) can have both a general and a specific meaning, and that there is no logical relationship between the two, and what matters in The Black President is the meaning that the words contain in each context. Santana-Dezmann also notes that terms that have fallen into disuse are given a negative connotation in the 21st century, and that a complete analysis needs to recover the meanings they had at the time the work was written. This discussion returns later, when Miss Jane and Ayrton Lobo use the terms "kinky hair" and "mulattas", which today can be seen as filled with prejudice, but which in 1926 were common terms – something that occurs in many works written until the end of the last century – as well as recalling the experimental nature of the language in the novel. However, even in the context of the novel, the characters limit their use of slangs, such as the fact that Dr. Benson was confused by the terms "piririca" and "bear grills seal". At another point, the concept of hatred is personified. At the end of the narrative, as a "moral of the story", Miss Jane advocates authenticity and simplicity when writing a narrative, which, according to Minchillo, echoes Lobato's literary ideas, and Dias describes it as a resource of metanarration.

In building suspense, researcher Felipe Chamy shows that the narrator-character uses a narrative that is close to the moment of the story, dosing the information and allowing the reader to discover new environments and new information together with the protagonist. Along these lines, within the narrative, Chamy explains that Miss Jane uses the same dosage techniques to make Ayrton Lobo curious about the progress of the narrative. Chamy also notes that Ayrton's first-person account also requires a certain amount of disbelief, as everything the reader receives is based on the narrator-character's understanding. Later, Chamy considers that the "prose is a bit sloppy", that the narrator suffers from "a limited fabulation" and without "any great virtue that imposes itself", or that the reader can notice.

== Themes ==
=== Metaphysics ===
Metaphysics, following Aristotle's definition, investigates reality beyond what the five senses can grasp, while in Kant's sense, it studies both the laws and constituent forms of reason, while grounding the speculation of realities beyond the five senses. This theme is present in the discussion between Dr. Benson and Ayrton Lobo seen below:

— Yes. Life on earth is a movement of vibration of the aether, of the atom, of whatever is "uno and primary", you see?

— I'm almost getting it. I once read a newspaper article in which a wise man proved that there is only force and matter, but that matter is force, so the two elements are one, just as the three of the Holy Trinity are also one, isn't that right?

— More or less. Names are beside the point. Force, aether, atom: arbitrary names for a single thing, which is the beginning, middle and end of everything. For convenience, I'll call this primary element ether. This ether vibrates and, depending on the degree or intensity of the vibration, it presents itself to us in forms. Life, stone, light, air, trees, fish, your person, the firm Sá, Pato & Cia: these are modalities of the vibration of the ether. All of this was, is, and will only ever be the aether.

— Ayrton Lobo and Professor Benson, in Monteiro Lobato, O Choque das Raças, Chapter V,

Aether, in reference to the element aether, is a way for Dr. Benson to present his view that life in the universe is composed of vibrations, something that, as researcher Santana-Dezmann notes, is similar to the String Theory formulated in 1960. Overall, Santana-Dezmann notes that the work is a "treatise on metaphysics" until the end of Chapter IV, with the science fiction beginning in Chapter V. One theme developed is how the future presented in the story is only a "possible future", as Dr. Benson explains that the more variables there are, the more difficult it is to predict the future:

Here, however, the elements are so simple that when the human brain writes down 2 + 2, it immediately sees the future 4. However, in a more complex case, where instead of 2 + 2 we have, for example, the Bastille, Louis 16, Danton, Robespierre, Marat, the climate of France, England's hatred beyond the English Channel, the Gallic heritage combined with the Roman heritage, a billion factors, in short, that made up the France of '89, although all this predetermined the four Napoleon, this future could not be predicted by any brain because of the weakness of the human brain.

— Monteiro Lobato, O Choque das Raças, Cap. V,

However, due to the impossibility of predicting the future, Dr. Benson says: “The future doesn't exist,” continued the wise man, “but I possess the means of producing the future moment I desire.” In other words, his time machine.

=== Speculative future ===
In the narrative, Dr. Benson's inventions unite the waves of the Aether to observe the future, with the help of a "cronizador", which allows you to select the point you want to study. To observe the future, the "porviroscope" is used, a kind of crystalline globe, described as: "[...] the apparatus that takes the anatomical section of the future, as Jane likes to say, and unfolds it into the infinite multiplicity of forms of future life, which are in latency within the frozen current."

Miss Jane, before Dr. Benson's death, becomes the second narrator of the story by telling what she saw in the "anatomical section of the future" and after his death she starts to tell what she discovered:

- In the year 3527, the furthest the invention can reach, the white ethnic group in Europe had disappeared, leaving only the descendants of the Mongols. Ayrton Lobo reacts negatively, but is calmed down by Miss Jane: "Everything that is has a reason to be, had to be, and everything that will be will have a reason to be and will have to be." (Note: In the view of researcher Ana Formighieri, Ayrton Lobo's reaction only represented the common sense of the time, while Miss Jane presented an advanced vision at a time when the region was basically made up of a white population.)
- In the year 2200, due to the popularization of the home office, a new type of "radio transport", which allows communication by "radiated messages", similar to the modern Internet, brought an end to transport vehicles. Or, as the story goes: "Each contributor to Remember would broadcast his article from his home at a certain time, and immediately his ideas would appear in bright print in the homes of his subscribers."
- At the same period, it will be possible to transmit sensations. As an example, Miss Jane uses the purchase of a cigar: instead of ordering it and having a delivery man bring it, it will be possible to smoke it from a distance with "radio sensation".
- In 2228, "anatomical splitting" became possible, which would allow different activities to be carried out with the right and left parts of the body. However, this operation had side effects. (Note: According to Santana-Dezmann, the fact that this "splitting" has negative effects follows the book's thesis that eugenics is negative.)
- At the same period, there were already "psychic" newspapers that connected the world of the dead with that of the living, and the dream theater for recording dreams.
- In this future it is already possible to hold elections remotely, which used to take 30 minutes, via "radio-transport".

After these examples, Miss. Jane chooses to tell what she calls the "drama of the clash of races" of the year 2228 in the United States, stimulating Ayrton Lobo to turn it into a novel, which, as Filipe Chamy recognizes, Ayrton embraces both as a way to reduce his inferiority complex and to win over Miss Jane's love interest, and Marisa Lajolo notes that this act reproduces the structure of Joaquim Manuel de Macedo's A Moreninha (1844).

=== Speculative past ===
In developing the basis of the Elvinist Party, Miss Jane introduces Miss Elvin, and her theory set out in "Symbiosis Unmasked", that the woman of the Homo sapiens species is actually a member of an underwater species, sabina mutans, stolen by Homo men, while the "original" women have become extinct. The success of her thesis led Miss Gloria Elvin to lead the female population in the electoral arena, with her party having 54 million female votes in the election of 2224, against 54 million votes divided between the two genders for the Black Association and, finally, 51 million for the Men's Party.

=== Scientific ethics ===
While the invention of the porviroscope is presented as a gigantic scientific breakthrough, Professor Benson refuses to present it to the public or gain any benefit from it, apart from earning the money necessary for his life and work. So, to prevent the invention from being abused and used as a weapon, he chooses to take the knowledge of its creation and operation to the grave. Ayrton Lobo doesn't even get to witness the "porviroscope", a machine that allows you to see into the future, working, and researcher Emerson Tin speculates whether the equipment's vision is reliable.

=== Black people ===
Returning to the origin of the American people, when the first mention is finally made of the black people, Ayrton Lobo notes that these people arrived by force, which Miss Jane considers "[...] the only initial mistake made in that happy composition." The researcher Santana-Dezmann, in her work, develops that this initial mistake, in this case, slavery in the United States and the kidnapping of human beings, as a human intervention, rather than a simple consensual migratory movement, was the mistake described by Miss Jane.

Exploring the United States of 2228, Miss Jane reveals that not only does the black population have a higher birth rate than the white population, but that they have equal access to the means of intellectual development, not forgetting to mention their high moral standards. In describing Jim Roy, or James Roy Wilde, Miss Jane first calls him "[...] a figure of exceptional stature: Jim Roy, the genial black man.", going on to describe him physically as having the "[...] athletic figure of the Senegalese of our times [...]" and that, as a way of presenting the population in general, his appearance was reminiscent of the Native Americans, who in this future were already extinct, as well as having whitish skin. Later, the work continues to highlight Jim Roy's leadership qualities, such as the fact that he brought the black population together around a single political party. The book notes that some black people also sought de-pigmentation, something seen as negative by the white population.

Jim Roy is also characterized as an obstinate and incorruptible man during his meeting with Miss Astor in Chap. XIII, and following Santana-Dezmann's analysis, all the positive characteristics attributed to Roy, who sees himself as a representative of black ethnicity and placed as opposed to white men, implicitly function as criticisms of the white male population. In Chap. XVI, in deciding to put his name forward as a candidate for the Black Association, Jim Roy recalls the entire past of his people in the United States, from slavery to abolition and the present moment, with Santana-Dezmann's analysis showing that in the narrative, members of the black population are victims of an unjust system, and that Roy's final decision is in the name of justice. Carlos Minchillo also recognizes that Jim Roy is treated positively. Formighieri notes that disregarding the political dispute, the work does not point out "any racial problem that would prevent Jim Roy from being a nation leader." The chapter where he decides to put his name in the race shows the author's awareness of the "evil exercised by the white against the black people."

=== Political power ===
In the future story, according to Santana-Dezmann, the black population's access to education and the increase in the birth rate created a scenario in which the political hegemony of the white population would be challenged, creating two distinct ideological currents: the "white solution", which aimed to expatriate the black population and "dump the hundred million black Americans in the Amazon valley"; and the "black solution", in Miss Jane's view "much more feasible", which was the division of the country, in which the South of the United States would be left to the black population and the northern region to the white population. Miss Jane describes the events of 2228 as the "year of tragedy", with Santana-Dezmann, in her analysis, noting the lack of attitudes that imply the demerit or disqualification of black characters – with criticism always falling on white characters.

With the arrival of the 2228 elections and the electoral success of the Elvinist Party, President Kerlog sought the support of the Black Association, receiving, as a condition for Jim Roy's support, that the law limiting the birth rate be eased, which, due to the political situation at the time, was accepted by the incumbent government. According to Formighieri, Kerlog sought out Roy because he recognized the possibility of an agreement with a male individual, something he did not believe was possible when dealing with Miss Astor. When Jim Roy and Miss Astor met, there were no demands from the leader of the Black Association, but Miss Astor argued that the white male population was the enemy of both the female and black populations. Also according to Formighieri, the interest shown by the characters was only that of obtaining or maintaining power, with no regard for ideas of social equality.

When Jim Roy, in the position of president-elect, fears the risk of a major conflict in his country, and goes to President Kerlog to discuss the situation, the question of power is still present, both in the recriminations about who would be responsible for the "state of war" and whether the incumbent president would tear up the Constitution by refusing to hand over the office to the president-elect. In the end, despite the apparent peace agreement, Kerlog warns that he will not accept Jim Roy's command, which, according to Santana-Dezmann's analysis, leads to the deconstruction of the character of the "pioneers" and the white population, when Kerlog embraces his irrationality by standing up to Jim Roy, saying that "Blood does not reason...'" and that he will prefer to destroy his country to avoid leaving power in the hands of the black population, despite recognizing the genius in his opponent. With this reaction, Jim Roy decided to split the country in two. Kerlog recognizes the justice of this decision and the nobility of Roy's ideals, even comparing him to Abraham Lincoln, but announces that war between them was inevitable. Later, Kerlog recognized in Jim Roy "'...a patriot's noble soul, capable of the supreme heroism of sacrificing himself for America'".

With the election of Jim Roy, the incumbent government holds the "White Race Convention" where, over the course of four chapters, they discuss whether they should respect the Constitution and swear in the president-elect, or put the "Leland motion" into action, which, in Santana-Dezmann's analysis, is responsible for turning the narrative into a dystopia, by demonstrating the cruelty resulting from eugenics policies (Note: In her article, Santana-Dezmann describes the dystopian part of these lines: since more than a century of "eugenic policies" have resulted in a population incapable of lying or breaking the law, the leaders of the white population, such as the incumbent president, instead of attacking the Constitution, they call for genocide. In other words: "[...] the result of the genetic and moral improvement provided by the application of eugenic methods is the worst possible: in order not to make a mistake like lying or breaking a law, supposedly perfect people do something extremely worse." And focusing on the downside of a perfect-looking society is precisely the role of a dystopia.) and Marisa Lajolo compares this motion to the Holocaust. (Note: Formighieri points out that the work was written before World War II, so the observations contained in the fiction did not have the same meaning as the Nazi actions. Aiex notes that the segregationist views expressed by characters like Miss Jane, despite being a work written before the rise of Nazism, were already in vogue, and that Miss Jane would represent the American perspective on the racial issue, while Ayrton Lobo would represent the Brazilian perspective.) Lajolo says that the protagonist, Ayrton Lobo, shows a "well-mannered" horror, which, in her view, causes discomfort, and in Carlos Minchillo's vision, Miss Jane reports the events of the future "without astonishment".

The theme returns after the establishment of the "Omega rays" companies that straightened frizzy hair, with great popular participation. Jim Roy went through the process, which impacted his physical and mental vigor. This comes to a culmination when President Kerlog visits him, emotionally impacted by his actions, even as he embraces his "role" as a representative of white ethnicity, breaking the ultimate news: Omega rays have the side effect of sterilization. Jim Roy is finally found dead and Kerlog is re-elected. (Note: According to Formighieri, the chapter in which Jim Roy learns of the blow he has suffered is such a tragedy that it would be reasonable to deny that Lobato was defending the type of eugenics discussed in the book.) With his re-election, the meaning of the Leland motion was revealed by Kerlog in his speech, which was received by the population with astonishment: the criminalization of artificial whitening and the authorization of the government to enforce the law – which was accomplished through the support of the Omega rays.

=== Eugenics ===
According to Santana-Dezmann, the term "eugenics" takes on different meanings throughout the narrative. At the beginning of the novel, it represented the narrator's frustration at human dishonesty and how he would like to change it. When Miss Jane goes on to tell of visions of the future, she uses this term in a regression to the formation of the United States, but in a reference to the "character" of the first settlers, when she states that: “The May flower people, who were they? Men of such temperament, such Shakespearean characters that between abjuring their convictions and emigrating to the desert, to the empty, wild land where everything was inhospitable and harsh, they didn't waver for a second." (Note: According to Ana Formighieri, this romanticized view of the colonization of the United States must have its origins both in the possible target audience and in the works of the early 1900s that dealt with this historical moment positively and that the novel's stances were aimed at valuing the racial group that made up the country.) but that this formation, according to Miss Jane, included the best representatives of both ethnic groups. The book focuses solely on the black and white ethnic groups, because by the year 2228, the native peoples had already become extinct. (Note: The choice to consider the native peoples as extinct in this future world, according to Santana-Dezmann, may be due to an attempt by the author to simplify in order to focus only on the main dispute.) Miss Jane's focus in using the term eugenics, according to Santana-Dezmann's, remains on the personality and character of the people who came to make up the USA, describing it as a kind of "non-Darwinian natural selection" of those who would go on to build the country.

In the discussion about miscegenation in Chap. X, as we see in the topic below, after Miss Jane presents her thesis that the division of the two ethnic groups was something positive for both, we have the following dialog:

— But that's horrible," I exclaimed in disgust. Miss Jane, an angel of goodness, defends evil...

For the third time, the girl smiled in a way that reminded me of her father.

— There is no evil or good in the play of cosmic forces. Hatred creates as many wonders as love. Love killed the possibility of supreme biological expression in Brazil. Hatred created in America the glory of human eugenics...

— Ayrton Lobo and Miss Jane, in Monteiro Lobato, O Choque das Raças, Chap. 10, Page 115

In her analysis, Santana-Dezmann notes that in this third use of the term "eugenics", it has the meaning of preserving the main characteristics of the two ethnic groups and that the term cannot be understood in the sense of extermination, because at this point in history, 50% of the American population was black. From Chap. XIX onwards, the term takes on its fourth meaning, in the context of the fictional Owen's Law, originally presented in Chap. XI, when they discuss the development of the American population and the feeling of primacy felt by the white population, which, according to Santana-Dezmann's analysis, is neither condemned nor exalted. Because of this feeling of primacy, the white population began to control the birth rate, with a law that applied to both ethnicities, because the government and its laws applied to everyone, but even so, there was an increase in the birth rate of the black population. Santana-Dezmann's conclusion at the time was that even with these laws, it was the members of the black population who had certain superior physical and moral characteristics compared to the white population. Formighieri also notes that despite these "purification" laws, the country continued to suffer from social conflicts.

In this fictional context, to avoid overpopulation, we see the return of the ideas of Francis Galton (1822–1911), who formalized Eugenics based on two principles: that the environment does not influence the formation of characteristics (going against the Positivism of Auguste Comte [1798–1857]) and that moral, intellectual and general abilities are hereditary. Outside of fiction, European countries such as Sweden have developed public policies based on these ideas. In the fictional context, it is only at this point in Chapter XI that the term takes on its popularly recognized meaning and, alongside the other controls, creates the apparent "utopia" that is challenged throughout the narrative – which, in Santana-Dezmann's view, is a critique of these ideas. Many critics accuse the fact that Lobato knew and read Galton's treatises as evidence of his support, while Santana-Dezmann notes that he also read Auguste Comte's treatises, an influence on the characterization of Jeca Tatu, which were the opposite of eugenic ideas.

At the point where Miss Jane positively reports the euthanasia of disabled children, or the "resurgence of wise Spartan law", the protagonist of the narrative, Ayrton Lobo, is horrified. One action of Owen's Law in the fictional context was to create a city, Erópolis, "erected in the most beautiful corner of the Adirondacks", a sort of "City of Love", to encourage reproduction among both black and white individuals.

In the conclusion of her analysis, Santana-Dezmann argues that the actions of a people who have undergone artificial selection, and who would therefore be incapable of breaking the law (in this case, the Constitution), but who nevertheless opted for the sterilization of their people, ends up presenting the narrative as a critique against the eugenic policies practiced in various countries around the world in 1926, without, therefore, presenting an apology for the extermination of the black population. On the other hand, José Wellington de Souza believes that there was a possible "enchantment" on the part of the author with the idea of negative eugenics, (Note: The newspaper A Manhã promoted the work as "...an ode to eugenics, to Spartan laws revived in America...".) a view similar to that of the authors of "Furacão na Botocúndia", who acknowledge the work as “frankly eugenicist,” but note the author’s contradictions in his revival of African-derived elements in his children’s literature, or his condemnation of slavery in the short story “Negrinha.” Ayrton Lobo, being in favor of miscegenation, is shocked by the outcome.

=== Contact between fiction and reality ===
In the fictional story, after the novelty of Jim Roy's election diminished in the public's view, the media began to promote the treatment of an "Omega wave", from the Dudley Uncurling Company, which could straighten frizzy hair – something that, according to Santana-Dezmann's analysis, turned out to be very cruel. As a possible point of contact between fiction and reality, according to Santana-Dezmann's research, in the USA at the beginning of the 20th century, the products of Madam C. J. Walker (1867–1919) were sold, such as the Wonderful Hair Grower ointment, which both stimulated growth and softened frizzy hair, with the side effect of straightening it.

By exploring C. J. Walker's biography, it is possible to follow the recrimination she suffered for both her color and her hair, even among the black population and that, as Nannie Helen Burroughs criticized, many black men preferred to marry white women because of their color, rather than choosing for their character. According to A'Lelia Bundles, great-great-granddaughter of C. J. Walker, black women were under so much psychological and emotional pressure to approximate the features of white women, that many businesses owned by white owners exploited the insecurity of segments of the African-American population with their hair texture.

Despite this, C. J. Walker and Annie Malone, with whom C. J Walker was partner, compared themselves to sellers such as the Johnson Manufacturing Company among others, and the fact that they demonstrated their products on their own contributed to their success. In life, she denied her relationship with the idea of hair straightening and in her death, W. E. B. Du Bois aimed to correct the false image created by the media and highlight Madam Walker's dedication to defending the rights of black people.

In another point of contact, the fictional work tells of the "depigmentizer", and in reality, since the end of the 19th century, products that promised to lighten the skin were sold in the United States, as well as being promoted in newspapers aimed at the black population. In conclusion, according to Santana-Dezmann, the fiction set in 2228 and the USA up to 1926 shared several similarities, including how the narrative reproduces the prejudice against curly hair and its straightening techniques, as observed in the American media between the 19th and 20th centuries. According to Dias, this part of the work also functions as a critique of customs and society's fads.

=== Miscegenation ===
In the discussion about miscegenation or lack of it in the formation of Brazil and the United States and how the dispute between the two ethnic groups could have been resolved, Miss Jane and Ayrton Lobo present divergent views: Ayrton Lobo defends miscegenation in the style carried out in Brazil, while Miss Jane argues that this would destroy the best characteristics of both ethnicities, saying that "Our solution was mediocre. It ruined the two races by merging them. The black man lost his admirable physical qualities of savagery and the white man suffered the inevitable depression of character, consequent on all crossbreeding between disparate races." This surprises the protagonist, Ayrton Lobo, because in his view, this division meant that the two ethnic groups developed "separated by a barrier of hatred".

The researcher Santana-Dezmann, in her analysis of the questions in the paragraph above, emphasizes that Miss Jane had attributed certain characteristics to the population of the USA at the beginning of its history and that the plural term Ruined both races [...] excludes any attack on a specific ethnic group. After Ayrton Lobo's surprise, Miss Jane made her second defense: "'This hatred, or rather this pride, [...] was the most fruitful of prophylactics. It prevented one race from becoming denatured, decrystallized the other, and kept both in an absolute state of purity. This pride was the creator of the most beautiful phenomenon of ethnic outbreak that I have seen in my cuts of the future.'" In her analysis, Santana-Dezmann notes that the "purity" described by Miss Jane was the "original state" of both ethnic groups at the time of colonization. The researcher also considers the divergence in both characters to be remarkable, because while Ayrton Lobo interprets the division as creating a barrier of hatred, Miss Jane considers it a "pride" of both ethnicities – the only point on which they disagree, because the idea of separation still revolts Ayrton Lobo. Santana-Dezmann also notes the use of the adjective "beautiful" when Miss Jane describes the proliferation of the two ethnic groups across the USA. Formighieri also notes the divergence in the thoughts of each character and considers the dialog to be a way for the author to expose a reflection of that historical moment.

=== Feminism ===
The feminist movement is referred to in Chapter XII in a critical reference to certain groups that sought to masculinize women. Later, Miss Astor describes the male population as the enemy of the female population. When the Black Association won the 2228 elections, members of the Elvinist Party abandoned their positions to form the opposition alongside the Men's Party.

=== Cinema ===
The work, according to Minchillo, refers to the movie The Sea Beast, starring John Barrymore, whose last scene inspires the final chapter. According to the researcher, the novel in the movie has a similar symmetrical structure to the book, indicating a possible cinematic influence on Monteiro Lobato's text.

== Writing and publication ==
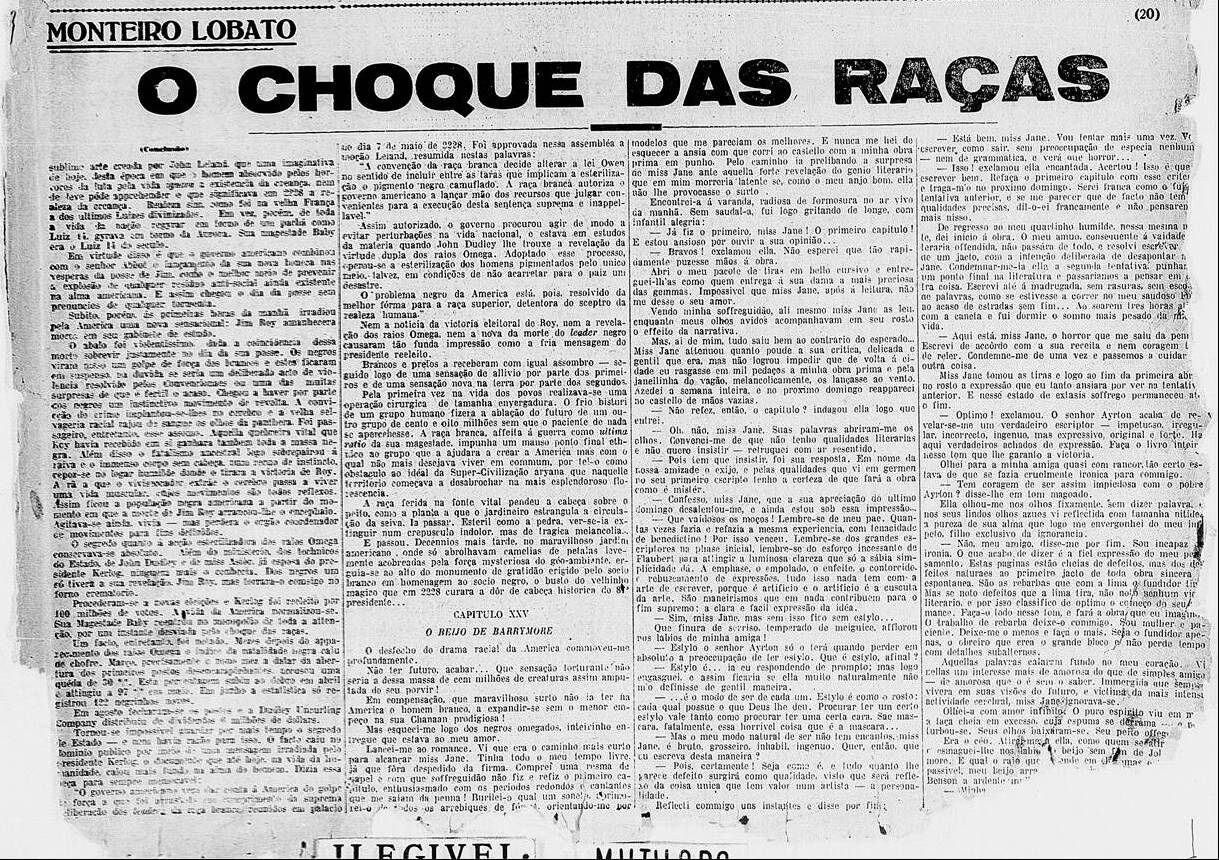
Final but mutilated part of The Clash of the Races, as published on October 1, 1926.

In the period before writing "The Black President", according to researcher Filipe Chamy, Lobato was already a respected art critic, had published O Saci-Pererê: Resultado de um Inquérito (1918), some children's works and collections such as Urupês (1918), considered by João Luís Ceccantini to be "the first Brazilian best-seller".

"The Black President", considered a dystopia by Santana-Dezmann because, although it presents an apparently perfect future, it turns out to be negative at the end. It was published in the newspaper A Manhã, where Lobato worked, between September 5 and October 1, 1926, and printed as a book in December 1926. Preceding works such as Aldous Huxley's Brave New World (1932); George Orwell's 1984 (1949); and Ray Bradbury's Fahrenheit 451 (1953); but following the publication of Yevgeny Zamyatin's We in 1924 in a New York newspaper, The Black President was the second dystopia made public, and the first published as a book. (Note: Carlos Minchillo sees the work as a "utopia", but recognizes that the presence of satire and irony also allows it to be read as a "dystopia". Aiex recognizes only Professor Benson's residence as being a utopian area.) However, Lobato had already wanted to write science fiction since 1905:

I've been thinking about things along the lines of Wells, involving imagination, fantasy, and glimpses of the future – not Jules Verne's near future, of a mere 50 years from now, but a future of a thousand years. I'm going to sow these ideas in my mind now and let them develop freely for ten or twenty years – and then I'll just harvest, if the crop survives until then. If the soil in my mental garden isn't conducive to these little seeds, then I'm not destined to be 'H. G. Wells of Taubaté', and that's that. Either one day I give something good that smash the natives, or I don't give anything at all. To be a Garcia Redondo, what a square and lousy thing to do!

— Monteiro Lobato, 17 December 1905, A Barca de Gleyre – 1º Tomo,

As early as 1926, inspired by the topics under discussion at the time, such as negative eugenics and the hair care industry, discussed below, Lobato told Godofredo Rangel, in a letter dated July 8, 1926, with certain details different from the final version, that he was already developing the idea of an "American novel" with sales potential in the United States and that he already had a translator to support him. According to researcher Santana Dezmann, Lobato was aware of the ethnic discussions taking place in the United States through reading imported newspapers and contact with Americans and, considering the fame of H.G. Wells, (Note: Researcher Emerson Tin speculates that The Time Machine also influenced Lobato's novel, as well as noting that the author was a voracious reader, and translator, of Wells. Among various authors, Lobato translated, according to Chamy, at least 50 works from English into Portuguese.) he believed that following the British author's style and thematizing US social issues would guarantee his publishing success. With certain issues, such as translation, already resolved, Lobato wrote his work in three weeks.

In a letter dated February 7, 1927, to Godofredo Rangel, despite referring to the publication of the last part of the work in the newspaper A Manhã, which had taken place in October 1926, Lobato said that he would send a copy of his work to his friend for his opinion and presented his plans to publish it as a book in Brazil. According to researcher Santana-Dezmann, the letter was written on October 1, 1926. With this settled, the work was published by the newly-created Companhia Editora Nacional in December 1926 in São Paulo, as seen in a letter written at Christmas 1926.

=== Writing development ===
In a letter dated July 8, 1926, to Godofredo Rangel, Monteiro Lobato described his plans:

Rio, 8 July 1926

Rangel

I don't know if I've told you about the arrival of the articles. I've also started reading the book you sent me by W. Brandão. It's really very interesting and intriguing. There are some delightful things to observe and to express. Too bad it's written in that new Portuguese orthography.

Do you know what I've been working on? A master idea! An American novel, in other words, publishable in the United States. I've already started and it's going fast. Kind of like Wells, with a look into the future. It will focus on the clash between the black and white races, when the former, whose proliferation rate is higher, catches up with the whites and beats them at the polls, electing a black president! Tremendous things happen, but in the end the white man's intelligence won. Using the N-rays invented by Professor Brown, he manages to sterilize blacks without them noticing.

I already have a good translator, Stuart, and an agent in New York who is enthusiastic about the plan and has a good percentage in the business. Imagine if I get a bestseller! A million copies...

Do you know the Tarzan series? It's funny and very childish. It sells millions. I think I can write for the United States because of my penchant for writing for children. I think Americans are childish in a healthy way.

LOBATO

— Monteiro Lobato, A Barca de Gleyre – 2º Tomo,

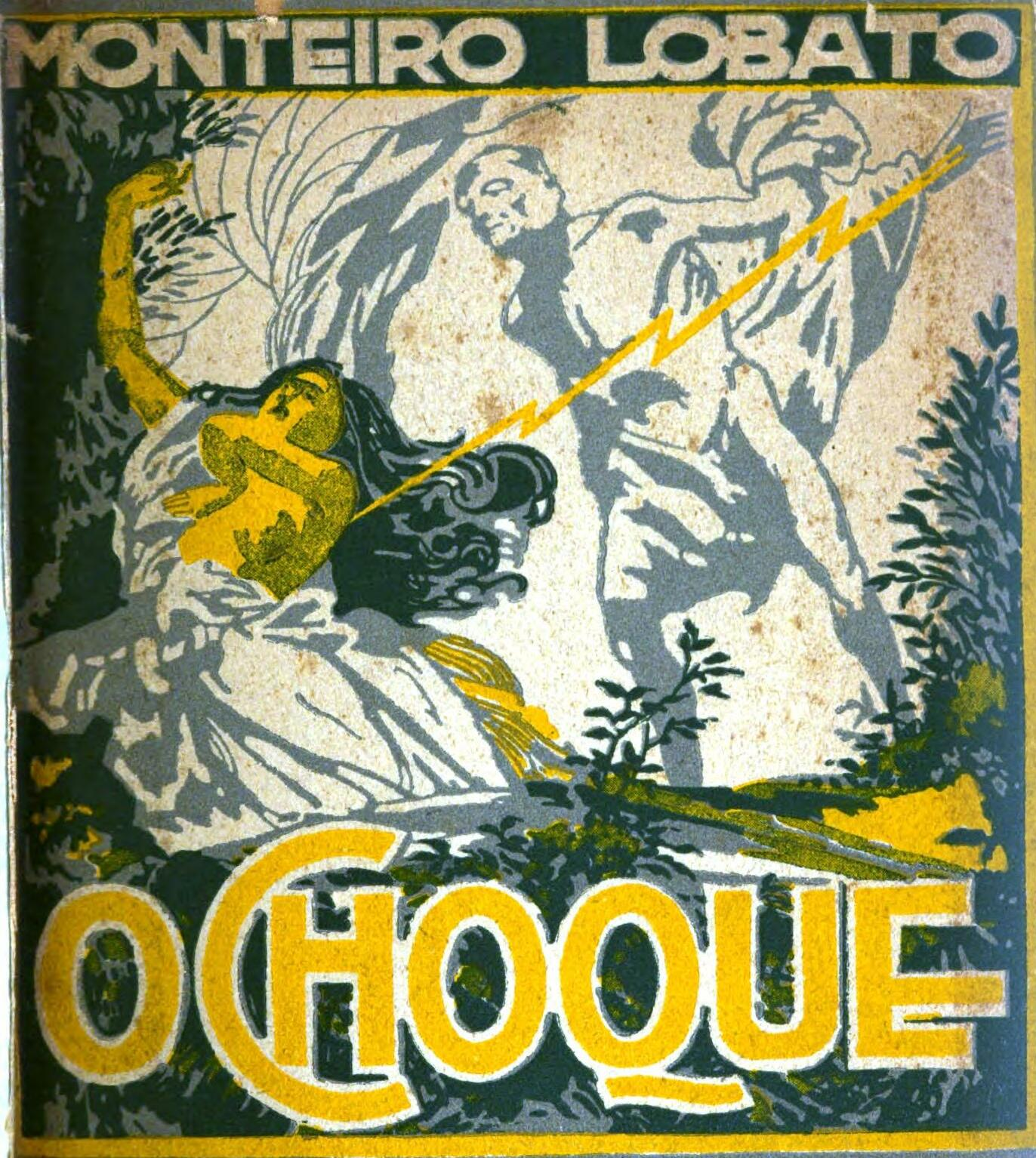
Detail of the first edition illustration.

Santana-Dezmann, in his analysis, demonstrates the differences between the text reported in the letter above and the version published in the book, based on what was published in the newspaper A Manhã: The "N rays" become the "Omega rays"; Dr. Brown becomes John Dudley; and finally, the "intelligence of the white man" becomes "cleverness", with a negative connotation, because, according to the analysis, in literature this term becomes negative when characters characterized in this way are presented as despicable, something that has been part of Western literature since the short story Roman de Renart. According to Carlos Minchillo, the newspaper version and the book version also contain several differences, either to make it easier to read or, in his view, to justify the actions of the white characters. The 1945 edition, still according to Minchillo, also had new editions that avoided ambiguity or for ideological reasons, especially, according to the researcher, in the light of the Second World War.

In an ad published on March 14, 1927, in Time magazine, Jim Roy is described by Lobato as the hero of the narrative. As for the title, the author had doubts, even considering the names "The Blond Kingdom"; "The Clash of the Races"; or "The Black President", which, according to Carlos Minchillo, would give the reader different views of the work, respectively: a utopian view; a distanced view; or the story of the rise of a black leader, and this could indicate the meaning of the illustration in the first edition, which privileges the subplot of the dispute between men and women, avoiding, according to the researcher, the ethnic reference.

=== Critical reception ===
20th century

In a review published in "A Manhã" on October 19, 1926, Faria Neves Sobrinho was disappointed with the novel, saying: "...the novel, whose style is almost always loose, colorless and unbalanced, without the vigor that portrays and characterizes the author of “Urupês”, is deplorably unpatriotic and disastrously illogical in certain episodes.” For his turn, Ribeiro Couto, in a review on July 20, 1927, was more positive, noting the "verisimilitude of the fantastic'", the future applications of radio and the possibility of an international audience being interested in the translations.

According to researcher Denise Maria de Paiva Bertolucci, the unprecedented nature of the fiction genre that Lobato chose explains why his colleagues at the newspaper didn't approve of him unanimously. According to Carlos Minchillo, six reviews consulted in his research were written on the basis of the publisher's promotional material, due to the recurrence of phrases like "as stated by the publishers" and references to passages that do not appear in the printed version, and how the first critical texts saw the work as having an educational quality, with Nestor Vítor considering the work to be "anticolonialist", because the USA "floods our cinemas [...] that are Americanizing us" and that Lobato's strategy would be a kind of reverse engineering. Silveira Bueno, on the other hand, was bothered by the voluntary mischaracterization of the black population.

The work was only reissued in 1945, due to "the author's lack of interest", as published in the edition, something, according to Carlos Minchillo, that was rare in Monteiro Lobato's career. It reached 13 editions in 1979. As for critical perception: in the 1940s, Amadeu Amaral Jr. considered the work to be the author's "only failure", something repeated by Edgard Cavalheiro in the following decade; in the 1960s, Cassiano Nunes considered it to be "the most rushed, the most conventional, in short, the worst of his works". From this point on, critics began to interpret the work as "prejudiced, racist and sexist", such as André Carneiro in his work "Introdução ao estudo da science-fiction" (Introduction to the study of science-fiction), who recognized its unprecedented nature, but considered it weak and "against the black race", with the last edition of this book until 2010 being published in 1967. In 1965, Timothy Brown Jr. stated: "The novel is a showcase for Lobato. It has something of everything, with most of the characteristics of his writing: satire, humor, imagination, and ideas...even a description of the Brazilian forest."

In the 1970s, Paulo Dantas, in "A Presença de Lobato" (1973), says, assuming the writer's voice, that the work was written in "praise of blackness". In 1996, Nola Kortner Aiex said that the limitation of the story within a story format used by the narrative would be the fact that the reader only briefly visits the future, creating a "static narrative." However, the text has a natural, simple, yet vivid conversational writing style, unlike the stylization usually seen in science fiction.

21st century

With the election of Barack Obama in 2008, Editora Globo reissued the book with the slogan "any resemblance to real events is purely coincidental". Between March and September of that year, 6,000 copies were sold. Dias notes that the US elections raised similar questions to those in the novel. A decade later, in 2019, Marisa Lajolo and Lilia Schwarcz, in the work "Reinações de Monteiro Lobato", assuming the author's voice, state that "the novel could provoke and feed prejudice, encourage violence, defend racist values and attitudes. (...) My American novel was really inappropriate. A disaster. There are plenty of reasons to be controversial'".

== Translations ==
=== 1927 US failed publishing attempt ===
Lobato, an author who was already published in Syria, Germany, France, Argentina and Spain, already had contact with the translator Aubrey Stuart and an editor in New York, according to Santana Dezmann, probably Alfred A. Knopf, connected to Isaac Goldberg. Goldberg, the writer and translator responsible for translating his works into English, such as the collection Brazilian tales, had already been introducing Monteiro Lobato to the American public since 1924, as in the translation of Brazilian Short Stories in 1925, with three short stories from Urupês. As for the translator Aubrey Stuart, Lobato had already known him since 1925. Little is known about him, but he was responsible for the translation of How Henry Ford is regarded in Brazil and was someone who, according to researcher Santana-Dezmann, Lobato found easy to meet to discuss the translation process. According to Carlos Minchillo, after the bankruptcy of the Monteiro Lobato & Cia. publishing house, Lobato wanted to write for the American public, hoping to make a profit of two million dollars, (Note: A letter from Monteiro Lobato, presented by Emerson Tin, indicates that the novel was commissioned by a US publisher.) something that Santana-Dezmann considers to be a mistake or exaggeration on the part of Monteiro Lobato, or whoever transcribed the letter, since not even the bestseller Nigger Heaven achieved such a high profit. In the context of this letter to Gastão Cruls, described below, it was written when Lobato already knew that his only chance was to publish the book in England and then see it smuggled into the United States.

In a letter dated December 1926, Lobato said that the translation would take a long time to complete, expecting it to be finished by the end of January 1927, and that the financial results would only come in the second half of the year. Months later, in a letter to Rangel dated March 23, 1927, Lobato told of his preparations to move to the United States, where he would take up the post of commercial attaché and hoped to publish the translation of his book, as well as presenting his plans to create the publishing house Tupy Publishing Co. The book was initially expected to be published in the US in March 1927, as "Jim Roy, The Black President" according to the Diário da Noite of January 4, 1927, or, according to the Time ad of March 14, 1927, The Clash of the Races, or the Negro President. On April 22, 1927, also in a letter to Rangel, Lobato indicated that his departure would take place on May 25 and that United Press had sent a telegram about the work to the American media. The news was reproduced in newspapers such as the Dayton Daily News on February 27, 1927; the Canadian newspaper The Province on February 28, 1927; The Chillicothe Constitution-Tribune on March 9, 1927; and Time on March 14, 1927.

Already in New York, living in Jackson Heights, on August 17, 1927, Lobato corresponded again with Rangel and, among other things, presented his plans to leave the post of commercial attaché after two years, when he would focus on Tupy Publishing, as well as reinvesting, with interest, 700 dollars a month of his salary in "iron and oil for Brazil". However, in the next letter, dated September 5, Lobato announced that his novel had failed to find a publisher, because "They find it offensive to American dignity" and that, therefore, the Tupy Company had failed, but Goldberg would keep the text to try to do something with it. In a bitter tone, according to Santana-Dezmann, he recognizes that he came too inexperienced and says that he should have come "'in the days when they lynched black people'".

When analyzing the reason Lobato gives in the fifth paragraph of his letter for the failure of his publication, of "...admitting that after so many centuries of moral progress this people might, collectively, commit (Note: Some reproductions mistakenly use the term combater (combat) instead of cometer (commit).) in cold blood the beautiful crime I have suggested", Santana-Dezmann has doubts, due to the violence suffered by the black population in the US and how the situation worsened until the 1960s and the protests of Martin Luther King Jr., and that the message of the text in the researcher's view, "we are all vibrations of the Aether", would no longer be relevant according to the editors.

A letter of refusal that Lobato received, written by William David Ball, (Note: The full letter is available at Santana-Dezmann 2022, pp. 64–65) from the Palmer Literary Agency in Hollywood, recognizes the qualities of the narrative and the deference given to Jim Roy, but that the subject would be a "particularly difficult to present in this country for it is likely to awaken the bitterest kind of partisanship..." and that the text should move away from the "black question" to possibly focus on the dispute between genders or the invasion of a foreign ethnic group, but that the way it was, by "suggesting" the extermination of the black population, something that according to researcher Santana-Dezmann, the novel criticizes, the work would not be accepted by any publisher and would be poorly received by black readers. In the end, Ball suggests that the text be kept and reworked based on what was in vogue in the country, and that he would await future work by the author. According to Minchillo, criticisms such as Ball's did not appear in the first reviews of the novel in the Brazilian media.

==== Harlem Renaissance ====
At that moment in American history, the Harlem Renaissance was taking place, which saw a huge cultural participation by the black population in the United States. One of its main participants, A'Lelia Walker (1885–1931), daughter of Madam C. J. Walker, became the matron of the arts and literature, enabling an unprecedented participation of the black population in the artistic and literary world, something unimaginable until then. Also present in this historical environment was Carl van Vechten (1880–1964), a colleague of Goldberg's, a friend of Knopf's since at least 1916 and A'Lelia Walker's best friend.

Carl Van Vechten, responsible for popularizing several black authors during the Harlem Renaissance, published in August 1926 the work Nigger Heaven, a colloquial and offensive term used by some white people about the seats in theaters where blacks could not sit together with whites. Even his father, the Rotarian Charles Duane Van Vechten, objected to the stronger terms of a work with many such terms, as well as sarcastic and ironic language, created within the context of the inhabitants of Harlem, not forgetting to mention the characteristic dialect of the region. Despite this, as well as dealing with the "black question", the work was published by Alfred A. Knopf, and was not well received by part of the black public. However, the first edition, with 16,000 copies, sold out and soon three new editions were printed, making the work the first best-seller in US literary history.

In this context, according to Santana-Dezmann, the connection between Carl Van Vechten, Knopf and the arts mecena A'Lelia Walker, made the publication of The Black President, which contained a theme and vocabulary similar to Nigger Heaven, economically unfeasible, as it could be seen as an advertisement against hair straightening and A'Lelia Walker's products. Still according to the researcher, Lobato, who at that time had already attacked slavery in Brazil in short stories such as Negrinha from 1920 (Note: For an analysis of the short story "Negrinha" and its comparison with The Black President, read Formighieri 2017, pp. 89–97, 114–115) and the 1921 Os Negros, wrote a novel to defend the black population, but arrived in the U.S. within the Harlem Renaissance, resulting in the letter of September 5, 1927, where he acknowledges that he arrived in the U.S. "green, inexperienced, without the context of what was happening in the country and that the "'I should have come in the days when they lynched black people" would be a reference to when the message of his book, according to Santana-Dezmann, to appreciate our natural characteristics, would have been accepted and would not have clashed with commercial interests. Santana-Dezmann notes that this sentence, presented in a decontextualized way without the letter in its entirety, is used to validate the thesis that the work would be so racist as to be able to scandalize US publishers, when in reality, according to her research, the impediment to publication was purely commercial.

Analyzing the whole passage, "I was wrong to come here so green. I should have come in the days when they lynched black people." and the classically attributed interpretation, Santana-Dezmann notes that it is problematic. "Green" would have to be replaced by "late", but in the context "green" has an opposite meaning to "late", so it should be replaced by "early", resulting in an internal incoherence. In other words, according to the analysis, although the sentence is in the same paragraph, it deals with two different issues: Lobato's ignorance of the context of the Harlem Renaissance; and how the final message of the book, which could have been useful in the past, did not find space in the new financial context. As for the "beautiful crime", it would have the meaning of "well-planned", without a complimentary connotation. However, the researcher recognizes that the adverbial adjunct of time represented by the second part of the sentence presented at the beginning of the paragraph reveals, due to the exaggerated sarcasm, a "high level of bad taste" and that Lobato must have recognized this when he removed the letter from the following editions of "A Barca de Gleyre".

A year before the letter described above, the newspaper A Manhã, on September 5, 1926, published a sensationalist report, according to Santana-Dezmann, indicating that the novel might not be published in the US, showing that Lobato had only become aware of this possibility when he had finished his novel. Also according to the researcher, A'Lelia Walker, in that context, would never allow the work to be published for the reasons mentioned earlier. In the same vein, the researcher says that "'They find it offensive to American dignity...'" was just an excuse by the editors not to admit the commercial motives that were at stake. Goldberg kept the text and, according to Santana-Dezmann, proposed publishing the book outside the US so that it could enter the country through the "back door" as a censored work. According to Chamy, there is no further information about Aubrey Stuart's translation or his whereabouts.

In a letter to Gastão Cruls dated December 10, 1927, Lobato once again mentioned the Tupy Company and considered Cruls' book "Elza e Helena" to be worthy of being published by Tupy. In the same letter, Lobato once again mentions The Black President and the possibility of profit due to a scandal, saying that it had been turned down by "five conservative publishers and friends of well-behaved works'", and that one editor had not only been excited by the work, but wanted him to increase the tone, and Lobato was even considering a chapter on the "war which resulted in the conquest by the United States of Mexico and all this Spanish infection of Central America'". His publisher was betting on a police ban and that the book would enter the country through England. According to researcher Santana-Dezmann, Lobato didn't go ahead with this plan and gave up on setting up his publishing house, as he realized that he would never be able to do anything without A'Lelia's support.

In a letter dated October 2, 1928, to his friend Yaynha, now living on Broadway and 12 blocks away from A'Lelia Walker's Dark Tower, Lobato once again talks about his novel: "The curious thing is that this book has been translated into French and is being published in parts by a French magazine. But it's no good for America, I'm the first to agree. It needs a serious overhaul, which I've never bothered to do for lack of enthusiasm. I don't know how to work like that". The following year, in a letter dated July 25, 1929, to Anísio Teixeira, Lobato already indicated his suspicion that he would soon have to return to Brazil, which happened in 1931, both because of the damage caused by the Crisis of 1929 and because he lost his position as commercial attaché after the deposition of Washington Luís. On his return, Lobato began to put his new projects into practice. At another point, Lobato comments on his work: "I belong to the unfortunate class of the untranslatable. My Clash failed for this reason. It came out in English as something incomprehensible." In spite of everything, Lobato would return to the theme of time travel in his children's work, in books such as The Minotaur and The Twelve Labours of Hercules, which rely on the magical element of pirlimpimpim powder for a physical return to the past, unlike the porviroscope, which only allowed a glimpse of another era.

Before he died, Lobato made this reference to his work: "'I have nothing to change in The Clash of the Races. The America I painted there is absolutely in line with the America I went to find'." Concluding her arguments, Santana-Dezmann describes that the America Lobato found was one that was developing rapidly; that respected the Constitution; where blacks straightened their frizzy hair and used skin-lightening products; where despite the two ethnic groups interacting, racial segregation persisted; a country built by two ethnic groups, but where blacks were prevented from attaining political power. In other words, a country where the "black question" not only predominated, but would become more acute over time. In her last word about the "alter-ego": the author's voice would be the reader's conscience about right and wrong. In another view, Marisa Lajolo considers the work to be a metaphor for the deculturation of an ethnic group; and Carlos Minchillo believes that Miss Jane "naturalizes" the actions of white leaders and that the author is counting on the "complicity of his reader".

Continuing with the academic interpretations, Marcia Camargos and Vladimir Sacchetta consider the novel to be "a metaphor about segregation and acculturation"; while Dias interprets that the work "...portrays the true essence of the man who seeks power in any way and under any circumstances", and that in his analysis it is possible to draw comparisons with the concerns of the time and those of today, making the novel demonstrate its value, with a social role. Ana Formighieri, on the other hand, sees in the work the possibility of observing the "questionings, feelings, contradictory emotions that permeated the subjects of the time", as well as questioning the effectiveness of the Eugenist theory and the whole thesis of the relegation of the black ethnic group in relation to the white one, and that the central issue of the work is the struggle for power. For José Wellington de Souza, Lobato would have bet on the popularity of Mendell's eugenicist theories and made an "apology for negative eugenics".

Thinking only of the structure, Filipe Chamy considers the work to be one of Lobato's "less cohesive fictions, with expository and unnatural dialogues", but he believes that it "legitimately addresses the troubled ethnic separation of the world's populations; the political opportunism that aims to segregate peoples and oppose nations; the prejudice that, born of centuries of uneven coexistence between ethnicities, would even tend to be exponentially catastrophic at some point", being accurate on a literary level.

==== Modern release ====
In 2022, Ana Lessa-Schmidt, responsible for translating works by Mário de Andrade, Machado de Assis and João do Rio, translated Lobato's work as "The Clash of the Races" by the New London Librarium and with an introduction by Vanete Santana-Dezmann. According to Brazilian Times, the translation "...captures Lobato's relatively simple syntax while retaining the complexities of his thoughts." In previous years, Alexandra Montague and Luciano Tosta made a translation of the book, but it was unsuccessful in being published for similar reasons to the 1927 attempt.

=== French language translation ===
According to Vanessa Gomes Franca's research, Lobato was one of the most translated authors in France in the 1920s and 1930s. The French public preferred regionalist writers to modernists, and Oswald de Andrade, realizing this, began to promote Lobato's work.

The translator Jean Duriau, in a note for the short story "Le Babouin Boucané", declared that Lobato was "the most original of the young Brazilian writers of today, in a country so different from ours, where the rarity of the means of communication slows down the diffusion of what we call progress". The same translator was responsible for "The Clash of the Races" (Le Choc des Races), which was published in the magazine "Revue de l'Amérique Latine" between September 1928 and February 1929. The book edition was published by Valery Larbeaud.

=== Spanish language translation ===
In 1935, the work was published in Argentina by Editoral Claridad and translated by B. de Garay.

=== German language translation ===
According to a January 4, 1927, advertisement in the "Diário da Noite", the work was to be translated into German by Fred Sommer.

== Bibliography ==
Books

This article incorporates text from these sources, which are in the public domain: Lobato, 1926, 1944 and 1951

- Lobato, Monteiro (1926). O Choque das Raças (in Brazilian Portuguese) (1 ed.). São Paulo: Companhia Editora Nacional.
- Santana-Dezmann, Vanete (July 21, 2021). D'Onofrio, Silvio Tamaso (ed.). Entre Metafísica, Distopia e Mecenato. Inclui a primeira edição de O choque das raças ou O presidente negro, de Monteiro Lobato. Ciência (in Brazilian Portuguese). Vol. 1 (1 ed.). São Paulo, SP: Os Caipiras. p. 325. ISBN 9786599559501. OL 49369699M.
- Lobato, Monteiro (1944). A Barca de Gleyre - 1º Tomo. Editora Brasiliense. p. 504.
- Lobato, Monteiro (1951). A Barca de Gleyre – 2º Tomo (PDF). 1ª Série das Obras Completas de Monteiro Lobato (in Brazilian Portuguese). Vol. 11 (4 ed.). São Paulo: Editora Brasiliense. p. 363. Archived from the original (PDF) on November 8, 2024.
- Lobato, Monteiro (1961). Cartas Escolhidas – 1º Tomo. 1ª Série das Obras Completas de Monteiro Lobato (in Brazilian Portuguese). Vol. 16 (2 ed.). São Paulo: Editora Brasiliense. p. 358.
- Zöler, Zöler (2018). Lobato Letrador: 1º passo (in Brazilian Portuguese) (1 ed.). Brasília: Tagore Editora. p. 280. ISBN 9788553250332.

Articles

- Azevedo, Carmen Lucia de; Camargos, Marcia; Sacchetta, Vladimir (2001). "Um Romance Americano". Monteiro Lobato: furacão na Botocúndia (in Brazilian Portuguese) (3 ed.). São Paulo: Ed. SENAC. pp. 213–222. ISBN 978-85-7359-020-3.
- Bayliss, Andrew J. (May 26, 2022). "4. Raising a Spartan". Oxford University Press: 59–76. doi:10.1093/actrade/9780198787600.003.0004. ISBN 978-0-19-878760-0.
- Bertolucci, Denise Maria de Paiva (2022). "Antecedentes da partida da família Monteiro Lobato para Nova Iorque (1927)" (PDF). In Santana-Dezmann, Vanete; Milton, John; D'Onofrio, Silvio Tamaso (eds.). Monteiro Lobato: Novos Estudos (PDF) (in Brazilian Portuguese). Lünen-Alemanha: Oxalá. pp. 43–51. ISBN 9783946277644. Archived from the original on October 30, 2022.
- Dias, Maicon Alves (2009). "A REPRESENTAÇÃO DA REALIDADE EM O PRESIDENTE NEGRO, DE MONTEIRO LOBATO". Miscelânea: Revista de Literatura e Vida Social (in Brazilian Portuguese). 6: 75–85. ISSN 1984-2899.
- Feres Júnior, João; Nascimento, Leonardo Fernandes; Eisenberg, Zena Winona (March 2013). "Monteiro Lobato e o politicamente correto". Dados (in Brazilian Portuguese). 56 (1): 69–108. doi:10.1590/S0011-52582013000100004. ISSN 0011-5258.
- Franca, Vanessa Gomes (2009). "NOSSO JECA E NOSSA EMÍLIA VÃO AO EXTERIOR: AS TRADUÇÕES DAS OBRAS DE MONTEIRO LOBATO". Miscelânea: Revista de Literatura e Vida Social (in Brazilian Portuguese). 6: 40–57. ISSN 1984-2899.
- Formighieri, Ana Paula de Souza (May 15, 2017). "Monteiro Lobato: construção ou denúncia do pensamento racista?" [Construction or denunciation of racist thought?]. Western Paraná State University (Master's degree dissertation) (in Brazilian Portuguese). Cascável: 140.
- Ferreira, Filipe Augusto Chamy Amorim (December 20, 2019). O sonho americano de Monteiro Lobato: relações Brasil-EUA na obra do escritor [Monteiro Lobato's American dream: rapports Brazil-America on the writer's books] (Master's dissertation) (in Brazilian Portuguese). São Paulo: IEB-USP. p. 203. doi:10.11606/d.31.2019.tde-19122019-123314.
- Lajolo, Marisa (1998). "A figura do negro em Monteiro Lobato" (PDF). Unknown. Unicamp-IEL: 9.
- Minchillo, Carlos (2017). "Engenharia reversa em O choque das raças". In Lajolo, Marisa (ed.). Monteiro Lobato, livro a livro: Obra adulta (in Brazilian Portuguese) (1 ed.). São Paulo: Unesp. pp. 139–148. ISBN 978-8595460126.
- Santana-Dezmann, Vanete (2022). "Um capira no Harlem Renaissance: Monteiro Lobato" (PDF). In Santana-Dezmann, Vanete; Milton, John; D'Onofrio, Silvio Tamaso (eds.). Monteiro Lobato: Novos Estudos (PDF) (in Brazilian Portuguese). Lünen-Alemanha: Oxalá. pp. 53–66. ISBN 9783946277644. Archived from the original on December 4, 2022.
- Souza, José Wellington de (2017). "Raça e eugenia na obra geral de Monteiro Lobato" (PDF). Federal University of Juiz de Fora (PhD thesis) (in Brazilian Portuguese): 177.
- Tin, Emerson (December 19, 2012). "Ficção científica no Brasil: O Choque das Raças ou O Presidente Negro, de Monteiro Lobato". Remate de Males (in Brazilian Portuguese). 32 (2). Unicamp: 293–305. doi:10.20396/remate.v32i2.8635888. ISSN 2316-5758. OCLC 8080896683.

Conference

- Aiex, Nola Kortner (1996). Prescient Science Fiction: Monteiro Lobato's "O Presidente Negro" after 70 years (PDF). Paper presented at the Annual Joint Meetings of the Popular Culture Association/American Culture Association (Las Vegas, NV, March 25–28, 1996). Las Vegas. p. 12.

News

- Sobrinho, Faria Neves (October 19, 1926). ""O Principe de Nassau" e "O Choque das Raças"". A Manhã (in Brazilian Portuguese). Vol. II, no. 252. Rio de Janeiro. p. 3.
- ""O Choque"". A Gazeta (in Brazilian Portuguese). Vol. XXI, no. 6270. São Paulo. December 28, 1926. p. 3.
- "O que será o mundo no anno 2228". Diario da Noite (in Brazilian Portuguese). Vol. II, no. 684. January 4, 1927. p. 5.
- "People". Time. Vol. IX, no. 11. March 14, 1927. p. 19.
- Couto, Ribeiro (July 20, 1927). "Lobato e a conquista do mundo". A Manhã (in Brazilian Portuguese). Vol. III, no. 489. Rio de Janeiro. p. 3.
- Phillips, Tom (November 30, 2008). "Presidents and presentiments". The Observer. ISSN 0029-7712.
- "Nova tradução de O Presidente Negro de Monteiro Lobato é publicado pela New London Librarium". Brazilian Times (in Brazilian Portuguese). January 3, 2023. Archived from the original on July 18, 2024.
- Cheney, Glenn Alan (January 15, 2023). "New Translations Introduce Brazil's Lobato and Leminski to U.S." brazzil.

== Talks ==
- "Quem fala por Lobato em O presidente negro ( 19.08.2021 ) on YouTube
- Jornada Monteiro Lobato – ENTRE METAFÍSICA, DISTOPIA E MECENATO on YouTube
- Entre Metafísica, Distopia e Mecenato on YouTube

== Additional reading ==
About the author

- Santana-Dezmann, Vanete (2021b). "Contradições em análises da obra infantil de Monteiro Lobato" (PDF). In Santana-Dezmann, Vanete; Milton, John; D'Onofrio, Silvio Tamaso (eds.). Para compreender Monteiro Lobato: II Jornada Monteiro Lobato (PDF) (in Brazilian Portuguese). Lünen-Alemanha: Oxalá. pp. 97–132. ISBN 9783946277583. Archived from the original (PDF) on December 4, 2022.
- Souza, Wellington José de (2021). "O problema vital de Monteiro Lobato" (PDF). In Santana-Dezmann, Vanete; Milton, John; D'Onofrio, Silvio Tamaso (eds.). Para compreender Monteiro Lobato: II Jornada Monteiro Lobato (PDF) (in Brazilian Portuguese). Lünen-Alemanha: Oxalá. pp. 133–168. ISBN 9783946277583. Archived from the original on October 3, 2022.
- Zoninsein, Manuela (September 30, 2008). "The Black President". Slate. ISSN 1091-2339.

Theme

- "Brazil". Eugenics Archive.
- Mai, Lilian Denise; Angerami, Emília Luigia Saporiti (April 2006). "Eugenia negativa e positiva: significados e contradições". Revista Latino-Americana de Enfermagem (in Brazilian Portuguese). 14 (2): 251–258. doi:10.1590/S0104-11692006000200015. ISSN 0104-1169. PMID 16699700.
