= Self Made (miniseries) =

American drama streaming television limited series

- Poster
- Also known as: Self Made: Inspired by the Life of Madam C. J. Walker
- Based on: On Her Own Ground by A'Lelia Bundles
- Starring: Octavia Spencer; Tiffany Haddish; Carmen Ejogo; Garrett Morris; Kevin Carroll; J. Alphonse Nicholson; Blair Underwood
- Music by: Larry Goldings
- Country of origin: United States
- Original language: English
- No. of episodes: 4

Production
- Executive producers: Janine Sherman Barrois; Elle Johnson; Maverick Carter; LeBron James; Octavia Spencer; Mark Holder; Christine Holder; Kasi Lemmons; Jamal Henderson
- Producers: DeMane Davis; Eric Oberland; Lena Cordina
- Cinematography: Kira Kelly
- Editors: Jessica Hernández; Liza D. Espinas; Susana Benaim
- Running time: 45–49 minutes
- Production companies: SpringHill Entertainment; Orit Entertainment; Wonder Street; Warner Bros. Television

Original release
- Network: Netflix
- Release: March 20, 2020

Self Made: Inspired by the Life of Madam C. J. Walker is an American historical drama television limited series, based on the biography On Her Own Ground by A'Lelia Bundles, that premiered on March 20, 2020, on Netflix. It received generally positive reviews with praise for Octavia Spencer's acting; however it received criticism for various historical inaccuracies and artistic licence. For her performance, Spencer received a nomination for the Primetime Emmy Award for Outstanding Lead Actress in a Limited Series or Movie.

== Premise ==
Self Made is a fictionalized depiction of "the untold story of black hair care pioneer and mogul Madam C. J. Walker and how she overcame the hostilities of turn-of-the-century America, epic rivalries, and tumultuous marriages to become America’s first Black, self-made female millionaire."

== Cast and characters ==
=== Main ===
- Octavia Spencer as Madam C. J. Walker
- Tiffany Haddish as A'Lelia Walker
- Carmen Ejogo as Addie
- Garrett Morris as Cleophus Walker
- Kevin Carroll as Freeman Ransom
- J. Alphonse Nicholson as John Robinson
- Blair Underwood as Charles Joseph Walker

=== Guest ===
- Bill Bellamy as Sweetness
- Zahra Bentham as Nettie
- Mouna Traoré as Esther
- Roger Guenveur Smith as Booker T. Washington
- Kimberly Huie as Margaret Murray Washington
- Cornelius Smith Jr. as W. E. B. Du Bois
- Joanne Jansen as Walker
- Olivia Croft as Josephine Moreland

== Episodes ==
No.	Title	Directed by	Teleplay by	Original release date	Prod. code
1	"The Fight of the Century"	Kasi Lemmons	Nicole Jefferson Asher	March 20, 2020	T13.21551
Sarah Breedlove is a poor washer-woman who is losing her hair when she meets Addie who saves her bald spots with her miracle grow. To show her appreciation of Addie, Sarah wants to become a saleswoman, but Addie knocks her confidence down by telling her to stick to washing as women will never want to buy a product from someone who looks like her. Infuriated, Sarah creates her own line of products. Though they sell well she craves more and decides to move her entire family to Indianapolis. Sarah's company is successful until Addie arrives in town. Frightened by the competition Sarah decides to offer a "buy one get one free" deal but in the ensuing struggle to fulfill orders her home burns down. As she watches Addie scoop up her business, Sarah vows to rebuild her business and takes on the name Madam C. J. Walker.
2	"Bootstraps"	Kasi Lemmons	Janine Sherman Barrois	March 20, 2020	T13.21552
Sarah puts a downpayment on a factory but has trouble securing investors to pay for the rest. She decides to gain Booker T. Washington's endorsement but is blocked from meeting him. Approaching Washington's wife, Margaret, Sarah pleads for her club's support before crashing Washington's conference and making a plea for investors. Washington later crushes her hopes of an endorsement by sharing his own sexist views on women entrepreneurs.
3	"The Walker Girl"	DeMane Davis	Elle Johnson	March 20, 2020	T13.21553
Sarah decides to take her daughter Leila to New York City for a business opportunity over her husband, Charles, who feels like he is being cut out from the business more and more. Addie takes the opportunity to poach five of Sarah's top saleswomen out from under her including Dora, a beautiful saleswoman who is having an affair with Charles. When Sarah returns to the chaos she discovers all that has been going on and once again puts her business first.
4	"A Credit to the Race"	DeMane Davis	Nicole Jefferson Asher	March 20, 2020	T13.21554
As Sarah is expanding her empire out of New York City she learns that she is dying and begins to pressure Leila to provide her with an heir, unaware that Leila is in love with a woman and has been in a relationship with her for years. Meanwhile Charles returns wanting to finalize his divorce with Sarah and threatens to reveal the secret behind her formula if she doesn't sign the papers.

== Production ==
=== Development ===
On November 10, 2016, it was announced that Zero Gravity Management had optioned the screen rights to A'Lelia Bundles' biography of Madam C. J. Walker, entitled On Her Own Ground, with the intent of developing it into a limited series. The production was expected to be written by Nicole Asher, directed by Kasi Lemmons, and produced by Octavia Spencer, Christine Holder, and Mark Holder.

On July 6, 2017, it was announced that Netflix had given the production a series order consisting of eight episodes. Executive producers are expected to include LeBron James, Maverick Carter, Mark Holder, Christine Holder, Janine Sherman Barrois, and Elle Johnson. Lemmons is set to direct and executive produce the first episode. Production companies involved with the series are slated to consist of SpringHill Entertainment alongside Zero Gravity Management. The series premiered on March 20, 2020.

=== Casting ===
Alongside the initial development announcement, it was confirmed that the series would star Octavia Spencer as Madam C. J. Walker. On August 6, 2019, it was reported that Tiffany Haddish, Carmen Ejogo, Blair Underwood, Garrett Morris, and Kevin Carroll had joined the cast. On August 21, 2019, Bill Bellamy was cast in the miniseries. On October 15, 2019, Zahra Bentham and Mouna Traoré were cast in recurring roles.

=== Filming ===
Filming for the limited series took from July 26 to September 20, 2019, in the Canadian cities of Mississauga, Cambridge, Stratford and St. Catharines.

== Reception ==
=== Critical response ===
On review aggregator website Rotten Tomatoes, the miniseries holds an approval rating of 68% based on 25 reviews, with an average rating of 5.66/10. The website's critics consensus reads, "Self Made doesn't always live up to its namesake, but there's no denying that Octavia Spencer's spectacular embodiment of the singular Madam C.J. Walker is a sight to be seen." On Metacritic, it has a weighted average score of 64 out of 100, based on 17 critics, indicating "generally favorable reviews". Other reviews report disappointment because of the fictionalization and inaccuracies in the storyline. Addie Monroe is a fictionalized character intended to portray Annie Malone, another self-made millionaire who actually was the mentor of Walker. She is portrayed as a villain while another falsification is the portrayal of Walker's daughter as a lesbian.

=== Accolades ===
List of Accolades
Award / Film Festival	Year	Recipient	Nomination	Result
Black Reel TV Awards	2020	Self Made	Outstanding TV Movie/Limited Series	Nominated
Black Reel TV Awards	2020	Blair Underwood	Outstanding Actor, TV Movie/Limited Series	Won
Black Reel TV Awards	2020	Octavia Spencer	Outstanding Actress, TV Movie/Limited Series	Nominated
Black Reel TV Awards	2020	Bill Bellamy	Outstanding Supporting Actor, TV Movie/Limited Series	Nominated
Black Reel TV Awards	2020	Carmen Ejogo	Outstanding Supporting Actress, TV Movie/Limited Series	Nominated
Primetime Emmy Awards	2020	Octavia Spencer	Outstanding Lead Actress in a Limited Series or Movie	Nominated
Golden Reel Awards	2021	Outstanding Achievement in Sound Editing – Single Presentation	Bobbi Banks, Ezra Dweck, Paul Menichini, Bernard Weiser, Butch Wolf, Sanaa Kelley and Stephen Lotwis (for "The Fight of the Century")	Nominated
NAACP Image Awards	2021	Self Made	Outstanding Television Movie, Mini-Series or Dramatic Special	Won
NAACP Image Awards	2021	Blair Underwood	Outstanding Actor in a Television Movie, Mini-Series or Dramatic Special	Won
NAACP Image Awards	2021	Octavia Spencer	Outstanding Actress in a Television Movie, Mini-Series or Dramatic Special	Won
