= Sterling Houston =

American dramatist (1945–2006)

- Born: 1945; San Antonio, Texas, U.S.
- Died: November 8, 2006 (aged 60–61); San Antonio, Texas, U.S.
- Education: Los Angeles City College
- Occupation: Dramatist
- Partner: Larry Neal

Sterling Houston (1945 – November 8, 2006) was an African-American experimental playwright, actor, musician and prose writer renowned for his works of social commentary exploring black and gay identity. His plays encompassed multiple theatrical genres, including musicals, dramas and comedies. He also wrote several prose works of fiction and non-fiction.

== Life and career ==
Born in 1945 in San Antonio, Texas, Houston later moved to southern California, where he attended Los Angeles City College until 1964, when he left California for New York City to study acting. He worked for several years acting in off-Broadway productions with the Playhouse of Ridiculous Theater. In 1968 he returned to California, settling in San Francisco with his partner Larry Neal. From 1968 to 1977, Houston and Neal performed as the band Fleshtones. From 1978 to 1981, Houston worked for the Magic Theatre in San Francisco. He returned to San Antonio in 1981 to work in his family's travel agency. In 1988, he became involved with Jump-Start Performance Co., a small theater group in San Antonio.

Houston lectured at numerous colleges and universities, and presented at conferences on theater, the arts, and grant writing.

He died in San Antonio on November 8, 2006. In September 2009, Jump-Start Performance Co. named its performance venue the Sterling Houston Theater.

== Works ==
Among Houston's plays are:

- A'Lelia (a musical about A'Lelia Walker, co-written by Lary Neal)
- Driving Wheel
- Relationships: Good and Not So Good
- La Frontera
- High Yellow' Rose
- Isis in Nubia
- Santo Negro
- On the Pulse of the Morning (collaboration with Maya Angelou)
- Black Lily, White Lily
- The Alien Show/Kool Jams '99
- Message Sent
- Cameoland
- Miranda Rites
- Le Griffon
- Womandingo

His prose works include the semi-autobiographical Moan Your Mourners (1994), the fiction work Le Griffon (1999) and Four Plays by Sterling Houston (1998). In 2005, Four Plays was republished as Myth, Magic and Farce: Four Multicultural Plays.

== Awards ==
Houston's many accolades include the 1991 Artist of the Year award from the San Antonio Business Committee for the Arts, the 1992 Artist of the Year Award from the San Antonio Light newspaper, the 1997 Arts and Letters Award from the San Antonio Public Library, and a citation in 1997 from the Texas State Legislature for his contributions to the cultural life of Texas.

Several of his plays also received local theater awards and nominations, and in 2003 Cameoland was named among the ten best plays of the year by the San Antonio Express-News newspaper. In 1995, Houston was one of the founding members of the San Antonio Theatre Coalition (SATCO) and became its director emeritus.
