= A'Lelia Bundles =

American journalist

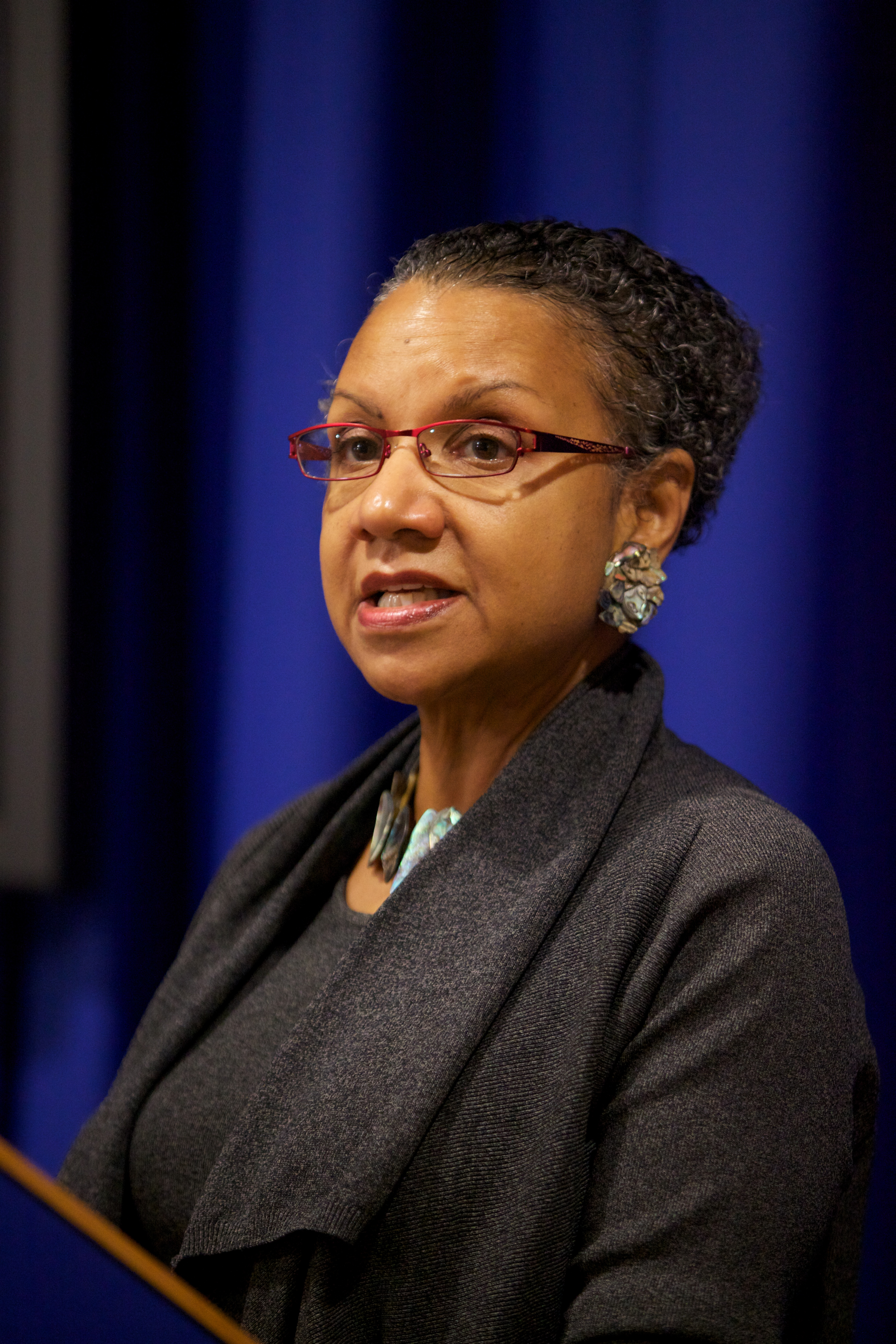
- Bundles in 2012
- Born: June 7, 1952 (age 74); Chicago, Illinois, U.S.
- Education: Harvard University (BA); Columbia University (MS)
- Occupations: journalist; news producer; author
- Family: A'Lelia Walker (great-grandmother); Madam C. J. Walker (great-great-grandmother)
- Awards: duPont Gold Baton, 1994; American Book Award, 1992; Black Caucus of the American Library Association Honor Book, 2002; American Academy of Arts and Sciences, 2015; MacDowell Colony Fellowship, 2017

A'Lelia Perry Bundles (born June 7, 1952) is an American journalist, news producer and author, known for her 2001 biography of her great-great-grandmother Madam C. J. Walker.

== Family and early life ==
A'Lelia Bundles grew up in Indianapolis in a family of civic minded business executives. She was named after her great-grandmother A'Lelia Walker (1885–1931), a central figure of the Harlem Renaissance and daughter of entrepreneur Madam C. J. Walker. Bundles' mother, A'Lelia Mae Perry Bundles (1928–1976), vice president of the Madam C. J. Walker Manufacturing Company and active in local and state Democratic politics, also served as a member of the Washington Township School Board and was a fiscal administrator with the City of Indianapolis. Her father, S. Henry Bundles Jr. (1927–2019), became president of Summit Laboratories, another hair care manufacturer, in 1957 after having worked briefly with the Walker Company. He served as an Indianapolis 500 Festival director for many years and was a board member of the Indianapolis Convention and Visitors Bureau. He was the founding president of the Center for Leadership Development, a youth enrichment organization in Indianapolis.

Bundles graduated in 1970 in the top five per cent of her class from North Central High School, where she was co-editor of the Northern Lights, vice president of student council and co-chair and founder of the human relations council, which addressed racial issues in a student population less than ten percent black. In 1974 Bundles graduated magna cum laude from Harvard and Radcliffe Colleges when women admitted to Radcliffe attended classes beside male students at Harvard and received a joint diploma. She was inducted into Harvard's Alpha Iota chapter of Phi Beta Kappa. Bundles received a master's degree from the Columbia University Graduate School of Journalism in 1976.

== Career ==
She was a producer and executive with ABC News, serving as director of talent development in Washington, D.C., and New York; as deputy bureau chief in Washington, DC; as a producer for World News Tonight with Peter Jennings; and as chair of a diversity council advising ABC News president David Westin. Prior to joining ABC News, she was a producer with NBC News in the New York, Houston and Atlanta bureaus for The Today Show and NBC Nightly News with Tom Brokaw. She also was a producer in Washington, D.C., for two of NBC's magazine programs co-anchored by Connie Chung and Roger Mudd during the 1980s.

Her book, On Her Own Ground: The Life and Times of Madam C. J. Walker (Scribner, 2001), was named a New York Times' Notable Book in 2001, and received the Association of Black Women Historians 2001 Letitia Woods Brown Prize for the best book on black women's history. In 2020, the book was adapted into the Netflix mini-series Self Made starring Octavia Spencer. Bundles' young adult book Madam C. J. Walker: Entrepreneur, (Chelsea House, 1991) received a 1992 American Book Award from the Before Columbus Foundation.

She is a former trustee of Columbia University and a former chair of the Board of Directors of the National Archives Foundation.

She is on several nonprofit boards including the Harvard Radcliffe Institute for Advanced Study's Schlesinger Library, the March On! Festival, Columbia Global Reports and the Women's Suffrage National Monument Foundation. Past board memberships include the Harvard Alumni Association nominating committee, the Harvard Club of Washington, DC board, the Radcliffe College Trustees Board, and the National Women's Hall of Fame board. She was president of the Radcliffe College Alumnae Association from 1999 to 2001 and chaired the Columbia University Graduate School of Journalism's alumni advisory committee to change the school's alumni organization in 2006.

== Madam C. J. Walker and A'Lelia Walker Projects ==
As Madam C. J. Walker's great-great-granddaughter and biographer, she founded the Madam Walker Family Archives and represents the Walker estate for intellectual property and promotional matters.

She collaborated with Mattel on the production of a Madam Walker Barbie as part of Barbie's Inspiring Women Series in August 2022.

Joy Goddess: A'Lelia Walker and the Harlem Renaissance was published on June 10, 2025, by Scribner as the first major biography of this celebrity heiress and arts patron who traveled internationally and hosted some of the most memorable parties of New York's Jazz Age. Bundles's nonfiction biography, On Her Own Ground: The Life and Times of Madam C. J. Walker was optioned for a 2020 Netflix series, Self Made, starring Octavia Spencer. She has discussed the historical inaccuracies and behind-the-scenes creative differences in several interviews, podcasts and articles including an Andscape article where she wrote "I'd been part of a complex and frustrating dance as my nonfiction, fact-based material was translated from book to movie by scriptwriters whose visions, goals and sensibilities often were quite different from mine...I had been anticipating Hidden Figures. Instead The Real Housewives of Atlanta was staring back at me."

== Published works ==
- Joy Goddess: A'Lelia Walker and the Harlem Renaissance (Scribner, 2025)
- "At the Harlem Renaissance's Most Lavish Parties, Glamour Was a Tool of Resistance" (Town & Country, June 10, 2025)
- "To Tell the Honest Truth: Why Black Women's Stories Remain Essential" (LitHub.com, June 11, 2025)
- On Her Own Ground: The Life and Times of Madam C. J. Walker (Scribner, 2001)
- Madam C. J. Walker: Entrepreneur (Chelsea House, 1991; revised 2008)
- Madam Walker Theatre Center: An Indianapolis Treasure (Arcadia Publishing, 2013)
- All about Madam C. J. Walker (Blue River Press/Cardinal Publishing, 2017)
- "Madam C. J. Walker" and "A'Lelia Walker" entries in Henry Louis Gates and Evelyn Higginbotham's African American National Biography
- "Madam C. J. Walker" entry in Darlene Clark Hines's Black Women in America.
- "Netflix's 'Self Made' Suffers from Self-Inflicted Wounds" (Andscape.com, May 12, 2020)

== Awards ==
- Forbes 50 Over 50 Impact List 2021
- Emmy Award (NBC News)
- duPont Gold Baton (ABC News 1994)
- American Book Award 1992 for Madam C. J. Walker: Entrepreneur (Chelsea House, 1991)
- The New York Times Notable Book for On Her Own Ground: The Life and Times of Madam C. J. Walker 2001
- Black Caucus of the American Library Association Honor Book 2002
- Letitia Woods Brown Book Prize from the Association of Black Women Historians 2001
- Distinguished alumni awards from Harvard University, Radcliffe College (2004) and Columbia University (2007)
- Honorary doctorate, Indiana University, 2003
- North Central High School Hall of Fame
- Black Memorabilia Hall of Fame
- Indiana Historical Society's Indiana Living Legend, 2021

== Personal life ==
Bundles is a member of the Daughters of the American Revolution as a direct descendant of American Revolutionary War patriot Ishmael Roberts.
