= A'Lelia Walker =

American businesswoman

- Born: Lelia McWilliams; June 6, 1885; Vicksburg, Mississippi, U.S.
- Died: August 17, 1931 (aged 46); Long Branch, New Jersey, U.S.
- Occupations: Businesswoman; hair-care entrepreneur
- Spouses: John Robinson (?–1914; div); Wiley Wilson (1919–?; div) James Arthur Kennedy (m. 1926; div. 1931)
- Children: Mae Walker (but no biological offspring)
- Parent(s): Madam C. J. Walker; Moses McWilliams
- Family: A'Lelia Bundles (great-granddaughter)

A'Lelia Walker (born Lelia McWilliams; June 6, 1885 – August 17, 1931) was an American businesswoman and patron of the arts. She was the only surviving child of Madam C. J. Walker, who was popularly credited as being the first self-made female millionaire in the United States and one of the first African-American millionaires.

== Life and career ==
=== Early life ===
A'Lelia Walker was born Lelia McWilliams in Vicksburg, Mississippi, in 1885, the daughter of Moses and Sarah (née Breedlove) McWilliams. Her father died when she was two years old, and she moved with her mother to St. Louis, Missouri to live with her mother's three brothers. Her mother married John Davis in 1894 and divorced in 1903. In 1906, her mother married Charles Joseph Walker, a newspaper advertising salesman, and became an independent hairdresser and cosmetic cream retailer. A'Lelia grew up in St. Louis and attended Knoxville College in Tennessee before entering the family business, having taken the Walker name.

=== Madam C. J. Walker Manufacturing Company ===
A'Lelia Walker ran the East Coast operations of her mother's company. Her mother purchased two brownstones in New York City at 108-110 West 136th Street near Lenox Avenue in Harlem, and combined them. The first floor housed the Walker Hair Parlor, and the second the Lelia College of Beauty Culture, where new cosmeticians were trained to work in the company's shops. A'Lelia lived and entertained in the top three floors. She became president of the company in 1919, upon her mother's death, and remained in that position until she died in August 1931. She initiated several marketing campaigns to promote the company—including a competition among prominent ministers for a Trip to the Holy Land in 1924—and remained the face of the Walker Company. Still, day-to-day operations were overseen by attorney F. B. Ransom and factory manager Alice Kelly at the Indianapolis headquarters. During the 1920s, A'Lelia Walker immersed herself in Harlem's dynamic social life as a patron of the arts and hostess of some of the era's most notable social gatherings.

Walker Company sales began to suffer in 1929, with the beginning of the Great Depression. A new million-dollar headquarters and manufacturing facility, opened in late 1927 in Indianapolis, placed additional expenses and financial pressure on the operation, and she sold a great deal of valuable art and antiques. Her adopted daughter Mae Walker became company president from 1931 until she died in 1945. In a fourth-generation succession, Mae's daughter A'Lelia Mae Perry Bundles (b. 1928– d. 1976) succeeded her mother as the head of the company. Today, the company's building is known as the Madame Walker Theatre Center and is a National Historic Landmark.

=== Patronage ===
A'Lelia Walker counted among her friends many accomplished African American musicians. She developed an early love of classical music and opera in part because the choir director at the AME church she and her mother attended in St. Louis was a classically trained opera singer and organist. She grew up in the neighborhood where Scott Joplin and other ragtime musicians gathered at Tom Turpin's Rosebud Cafe on St. Louis's Market Street.

During the 1920s, she hosted many musicians, actors, writers, artists, political figures, and socialites in her Manhattan townhouse. The elegant brick and limestone building had been designed by Vertner Tandy, a founder of Alpha Phi Alpha fraternity and the first black architect licensed in New York State. Almost from the time of her arrival in Harlem in 1913, her dinner parties, dances, and soirées included well-known Harlem figures like James Reese Europe, J. Rosamond Johnson, Bert Williams and Florence Mills, as well as members of the Harlem Renaissance such as Langston Hughes, Countee Cullen, and Carl Van Vechten. Live music – from classical and ragtime to jazz and blues – was a regular feature with entertainment provided by her musician friends. According to NPR:

They provided a safe, welcoming environment for queer people at a time when there were few other social options available. While she herself was not known to be lesbian or bisexual, Walker's parties were places where anyone could express their sexuality however they pleased.

In an oral history for the Lesbian Herstory Archives Mabel Hampton, the lesbian activist, described attending a party at Walker's home where she said some party-goers were naked and openly having sex.

In October 1927, she converted a home floor into The Dark Tower, a cultural salon that became legendary as one of the gathering places of the era. Harlem's talented artists socialized with their Greenwich Village counterparts and European and African royalty in this place. She commissioned Austrian designer Paul Frankl to create the interior. She also entertained at her pied-à-terre at 80 Edgecombe Avenue in Harlem and Villa Lewaro, her country house in Irvington, New York in Westchester County – a 20,000-square-foot (1,900 m^{2}) Italianate mansion which she had built for her mother in 1916 to 1918, again designed by Tandy. Villa Lewaro was named for Walker (Lelia Walker Robinson) after Italian tenor Enrico Caruso told her after a visit to the property that the newly built Irvington-on-Hudson mansion reminded him of the houses of his native country.

Walker also founded the Harlem Debutantes Club. She attended Knoxville College and was a member of St. James Presbyterian Church in Harlem, where she married Dr. Wiley Wilson. She supported local missionary work among Baptist women in New York City. She attended a Baptist church and served on various committees, occasionally speaking for women's days and professional events.

== Personal life ==
Walker was married three times: to John Robinson, a hotel waiter, from whom she separated about 1911 and divorced in 1914; to Dr. Wiley Wilson in 1919; and to Dr. James Arthur Kennedy, in 1926, whom she divorced just a few months before she died in 1931.

In the 1920s, Walker spent four months traveling throughout Europe and elsewhere, visiting Paris, Nice, Monte Carlo, Naples, Rome, Cairo, Jerusalem, Djibouti, Addis Ababa, and London. In Paris she spent time with jazz drummer Louis Mitchell and his wife Antoinette Brooks Mitchell, couturier Paul Poiret, actress Mistinguett, and actor Dooley Wilson. She also visited Zewditu, the Empress of Ethiopia while on her way to Addis Ababa.

Her adoptive daughter, Fairy Mae Bryant, was born in November 1898 and was adopted in 1912. She was known as "Mae Walker" and traveled with Madam C. J. Walker as a model and assistant. In November 1923, A'Lelia Walker orchestrated an elaborate "Million Dollar Wedding" (closer to $40,000) for Mae's marriage to Dr. Gordon Jackson. Mae, a graduate of Spelman Seminary in Atlanta, divorced Jackson in 1926 and married Attorney Marion R. Perry in September 1927. When Walker died in 1931, Mae took over the company until she died in 1945, when she was succeeded by her daughter, A'Lelia Mae Perry Bundles.

== Death and legacy ==
A'Lelia Walker died on August 17, 1931, of a cerebral hemorrhage brought on by hypertension, the same ailment that led to her mother's death in 1919. She was surrounded by friends who had traveled to Long Branch, New Jersey to celebrate a birthday party with lobster and champagne amid the Great Depression and Prohibition. Thousands of Harlemites lined up to view her body. She was eulogized by Reverend Adam Clayton Powell Sr. at the funeral parlor on Seventh Avenue. Mary McLeod Bethune, the civil rights activist, also spoke at the funeral. As her casket was lowered into the ground next to her mother's grave at Woodlawn Cemetery in the Bronx, Hubert Julian —the celebrated "Black Eagle"— flew over in a small plane and dropped dahlias and gladioli onto the site.

Langston Hughes called her death "The end of the gay times of the New Negro era in Harlem." He later wrote in his book, The Big Sea, that, fittingly, the funeral resembled a big party, "with hundreds of friends outside, waving their white, engraved invitations aloft in the vain hope of entering."

Sterling Houston and Lary Neal wrote A'Lelia, a musical about Walker.

Actress Tiffany Haddish portrayed Walker in the Netflix miniseries Self Made: Inspired by the Life of Madam C. J. Walker which premiered on March 20, 2020.

== See also ==
- A'Lelia Bundles
- Madam C. J. Walker
- Madam Walker Legacy Center
- Villa Lewaro
- List of people from Harlem
