= Madam C. J. Walker =

American entrepreneur, philanthropist, and activist (1867–1919)

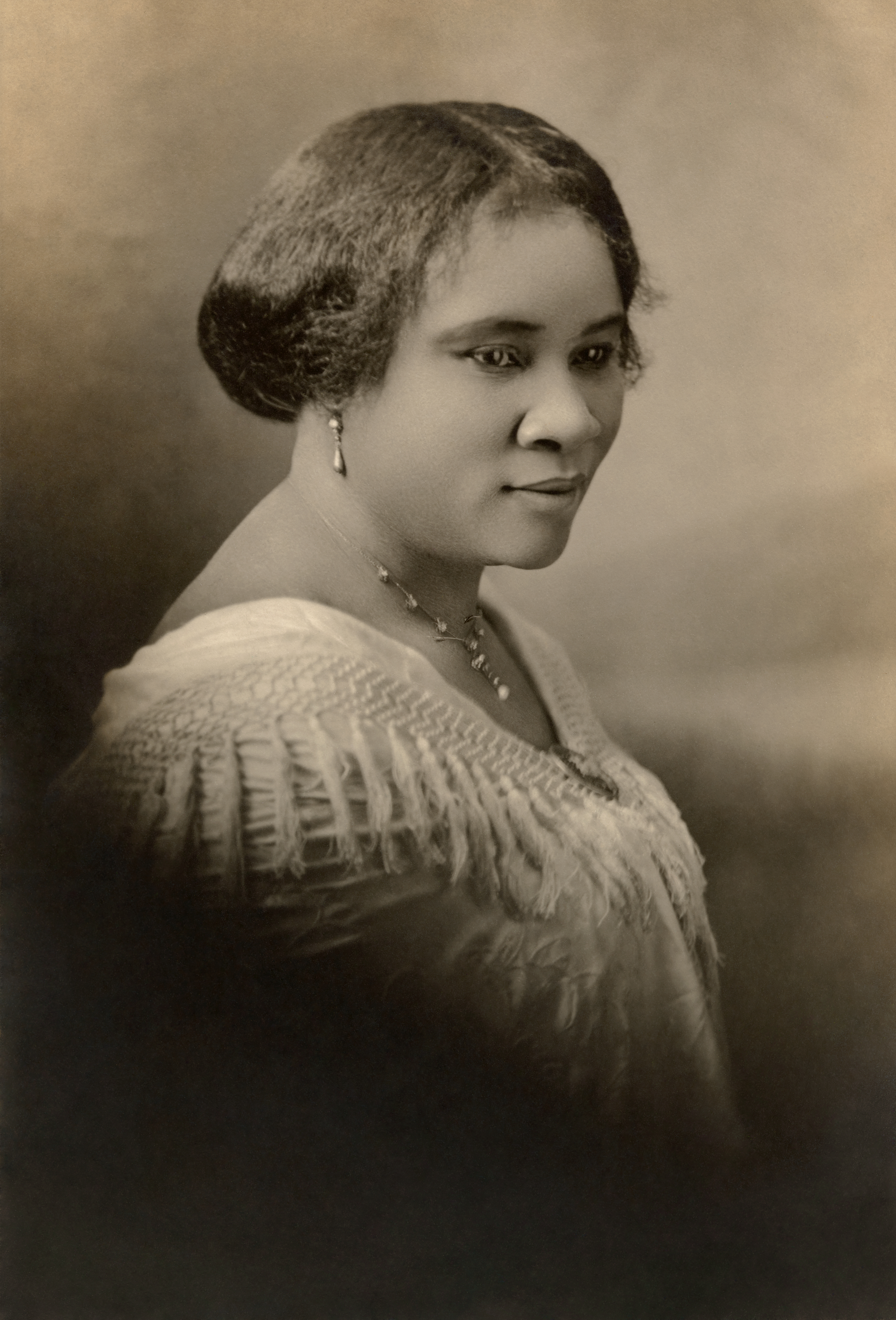
- Walker c. 1914
- Born: Sarah Breedlove; December 23, 1867; Delta, Fifth Military District (Louisiana), U.S.
- Died: May 25, 1919 (aged 51); Irvington, New York, U.S.
- Resting place: Woodlawn Cemetery (Bronx, New York)
- Occupations: Businesswoman; hair care entrepreneur; philanthropist; activist
- Known for: Founder of Madam C. J. Walker Manufacturing Company
- Spouses: Moses McWilliams (m. 1882; died 1887); John Davis (m. 1894; div. 1903); Charles Walker (m. 1906; div. 1912)
- Children: A'Lelia Walker
- Relatives: A'Lelia Bundles (great–great granddaughter)
- Website: madamcjwalker.com

Madam C. J. Walker (born Sarah Breedlove; December 23, 1867 – May 25, 1919), Mrs. Charles Joseph Walker was an American entrepreneur, philanthropist, and political and social activist. Walker is recorded as the first woman to become a self-made millionaire in America in the Guinness Book of World Records. Multiple sources mention that although other women (like Mary Ellen Pleasant) might have been the first, their wealth is not so well-documented.

Walker made her fortune by developing and marketing a line of cosmetics and hair care products for Black women through the business she founded, Madam C. J. Walker Manufacturing Company. Walker became known also for her philanthropy and activism. Walker made financial donations to numerous organizations such as the NAACP and became a patron of the arts. Villa Lewaro, Walker's lavish estate in Irvington, New York served as a social gathering place for the African-American community. At the time of her death, Walker was considered the wealthiest African-American businesswoman and wealthiest self-made Black woman in America.

== Early life ==
Madam C. J. Walker was born Sarah Breedlove on December 23, 1867, close to Delta, Louisiana. Her parents were Owen and Minerva (née Anderson) Breedlove. Breedlove had five siblings, who included an older sister, Louvenia, and four brothers: Alexander, James, Solomon, and Owen Jr.. Robert W. Burney enslaved her older siblings and parents on his Madison Parish plantation; Sarah was the first child in her family born into freedom. Her mother died in 1872, likely from cholera; an epidemic had traveled with river passengers up the Mississippi, reaching Tennessee and related areas in 1873. Her father remarried but died a year later.

Orphaned at the age of seven, Breedlove moved to Vicksburg, Mississippi, at 10, where she lived with Louvenia and her brother-in-law, Jesse Powell. Breedlove started working as a child as a domestic servant. "I had little or no opportunity when I started out in life, having been left an orphan and being without mother or father since I was seven years of age," Breedlove often recounted. Breedlove also stated that she had only three months of formal education, which she undertook during Sunday school literacy lessons at the church she attended during her earlier years.

== Personal life ==
=== Marriage and family ===
In 1882, at the age of 14, Breedlove married Moses McWilliams whose age was unknown, to escape abuse from her brother-in-law, Jesse Powell. Breedlove and McWilliams had one daughter, Lelia, who was born on June 6, 1885. When McWilliams died in 1887, Breedlove was twenty; Lelia was two. Breedlove remarried in 1894, but left her second husband, John Davis, around 1903.

In January 1906, Breedlove married Charles Joseph Walker, a newspaper advertising salesman she had known in St. Louis, Missouri. After this marriage, Breedlove began marketing herself as "Madam C. J. Walker". The couple divorced in 1912; Charles died in 1926. Lelia McWilliams adopted her stepfather's surname and became known as A'Lelia Walker.

=== Religion ===
Walker was a Christian; her faith had a significant influence on her philanthropy. Walker was a member of the African Methodist Episcopal Church.

== Career ==
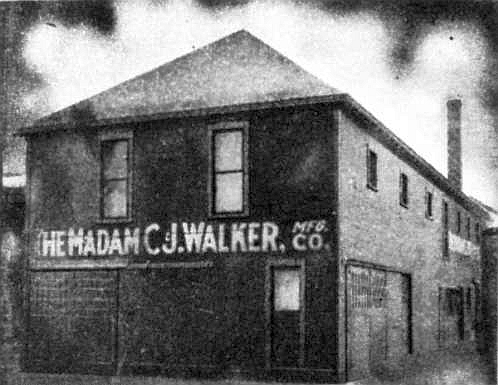
C. J. Walker Manufacturing Company, Indianapolis, Indiana, 1911

In 1888, Breedlove moved, with Lelia, to St. Louis, where three of her brothers lived. Breedlove found work as a laundress, earning barely more than a dollar a day. Breedlove was determined to make enough money to provide Lelia with formal education. During the 1880s, Breedlove lived in a community where Ragtime music was developed; she sang at St. Paul African Methodist Episcopal Church and started to yearn for an educated life as she watched the community of women at her church.

Breedlove suffered severe dandruff and other scalp ailments, including baldness, due to skin disorders and the application of harsh products to cleanse hair and wash clothes. Other contributing factors to her hair loss included poor diet, illnesses, and infrequent bathing and hair washing during a time when most Americans lacked indoor plumbing, central heating, and electricity.

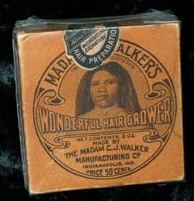
Madam C. J. Walker's Wonderful Hair Grower in the permanent collection of The Children's Museum of Indianapolis

Initially, Breedlove learned about hair care from her brothers, who were barbers in St. Louis. Around the time of the Louisiana Purchase Exposition (World's Fair at St. Louis in 1904), Breedlove became a commission agent selling products for Annie Turnbo Malone, an African-American haircare entrepreneur and owner of the Poro Company. Sales at the exposition were a disappointment since the African-American community was largely ignored.

While working for Malone, who would later become a significant rival in the haircare industry, Breedlove began to take her new knowledge and develop a product line. In July 1905, when Breedlove was 37 years old, she moved with Lelia to Denver, Colorado, where she initially continued to sell products for Malone while developing her own haircare business. However, the two businesswomen had a falling-out when Malone accused Breedlove of stealing her formula, a mixture of petroleum jelly and sulfur that had been in use for a hundred years.

After marrying Charles Walker in 1906, Breedlove marketed herself as "Madam C. J. Walker", an independent hairdresser and cosmetic cream retailer. ("Madam" was adopted from women pioneers of the French beauty industry.) Charles, also her business partner, provided advice on advertising and promotion. Walker sold her products door to door, teaching other black women how to groom and style their hair.

In 1906, Walker put A'Lelia in charge of the mail-order operation in Denver while she and Charles traveled throughout the southern and eastern United States to expand the business. In 1908, Walker and her husband relocated to Pittsburgh, Pennsylvania, where they opened a beauty parlor and established Lelia College to train "hair culturists". As an advocate of black women's economic independence, Walker opened training programs in the "Walker System" for her national network of licensed sales agents who earned healthy commissions.

After Walker closed the business in Denver in 1907, A'Lelia joined her in Pittsburgh. In 1910, when Walker established a new base in Indianapolis, A'Lelia ran the day-to-day operations in Pittsburgh. A'Lelia also persuaded her mother to establish an office and beauty salon in New York City's growing Harlem neighborhood in 1913; it became a center of African-American culture.

In 1910, Walker relocated her businesses to Indianapolis, where she established the headquarters for the Madam C. J. Walker Manufacturing Company. Walker initially purchased a house and factory at 640 North West Street. Walker later built a factory, hair salon, and beauty school to train her sales agents and added a laboratory to help with research. Walker also assembled a staff that included Freeman Ransom, Robert Lee Brokenburr, Alice Kelly, and Marjorie Joyner, among others, to assist in managing the growing company. Many of her company's employees, including those in key management and staff positions, were women.

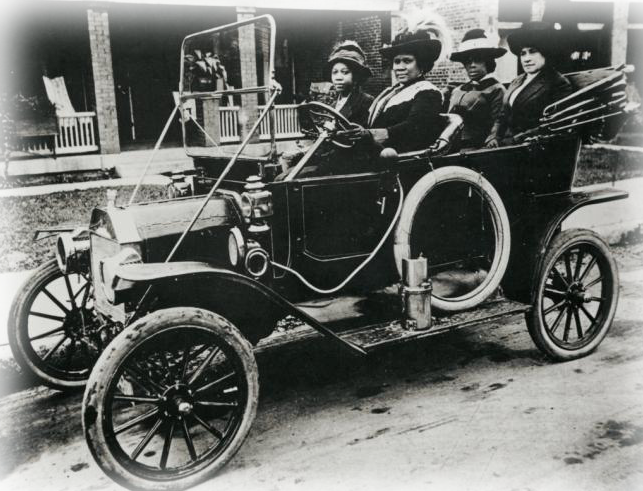
Madam Walker and several friends in her automobile, 1911

Walker designed a method of grooming to promote hair growth and to condition the scalp through the use of her products. The system included a shampoo, a pomade stated to help hair grow, strenuous brushing, and applying iron combs to hair; Walker purported that method made lackluster and brittle hair soft and luxuriant. Walker's product line had several competitors. Walker's competitors produced similar products in Europe and the United States, including Malone's Poro System and Sarah Spencer Washington's Apex System.

Between 1911 and 1919, during the height of her career, Walker and her company employed several thousand women as sales agents for its products. By 1917, the company claimed to have trained nearly 20,000 women. While some sources have written that the women dressed in a characteristic uniform of white shirts and black skirts and carried black satchels, there is nothing in the Walker Beauty School manual that verifies that. Others have written the agents focused on door-to-door sales as they visited houses around the United States and in the Caribbean offering Walker's hair pomade and other products packaged in tin containers carrying her image. Still, the typical scenario involved Walker beauty culturists demonstrating their products in their homes and beauty salons because they needed a water source to show how the products worked. Walker understood the power of advertising and brand awareness. Heavy advertising, primarily in African-American newspapers and magazines, and Walker's frequent travels to promote her products helped make her well known in the United States.

In addition to training in sales and grooming, Walker showed other Black women how to budget and build businesses and encouraged them to become financially independent. In 1917, inspired by the model of the National Association of Colored Women, Walker began organizing her sales agents into state and local clubs. The result was the establishment of the National Beauty Culturists and Benevolent Association of Madam C. J. Walker Agents (predecessor to the Madam C. J. Walker Beauty Culturists Union of America).

Its first annual conference convened in Philadelphia during the summer of 1917 with 200 attendees. The conference was among the first national gatherings of women entrepreneurs to discuss business and commerce. During the convention, Walker gave prizes to women who had sold the most products and brought in the most new sales agents. Walker also rewarded those who made the most considerable contributions to charities in their communities.

Walker's name became even more widely known by the 1920s, after her death, as her company's business market expanded beyond the United States to Cuba, Jamaica, Haiti, Panama, and Costa Rica.

== Activism and philanthropy ==
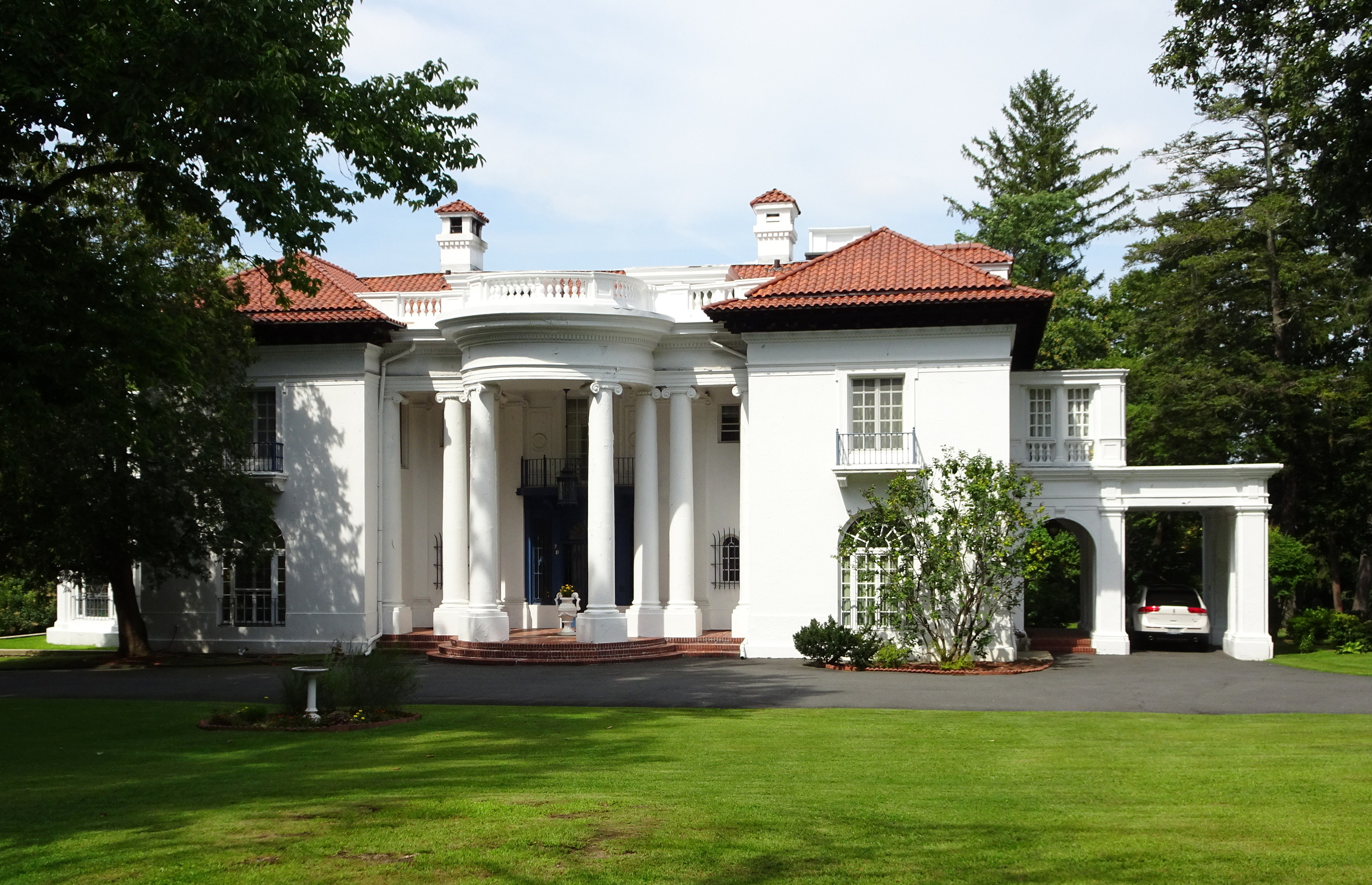
Walker's home at 67 Broadway in Irvington, New York

As Walker's wealth and influence increased, she became more vocal about her views. In 1912, Walker addressed an annual gathering of the National Negro Business League (NNBL) from the convention floor, where she declared: "I am a woman who came from the cotton fields of the South. From there, I was promoted to the washtub. From there, I was promoted to the cook kitchen. And from there, I promoted myself into the business of manufacturing hair goods and preparations. I have built my own factory on my own ground." The following year, Walker addressed convention-goers from the podium as a keynote speaker.

Walker helped raise funds to establish a branch of YMCA in Indianapolis's black community, pledging $1,000 to the building fund for Senate Avenue YMCA. Walker also contributed scholarship funds to the Tuskegee Institute. Other beneficiaries included Indianapolis's Flanner House and Bethel African Methodist Episcopal Church; Mary McLeod Bethune's Daytona Education and Industrial School for Negro Girls (which later became Bethune-Cookman University) in Daytona Beach, Florida; the Palmer Memorial Institute in North Carolina; and the Haines Normal and Industrial Institute in Georgia. Walker was also a patron of the arts.

About 1913, Walker's daughter, A'Lelia, moved to a new townhouse in Harlem. In 1916, Walker joined her in New York, leaving the day-to-day operation of her company to her management team in Indianapolis. In 1917, Walker commissioned Vertner Tandy, the first licensed black architect in New York City and a founding member of Alpha Phi Alpha fraternity, to design her house in Irvington-on-Hudson, New York. Walker intended for Villa Lewaro, which cost $250,000 to build, to become a gathering place for community leaders and to inspire other African Americans to pursue their dreams. Walker moved into the house in May 1918 and hosted an opening event to honor Emmett Jay Scott, at that time the Assistant Secretary for Negro Affairs of the U.S. Department of War.

Walker became more involved in political matters after her move to New York. Walker delivered lectures on political, economic, and social issues at conventions sponsored by powerful black institutions. Her friends and associates included Booker T. Washington, Mary McLeod Bethune, and W. E. B. Du Bois. During World War I, Walker was a leader in the Circle For Negro War Relief and advocated for the establishment of a training camp for black army officers. In 1917, Walker joined the executive committee of the New York chapter of the National Association for the Advancement of Colored People (NAACP), which organized the Silent Protest Parade on New York City's Fifth Avenue. The public demonstration drew more than 8,000 African Americans to protest a riot in East Saint Louis that killed 39 African Americans. Also, from 1917 until her death, Walker was a member of the Committee of Management of the Harlem YWCA, influencing the development of training in beauty skills to young women by the organization.

Profits from her business significantly impacted Walker's contributions to her political and philanthropic interests. In 1918, the National Association of Colored Women's Clubs (NACWC) honored Walker for making the largest individual contribution to help preserve Frederick Douglass's Anacostia house. Before Walker died in 1919, Walker pledged $5,000 (the equivalent of about $88,000 in 2023) to the NAACP's anti-lynching fund. At the time, it was the largest gift from an individual that the NAACP had ever received. Walker bequeathed nearly $100,000 to orphanages, institutions, and individuals; her will directed two-thirds of future net profits of her estate to charity.

== Death and legacy ==
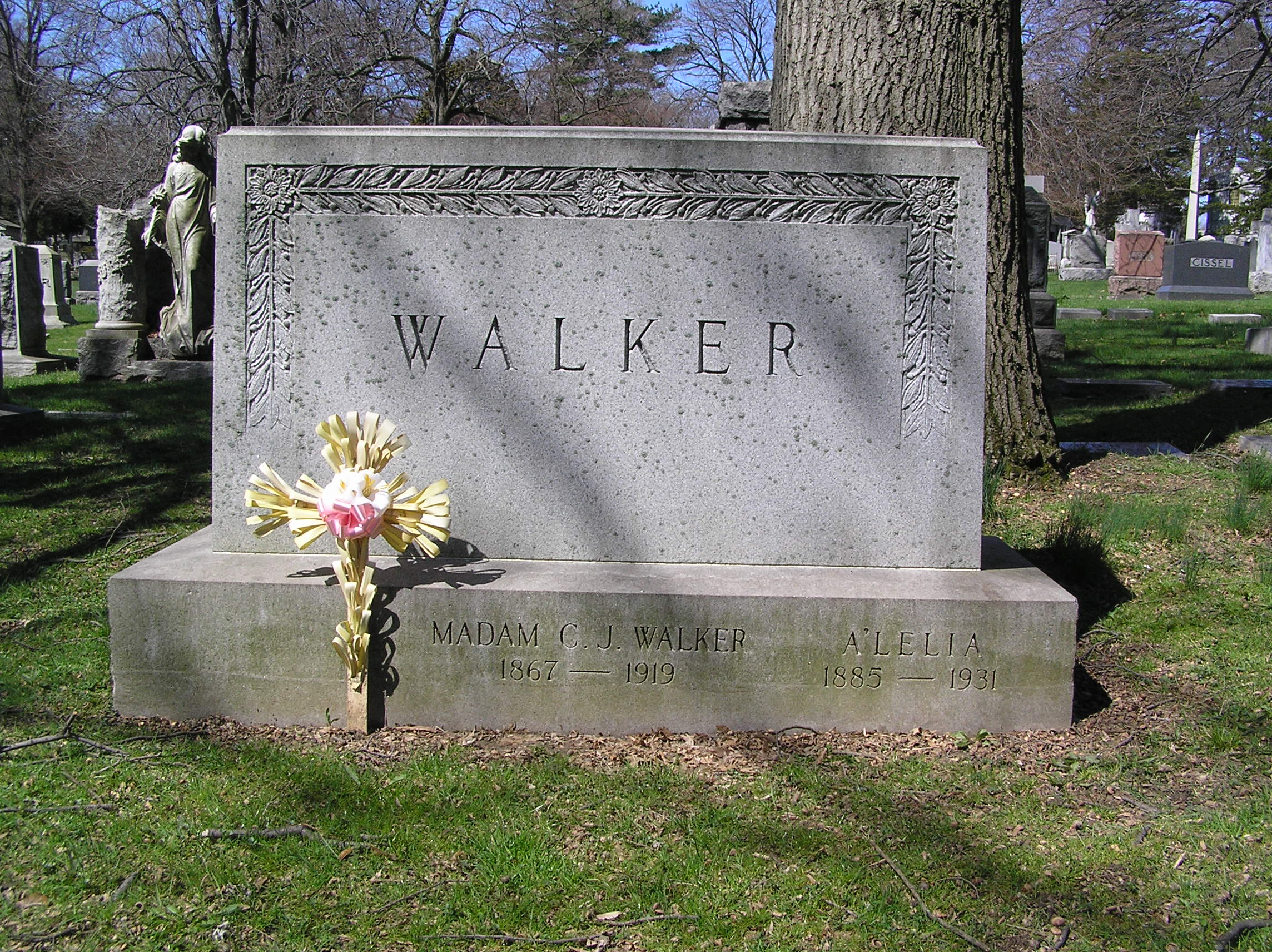
The grave of Madam C. J. Walker

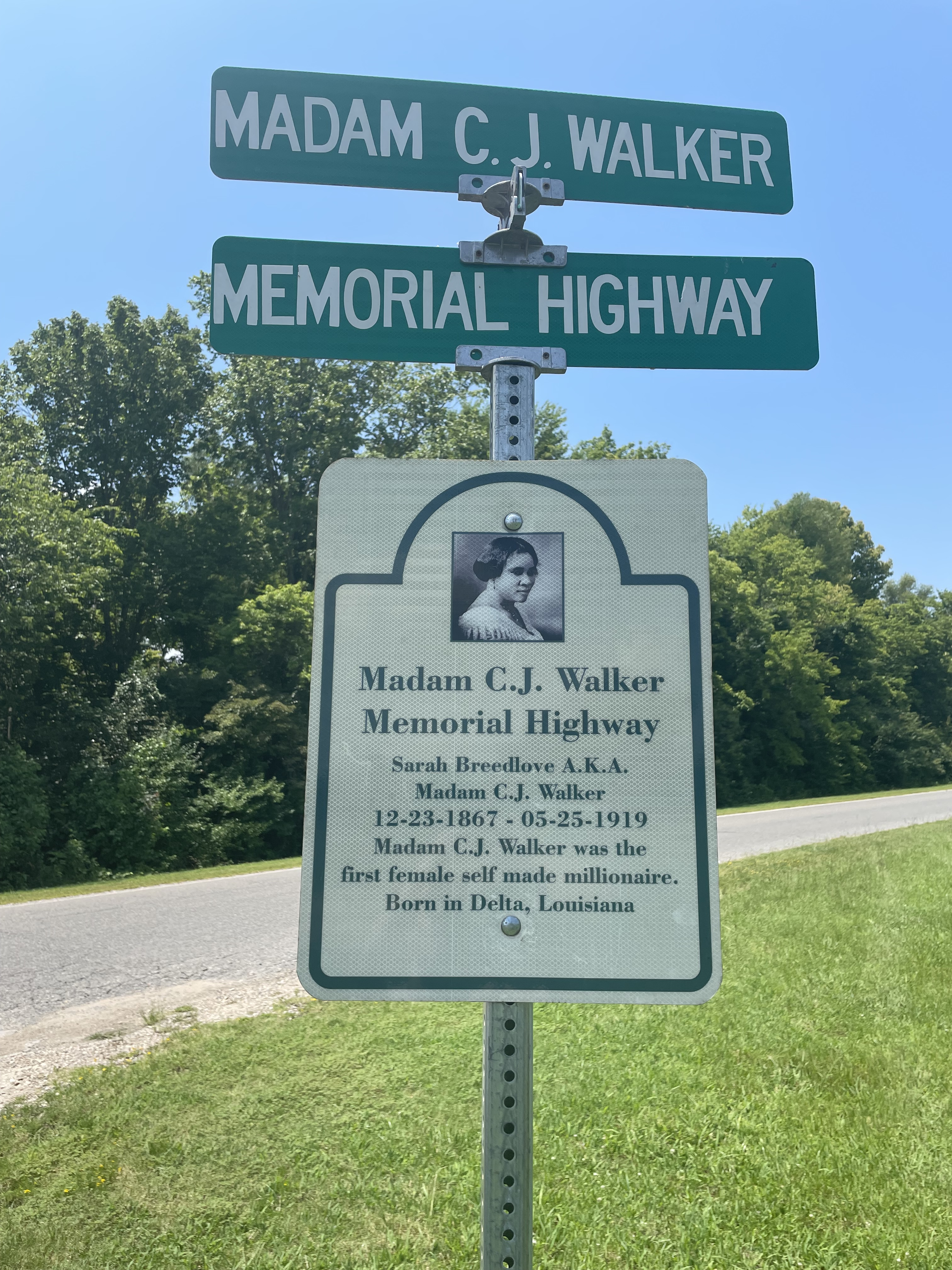
Sign on the Madam C. J. Walker memorial portion of Highway 80 in Delta, Louisiana

In November 1917, Walker was diagnosed with nephritis (kidney inflammation). She died on May 25, 1919, from kidney failure and complications of hypertension at the age of 51. Her remains are interred in Woodlawn Cemetery in the Bronx, New York City.

At the time of her death, Walker was considered worth between a half million and a million dollars. Walker was the wealthiest African-American woman in America. According to Walker's obituary in The New York Times, "she said herself two years ago [in 1917] that she was not yet a millionaire, but hoped to be some time, not that she wanted the money for herself, but for the good she could do with it." The obituary also noted that same year, her $250,000 mansion was completed at the banks of the Hudson at Irvington. Her daughter, A'Lelia Walker, later became the president of the Madam C. J. Walker Manufacturing Company.

The Indiana Historical Society preserves Walker's papers in Indianapolis. Walker's legacy also continues through two properties listed on the National Register of Historic Places: Villa Lewaro in Irvington, New York, and the Madame Walker Theatre Center in Indianapolis. A fraternal organization called the Companions of the Forest in America, an auxiliary to the Foresters of America, an offshoot of Foresters Financial, purchased Villa Lewaro following A'Lelia Walker's death in 1932. The National Register of Historic Places listed the house in 1979. The National Trust for Historic Preservation has designated the privately owned property a National Treasure.

Indianapolis's Walker Manufacturing Company headquarters building (renamed the Madame Walker Theatre Center) opened in December 1927. It included the company's offices and factory, a theater, a beauty school, a hair salon and barbershop, a restaurant, a drugstore, and a ballroom for the community. The National Register of Historic Places listed the building in 1980.

A museum devoted to Walker, as well as historic radio station WERD, established itself on the site of a former Madam C. J. Walker Beauty Shoppe in Atlanta.

In 2006, playwright and director Regina Taylor wrote The Dreams of Sarah Breedlove, recounting the history of Walker's struggles and success. The play premiered at the Goodman Theatre in Chicago. Actress L. Scott Caldwell played the role of Walker.

On January 31, 2022, Sundial Brands, a division of Unilever, launched a collection of eleven new products under the brand name "MADAM by Madam C. J. Walker" and sold exclusively at Walmart. These products replace the line that was launched on March 4, 2016, by Sundial Brands, a skincare and haircare company, in collaboration with Sephora in honor of Walker's legacy. The line "Madam C. J. Walker Beauty Culture" comprised four collections focused on using natural ingredients to care for different hair types.

In September 2025, Walker was the subject of an episode of BBC Radio 4's podcast series History's Heroes.

=== Television series ===
In 2020, actress Octavia Spencer committed to portraying Walker in a television series based on On Her Own Ground, the biography of Walker written by Walker's great-great-granddaughter, A'Lelia Bundles. The series is called Self Made: Inspired by the Life of Madam C. J. Walker. Reviews for the series were mixed, partly because of the inaccuracies of the storyline that created more of a fictional work than an authentic biography. The portrayal of Annie Malone as Addie Monroe, another black female self-made millionaire as a villain and the daughter of Walker as a lesbian were some of the complaints by audiences. Biographer A'Lelia Bundles wrote about the behind-the-scenes experience of producing Self Made in "Netflix's Self-Made Suffers from Self-Inflicted Wounds".

=== Documentary ===
Walker is featured in Stanley Nelson's 1987 documentary, Two Dollars and a Dream, the first film treatment of Walker's life. As the grandson of Freeman B. Ransom, Walker's attorney and Walker Company general manager, Nelson had access to the original Walker business records and former Walker Company employees he interviewed during the 1980s.

== Tributes ==
Various organizations have named scholarships and awards in Walker's honor:

- The Madam C. J. Walker Business and Community Recognition Awards are sponsored by the National Coalition of 100 Black Women, Oakland / Bay Area chapter. An annual luncheon honors Walker and awards scholarships to outstanding women in the community.
- Spirit Awards have sponsored the Madame Walker Theatre Center in Indianapolis. Established as a tribute to Walker, the annual award has honored national leaders in entrepreneurship, philanthropy, civic engagement, and the arts since 2006. Awards presented to individuals include the Madame C. J. Walker Heritage Award and Young Entrepreneur and Legacy prizes.

The National Women's Hall of Fame in Seneca Falls, New York, inducted Walker in 1993. In 1998, the U.S. Postal Service issued a Madam Walker commemorative stamp as part of its Black Heritage Series. In 2022, Mattel issued a Madam C.J. Walker Barbie doll as part of their Inspiring Women doll collection.

== See also ==
- List of people from Harlem
