= National Archives Foundation =

Non-profit related to NARA

The National Archives Foundation is an independent non-profit organization that works to increase public awareness of and showcase the United States National Archives and Records Administration.

It was founded in 1992 as the Foundation for the National Archives. and gained its current name in 2015.
