= Annie Turnbo Malone =

American businesswoman (1877–1957)

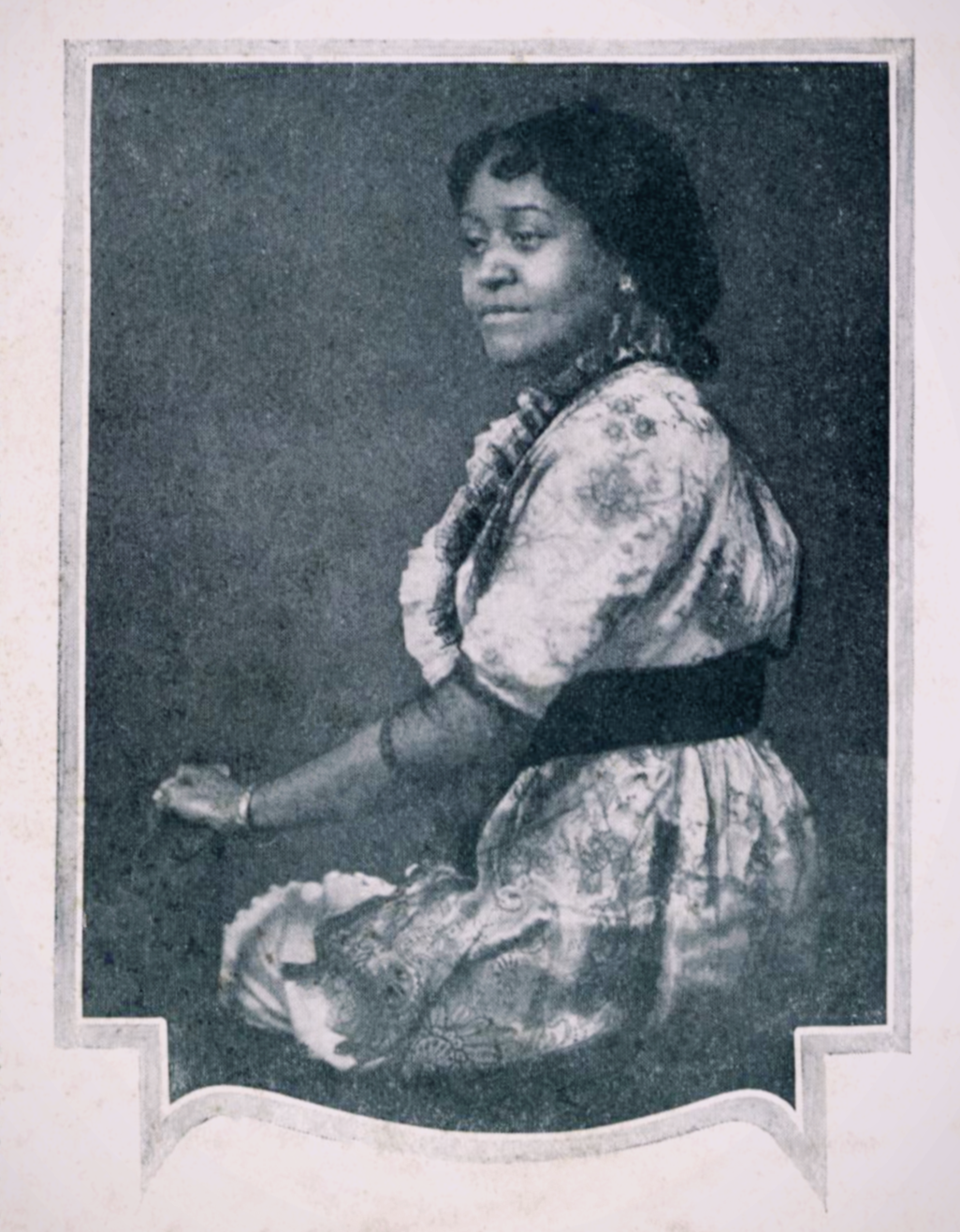
- Annie Malone in a Poro College souvenir booklet, 1920–1927
- Born: Annie Minerva Turnbo; August 9, 1877; Metropolis, Illinois, U.S.
- Died: May 10, 1957 (aged 79); Chicago, Illinois, U.S.
- Resting place: Burr Oak Cemetery, Alsip, Illinois
- Other name: Annie Malone
- Occupations: Businesswoman, inventor
- Known for: Development of mail-order process for beauty care products. African American philanthropy. Mentorship of Madam C. J. Walker. Community developer
- Spouses: Nelson Pope (m. 1902; div. 1907); Aaron Eugene Malone (m. 1914; div. 1927)

Annie Minerva Turnbo Malone (August 9, 1877 (Note: Turnbo Malone's year of birth has most often been reported as 1869. However, this is unlikely. Malone is not present with her family in the 1870 census and her older brother is shown to have been born about 1869. (Ancestry.com. 1870 United States Federal Census [database on-line]. Provo, UT, USA: Ancestry.com Operations, Inc., 2009. Images reproduced by FamilySearch. Census Place: Township 15 Range 5, Massac, Illinois; Roll: M593_255; Page: 272B; Family History Library Film: 545754.) Turnbo first appears in the 1900 census in which her mon th and year of birth are given as August 1877.) – May 10, 1957) was an American businesswoman, inventor and philanthropist. In the first three decades of the 20th century, she founded and developed a large and prominent commercial and educational enterprise centered on cosmetics for African-American women based in St. Louis, Missouri.

With her wealth from business success, Annie Malone became a major philanthropist, helping support local and national institutions that aided, educated and advanced Black children and families. A street in St. Louis was renamed for her, as was a social services agency that developed from an orphanage she helped found.

== Early life ==
Annie Minerva Turnbo was born in Metropolis, Illinois, the daughter of Robert and Isabella Turnbo, who had formerly been enslaved in Kentucky. Robert served with the Union 1st Kentucky Cavalry in the Civil War. Isabella took the couple's children and escaped from Kentucky, a neutral border state that was maintaining slavery.

After traveling down the Ohio River, she found refuge in Metropolis, Illinois, as the state was free. She was reunited with her husband. Years later, Annie Turnbo was born on a farm near Metropolis in Massac County, Illinois, the tenth of eleven children.

Orphaned at a young age, Turnbo lived with older siblings and attended a public school in Metropolis. In 1896 she moved to live with her older married sister Ada Moody in Peoria. Turnbo attended high school there, taking a particular interest in chemistry. However, due to frequent illness, she was forced to withdraw from classes.

While out of school, Turnbo grew so fascinated with hair and hair care that she often practiced hairdressing with her sister. With expertise in both chemistry and hair care, Turnbo began to develop her own hair-care products. At the time, many women used goose fat, heavy oils, soap, or bacon grease to straighten their curls, which damaged both scalp and hair.

== Career ==
By the beginning of the 1900s, Turnbo moved with her older siblings to Lovejoy, now known as Brooklyn, Illinois. While experimenting with hair and different hair-care products, she developed and manufactured her own line of non-damaging hair straighteners, special oils, and hair-stimulant products for African-American women. She named her new product "Wonderful Hair Grower". To promote her new product, Turnbo sold the Wonderful Hair Grower in bottles door-to-door. Her products and sales began to revolutionize hair-care methods for African Americans.

In 1902, Turnbo moved to a thriving St. Louis, settling in Mill Creek Valley. She and three employees sold her hair-care products door-to-door. As part of her marketing, she gave away free treatments to attract more customers.

Due to the high demand for her product in St. Louis, Turnbo opened her first shop in 1902 at 2223 Market Street. She also launched a wide advertising campaign in the black press, held news conferences, toured many southern states, and recruited many women whom she trained to sell her products.

One of her selling agents, Sarah Breedlove Davis, later known as Madam C. J. Walker, operated first in St. Louis. She later moved to Denver, Colorado, where she continued to sell Turnbo products. After a disagreement, Walker left the company. She allegedly took the original Poro formula and created her own brand of it (this is disputed).

This development was one of the reasons that Turnbo copyrighted her products under the name "Poro" - because of what she called fraudulent imitations and to discourage counterfeit versions. Author John Whitfield noted that this is a combination of the married names of Annie Pope (she had married in 1902) and her sister Laura Roberts. (Other sources have said it may have been derived from a word in Mende, an African language.)

Due to the growth in her business, in 1910 Turnbo moved to a larger facility on 3100 Pine Street. In 1914 she married again, and was known in St. Louis as Annie Malone.

=== Poro College ===
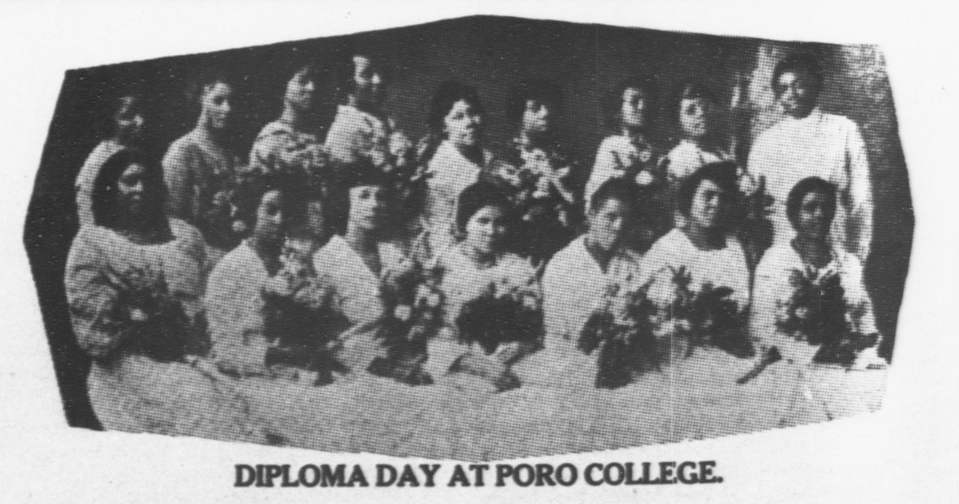
Diploma Day at Poro College, 1920

In 1918, Malone established Poro College, a cosmetology school and center. The building included a manufacturing plant, a retail store where Poro products were sold, and business offices. It also had a 500-seat auditorium, dining and meeting rooms, a roof garden, dormitory, gymnasium, bakery, and chapel. It served the African-American community as a center for religious and social functions.

The college curriculum addressed the whole student: students were coached on personal style for work, on walking, talking, and a style of dress designed to maintain a solid persona.

Poro College employed nearly 200 people in St. Louis. Through its school and franchise businesses, the college created jobs for almost 75,000 women in North and South America, Africa and the Philippines.

Malone's business thrived until 1927, when her husband filed for divorce. Having served as president of the company, he demanded half of the business's value, based on his claim that his contributions had been integral to its success.

The divorce suit forced Poro College into court-ordered receivership. With support from her employees and powerful figures such as Mary McLeod Bethune, Turnbo Malone negotiated a settlement of $200,000. This affirmed her as the sole owner of Poro College, and the divorce was granted.

After the divorce, Turnbo moved most of her business to Chicago's South Parkway (now Martin Luther King Jr. Drive), where she bought an entire city block. Other lawsuits followed. In 1937, during the Great Depression, a former employee filed suit, also claiming credit for Poro's success. To raise money for the settlement, Turnbo Malone sold her St. Louis property. Although much reduced in size, her business continued to thrive.

== Marriage and philanthropy ==
Malone c. 1920–1935

In 1902 she married Nelson Pope. The couple divorced in 1907.

On April 28, 1914, Annie Turnbo married Aaron Eugene Malone, a former teacher and religious book salesman. He became involved in her business, serving as president of the company. They divorced in 1927.

By the 1920s, Annie Turnbo Malone had become a multi-millionaire. In 1924 she paid income tax of nearly $40,000, reportedly the highest in Missouri. While extremely wealthy, Malone lived modestly.

She became a philanthropist, donating to causes to aid African Americans. For instance, she gave thousands of dollars to the local black YMCA and the Howard University College of Medicine in Washington, D.C.

She made a founding $10,000 contribution to help establish the St. Louis Colored Orphans Home. She served as president on the board of directors from 1919 to 1943. With her help, in 1922 the Home bought a facility at 2612 Goode Avenue. The street was renamed Annie Malone Drive in her honor.

The Orphans Home is located in the historic Ville neighborhood. Upgraded and expanded, the facility was renamed in the entrepreneur's honor as the Annie Malone Children and Family Service Center. This also suggests its contemporary practices, to serve short-term crisis housing needs and to focus on long-term support of families in a variety of ways.

Turnbo Malone ensured that her employees, all African American, were paid well and given opportunities for advancement. She especially wanted to support young women in making careers.

== Honors, death and legacy ==
Turnbo was named an honorary member of Zeta Phi Beta sorority. and was awarded an honorary degree from Howard University.

On May 10, 1957, Annie Turnbo suffered a stroke and died at Chicago's Provident Hospital. Childless, she had bequeathed her business and remaining fortune to her nieces and nephews. At the time of her death, her estate was valued at $100,000.

St. Louis has an annual Annie Malone parade in support of children's charities.

== In media ==
A fictionalized version of Malone is portrayed by British actress Carmen Ejogo in the 2020 Netflix miniseries Self Made. In this version, the character is renamed Addie Munroe.

Turnbo is featured in Bayer Mack's 2019 documentary, No Lye: An American Beauty Story, which chronicles the rise and decline of the black-owned ethnic beauty industry.
