= List of Crispus Attucks High School alumni =

The following people are notable alumni of Crispus Attucks High School in Indianapolis, Indiana, organized into rough professional areas.

== Art and architecture ==
- Emmett I. Brown Jr, photographer
- Edwin A. Gibson, architect
- Felrath Hines (1913–1993), visual artist and art conservator

== Education ==
- Wilma Gibbs Moore, librarian and archivist

== Entertainment ==
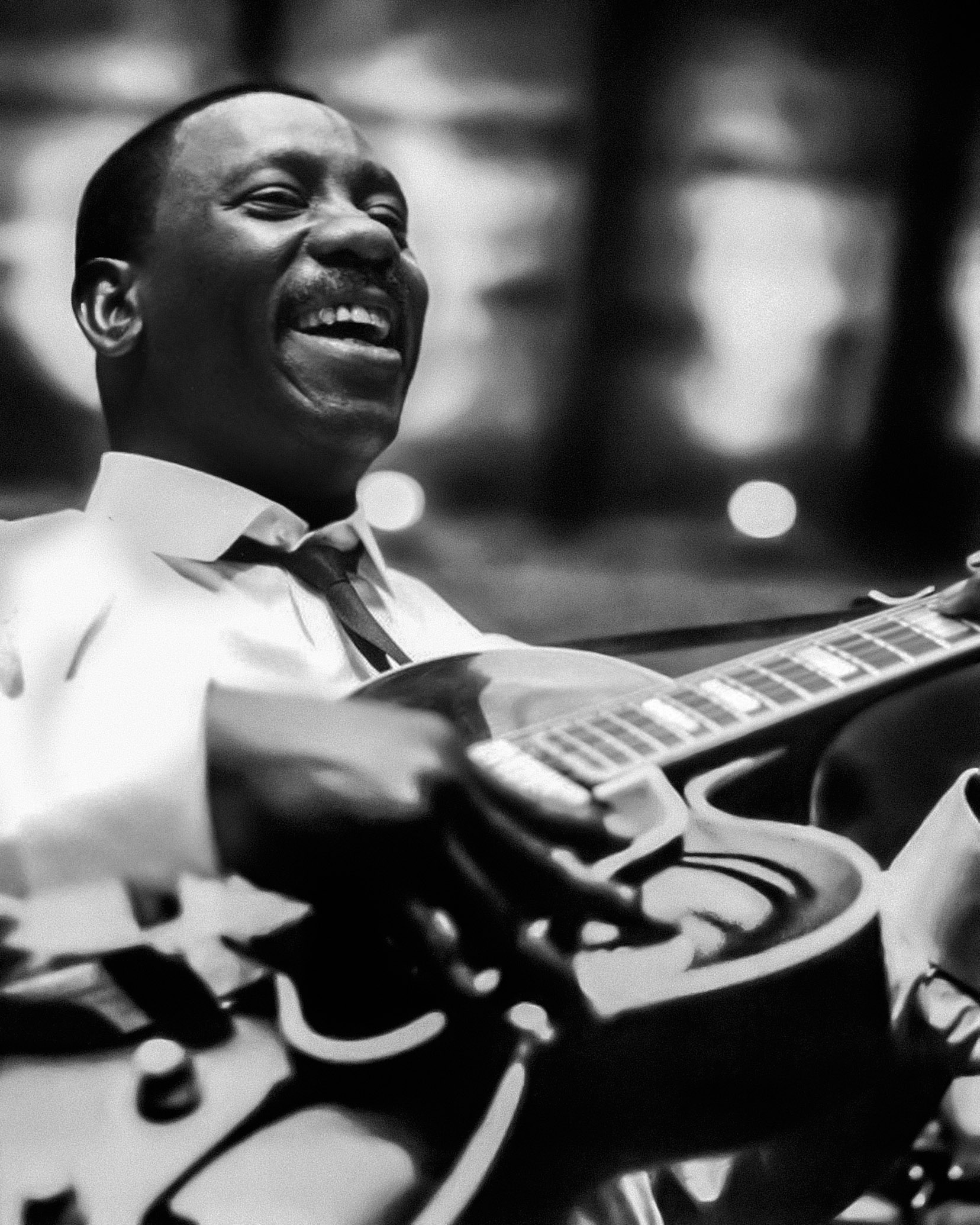
Wes Montgomery

- David Baker, jazz musician and composer; founder and chair of Indiana University Bloomington's jazz studies program
- Nerissa Brokenburr Stickney, pianist and music educator
- Angela Brown, dramatic soprano
- The Counts, rhythm and blues and "doo-wop" band
- Erroll Grandy, jazz musician
- J. J. Johnson, jazz musician and composer
- Wes Montgomery, jazz musician
- James Spaulding, jazz musician
- Meshach Taylor, actor

== Government and politics ==
- Julia Carson, politician
- Charles DeBow, Tuskegee Airman
- Graham E. Martin, Naval officer and educator
- Norris Overton, brigadier general in the United States Air Force
- Paul Parks, civil engineer and public servant
- Joseph W. Summers, politician
- Charles A. Walton, lawyer and Indiana state legislator

== Law ==
- Harriette Bailey Conn, politician, lawyer, and Indiana public defender
- Willard Ransom, lawyer, businessman, community civic leader, and civil rights activist

== Literature and journalism ==
- Janet Langhart-Cohen, writer and journalist

== Sports ==
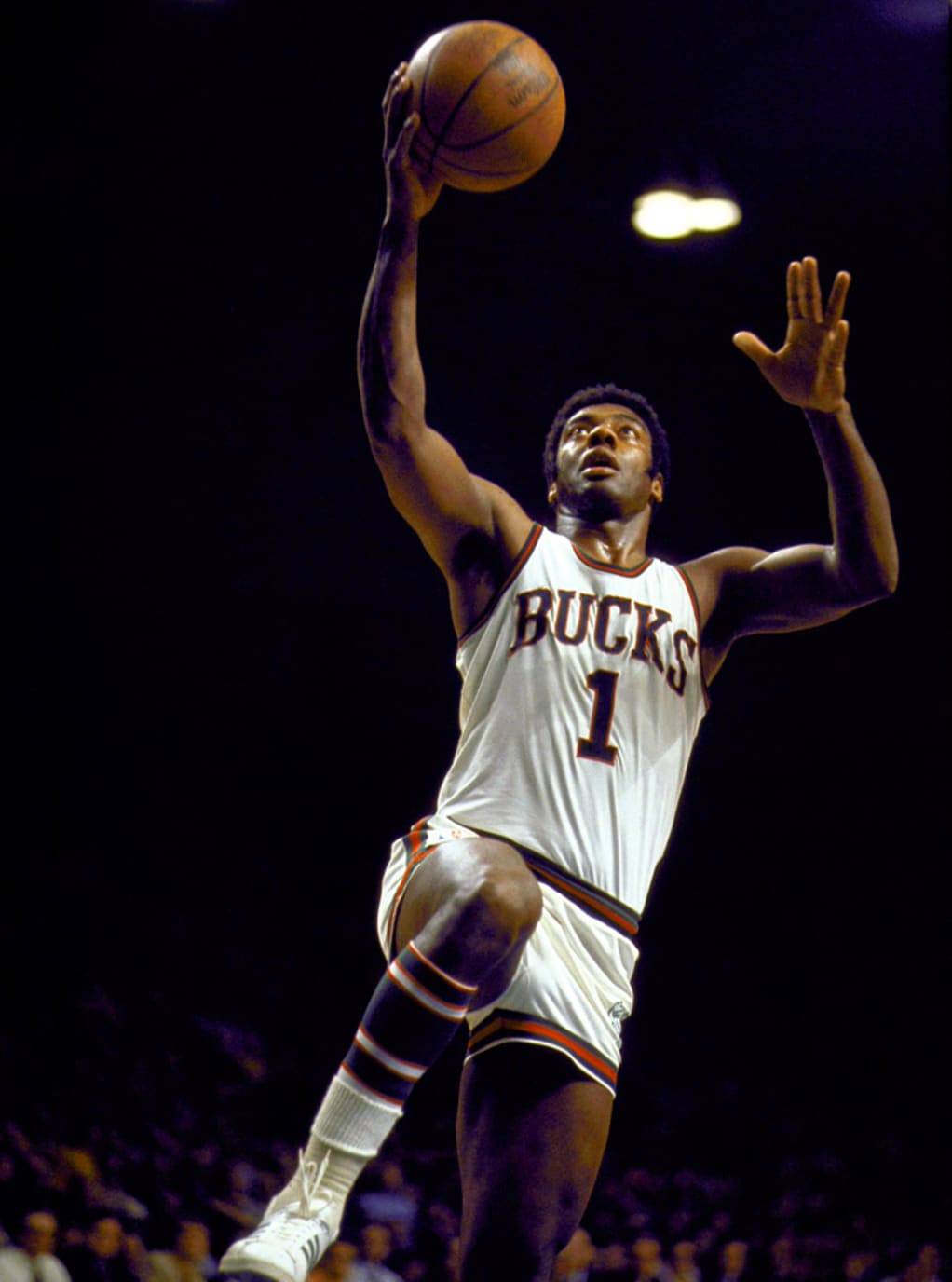
Oscar Robertson

- Ron Dorsey (born 1948), professional basketball forward in the American Basketball Association
- Bobby Edmonds (1941–1991), professional basketball forward in the American Basketball Association
- Marvin Johnson (born 1954), three-time world light heavyweight champion boxer
- Oscar Robertson (born 1938), professional NBA basketball guard and Hall of Famer
- Nike Sibande (born 1999), basketball guard in the Israeli Basketball Premier League
- JoAnne Terry (born 1938), Olympic hurdler
