= Brokenburr =

Brokenburr is a surname. Notable people with the surname include:

- Kenny Brokenburr (born 1968), American sprinter
- Robert Brokenburr (1886–1974), American attorney, civil rights leader and politician
- Nerissa Brokenburr Stickney (1913–1960), American pianist and music educator
