= Untitled (Jazz Musicians) =

1995 sculpture by John Spaulding

Coordinates: 39°46.544′N 86°09.992′W

- Artist: John Spaulding
- Year: 1995
- Type: Bronze
- Dimensions: 2.57 m × 5.8 m × 5.8 m (8 ft 5 in × 19 ft × 19 ft)
- Location: Indiana University-Purdue University Indianapolis, Indianapolis, Indiana, United States

Untitled (Jazz Musicians) is an outdoor sculpture by American artist John Spaulding. It is located on the border of Indiana University-Purdue University Indianapolis (IUPUI) campus, near downtown Indianapolis, Indiana, at the corner intersection of Indiana Avenue and West Street. The sculpture faces the historic Madam Walker Legacy Center, which is located across the street.

== Description ==
Untitled (Jazz Musicians) is a quintet of linear jazz musicians fabricated in bronze. Each figure represents a jazz musician who was influential to the artist, and Indiana Avenue. Spaulding's father, James, is playing guitar; his older brother, James Spaulding Jr., is playing saxophone; the bass-player figure represents Larry Ridley; Freddie Hubbard is on trumpet; and "Killer" Ray Appleton is on the drums.

Each bronze linear figure has a circular bronze base welded at its feet that is then situated upon a riser of concrete block. The dimensions of the sculpture as a whole are 8'5" x 19' x 19' (3 x 6 x 6 m). Each sculpture base is circular, approximately 1'6" (46 cm) in diameter and 1" (25 mm) in height. Each figure, not including its base, has a height of 8'5" (2.6 m). The exception is the seated drummer figure, which is approximately 4'6" (1.4 m) in height. Each figure has different width as follows: The saxophone player is 1'5" (43 cm) wide, the bass player is 3'1" (94 cm) wide, the drummer is 3'11" (119 cm) wide, the trumpet player figure is 2'8" (81 cm) wide, and the guitarist is 2'3" (69 cm) wide.

== Location and history ==
Untitled (Jazz Musicians) was fabricated in 1995 and was commissioned by the Sexton Companies.

The sculpture stands at the corner of West Street and Indiana Avenue, across from the historic Madam Walker Legacy Center. The outdoor sculpture is displayed in an area in front of the Gardens of Canal Court apartments. It is a tribute to the rich Jazz heritage that was a part of the Indiana Avenue area. The location of Untitled (Jazz Musicians) reflects the spirit of this sculpture. Facing West Street, Indiana Avenue, and the Madam Walker Legacy Center, it reminds all those who pass of the rich cultural heritage that was and is part of this area near the IUPUI campus.

Further west is another of Spaulding's sculptures, Jammin' on the Avenue, which is installed at the entrance to historic Lockefield Gardens apartments, where the artist was born. Lockefield Gardens was the city's first major public housing project, which was racially segregated at first, in the heart of Indianapolis's African American community. New construction and renovation of Lockefield Gardens' seven remaining historic buildings are home to IUPUI students, staff, faculty, and anyone wishing to live in this cultural area, known as the Indiana Avenue Cultural District.

== Vandalism ==
In May 2011, the figure representing a saxophone player was broken off at the knees and stolen. The sculpture also suffered several other cuts. A local newspaper reported on June 13, 2011, that police recovered the piece after it was discovered in a trash bin and brought to a scrap yard for sale.

== Documentation ==
A Museum Studies course at IUPUI in collections care and management undertook the project of researching and reporting on the condition of 40 outdoor sculptures on the university campus. This documentation was influenced by the successful Save Outdoor Sculpture!, a 1989 campaign organized by Heritage Preservation: The National Institute of Conservation in partnership with the Smithsonian American Art Museum. Throughout the 1990s, over 7,000 volunteers nationwide have cataloged and assessed the condition of over 30,000 publicly accessible statues, monuments, and sculptures installed as outdoor public art across the United States.
