= Black Titan =

- Artist: John Spaulding
- Year: 1985
- Type: Coated bronze, concrete
- Dimensions: 71 cm × 53 cm × 71 cm (28 in × 21 in × 28 in)
- Location: Indy Art Center, Indianapolis, Indiana, United States; 39°52′41″N 86°8′36″W
- Owner: Indy Art Center

Black Titan, is a public artwork by American artist John Spaulding, located on the grounds of the Indy Art Center, which is in Indianapolis, Indiana, United States.

== Background ==
Before the piece was installed at the Indy Art Center, it was exhibited at shows in New York, followed by Indiana Black Expo in 1985 and The Children's Museum of Indianapolis. Artist John Spaulding originally wanted the sculpture to depict a 16-foot-tall boxer. However, the proposed piece was too expensive, so he created a bust of a boxer, instead. The sculpture took one year to create.

== Description ==
The sculpture is a cast bronze bust of a black boxer in his early twenties. His features are dramatic - bulging eyes, a large nose, and large ears. His hair is short and cropped. The bust sits upon a concrete base (approx. 37 × 40½ × 54 inches).

The sculpture's concrete base has an inscription reading: By/John/Spaulding.

== Location Information ==
The Indy Art Center owns the piece which is part of the center's ARTSPARK. The ARTSPARK was designed by Michael Graves with the intention of melding art creation with outdoor gallery space.

The Indy Art Center began in 1934 as the Indianapolis Art League. It moved to the Broad Ripple neighborhood north of downtown Indianapolis in 1976. In 1994, the name was changed to the Indianapolis Art Center in order to demonstrate the organization's philosophy of inclusion.

== See also ==
- Jammin' on the Avenue by Spaulding
- Untitled (Jazz Musicians) by Spaulding
