= Jammin' on the Avenue =

Outdoor sculpture by American artist John Spaulding

Coordinates: 39°46.646′N 86°10.206′W

- Artist: John Spaulding
- Year: 1989
- Type: Brass
- Dimensions: 2.90 m × 1.2 m × 1.2 m (9 ft 6 in × 4 ft × 4 ft)
- Location: Indiana University-Purdue University Indianapolis, Indianapolis, Indiana, United States

Jammin' on the Avenue is an outdoor sculpture by American artist John Spaulding. It is located on the border of the Indiana University-Purdue University Indianapolis (IUPUI) campus, which is near downtown Indianapolis, Indiana, at the intersection of Indiana Avenue, North Street, and Blackford Street. The historic Lockefield Gardens apartments flank the sculpture to its back. Madam Walker Legacy Center is located across the street. This sculpture is documented in the Smithsonian's Save Outdoor Sculpture! database, which is the inspiration for this project.

== Description ==
The sculpture is a collage of brass wind instruments welded together and arranged in a square column. Instruments consist of saxophones, sousaphones, trombones, trumpets, and tubas. The sculpture sits in a fountain basin, which has non-chlorinated running water and illumination for the sculpture. The fountain basin is a large trapezoidal shape and the sculpture is set in its most central point. The basin is made of cement and tile. The dimensions of the sculpture are 9'6" × 4' × 4'. The dimensions of the fountain basin are approximately 26" × 35'6" × 70'.

== Information ==
Jammin' on the Avenue, fabricated in 1989, was commissioned by the Sexton Companies. The sculpture stands at the south entrance to the new section of Lockefield Gardens. It is a tribute to the rich jazz and musical heritage that was a part of the Indiana Avenue cultural district.

== Location history ==
The location of Jammin' on the Avenue reflects the spirit of this sculpture. It faces Indiana Avenue and the Madam Walker Legacy Center to remind all those who pass of the rich cultural heritage that was and still is a part of this area near the IUPUI campus. The sculpture's location in front of Lockefield Gardens is also significant because the artist was born here. Lockefield Gardens was a public housing project built in 1938. New construction has been added to seven surviving historic buildings, which have been renovated, to create the Lockefield Gardens apartment complex. The sculpture can be found at the south entrance to the complex, which is home to IUPUI students, staff, faculty, and anyone who want to live in this historic and cultural tapestry. Another Spaulding sculpture, Untitled (Jazz Musicians), stands nearby on West Street, across from the Madam Walker Legacy Center.

== Documentation ==
A Museum Studies course at IUPUI in collections care and management recently undertook the project of researching and reporting on the condition of 40 outdoor sculptures on the university campus. This documentation was influenced by the successful Save Outdoor Sculpture!, a 1989 campaign organized by Heritage Preservation: The National Institute of Conservation in partnership with the Smithsonian American Art Museum. Throughout the 1990s, over 7,000 volunteers in the U.S. have cataloged and assessed the condition of more than 30,000 publicly accessible statues, monuments, and sculptures installed as outdoor public art across the United States.

== See also ==
- List of public art in Indianapolis
