= John Spaulding (artist) =

American artist (1942–2004)

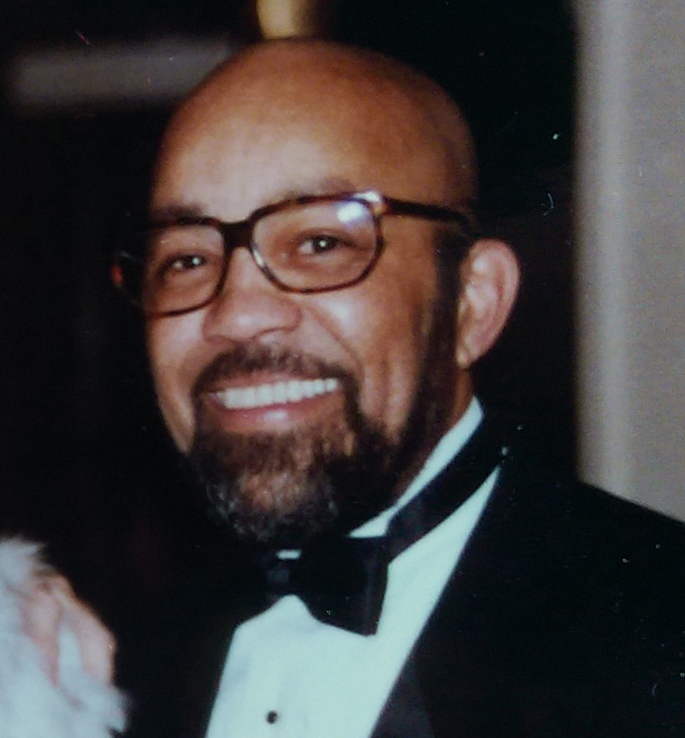
- John Spaulding (1992)
- Born: John Andrew Spaulding; October 18, 1942; Indianapolis, Indiana, United States
- Died: July 10, 2004 (aged 61); Phoenix, Arizona
- Education: Self-taught
- Known for: Sculpture
- Notable work: Black Titan, Untitled (Jazz Musicians), Jammin' on the Avenue
- Movement: Contemporary, Abstract
- Awards: The New York Brass Conference for Scholarships, National Endowment for the Arts Fellowship
- Patrons: Lilly Endowment

John A. Spaulding (October 18, 1942 – July 10, 2004) was an American artist and sculptor from Indianapolis, Indiana. He was born in Lockefield Gardens, an Indianapolis public housing project on Indiana Avenue, which was known for its jazz clubs. Two of Spaulding's sculptures, Jammin' on the Avenue and Untitled (Jazz Musicians), are located near his birthplace and celebrate the area's musical heritage.

Spaulding was the fifth of seven children. He attended Indianapolis Public Schools 24 and 26 and Arsenal Technical High School. He was a self-taught welder. Spaulding worked part-time on his art, while working as a metal-joining specialist in the aerospace industry in California in the 1960s. He relocated to New York City in 1978 and continued to work on his art. Spaulding's work is internationally recognized, with pieces on display in several countries including Brazil, Japan, France, and England. He had studios for creating his works in California, New York, Rio de Janeiro, and Indianapolis. His sculptures have been inspired by nature and his African American heritage. He also created several large abstracts. Spaulding's work is included in private and public collections such as Black Titan at the Indianapolis Art Center's ArtsPark. The artist died on July 10, 2004, in Phoenix, Arizona.

== Selected works ==
- Black Titan, Indianapolis, Indiana
- Untitled (Jazz Musicians), Indianapolis, Indiana
- Jammin' on the Avenue, Indianapolis, Indiana

== See also ==
- James Spaulding Jr., his brother, a jazz musician
