= Ransom Place Historic District =

Historic district in Indianapolis, Indiana, US

- U.S. National Register of Historic Places
- U.S. Historic district
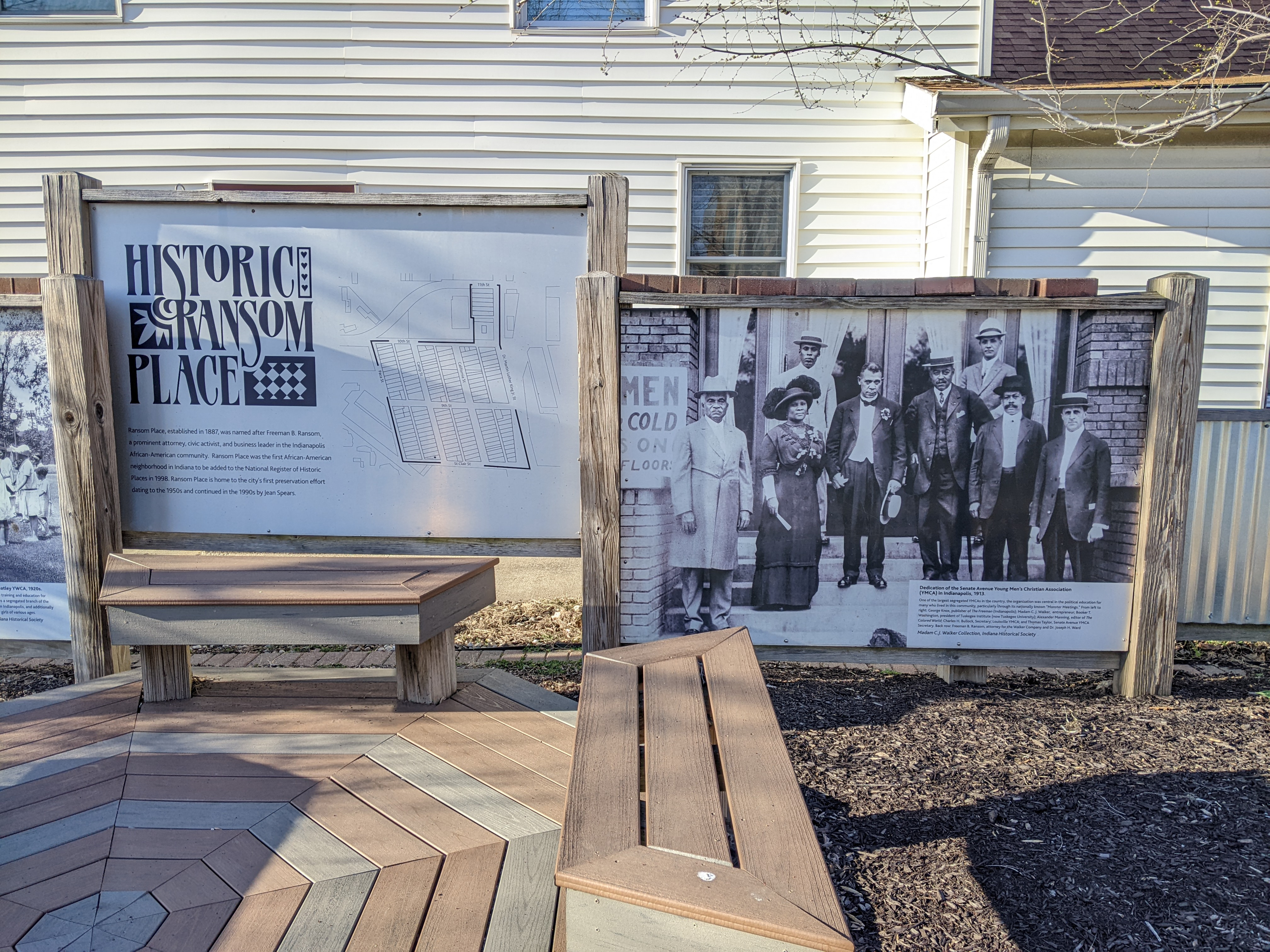
- Section of the Ransom Place historical marker at the corner of St. Clair and Camp streets in Indianapolis

- Location within Indianapolis Location within Indianapolis Location within Indiana Location within the United States
- Location: Roughly bounded by 10th, St. Clair, West and Paca Sts., Indianapolis, Indiana
- Coordinates: 39°46′44″N 86°10′11″W
- Area: 6 acres (2.4 ha)
- Architectural style: Queen Anne, L-Plan Cottage
- NRHP reference No.: 92001650
- Added to NRHP: December 10, 1992

Ransom Place Historic District is a national historic district in Indianapolis, Indiana, United States. The district consists mainly of a six-square block in a historically Black residential section of Indianapolis, located just one block from Indiana Avenue. It was originally developed during the 1880s and 1890s, coinciding with the growth of Indiana Avenue as the central commercial district for Indianapolis's Black population at that time. It was listed on the National Register of Historic Places in 1992.

== Historical significance ==
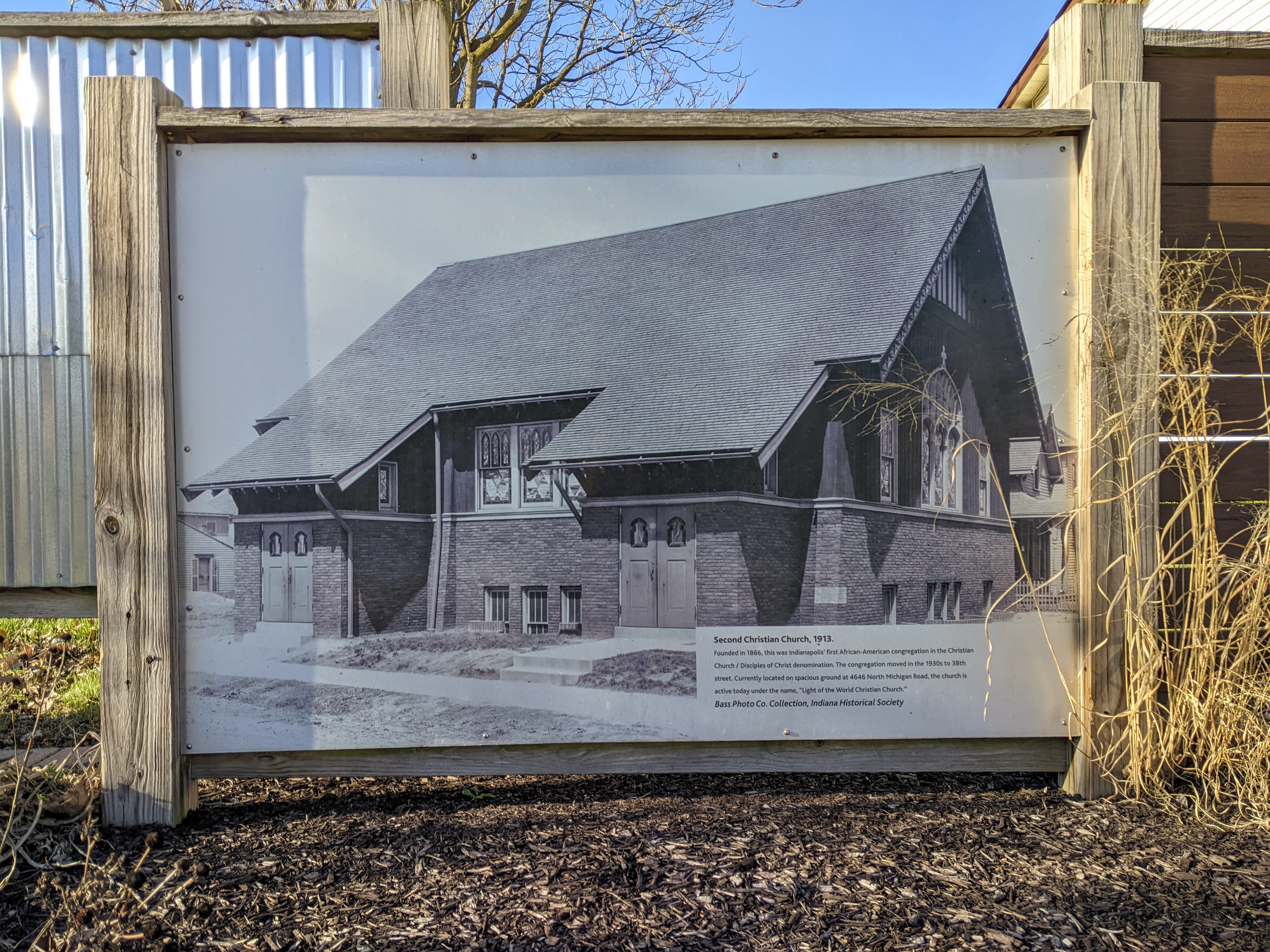
Panel of Ransom Place Historic Marker featuring Second Christian Church (photo taken in 1913)

At its peak, Ransom Place (although not known as "Ransom Place" at that time) was the site of numerous Black-owned businesses, including churches, clubs, community centers, restaurants, shops, and theaters. Many residents had prominent careers as well. The best-known resident of this area was Freeman Ransom, a lawyer, businessman, and civil rights activist who also worked with Madame C. J. Walker as her legal counsel and the general manager of her company. His son, Willard Ransom also lived in the neighborhood, and he worked as a local chapter president of the NAACP in the 1940s and 1950s.

The district was officially renamed to Ransom Place in 1992 in Freeman Ransom's honor. This district was designated as "most intact neighborhood associated with [the] city's African-American population" by the Indiana Historical Bureau in Ransom Place's historical marker.

== Decline and restoration ==
By the 1950s, when the Indiana Avenue community began to decline as other opportunities drew Black residents away, the area became a target for razing by the city of Indianapolis. Starting in the 1960s and continuing into the 1980s, city leaders worked with Indiana University–Purdue University Indianapolis (IUPUI) to clear land for the expansion of the university.

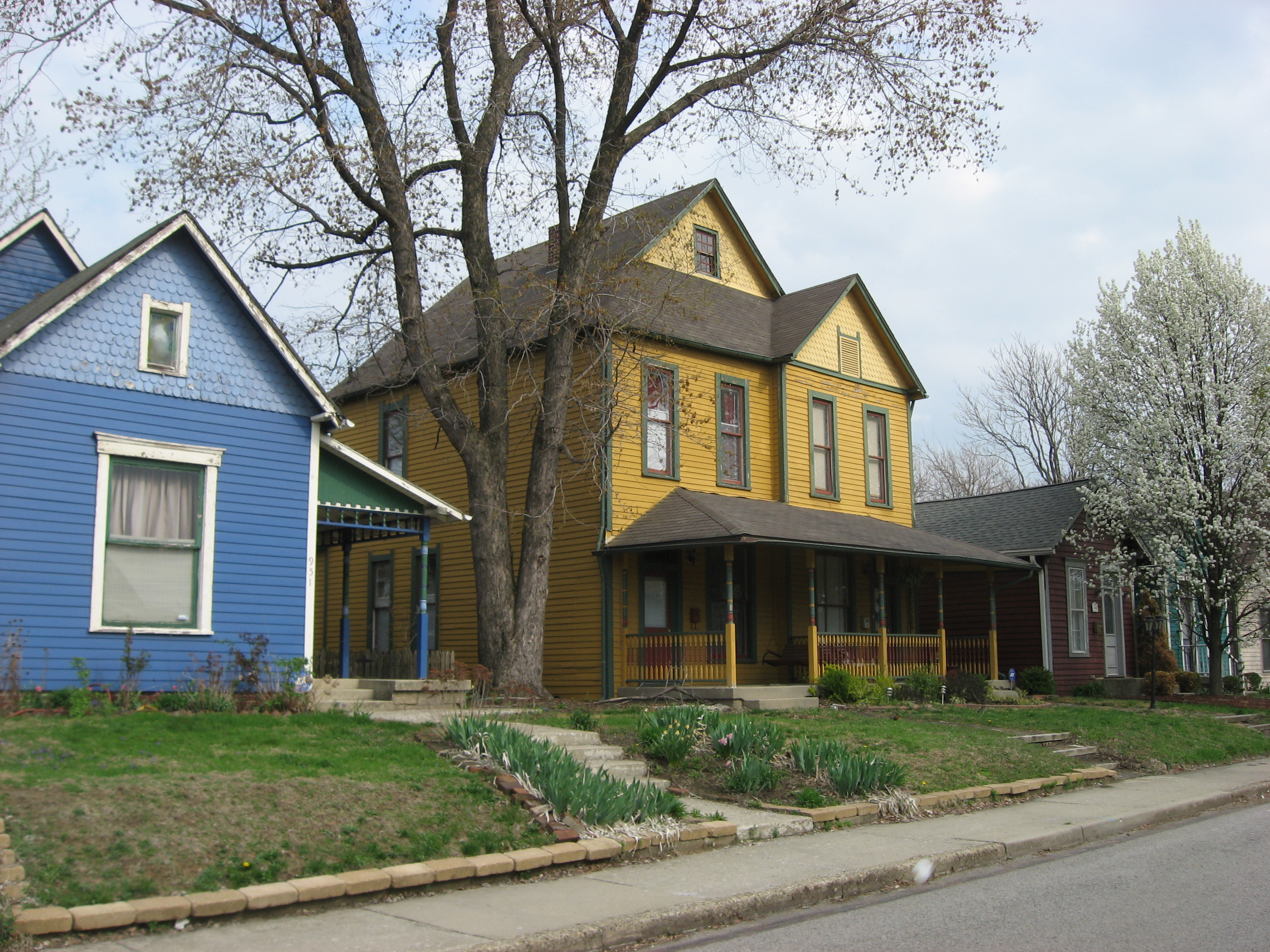
Houses along Camp Street in Ransom Place, taken in 2011

Due to community worry about the possibility of continued growth of IUPUI, residents Lathan Frayser, Addie Jones, Wilma Bailey, Mary Frisby, Jean Spears, and Teresa Crawford-Cottingham formed the Ransom Place Neighborhood Association (RPNA) in August 1991. This was the first recorded use of "Ransom Place" as the name of the district.

This nonprofit focused on encouraging preservation of Ransom Place homes and promoting the neighborhood's history. After gaining recognition on the National Register of Historic Places in 1992, the neighborhood experienced a revitalization effort throughout the rest of the decade. Today, the association hosts many community events, helps fund property improvements, and operates a community garden.

== Architecture ==
The architecture of the district includes many representative examples of Queen Anne style architecture. A notable building in this district is the former Second Christian Church, which was used from 1910 to 2003 until the congregation relocated to a new building near the Butler University campus.

== See also ==
- List of African-American neighborhoods
- List of neighborhoods in Indianapolis
- National Register of Historic Places listings in Center Township, Marion County, Indiana
