= Charles Walton =

Charles Walton may refer to:

- Charles Walton (inventor) (1921–2011), first patent holder for the RFID device
- Charles Walton (murder victim) (1870–1945), British murder victim
- Charles A. Walton (Toronto politician), Toronto councillor
- Charles A. Walton (Indiana politician) (1936–1996), Indiana lawyer and politician
- Charles D. Walton (born 1948), American politician from Rhode Island
- Charles W. Walton (Maine politician) (1819–1900), member of the US House of Representatives from Maine
- Charles W. Walton (New York politician) (1875–1945), New York state senator
- Charlie Walton (1947–2025), American politician from Kentucky
- Chuck Walton (1941–1998), American football guard
