= Willard Ransom =

- Born: Willard Blystone Ransom; May 17, 1916; Indianapolis, Indiana, U.S.
- Died: November 7, 1995 (aged 79); Indianapolis, Indiana, U.S.
- Other name: Mike Ransom
- Education: Talladega College, Harvard University Law School
- Occupations: Lawyer, businessman, community civic leader, civil rights activist
- Spouse: Gladys Williams
- Awards: Thurgood Marshall Award (1993)

Willard "Mike" Blystone Ransom (1916–1995) was an American lawyer, businessman, community civic leader, and a civil rights activist in Indianapolis, Indiana. He was a leader in the National Association for the Advancement of Colored People (NAACP) in Indiana during the early years of the civil rights movement.

== Early life and education ==
Willard B. Ransom was born on May 17, 1916, and was the son of Freeman Ransom. Ransom and his family lived much of their life in Indianapolis near Indiana Avenue, in what is now called the Ransom Place Historic District. He attended Crispus Attucks High School (class of 1932) in Indianapolis.

Ransom continued his education at Talladega College (class of 1936), where he was award the summa cum laude distinction; and attended Harvard University Law School where he graduated with a J.D. degree (1939). Shortly after he passed the bar exam.

He married Gladys Williams.

== Career ==
In 1941 he worked for two months as an assistant attorney general, before he was inducted into the United States Army during World War II. Ransom trained to be a pilot at Edgewood Arsenal, and then was relocated to Tuskegee Army Airfield (now Sharpe Field) where he worked in the chemical warfare division. He also served the U.S. Army overseas. When he returned to Indianapolis after his service, Ransom became more aware of discrimination.

Ransom reorganized the Indiana state chapter of the National Association for the Advancement of Colored People (NAACP). He served as the NAACP president for five terms during the late 1940s and early 1950s. In the late 1950s, he led direct action protests, sit-ins and marches for the civil rights movement. In 1957, Mahala Ashley Dickerson, Charles Preston, and Ransom held an event in which they screened the documentary "Walk to Freedom" and led a panel discussion on the Montgomery bus boycott.

He was assistant manager of Madame C. J. Walker Manufacturing Company, a cosmetics manufacturer, from 1947 to 1954; and later served as a general manager. Ransom also had a private legal practice. In 1993, Ransom received the Thurgood Marshall Award by the American Bar Association as a recognition of his contributions to the civil rights movement.

Before his death he worked at the law firm of 'Bamberger and Feibleman'. Ransom died on November 7, 1995. The Ransom Family Papers (1912–2011) are archived at the Indiana Historical Society.
