= Freeman Ransom =

American lawyer and businessman

- Born: Freeman Briley Ransom; July 7, 1880; Grenada, Mississippi, U.S.
- Died: August 6, 1947 (aged 67); Indianapolis, Indiana, U.S.
- Burial place: West Ridge Park Cemetery
- Other names: F.B. Ransom
- Occupations: Lawyer, businessman, civic activist
- Spouse: Nettie Lillian Cox
- Children: 6, including Willard Ransom

Freeman Briley Ransom (1880–1947) was an American lawyer, businessman and civic activist in Indianapolis, Indiana. From 1911 until his death he served as legal counsel and general manager for the Madame C.J. Walker Manufacturing Company as well as Madame C.J. Walker's personal attorney. Robert Brokenburr was his law partner.

== Early life and education ==
He was born on his family's farm in Grenada, Mississippi as one of eleven children.

After graduating from Grenada's black high school, Ransom graduated from Walden University in Nashville, Tennessee in 1908 with degrees in divinity and law and as valedictorian of both classes. He completed post graduate work in the School of Law at Columbia University.

== Madame C.J. Walker Manufacturing Company ==
Soon after his move to Indianapolis in 1910, Ransom became not only Madame Walker's attorney but also the general manager for the Madame C.J. Walker Manufacturing Company. Under his leadership, the company became a national model for entrepreneurship in the United States and abroad in the African-American business community and far beyond. Ransom remained in Indianapolis to manage the company even after Walker relocated to New York.

== Other Indianapolis clients and service ==
As the Walker Company grew in scale, so did Ransom's stature in the city. He became the attorney for a number of Indianapolis businesses and civic organizations. He also held a number of civic and elected positions including:

- Indianapolis City Councilman (elected 1938)
- President of Flanner House
- State School for the Blind Trustee
- Democratic National Convention Alternate Delegate
- Bethel African Methodist Episcopal Church Trustee
- Legal consultant to the National Association for the Advancement of Colored People

== Madame Walker Theatre ==
In 1914, Madame Walker attempted to see a film at the Isis Theatre in downtown Indianapolis. Upon paying the 15 cent admission, she was informed that admission for "colored" customers had been increased to 25 cents. Walker then contacted Ransom and instructed him to sue the theatre. This is commonly believed to be the impetus for Walker to start plans on her own theatre. Walker did not live to see its construction. On land purchased for $58,000 in 1924, Ransom worked alongside A'Lelia Walker, C.J. Walker's daughter, to construct a building in honor of Madame Walker. The Walker Theatre was built to "serve as the social and cultural center of Indianapolis." The theatre opened its doors on Monday, December 26, 1927.

== Legacy ==
He is buried in West Ridge Park Cemetery in Indianapolis.

Ransom and his family lived much of their life in Indianapolis near Indiana Avenue in what is now called the Ransom Place Historic District. The district was named for him and his family in 1992, and became the first African-American neighborhood in the state of Indiana to receive such distinction. The neighborhood, which was home to many important African American business leaders, remains the most intact 19th century neighborhood associated with African Americans in Indianapolis.

On the campus of Indiana University-Purdue University Indianapolis, there is an apartment complex which bears the family name.

Ransom was prominently featured in the Netflix's 2020 mini-series Self Made, telling the story of Madam Walker, in which he was portrayed by Kevin Carroll.

The Ransom Family Papers (1912–2011) are archived at the Indiana Historical Society.

== Personal life ==
Ransom married his wife, Nettie Cox, in 1912. His children included Frank, Frederic, Willard, Robert, Cliff, and A'Lelia.
