= 1969 Indianapolis riots =

Lockefield Garden Riot

Lockefield Gardens riot
- Part of the Ghetto riots
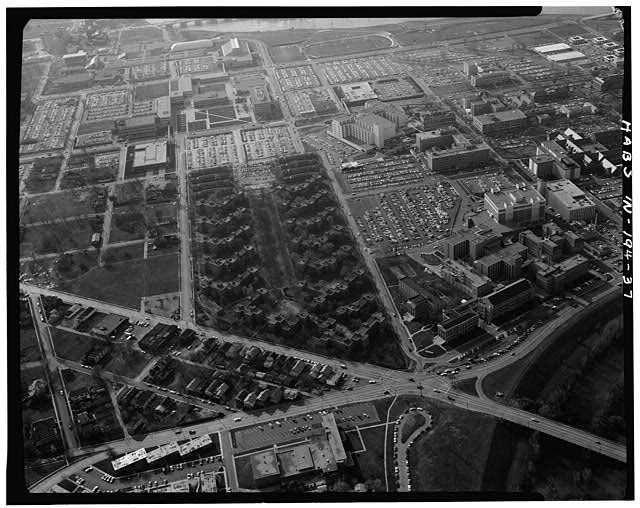
- Lockefield Gardens apartments
- Date: June 5–7, 1969
- Location: Indianapolis, Indiana, U.S.

The Lockefield Garden Riot was a riot in Indianapolis, Indiana, in 1969. Following racial tensions between Black residents and the police, the riot lasted two days, from Thursday, June 5 to Saturday June 7. The riot began when two police officers responded to a call about an alleged fight and reactions to their presence escalated. The riot resulted in the destruction of buildings and a number of arrests, but was eventually deescalated.

== Apartment significance ==
Lockefield Gardens was the first public housing complex built in Indianapolis by the Public Works Administration, constructed between 1935 and 1938. The building is located in present-day downtown Indianapolis, near the notable Indiana Avenue historic district. The complex was predominately Black and a significant cultural place for Black people in Indianapolis.

== Black and police relations in Indianapolis ==
In the 1960s, Black people in Indianapolis and the Indianapolis Police Department (IPD) had an increasingly strained relationship as the police often surveilled and intimidated Black communities, especially those who they thought to have a significant participation in the Black Power movement. The police worked to stifle any types of “black militancy” or any actions that seemed to go against white authority. They especially put a focus on predominantly Black Muslim communities through hyper-surveillance and deeming them extremist. With growing tensions, leaders from the Black community approached the mayor to ask for an independent task force to review the actions in the police department. The mayor at the time, John J. Barton, did not respond favorably to these requests and chose not to go forward. With a similar reaction from the next mayor, Richard Lugar, there became more of divide between the Black community and government authorities.

This divide was further exaggerated by the arrival of the local chapter of the Black Panther Party, a pro-Black community organization. Their connection to Black power organizing led to the increase in police surveillance. In March 1969, two Black Panthers in the local chapter were convicted of conspiracy to murder the Indianapolis police chief, Winston L. Churchill. These convictions caused further tensions in the surrounding community, and the riot was "...thought by some to be in retaliation for the conviction of the two panthers".

== The riot ==
On Thursday, June 5, 1969, there was an alleged fight between two men that Indianapolis police officers were called to break up. When the police officers arrived, "a group of twenty people attacked the officers". The officers were slightly injured, and in the conflict, one of their revolvers and badges were stolen. The Indianapolis Recorder, an African American newspaper, reported that residents claimed that, in an attempt to stop the young people who stole the revolver, "one of the officers fired a volley of three shots in the direction of a group of playing children", but the police denied the allegations. When more police arrived to assist the first two officers, the crowd started throwing stones, bricks, and bottles at them and at other passing cars.

Hundreds of rioters began looting and destroying businesses and buildings around the complex. One of the more severe moments during the riot was a fire that was started in the Lockefield Big 10 Market that was located two blocks from the complex. The rioters threw gasoline on the roof, which caused a large fire to start. The building was burning for around an hour before the crowd was persuaded by community organizers and activists to let the firefighters pass to extinguish the fire. However, by the time the firefighters gained access to the building, it was almost completely destroyed.

There are also reports of local businesses around the area being broken into, torn apart, and looted over the two nights. These businesses included a laundry mat, a record store, a mens store, and many more. Most of these businesses were near the complex and the Indiana Ave district.

On the second night, IMPD arrived with a larger number of police officers who worked long shifts to try to stifle the riot. The police and the rioters had a large standoff, where the police made many arrests. Almost at the same time of the mass arrests, civilian snipers started to shoot from the rooftop of the Lockefield Garden Building. They grazed a detective, Al Watkin, and shot Andrew Martin, a Black resident, in the leg. A helicopter shined its light on the rooftop and returned fire; the snipers eventually withdrew.

A significant amount of praise was given to youth who were part of the neighborhood center, Our Place, as they helped to patrol the streets Friday night and Saturday. They urged cooperation with police and for people to go back to their homes. After chasing away looters, the Black Panther Party helped to keep down a fire before firemen arrived. Due to mass arrests and the significant influence of Black activists, organizers, and leaders in peace keeping, the riots came to an end around 5 a.m. on that Saturday. Elizabeth Hinton states that "By the time the riot was over, two police officers in addition to Watkins was injured." However, the number of those injured by the police are unknown.

== Aftermath ==
More than 80 people were arrested and taken to jail. Because a significant portion of the rioters were youth, those in the area were given a chance to "air their grievances". This meeting was arranged by Flanner House, a community organization on the northwest side of Indianapolis. In the meeting, they focused on the treatment of Black residents by the police. The community requested recurring meetings with the police and the community to discuss the tension in the relationship. One of the proposed solutions was that a significant portion of the police patrols were removed and only the presence of AA officers be allowed. There were a few instances of firebombing and vandalism in various parts of Indianapolis in the days following, but nothing to the extent of a riot. This riot promoted other riots in Indiana such as one in Kokomo, where there were also racial troubles.

While this riot did illuminate the racial tensions in the city and the tension between police and Black people, it also was the start of the deterioration of the area. Some of the businesses affected, including the Big 10 Market, stated that they would not reopen.

== See also ==
- Lockefield Gardens
