= Flanner House Homes =

Historic district in Indianapolis, Indiana, US

- U.S. National Register of Historic Places
- U.S. Historic district
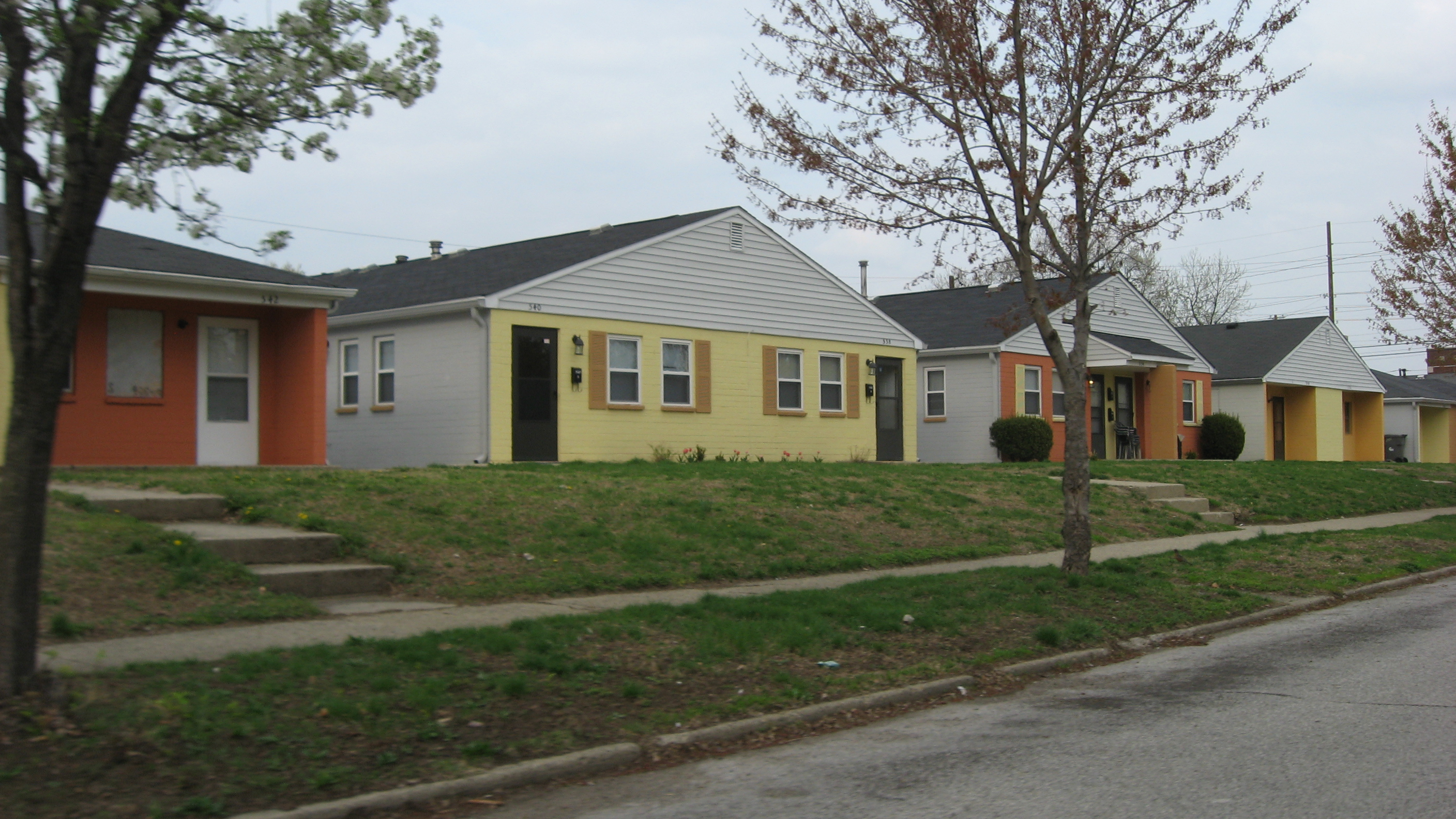
- 500 block of Drake in Indianapolis, April 2011

- Location within Indianapolis Location within Indiana Location within the United States
- Location: Roughly bounded by Dr. M.L. King Jr. Dr., 12th St., Fall Creek Parkway East Dr., and Lynn St., Indianapolis, Indiana
- Coordinates: 39°47′04″N 86°10′16″W
- Area: 34 acres (14 ha)
- Architect: Cohin, Leslie; Meranda, Alden, et al
- NRHP reference No.: 03000978
- Added to NRHP: September 28, 2003

Flanner House Homes is a national historic district located at Indianapolis, Indiana. The district encompasses 180 contributing buildings in the Project Area "A" (Indianapolis Redevelopment Commission) of Indianapolis. It was developed between about 1950 and 1959, and includes single family and duplex dwellings for African-American families. Notable buildings include the Revival Temple Church (c. 1910).

It was listed on the National Register of Historic Places in 2003.

== See also ==
- Lionel Artis
- List of African-American neighborhoods
- List of neighborhoods in Indianapolis
- National Register of Historic Places listings in Center Township, Marion County, Indiana
