= Emmett I. Brown Jr. =

American photographer

- Born: 1918
- Died: September 9, 1959 (aged 40–41); Indianapolis
- Education: Tennessee A&I (Tennessee State University)

Emmett I. Brown Jr. (1918 – September 9, 1959) was a professional photographer who is most noted for documenting Indianapolis, Indiana's jazz music scene along Indiana Avenue, a hub of activity for the city's African-American community in the 1940s and 1950s. Brown opened his own photography studio, the Brown Show Case, on Indiana Avenue in the late 1940s. During a brief residence in Chattanooga, Tennessee, in the mid-1950s, Brown opened a photography studio and became an editor at Sepia magazine. Brown returned to Indianapolis in 1956 and established a new studio on the city's eastside, where he concentrated on portraits and did freelance photography, including work for the Indianapolis Recorder. During his twenty-year career, cut short due to a heart ailment, Brown photographed Dizzy Gillespie, jazz trombonist Jimmy Cleveland, the Hampton Sisters, the Milt Buckner Trio, and The Mills Brothers, among others. He also photographed local churches, businesses, and street scenes, as well as notable individuals in Indianapolis's African-American community and nationally known boxers Joe Louis and Sugar Ray Robinson.

Brown, who grew up in Indianapolis and attended Crispus Attucks High School, also studied at Tennessee A and I (now known as Tennessee State University) in Nashville, Tennessee, and a photography school in Chicago, Illinois, before returning to his hometown to begin his career as a photographer. Brown was a member of Kappa Alpha Psi fraternity, a thirty-second degree Prince Hall Mason, and also served as an assistant pastor at Indianapolis's Martindale Avenue Church of Christ. Many of his photographs from the 1940s and 1950s are included the collection of the Indiana Historical Society.

== Early life and education ==
Emmett Isom Brown Jr., the son of Alberta S. and Emmett I. Brown Sr., was born in 1918. Emmett Sr. was an Indianapolis, Indiana, dentist who later became senior pastor at the city's Martindale Avenue Church of Christ. Emmett Jr.'s siblings included two brothers, Paul L. and John C., both of whom became dentists, and three sisters, Doris M., Lauranne, and Lillian. Doris and Lillian became teachers in the Indianapolis public school system; Lauranne became a nurse. Brown's parents also had a foster daughter named Betty.

Brown attended local public schools in Indianapolis, including Crispus Attucks High School. He also attended Tennessee A and I State University (now known as Tennessee State University) in Nashville, Tennessee. During college, Brown became a member of the Kappa Alpha Psi fraternity and served as chaplain for the fraternity's local chapter. Brown also received training at the American School of Photography in Chicago, Illinois.

In addition to photography, Brown later became a thirty-second degree Prince Hall Mason. He also sang tenor in a trio at his church.

Brown married Alta Jean King of Chattanooga, Tennessee, in 1947. They had four children, two sons and two daughters: Edmund G., Jean M., Laurence W., and Tammy J.

== Career ==
After college, Brown returned to Indianapolis in the late 1940s and established the Brown Show Case, his own photography studio at 808 Indiana Avenue, next to George's Bar, a popular venue for local musicians. The studio's strategic location enabled Brown to photograph many entertainers and jazz musicians who performed along Indiana Avenue, the hub of the city's black entertainment and music scene.

In mid-1950s Brown and his family relocated to Chattanooga, Tennessee, where he opened a photography studio and became an editor at Sepia magazine, a photo-journal publication that featured articles on African-American politics, music, and lifestyles. Brown stayed at the magazine only briefly and returned to his hometown of Indianapolis in 1956.

After his return to Indianapolis, Brown established a home at 3518 Schofield Avenue and a photography studio on the city's eastside at 1665 Martindale Avenue (the present-day Doctor Andrew J. Brown Street), where he concentrated on portraits and did freelance photography. Brown was a photographer for the Indianapolis Recorder, the city's African-American newspaper.

In addition to his photography work, Brown became an assistant pastor at Martindale Avenue Church of Christ, where his father served as senior pastor.

== Photographic works ==
Brown continued to work as a professional photographer for more than twenty years, mostly in Indianapolis, Indiana, and briefly in Chattanooga, Tennessee.

His most notable photographs document the popular jazz music scene in the 1940s and 1950s along Indianapolis's Indiana Avenue. Musical artists who appear in Brown's photographs include Dizzy Gillespie; jazz trombonist Jimmy Cleveland, who played with Lionel Hampton and recorded with Gillespie; the Hampton Sisters; the Willis Dyer Band, with Dyer playing a Hammond organ; drummer Les Fisher, who later played with Count Basie; Buddy Parker and his tenor saxophone; the Milt Buckner Trio, with Buckner on the piano and Hammond organ; and The Mills Brothers, among others.

Brown also photographed notable individuals in Indianapolis's African-American community, including Judge Mercer Moore; Francis D. Hummons, a well-known local physician; and evangelist T. R. Murff, as well as nationally known boxers Joe Louis and Sugar Ray Robinson. Brown's photos also document the activities of Indianapolis churches and church groups, local businesses, street scenes, and his family members during the 1940s and 1950s.

== Death and legacy ==
Brown suffered from a rheumatic heart condition and died on September 9, 1959, in Indianapolis, a year after undergoing open heart surgery. Funeral services were held at the Martindale Avenue Church of Christ, where he had served as assistant pastor. Brown was buried at Floral Park Cemetery in Indianapolis.

Many of Brown's photographs from the 1940s and 1950s are included the collections of the Indiana Historical Society.
