= Louise Terry Batties =

American clubwoman (1911–2014)

- Louise Terry Batties, from a 1937 newspaper
- Born: Louise Terry; September 13, 1911; Kosciusko, Mississippi, U.S.
- Died: October 4, 2014 (aged 103)
- Occupations: Clubwoman; churchworker; community leader
- Years active: 1930s–2000s
- Known for: Decades of charity and volunteer work in Indianapolis

Louise Terry Batties (September 13, 1911 – October 4, 2014) was an American clubwoman based in Indianapolis, Indiana.

== Early life and education ==
Louise Terry was born in Kosciusko, Mississippi, the daughter of Curtis Franklin Terry and Mary Ellen Terry. The Terry family moved to Indianapolis when the three daughters, including Louise, were young, part of the Great Migration. Curtis Terry had a jewelry and watch store in Indianapolis. As a young woman, Louise was a friend of pianist Nerissa Brokenburr Stickney; they were both active in the Ethical Culture Society in Indianapolis as teenagers.

Terry earned a bachelor's degree from Indiana University and a master's from Butler University in 1931. She pursued further studies in theology at the University of Chicago Divinity School and in law at the Indiana University School of Law. She was a member of Alpha Kappa Alpha.

== Career ==
Terry was executive director of the Phyllis Wheatley YWCA in Indianapolis through the 1940s and represented the city at national YWCA meetings. She helped run the city's Christmas Cheer fund and Easter parade, as founder and head of the Recorder Women Sponsors (later the Indianapolis Recorder Women's Auxiliary), a churchwomen's charity fundraising group associated with the Indianapolis Recorder newspaper. She also raised scholarship funds for Crispus Attucks High School students. Terry served on the Mayor's Commission on Human Rights in the 1950s and was active in the League of Women Voters, the National Council of Negro Women, Church Women United, and other civil organizations. She was an English teacher at Arlington High School for twelve years.

In the 1970s, Terry and her family donated the large clock that stood in front of her late father's watch shop to the city of Indianapolis, where it now stands on the East plaza of the Indianapolis City Market. In 1981, a large testimonial dinner was held in honor of Terry, with a program of speakers and entertainers, including broadcaster Bea Moten-Foster. She was honored again in 2000, for her work teaching Bible study for fourteen years in her seventies and eighties.

== Personal life ==
Terry married a physician, Paul Andrew Batties, in 1937; Nerissa Brokenburr was one of her bridesmaids. Their son, Paul Terry Batties, also became a doctor. Her husband died in 1977, and she in 2014, aged 103 years. The Indiana Historical Society library holds a small collection of her papers.
