= Madam C. J. Walker Manufacturing Company =

Cosmetics manufacturer

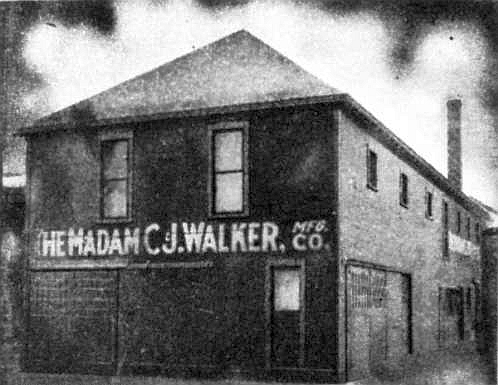
- Madam C. J. Walker Manufacturing Company, Indianapolis, Indiana, 1911.
- Type: Private
- Industry: Hair products
- Founded: 1910
- Founder: Madam C. J. Walker
- Defunct: 1981
- Headquarters: Indianapolis, Indiana, United States
- Products: Cosmetics

The Madam C. J. Walker Manufacturing Company (Madam C. J. Walker Manufacturing Co., The Walker Company) was an American cosmetics manufacturer incorporated in Indianapolis, Indiana in 1910 by Madam C. J. Walker. It was best known for its African-American cosmetics and hair care products. It is considered the most widely known and financially successful African-American-owned business of the early twentieth century. The Walker Company ceased operations in July 1981.

== History ==
=== Early life ===
Madam C. J. Walker, born Sarah Breedlove, was born on December 23, 1867, in Delta, Louisiana. Born to formerly enslaved parents, Breedlove was an orphan by the time she was seven years old. In 1881, Breedlove married Moses McWilliams at the age of 14. The couple welcomed a baby girl in 1885, named Lelia. Two years after the birth of Lelia, Moses McWilliams died.

=== 1905–1910 ===
Breedlove first formed the idea of a company in Denver, Colorado, in the early twentieth century. Like many women of her era, Breedlove suffered from scalp infections and hair loss because of hygiene practices, diet, and products that damaged her hair. Breedlove initially learned about hair and scalp care from her brothers, who owned a barber shop in St. Louis during the 1880s and 1890s. Around 1904, Breedlove became a sales agent for Annie Turnbo Malone, an African-American businesswoman who founded a company in 1900 manufacturing a "Wonderful Hair Grower." Before 1900, several other black women called themselves "hair growers" and advertised in black newspapers, including the Baltimore Afro-American and the St. Louis Palladium. In 1900 Gilbert Harris spoke about "Work in Hair" at the National Negro Business League convention in Boston.

After moving to St. Louis, Missouri, in 1889, Breedlove worked as a cook and laundress. Edmund L. Scholtz, a wholesale druggist in Denver, assisted her in developing an ointment to heal scalp disease.

In January 1906, Breedlove married Charles Joseph Walker and changed her name to "Madam C. J. Walker". Together, they marketed and sold "Walker's Wonderful Hair Grower" in Denver and surrounding Colorado communities. The first advertisements for Walker's haircare products appeared in 1906 in The Statesman and featured a front and back image of her shoulder-length hair, which boasted the growth from only two years' treatment.

In July 1906, Walker and her new husband left Denver to begin traveling throughout Texas, Oklahoma, and several southern states to market their product line. In September 1906, her daughter Lelia took over the business operations in Denver. By May 1907, tensions between Malone and Walker came to a head, and The Statesman reported that Walker would discontinue business in Denver altogether and planned to travel throughout the southern United States and eventually to northern states.

As she gained popularity, it became clear that Walker would need a temporary headquarters for her business--Pittsburgh, Pennsylvania was chosen for its convenient and accessible shipping arrangements. Amid Pittsburgh's 1908 economic crisis, Walker opened a hair parlor at 2518 Wylie Avenue among several other black businesses. Walker also began training her own sales agents and founded Lelia College, a school named after her daughter. Walker placed Lelia in charge of these agents while traveling west to Ohio. At twenty-three, Lelia was sent to Bluefield, West Virginia, to survey untapped markets.

=== 1910–1981 ===
In January 1910, Walker and her husband traveled to Louisville, Kentucky where she offered stock to Reverend Charles H. Parrish and Alice Kelly. The pair suggested that Walker write to Booker T. Washington requesting investment. She wrote to Washington, requesting his aid in raising $50,000 to form a stock company. Washington replied, "I hope very much you may be successful in organizing the stock company and that you may be successful in placing upon the market your preparation," but did not offer funding.

Walker and her husband arrived in Indianapolis, Indiana, on February 10, 1910. Seeking residence with Dr. Joseph Ward on Indiana Avenue, Indianapolis's African-American thoroughfare, Walker opened a salon in his home where she hosted sales agents and clients. Between February and April 1910, Walker grew her customer base. Multi-level marketing was Walker's most successful strategy.

By August 1910, Walker had 950 sales agents and thousands of clients coming through the salon. With her client base growing, Walker sought out two Indianapolis lawyers, Freeman Ransom and Robert Brokenburr.

In the summer of 1910, Walker asked Brokenburr to draft articles of incorporation for the Madam C. J. Walker Manufacturing Company of Indiana. The company's mission was to "sell a hairgrowing, beautifying, and scalp disease-curing preparation and clean scalps the same." Walker, her husband, and daughter were named the sole members of the board of directors.

In November 1910, with funds from her mail-order business and Ward residence salon, Walker purchased a brick home at 640 North West Street. By December, Walker had added two more rooms and a bath with plans for the addition of a factory, laboratory, and salon. According to Brokenburr's incorporation papers, the North West Street building was to be named the Madam C. J. Walker Manufacturing Company of Indiana. In 1911, Madam C. J. Walker was listed as the sole stakeholder of the company.

Marjorie Joyner (1896–1994) became an agent for Walker. By 1919, Joyner became the national supervisor of Walker's 200 beauty schools. A major role was sending their hair stylists door-to-door, dressed in black skirts and white blouses with black satchels containing a range of beauty products applied in the customer's house. Joyner taught some 15,000 stylists over her fifty-year career. She was also a leader in developing new products, such as her permanent wave machine. She helped write the first cosmetology laws for Illinois and founded a sorority and a national association for black beauticians. In 1987, the Smithsonian Institution in Washington opened an exhibit featuring Joyner's permanent wave machine and a replica of her original salon.

After Walker died in 1919, her daughter A'Lelia became president of the company. During her tenure the company built a new headquarters and manufacturing plant in 1927 in Indianapolis. However, the Great Depression hurt sales and forced her to sell personal art and antiques to keep the company operating. When A'Lelia died in 1931, her adopted daughter Mae Walker succeeded her until she died in 1945. Mae's daughter, A'Lelia Mae Perry Bundles, became the fourth company president. The company closed in 1981, but the 1927 building later became the Madam Walker Legacy Center.

=== 2016–present ===
In March 2020, Sundial Brands revived the brand name as Madam C. J. Walker Beauty Culture that is sold by Sephora. Two years later, Sundial announced that the brand, MADAM, would be stocked in 3,000 Walmart stores.

== See also ==
- Avon
- Mary Kay
