= Wilma Gibbs Moore =

American librarian and archivist (1951–2018)

- Born: March 1951; Indianapolis, Indiana
- Died: April 18, 2018 (aged 67); Indianapolis, Indiana
- Education: Indiana University Bloomington
- Occupation: Archivist
- Known for: Preserving African American history in Indiana

Wilma Gibbs Moore (March 21, 1951 – April 18, 2018) was a librarian and archivist from Indianapolis, Indiana. She is known for her role as an archivist at the Indiana Historical Society where she spent 30 years dedicated to preserving and interpreting African American history in Indiana by developing the African American History Program and collections. From 1986 to 2007, Moore served as editor to Black History News and Notes which was a free quarterly publication produced by the Indiana Historical Society that shared history and news about African Americans in Indiana.

== Early life and education ==
Wilma Gibbs was born in Indianapolis, Indiana March 21,1951 to Tessie Arlene and William Joseph Gibbs. In 1969, she graduated from Crispus Attucks High School. Gibbs attended Indiana University Bloomington and received a bachelor's degree in sociology in 1973 and a Master of Library and Information Science in 1974.

== Career ==
Moore worked for Indiana University Libraries and the Indianapolis Public Library. She spent 30 years at the Indiana Historical Society Library as Senior Archivist in the African American History Program, retiring in 2017. She served as the editor of Indiana Historical Society's Black History News and Notes publication from 1986 to 2007. Then from 2007 to 2017, Moore served as a contributing editor to Traces of Indiana and Midwestern History a quarterly history magazine published by the Indiana Historical Society in which Black History News and Notes was merged with. She authored the 1993 book Indiana's African-American Heritage.

Moore taught at Butler University and Indianapolis University-Purdue University Indianapolis.

Moore contributed her knowledge and expertise to a number of organizations promoting African American history and culture, including the Association for the Study of African American Life and History and the Indiana African American Genealogy Group. She was a key contributor to documentation of the Underground Railroad in Indiana through her work on Indiana Freedom Trails, and the Indiana Landmarks' African American Landmarks Committee. In recognition of her work, the American Association for State and Local History gave her an Award of Merit, and the Indiana Historical Society honored her with the Eli Lilly Lifetime Achievement Award.

Moore died on April 18, 2018. In 2020, the nonprofit Indiana Humanities established the Wilma Gibbs Moore Fellowships to support humanities research into structural racism and anti-black racial injustice in Indiana.

== Awards ==
- 2016 American Association for State and Local History Leadership in History Award "for a lifetime of dedication to preserving and interpreting Indiana's African American heritage."
- 2017 Eli Lilly Lifetime Achievement Award "for her extraordinary contributions over an extended period of time to the field of history."
