= Nerissa Brokenburr Stickney =

American pianist (1913–1960)

- Nerissa Brokenburr, from a 1935 newspaper
- Born: Nerissa Lee Brokenburr; March 22, 1913; Indianapolis, Indiana, U.S.
- Died: July 31, 1960 (aged 47); Houston, Texas, U.S.
- Other names: Nerissa Lee Stickney
- Occupations: Pianist, music educator
- Parent: Robert Brokenburr

Nerissa Brokenburr Stickney (March 22, 1913 – July 31, 1960), born Nerissa Lee Brokenburr, was an American pianist and music educator at Florida A&M University from 1935 to 1940.

== Early life and education ==
Nerissa Brokenburr was born in Indianapolis, the elder daughter of attorney Robert Brokenburr and his first wife, Alice Jean Glover Brokenburr. Her father served in the Indiana Senate, and was a civil rights activist. She graduated from Crispus Attucks High School in Indianapolis in 1929. As a teen in 1927, she was a soloist at the annual meeting of the Indiana Convention of Negro Musicians.

Her sister Alice was also a musician; both sisters studied piano and organ at the Oberlin Conservatory of Music. and were members of Delta Sigma Theta. She earned a B.A. degree in 1933 and a Mus.B. degree in 1935. While at college, she was secretary of Oberlin's Scottsboro Action Committee, an anti-lynching group, and co-signed a report on racial discrimination at Oberlin.

She was friend of Indianapolis clubwoman Louise Terry Batties from their teens, and was a bridesmaid at the Terry-Batties wedding in 1937. Both women were active in the Inter-Collegiate Club in Indianapolis.

== Career ==
Immediately after Oberlin, Brokenburr gave a "sound, intelligent, and musical" recital in Indianapolis, and taught music at Florida A&M University (then known as Tallahassee State College) in Florida from 1935 to 1940. She performed often on piano and organ for the school's evening vespers program. In 1939 she attended the annual convention of the Association of Music Teachers at Negro Schools, held at Fisk University. In 1940 she married a fellow instructor at the college.

== Personal life ==
Nerissa Brokenburr married fellow educator William Homer Stickney Jr. (1902–1982) in 1940. They lived in Prairie View, Texas, and had three children together, Janice, William, and Roberta. She died after a heart attack in 1960, aged 47 years, at a hospital in Houston, Texas.
