= Charles A. Walton (Indiana politician) =

Indiana lawyer and state legislator

Charles Atlas Walton (June 24, 1936 - February 19, 1996) was a lawyer and state legislator in Indiana.

== Biography ==
Walton was born June 24, 1936, in Lamkin, Mississippi, into a family of share-croppers who migrated in 1941 to Indiana. He was educated in Indianapolis and graduated from Crispus Attucks High School in 1952. He was awarded a scholarship at the age of 15 to allow him to attend Morehouse College in Atlanta, Georgia from where he obtained his Bachelor of Arts in 1956. He then went on to earn a Juris Doctor in May 1959 from Indiana University's law school at just the age of 22. In 1965 he was inducted into the Crispus Attucks Hall of Fame.

He married his college classmate Joan Blackshear Walton and they were together for forty years.

=== Law career ===
He was admitted to the bar in Indiana and started to work as a deputy prosecuting attorney and later he started up in private practice in the law firm Mance, Kuykendall and Chavis. He was a president of the Marion County Bar Association in 1975, a member of the NAACP and was chairman of several committees in the National Bar Association. During his legal career he worked with several firms including Walton and Pratt that he started with his daughter, son and son-in-law in 1992.

=== Politician ===
The racial issues of the early 1960s in Indianapolis prompted him to become involved in politics and he joined the Marion County Democratic Party where he was an active member. Walton was elected to the Indiana House of Representatives representing Marion County in 1964. During his service he sponsored a number of bills focussing on the issues of criminal justice reform, public education, housing and school lunch programs.

In 1987 he ran for mayor in Indianapolis.

== Death ==
Walton died February 19, 1996, in Indianapolis and was survived by his wife and four children

== See also ==
- Daisy Lloyd
