= Madam Walker Legacy Center =

National Historic Landmark in Indianapolis, Indiana, US

- Madam C. J. Walker Manufacturing Company
- U.S. National Register of Historic Places
- U.S. National Historic Landmark
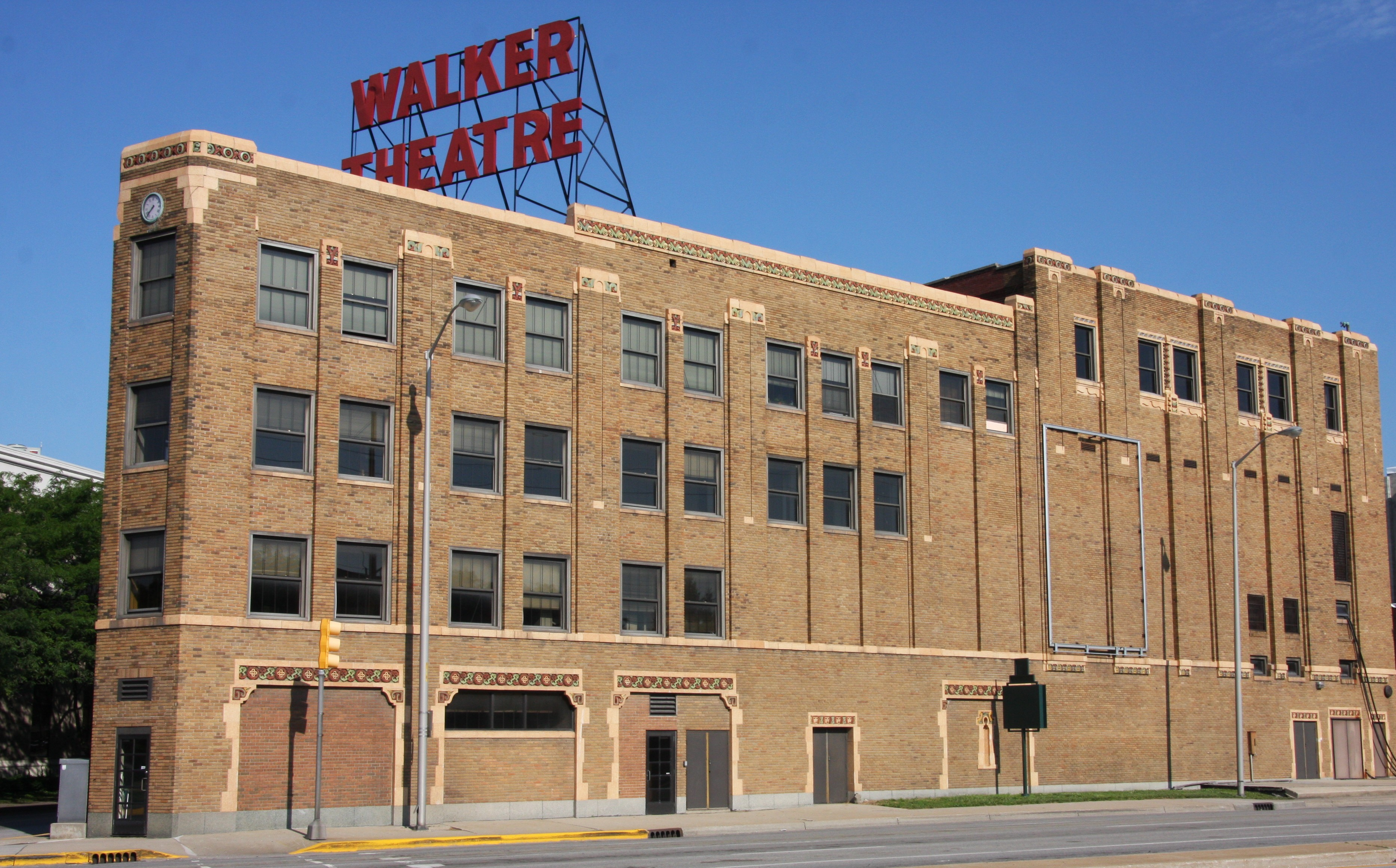
- The Madam C. J. Walker Building in 2016

- Location within Indianapolis Location within Indiana Location within the United States
- Location: Indianapolis, Indiana, U.S.
- Coordinates: 39°46′33.5″N 86°10′1.5″W
- Built: 1927
- Architect: Rubush & Hunter
- Architectural style: African-Art Deco
- NRHP reference No.: 80000062

Significant dates
- Added to NRHP: July 17, 1980
- Designated NHL: July 17, 1991

The Madam C. J. Walker Building, which houses the Madam Walker Legacy Center, was built in 1927 in the city of Indianapolis, Indiana, and as Madam C. J. Walker Manufacturing Company, it was designated a National Historic Landmark in 1991. The four-story, multi-purpose Walker Building was named in honor of Madam C. J. Walker, the African American hair care and beauty products entrepreneur who founded the Madam C. J. Walker Manufacturing Company, and designed by the Indianapolis architectural firm of Rubush & Hunter. The building served as the world headquarters for Walker's company, as well as entertainment, business, and commercial hub along Indiana Avenue for the city's African American community from the 1920s to the 1950s. The historic gathering place and venue for community events and arts and cultural programs were saved from demolition in the 1970s. The restored building, which includes African, Egyptian, and Moorish designs, is one of the few remaining African-Art Deco buildings in the United States. The Walker Building was added to the National Register of Historic Places in 1980.

== History ==
Madam C.J. (Sarah Breedlove) Walker (1867–1919), an African-American hair care and beauty products entrepreneur around the turn of the century, began development of the Walker Building and its theatre prior to her death in 1919; however, her daughter, A'Lelia Walker, in collaboration with Freeman B. Ransom, the Madam C. J. Walker Manufacturing Company's attorney, supervised the completion of the project. The building was named in Madam Walker's honor and opened to the public on December 26, 1927, eight years after her death. The four-story, triangular-shaped building at 617 Indiana Avenue was designed by the Indianapolis architectural firm of Rubush & Hunter and built by W. Jungclaus Company.

The Walker Building is located along Indiana Avenue, a center "of entertainment, business and pride" for the city's African American community from the 1920s to the 1950s. The building served as the world headquarters for the Madam C. J. Walker Manufacturing Company, "one of the earliest, and for years the most successful, black business empires in the United States." In 1910, Madam Walker established the headquarters for her hair care and beauty business in Indianapolis, Indiana, where her company at one time employed about 3,000 women workers at its on-site factory. The company's new multi-purpose building opened in 1927. In addition to housing the company's headquarters and manufacturing facilities, the Walker building included a Walker beauty school/salon, a fourth-floor ballroom called the Grand Casino, an auditorium/movie theater, a drugstore, the Coffee Pot restaurant/coffee shop, and various professional offices.

The Walker Theater Company, a separate entity from the Walker Manufacturing Company, leased the theater space from the manufacturing company and operated it as a stage/movie theater until the mid-1930s when the theater suffered from financial difficulties and outside managers took over its operation. The building's performance spaces were among the many jazz venues lining Indiana Avenue, but the Walker building is only one still standing. Numerous musicians have performed at the Walker theater, including several Indianapolis natives and jazz musicians such as Wes Montgomery, Freddie Hubbard, and J. J. Johnson, among others. The theater also hosted vaudeville acts and film screenings. During the mid-1950s "the building and its surrounding neighborhood began a gradual decline" as African-American middle-class families began moving to other areas of the city. The theater briefly closed in the 1960s.

=== Preservation and restoration ===
"By the late 1970s the Walker Building stood nearly abandoned" and faced demolition, with only Walker Manufacturing Company remaining housed in the building. A "group of Indianapolis citizens recognized the structure's rich history" and began a project to preserve the aging building. Although the exact date is not known, it is believed that the theater remained closed from 1978 or 1979 until its restoration was completed and it reopened in 1988.

The Madam Walker Building Urban Life Center, an incorporated not-for-profit organization that formed in 1979, "purchased the building from the Walker Manufacturing Company and began planning for its restoration" with the intention of reestablishing the facility as a cultural center and encouraging economic enterprise. The site was listed on the Indiana Register of Historic Sites and Structures and added to the National Register of Historic Places in 1980. In 1982 the organization's articles of incorporation were amended to reflect its new name, the Madam Walker Urban Life Center.

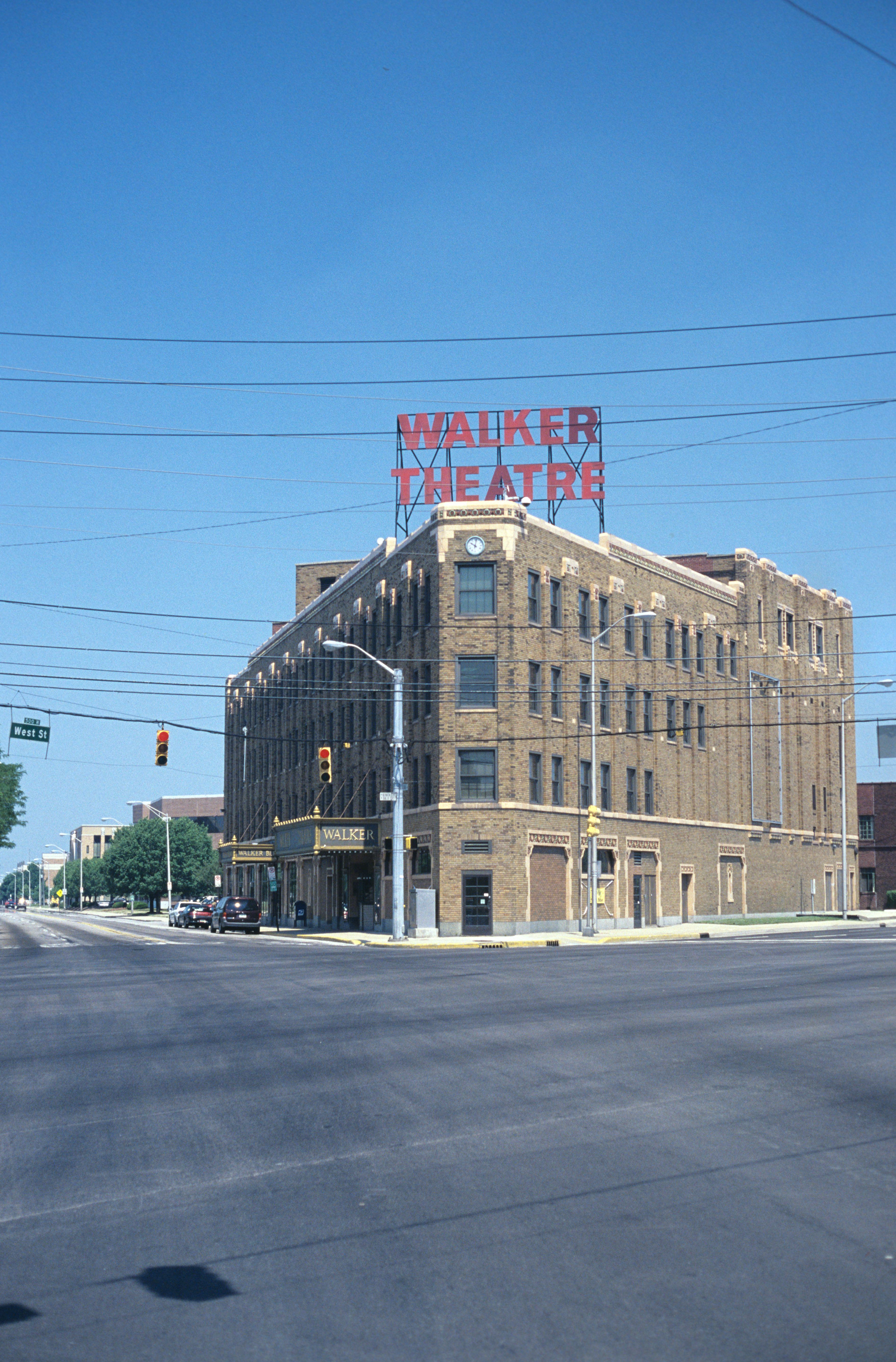

The first phase of the restoration, which housed offices and the Grand Casino Ballroom, was completed in 1983. A $2.5 million capital campaign raised funds to restore the Walker Theatre with a present-day seating capacity of 935. The influence of African art forms in A'Lelia Walker's original design concept is apparent throughout the restored theatre. Financial support for the restoration came from Lilly Endowment and others donors. In October 1988, the Walker Theatre reopened in the fully restored Walker Building under the management of the Madam Walker Urban Life Center. The Urban Life Center also collaborated on two office structures along Indiana Avenue: Walker Plaza, built in 1989, and 500 Place, which was completed in 1992. The building was designated as a National Historic Landmark on July 17, 1991. In 1996 the Madam Walker Urban Life Center was renamed the Madam Walker Theatre Center to better reflect the organization's purpose.

Indiana University and Indiana University – Purdue University Indianapolis announced in early 2018 its partnership with the Madam Walker Theatre Center to preserve and restore the historic building. A grant of more than $15.3 million from the Lilly Endowment will provide the funding for the building's renovation and its transitional operations. The facility will also be renamed the Madam Walker Legacy Center.

== Programming ==
Since the Walker building opened in 1927 it has been used as a meeting place and venue for community events and arts and cultural programs. In 1987, the Madam Walker Theatre Center launched the Youth-in-Arts program, which targeted more than 150 youth who may not have the resources to experience the arts outside of their typical school setting. The theatre's educational program was redesigned in 2007. In more recent years the facility's program offerings have been more limited due to the deterioration of the building, aging equipment, and consistent leadership challenges.

=== Other uses ===
The center also provides facilities for Freetown Village and Iibada Dance Company. It serves as a rental facility for other arts, social, civic and business organizations to host their programs and activities.

The theatre is used for pageants, musicals, concerts, lecturers, auditions and rehearsals, motion picture and video screenings, ceremonial awards presentations and other community events.

== Description ==
The building's ornamentation is loosely based on African motifs, many of which were blended into a "more standard Art Deco geometric ornamentation." Some sources describe the Walker Theatre as one of the few remaining African-Art Deco buildings in the United States.

A'Lelia Walker commissioned the local architectural firm of Rubush & Hunter to design the 48,000 square foot Walker Building to honor her mother in 1927. The Wm. P. Jungclaus Company constructed the building on a triangular lot at the intersection of North Street, West Street (Dr. Martin Luther King Boulevard), and Indiana Avenue in Indianapolis at a cost of $350,000. The Walker Company financed its construction with first and second mortgages. The triangular-shaped building included a theater and ballroom in addition to the Walker Company manufacturing facilities and offices, a Walker beauty school/salon, a drugstore, a restaurant/coffee shop, and office rental spaces.

=== Exterior ===
The four-story, Art Deco-style building is constructed with reinforced concrete, yellow brick-faced walls, an asphalt roof, and a concrete foundation. The triangular-shaped building has two main facades along Indiana Avenue and West Street (Dr. Martin Luther King Blvd.). The south (Indiana Avenue) facade includes storefronts and an entrance to the Walker Theatre. The West Street facade includes a stage entrance and emergency exits. Another ground-floor entrance is located at the point of the triangular-shaped building at Indiana Avenue and West Street. Terracotta architectural details surround the ground-level openings on the two main facades. The building's decorative elements contain African, Moorish, and Egyptian motifs and geometric lines.

The south facade's upper levels are divided into twelve major bays, while the upper levels of the east facade contains nine major bays. Pilasters with terracotta caps and decorative insets define each bay. Second and third-floor levels include sash windows, but the fourth-floor sash windows have been replaced with casement windows. A parapet extends across ten bays of the south facade with smaller parapets on the east facade and central point of the building. The rear facade is constructed of concrete structural members and red brick. It is one-half story taller than the other facades to accommodate the theater's stage equipment. The theater marquee and box office also include Moorish decorative influences. A one-bay facade facing southeast, toward downtown Indianapolis, once served as the entrance to a drugstore and restaurant/coffee shop.

=== Interior ===
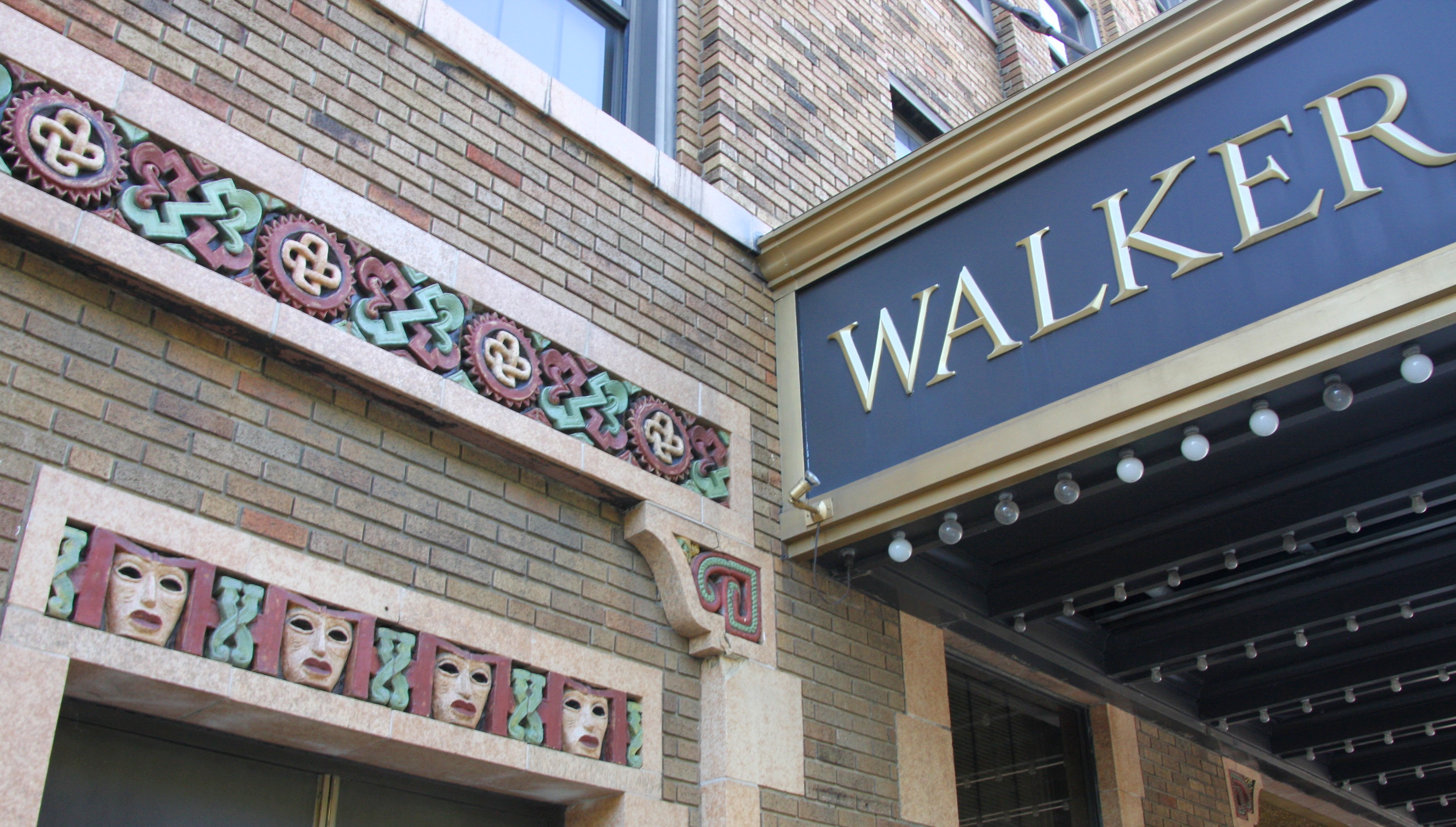
Ornamental details on the Madam Walker Theatre

The interior ornamentation includes bold colors and Egyptian and Moorish motifs with Art Deco details on the building's stucco walls and ceilings. The theatre, which is the largest section of the building, has a present-day seating capacity of 935. The theatre includes a large stage with a grand drape, pipe organ lofts, an orchestra pit, elaborate decorations, and plush seating, in addition to a small lobby. A wood and lead glass screen separate the lobby area from the theater. The pipe organ lofts also include screens of turned spindles. The stage is flanked with two Egyptian-inspired sphinxes. In addition, the stage walls and ceiling include a variety of designs such as African masks, warrior shields, spears, animals, and other exotic symbols. The theater's decoration also includes brass embellishments. Additional features of the theatre include professional lighting and sound systems, dressing rooms, lobby, box office services, a bar lounge, catering and technical services, and parking spaces.

In addition to a theater, the building has additional event venues such as the Grand Casino Ballroom, the Walker Memorial Board Room, and the A'Lelia Bundles Conference Center. The stage and the fourth-floor ballroom have been redecorated over the years.

== Legacy ==
The Walker Building was listed on the Indiana Register of Historic Sites and Structures and added to the National Register of Historic Places in 1980. As the Madam C. J. Walker Manufacturing Company, it was designated a National Historic Landmark in 1991.

The historic Walker Building, which remains an anchor site along Indiana Avenue, initially served as the headquarters and factory for the Walker Company and as a center of black female employment. It also functioned as a hub "of entertainment, business and pride" for the city's African American community from the 1920s to the 1950s. The restored building continues to serve the community as a legacy to Madam C.J. Walker's success in the beauty and cosmetology industry, as well as her interest in promoting the arts. It no longer houses the Walker Manufacturing Company, but the building continues to serve as a cultural center for the African American community.

The Walker Building is the only extant architectural building of Indiana Avenue's once vibrant nightlife. Since it opened in 1927, the building has offered performances, educational programs, and a gathering place for public and private gatherings and celebrations. As of 2012, the building was one of the city's only National Historic Landmark-owned and operated by African Americans. As a tribute to Madam C.J. Walker, the building's namesake, the facility's ongoing mission is to promote social justice, provide cultural education, and empower "the next generation of entrepreneurs, business owners, and civic leaders" and serves as a "symbol of African-American pride."

== In pop culture ==
The historic Walker Theatre is referenced in singer/songwriter Leroy Carr's "Naptown Blues" and Mari Evans's poem, "I Am A Black Woman."

== See also ==
- List of attractions and events in Indianapolis
- List of Art Deco architecture in Indiana
- List of National Historic Landmarks in Indiana
- National Register of Historic Places listings in Center Township, Marion County, Indiana

== Sources ==
- Benedict-Browne, Tiffany. "The Icon of Indiana Avenue". No Mean City.
- Clark-Perez, Kathleen (March 6, 2018). "IU to collaborate With Madame Walker Theatre Center". Indiana Daily Student. Bloomington, Indiana.
- Gibson-Hudson, Gloria J. (February 1989). "'To all classes; to all races; this house is dedicated': The Walker Theatre Revisited". Black History News and Notes. 35. Indianapolis: Indiana Historical Society: 4–6.
- IBJ Staff (January 19, 2018). "Madam Walker Theatre to get $15M renovation, operational help". Indianapolis Business Journal. Indianapolis, Indiana.
- Kendrick, Adrian (November 1, 2012). "The Madame Walker Theatre Building celebrates 85 years". The Indianapolis Recorder. Indianapolis, Indiana.
- Latham Jr., Charles (Summer 1989). "Madam C. J. Walker and Company". Traces of Indiana and Midwestern History. 1 (3). Indianapolis: Indiana Historical Society: 28–37.
- Long, Kyle (February 4, 2015). "Madame Walker's legacy". Nuvo.
- "Madam Walker Theatre Center and IU begin partnership to continue rich legacy of Madam C.J. Walker". Indiana University. January 18, 2018.
- "Madame C. J. Walker Building". Indianapolis: A Discover Our Shared Heritage Travel Itinerary. National Park Service, U.S. Department of the Interior. Archived from the original on August 27, 2007.
- "Madame C. J. Walker Manufacturing Company". National Historic Landmarks Program. National Park Service, U.S. Department of the Interior. Archived from the original on January 14, 2009.
- "Madame Walker Theatre Center". Visit Indy.
- Miller, Paige Putnam (June 4, 1990). "National Historic Landmark Nomination: Madame C.J. Walker Building". National Park Service, U.S. Department of the Interior. Also, Accompanying four photos from 1990
- "National Register Information System". National Register of Historic Places. National Park Service. March 15, 2006.
- Olson, Scott (March 2, 2018). "$15.3M Walker Theatre rehab to return shine to community gem". Indianapolis Business Journal. Indianapolis, Indiana.
- Payne, Cordilia M. (August 1999). "An African-American Historic Building: The Walker Theater". Black History News and Notes. 77. Indianapolis: Indiana Historical Society: 4–8.
- "Presenting the Madame Walker Urban Life Center". Black History News and Notes. 35. Indianapolis: Indiana Historical Society: 1–2. February 1989.
