= Robert Brokenburr =

Indiana politician (1886–1974)

Member of the Indiana Senate
- In office 1940–1960

Personal details
- Born: November 16, 1886 Phoebus, Virginia, U.S.
- Died: March 24, 1974 (aged 87)
- Resting place: Crown Hill Cemetery and Arboretum, Indianapolis, Indiana. U.S. Section 98, Lot 1134; 39.813843°N 86.1715798°W
- Party: Republican
- Children: Nerissa Brokenburr Stickney, Alice Brokenburr Ray

Robert Lee Brokenburr (November 16, 1886 – March 24, 1974) was an American attorney, civil rights leader, and state legislator in Indiana. After several election campaigns, Brokenburr ran as a Republican for an Indiana Senate seat in 1940 and became the first African-American elected to the body where he served for 20 years. Prior to running for office, Brokenburr worked as counsel and general manager for the Madame C.J. Walker Manufacturing Company while carrying on his own practice litigating civil rights cases.

== Early life and education ==
Robert Lee Brokenburr was born on November 16, 1886, in Phoebus, Virginia. His father, Benjamin Brokenburr, was emancipated from slavery as a child.

He graduated from Hampton Normal and Agricultural Institute in 1906, and received a law degree from Howard University in 1909. He was admitted to the Indiana State Bar in 1910.

== Career ==
=== Law career ===
In 1910, Brokenburr moved to Indianapolis where he shared an office with Freeman B. Ransom. While in practice, he won several early civil rights victories. In Galliard v. Grant, he challenged an Indianapolis ordinance which divided the city into zones segregated by race. The ordinance was declared unconstitutional by the Circuit Court of Marion County in 1926. In Baily vs. Washington Theatre Company, he represented a woman who was refused service at a theater based on her race. Although the court initially ruled against Ms. Baily, the decision was overturned on appeal.

Brokenburr also served as deputy prosecuting attorney for Marion County from 1919 to 1931. He retired from practice in 1971.

=== The Madame C.J. Walker Manufacturing Company ===
In addition to his private practice, he helped Madame C.J. Walker form the Madame C.J. Walker Manufacturing Company, writing the articles of incorporation and serving as general manager and counsel for the company. The company, which sold cosmetic and haircare products for black women, went on to be one of the most successful African-American owned businesses in the United States.

=== NAACP presidency ===
Brokenburr became president of the Indianapolis chapter of the NAACP in 1914.

=== Political career ===
Brokenburr unsuccessfully ran for office in the Indiana House of Representatives three times between 1912 and 1934. In 1940, he ran as a Republican candidate for the Indiana Senate and became the first African-American elected to the Indiana State Senate. He served four additional terms in 1944, 1952, 1956, and 1960. As state senator, he wrote the act establishing the Indiana Civil Rights Commission.

In 1955, President Eisenhower appointed Brokenburr as an alternate delegate to the United Nations.

== Personal life ==
Brokenburr married Alice Glover, who also attended Hampton Normal, in 1911 in Indianapolis. They had two children, Nerissa Brokenburr Stickney and Alice Brokenburr Ray; both daughters were pianists trained at Oberlin Conservatory of Music.

After Alice died in 1945, Brokenburr married his second wife, Nettie. who died in 1969.

== See also ==
- List of African-American officeholders (1900–1959)
