= Erroll Grandy =

American jazz pianist (1918–1986)

- Born: January 1, 1918 (age 107)
- Died: June 12, 1996 (aged 78)
- Burial place: Crown Hill Cemetery, Section 98, Lot 986, indianapolis, indiana 39.8136527°N 86.1716931°W

Erroll Grandy (January 1, 1918 – June 12, 1996) was an American jazz pianist.

Erroll Grandy was highly influential in the Indianapolis jazz scene. Earning him the nickname, "godfather of Indiana Avenue jazz" because his musical impact in the 1940s to the 1960s. He would later be inducted into the Indiana Jazz's "Hall of Fame".

== Early life ==
Grandy was born January 1, 1918, in near Norfolk, Virginia to parents Mary and Thomas Grandy. His childhood was spent in Cape Charles, Virginia and was introduced to music at a young age. While living in the South, Grandy was struck with a cataracts that left him virtually blind. In 1936, he moved to Indianapolis, Indiana with his family when his father, Thomas Leroy Grandy, received the opportunity as a pastor at Witherspoon Presbyterian Church. Grandy graduated from Crispus Attucks High School in 1940. Later that same year, he enrolled in the Jordan Conservatory of Music, what would eventually become the Jordan College of the Arts under Butler University, and graduated with a Bachelors of Arts in Music in 1944.

== Career ==
Grandy was considered a mentor to many jazz musicians and was a significant influence in Indianapolis' jazz scene from the 1940s through the 1960s. Grandy quickly became a familiar face in the Indianapolis club circuit, backing visiting musicians such as Dinah Washington, Billie Holiday, Lionel Hampton, and Count Basie. He earned the nickname "Ground Hog" by his entertainment contemporaries and considered the "Godfather of Indiana Avenue Jazz." Grandy's musical contributions were recognized by a mayoral proclamation of Erroll Grandy Day on May 6, 1984, highlighted by a marathon benefit concert featuring 14 leading Indianapolis jazz groups. Later that same year, Grandy would be featured in the first annual Indiana Jazz Festival, a two night festival that showcased Indiana's top jazz musicians and highlighted their contributions to the history of jazz.

== Death and legacy ==
Grandy performed regularly until he moved into the Alpha Nursing Home due to declining health in 1986. He died five years later on June 12, 1991. Grandy was inducted into Indiana's Jazz Hall of Fame in 1984 and the Indianapolis Jazz Hall of Fame in 2015.
