= Lockefield Gardens =

- Lockefield Garden Apartments
- U.S. National Register of Historic Places
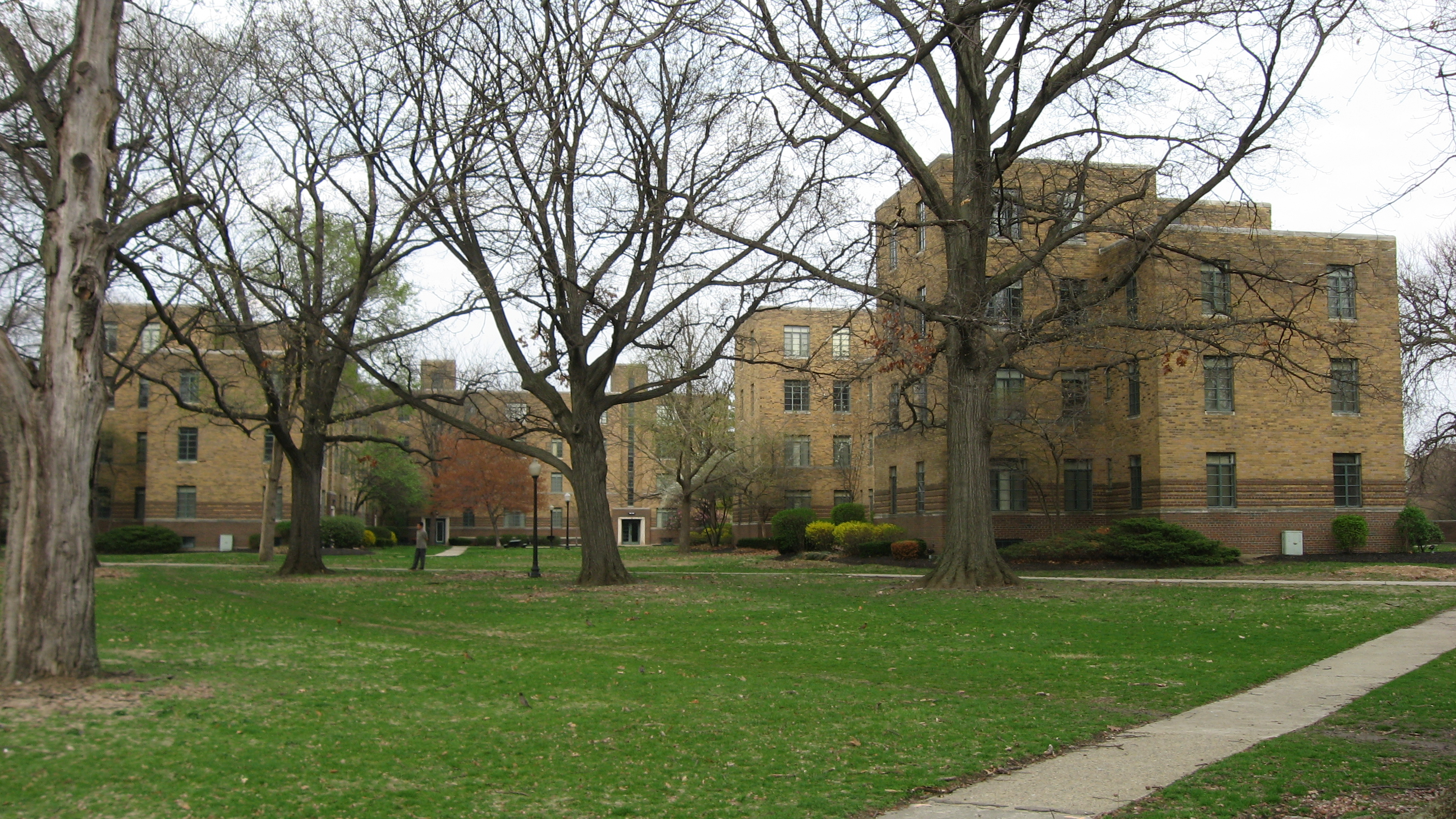
- Two of the buildings in the complex

- Location within Indianapolis Location within Indianapolis Location within Indiana Location within the United States
- Location: 900 Indiana Avenue, Indianapolis, Indiana
- Coordinates: 39°46′41.7″N 86°10′25.6″W
- Area: 9.5 acres (3.8 ha)
- Built: 1935
- Architect: Russ, William E.; Harrison, Merritt
- Architectural style: International Style
- NRHP reference No.: 83000133
- Added to NRHP: February 28, 1983

Lockefield Gardens was the first public housing built in Indianapolis. Constructed during the years 1935 to 1938, it was built exclusively for low income African-Americans in Indianapolis. The complex was closed in 1976, and a number of structures were demolished in the early 1980s. The only original structures remaining are those along Blake Street.

== History ==
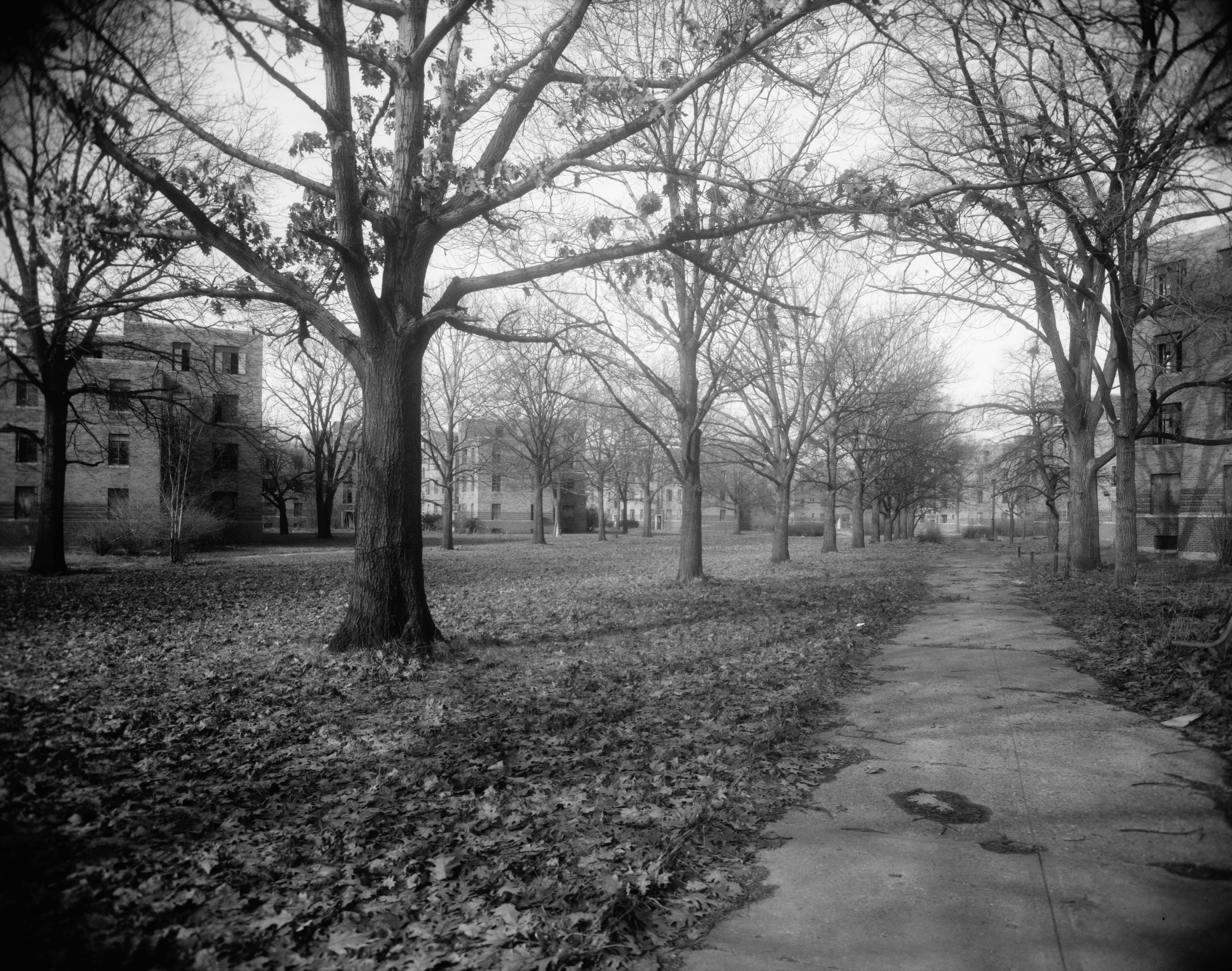
Central mall looking northwest, lined with apartments

=== Construction ===
Due to Franklin Delano Roosevelt's New Deal, the Public Works Administration funded fifty low-cost public housing projects in twenty states in what were previously slum areas. Indianapolis was chosen to have one of these renovations; it would be the first major public housing within Indiana's capital city. This land originally had 363 residences, of which only one was seen as "habitable". Another goal of the project was to provide temporary construction jobs in the area, 9,000 in total. This was done despite the wishes of Indiana congressmen, as they feared that private enterprises would be hurt by federal projects such as this.

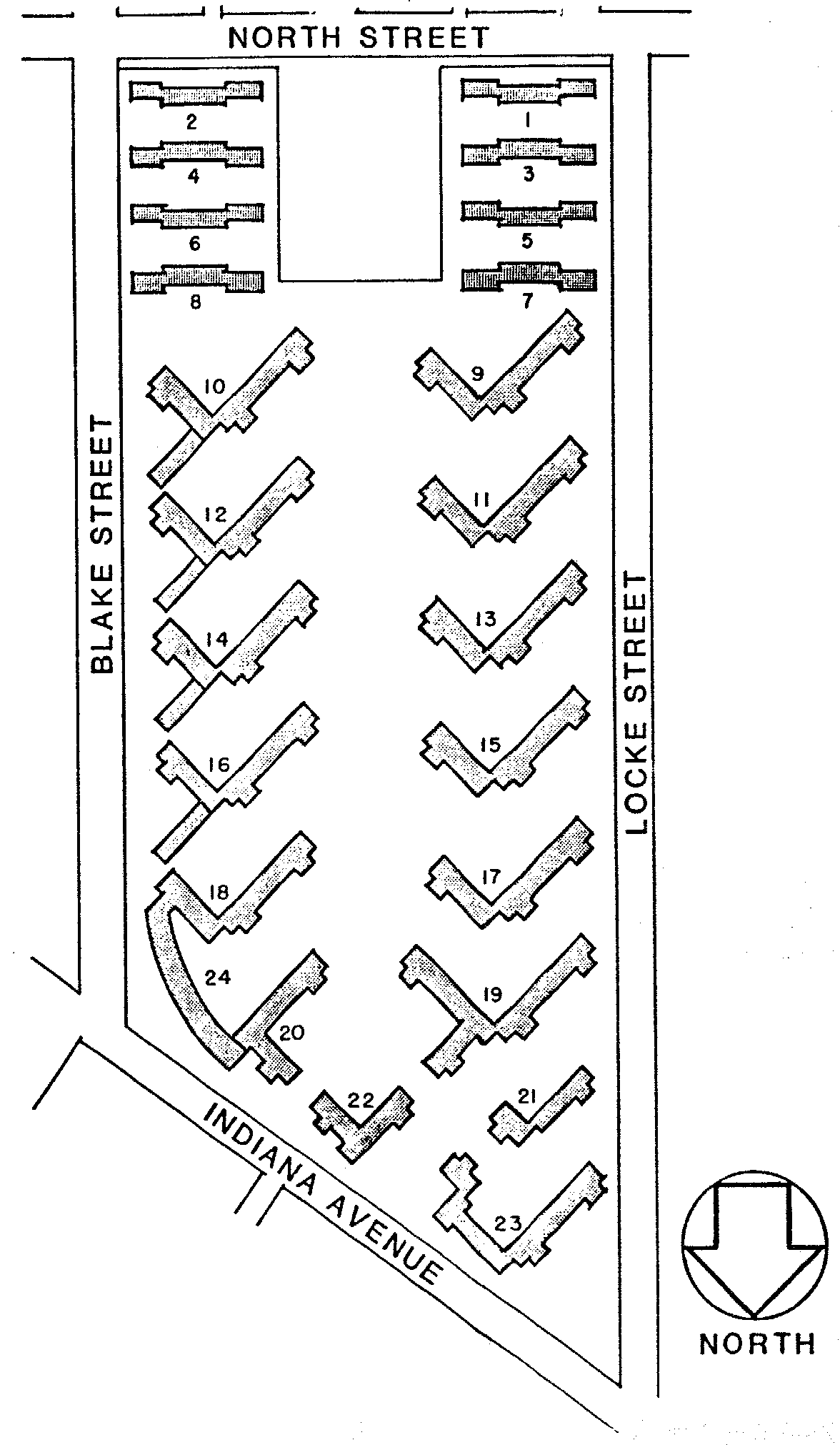
Site plan, prior to partial demolition in 1983.

Three million dollars was spent on the Lockefield Gardens project, which opened in February 1938. Twenty-two acres (8.9 ha) along Indiana Avenue were chosen as the site of the 748 separate housing units. Based on European prototypes, they were designed by the Russ and Harrison architecture firm and built by N. P. Severin Company of Chicago. The twenty-four buildings which made up the complex ranged from two to four stories. "Corner", "strip", and "tee" models used by the Public Works Administration in other projects were used here. Among the amenities of this housing were a central mall, four playgrounds (with thirteen smaller play areas), a school (William D. McCoy Public School #24), and a small shopping arcade. It featured plenty of ventilation, abundant natural sunlight, and pleasant views of the area. Rents ranged from $20.80 to $30.10 a month. Lionel Artis was chosen as the original apartment housing manager, a position he held until his retirement in 1969, a span of over thirty years. After construction, it was considered one of the best of the New Deal housing projects. The spacious, wide-open areas of Lockefield Gardens were an oddity; other New Deal housing projects were cramped.

=== Black community and Dust Bowl Tournament ===
When it originally opened, Lockefield Gardens was racially segregated, but it allowed African-Americans something they rarely had: a community-oriented residence. Lockefield Gardens became the nucleus of the black community located immediately northwest of downtown Indianapolis.

From 1948 to 1974, Lockefield Gardens was home to the annual Dust Bowl Tournament, a basketball tournament for male graduates of Indiana high schools. The tournament was named after a gravel basketball court on the south end of Lockefield Gardens. Several famous basketball players participated in these tournaments, including Harlem Globetrotter Willie Gardner and NBA Player Oscar Robertson.

=== Partial demolition ===
In the 1950s, as racial equality improved, African-Americans began moving to what were residential areas mostly inhabited by white people. Due to income restrictions and more prosperous African Americans leaving, Lockefield Gardens began to decline. A redevelopment plan in the 1970s was hoped to revitalize the district, but federal judge S. Hugh Dillin ruled that it would lead to continued segregation at the educational and residential level. As a result, the apartments were closed in 1976.

In 1980, it was decided that, in addition to an immediate need to house athletes from the Pan Am Games being hosted in Indianapolis, part of the Lockefield Gardens area would be used for the expansion of Indiana University-Purdue University Indianapolis (IUPUI), a campus of both the Indiana University and Purdue University systems. In 1983, after demolitions, only six units along Blake Street, out of the original twenty-four buildings, remained, despite protests by Indianapolis preservationists. The remaining structures were placed on the National Register of Historic Places. Eleven new buildings were constructed, and the original buildings were renovated. The new total housing units of the complex is 493, including 199 in the original structures.

The area now serves as an apartment complex on the IUPUI university campus, although urban professionals are invited to live there as well.

== See also ==
- 1969 Indianapolis riots
- List of African-American neighborhoods
- List of neighborhoods in Indianapolis
- National Register of Historic Places listings in Center Township, Marion County, Indiana
