= Indiana Avenue =

Historic and cultural district in Indianapolis, Indiana, US

- Indiana Avenue Historic District
- U.S. National Register of Historic Places
- U.S. Historic district
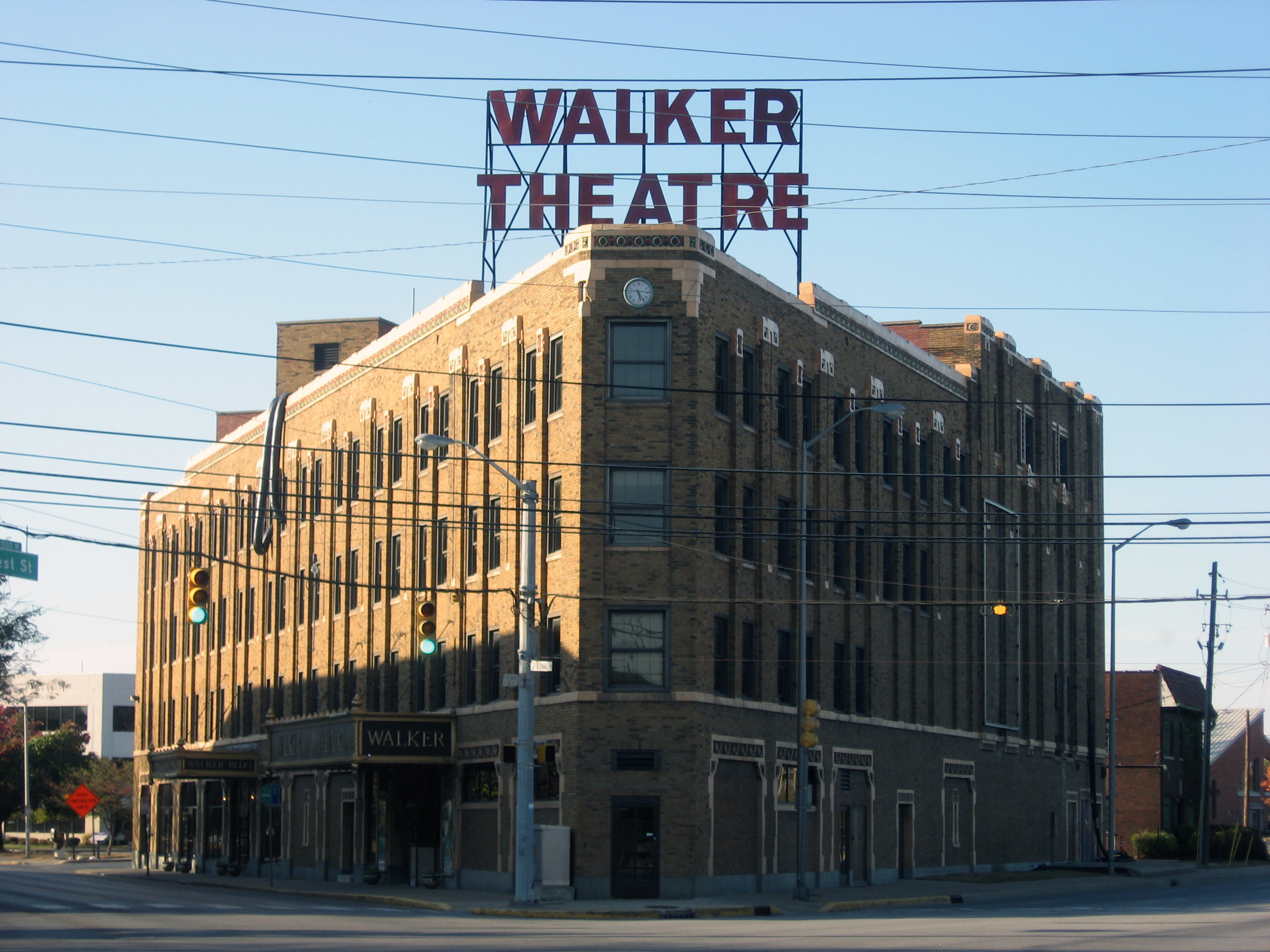
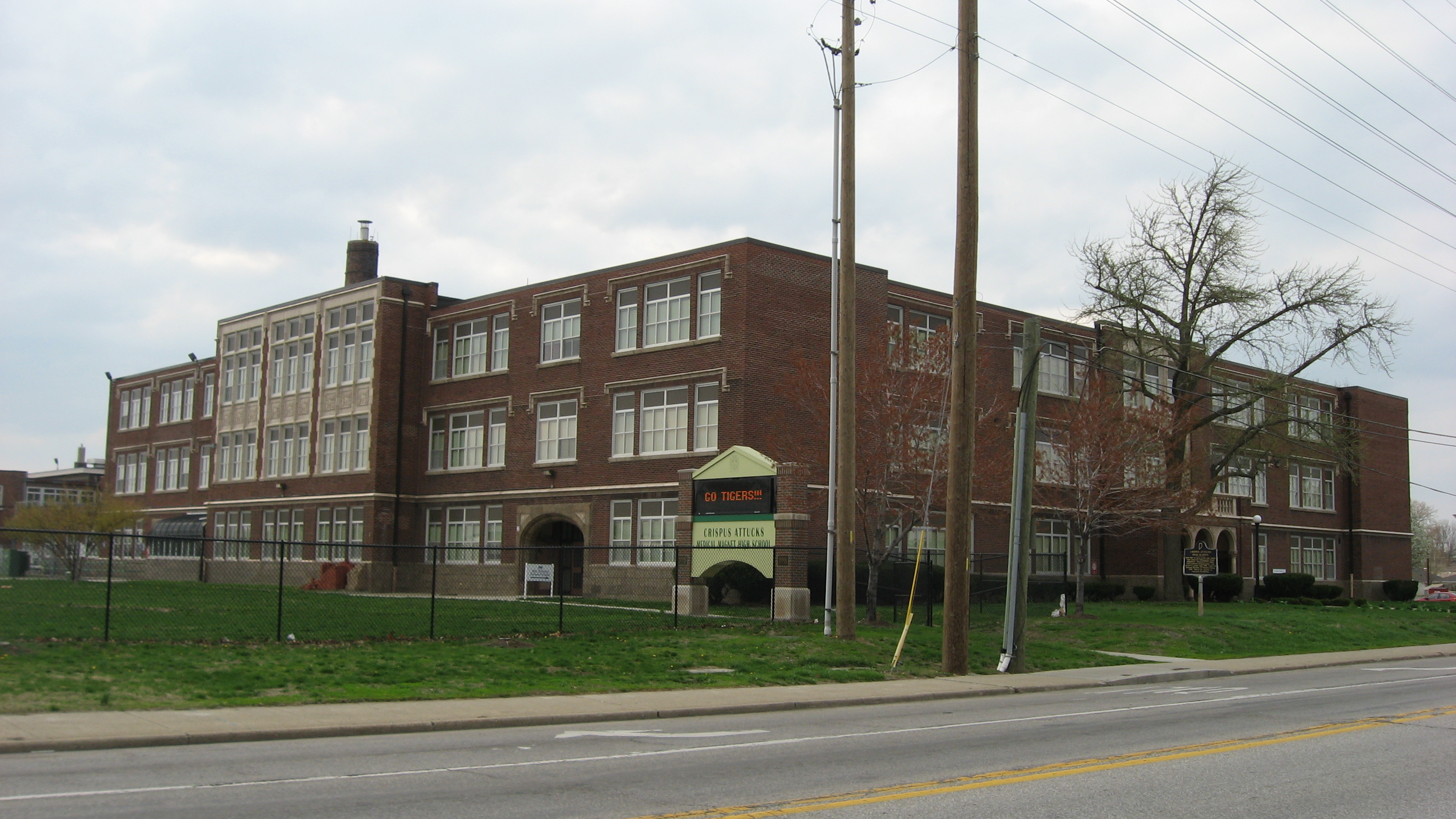
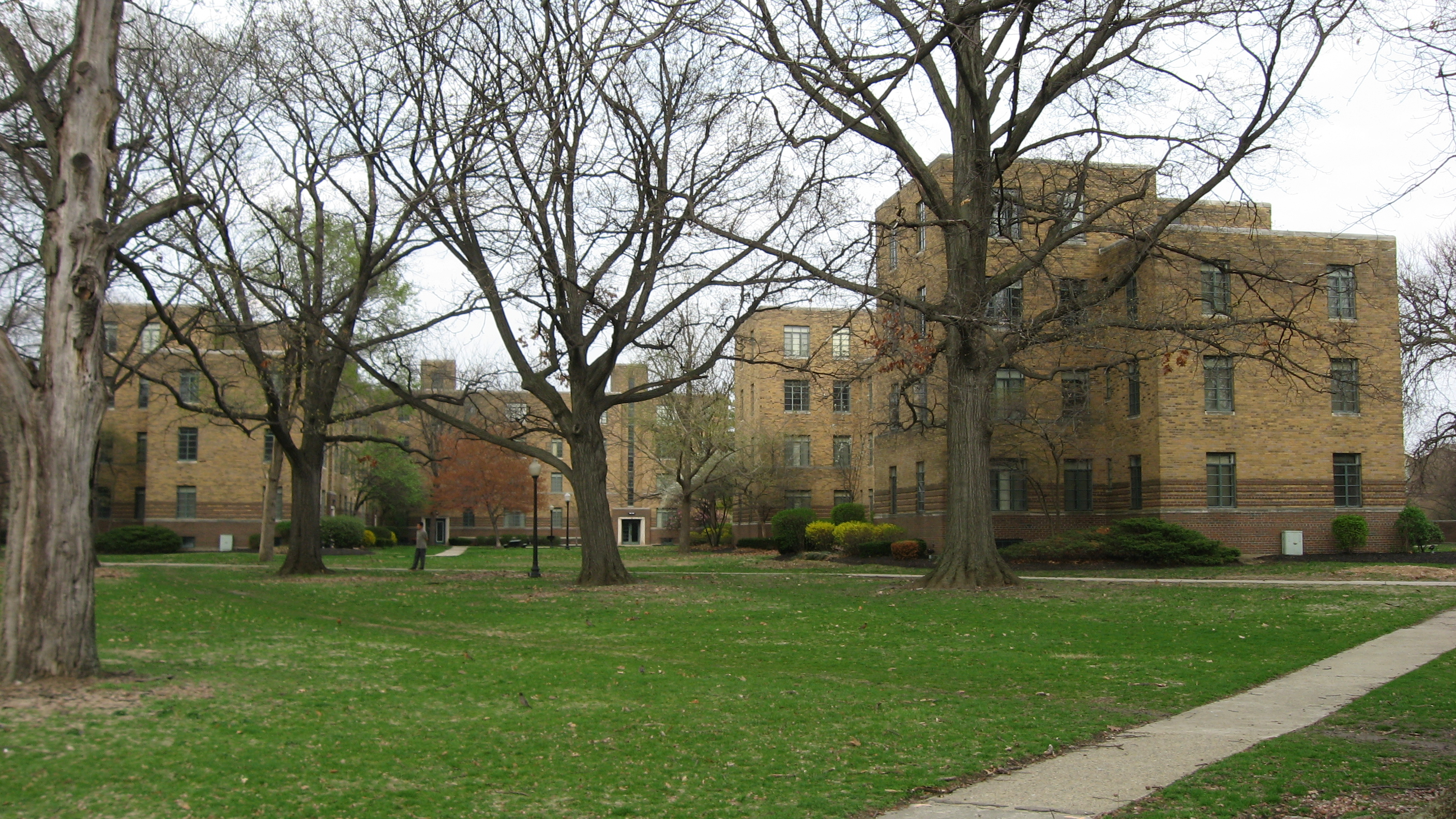
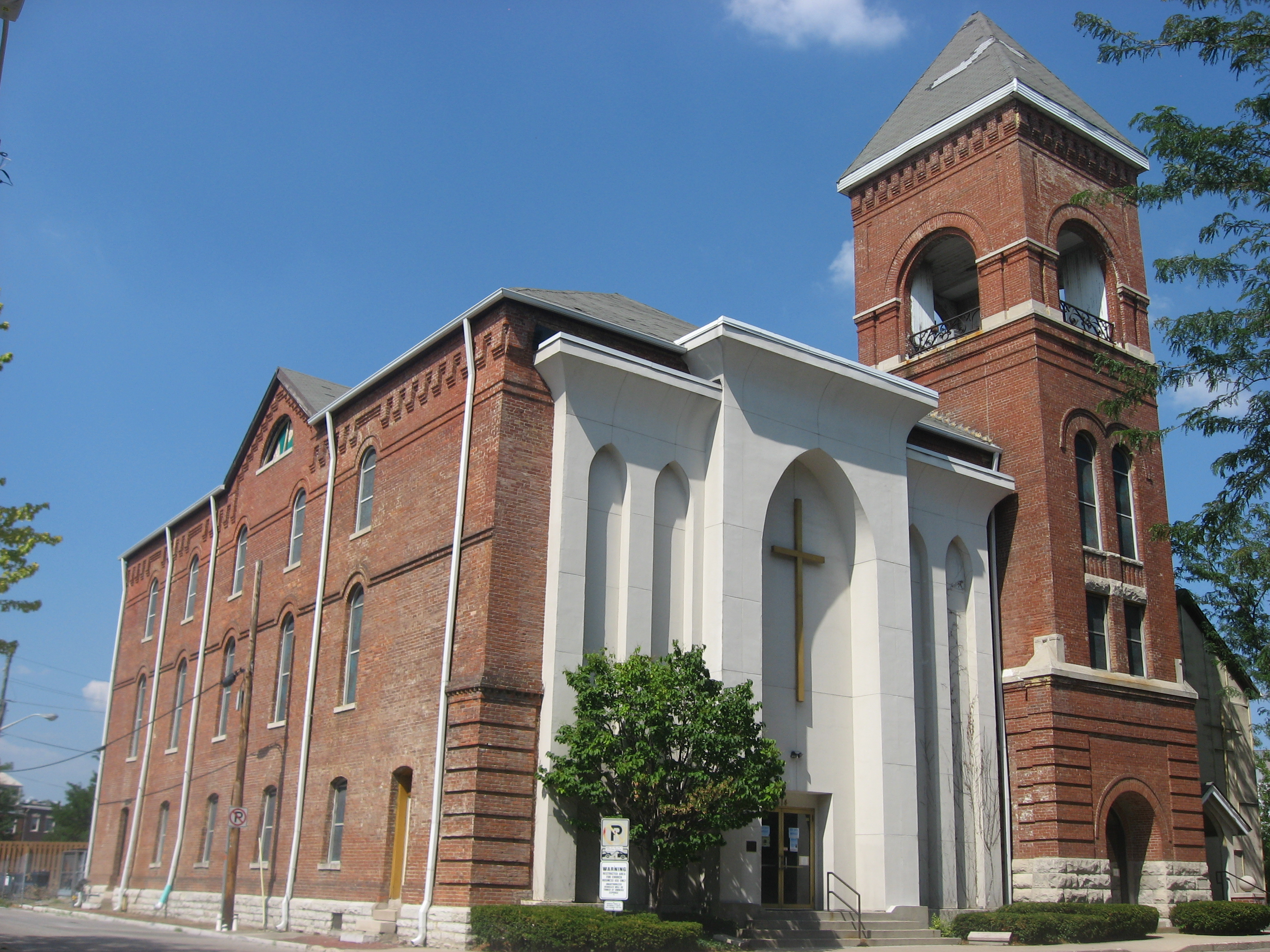
- Clockwise from top left: Madam Walker Legacy Center, Crispus Attucks High School, Bethel A.M.E. Church, and Lockefield Gardens

- Location within Indianapolis Location within Indiana Location within the United States
- Location: 500 block of Indiana Ave. between North St., Central Canal, Michigan, and West Sts., Indianapolis, Indiana
- Coordinates: 39°46′29″N 86°9′57″W
- Area: 3 acres (1.2 ha)
- Built: 1869-1935
- Architectural style: Italianate
- NRHP reference No.: 87000912
- Added to NRHP: June 12, 1987

Indiana Avenue is a historic area and designated cultural district in Indianapolis, Indiana, United States. Indiana Avenue was, during its glory days, an African American cultural center of the area. The Indiana Avenue Historic District within the area was designated a United States national historic district in 1987.

Many prominent historical figures have their roots on Indiana Avenue: Madam C.J. Walker, jazz greats including Freddie Hubbard, Jimmy Coe, Noble Sissle, Erroll "Groundhog" Grandy and Wes Montgomery. Mary Ellen Cable was one of the most important African American educators in Indianapolis. Coupled with her work as an educator, she organized and served as the first president of Indiana's NAACP chapter.

== History ==
In 1870, 974 African Americans (one third of the city's African American population) called Indiana Avenue home. This represented a shift in racial demographics away from the mostly working class poor population of Irish and German immigrants that lived around Indiana Avenue during the early years of Indianapolis. As the African American population increased, black entrepreneurs opened businesses on practically every corner. Bethel A.M.E. Church, the oldest African American congregation in Indianapolis, was organized in 1836. African American owned businesses opened on the Avenue by at least by 1865, including a grocery store owned by Samuel G. Smothers and a "peddler shop" owned by William Franklin. The Indianapolis Leader, the first black owned newspaper in Indianapolis, catered to the interests of the growing African American population and featured advertisements for Indiana Avenue businesses. The Leader began publishing in the 1870s.

The Great Migration resulted in the settlement of a sizable African American community along the Avenue. In 1927, the Madam C. J. Walker Building opened. The building and the theater within is named for Madam C. J. Walker, an African American entrepreneur, philanthropist, and activist who began her beauty empire in Indianapolis. Indiana Avenue was home to a notable jazz scene from the 1920s through the 1960s, producing greats such as David Baker, Slide Hampton, Freddie Hubbard, J. J. Johnson, James Spaulding, and the Montgomery Brothers (Buddy, Monk, and Wes). Wes Montgomery is considered one of the most influential jazz guitarists of all time, and is credited with popularizing the "Naptown Sound."

The avenue continued to culturally develop, in much the same way as the Harlem Renaissance. Due to the nature of segregation and Jim Crow laws, several streets developed similarly in other cities, including Beale Street in Memphis and 12th and Vine in Kansas City according to the book, Indiana Avenue: Black Entertainment Boulevard by C. Nickerson Bolden. Like Indiana Avenue, these streets were stops along the Chitlin' Circuit because of the large concentration of black-oriented clubs, businesses and entertainment venues.

== Madam Walker Theatre ==
Madam Walker's daughter helped build the Madam Walker Theatre, which opened on the Avenue in 1927 and quickly became known as the "Crown Jewel of the Avenue".

== Decline ==
As segregation laws began to change in the late 1950s, the African American middle class began leaving the once-bustling Indiana Avenue corridor for greater opportunities in northwestern Marion County, settling in Pike and Washington Townships. By 1965, the plight of the community left the Madam Walker Building closed to abandonment, removing a vital economic anchor for the area. The Madam C. J. Walker Manufacturing Company remained in the ailing building. By the early 1970s, Indiana Avenue was suffering from severe urban blight, with much of the area's building stock cleared for the development of the Indiana University–Purdue University Indianapolis (IUPUI) campus.

== Historic district and revival ==
By the 1980s, instead of the city attempting renewal or regeneration, much of the area was demolished and replaced by office buildings or townhouses. In 1987, the area, containing eleven historic buildings, was declared a United States national historic district. The district was developed between about 1869 and 1935, and includes representative examples of Italianate style architecture. The Madam Walker Building, one of the historic buildings, was restored and reopened to the public in 1988 with a focus on the performing arts.

Through the financial support of the Indianapolis Cultural Development Commission, formed by Mayor Bart Peterson in 2002, community stakeholders are planning the regeneration of the area. On March 28, 2007, the name of Indiana Avenue north of 10th Street and south of 16th Street was restored, after having been called Stadium Drive since 1932.

== See also ==
- Indianapolis Cultural Districts
- List of African-American neighborhoods
- List of neighborhoods in Indianapolis
- National Register of Historic Places listings in Center Township, Marion County, Indiana
