= Anne Campbell =

Ann(e) Campbell may refer to:

- Anne Campbell (politician) (born 1940), British MP
- Anne Campbell (academic) (1951–2017), British academic
- Anne Campbell (conductor) (1912–2011), Canadian choir conductor
- Anne Campbell (poet) (1888–1984), American poet
- Ann Campbell (sailor) in Clifford Day Mallory Cup

== See also ==
- Annie Campbell, fictional character
- Anna Campbell (1991–2018), British-Kurdish soldier
