= Newspaper poetry =

Genre of poetry

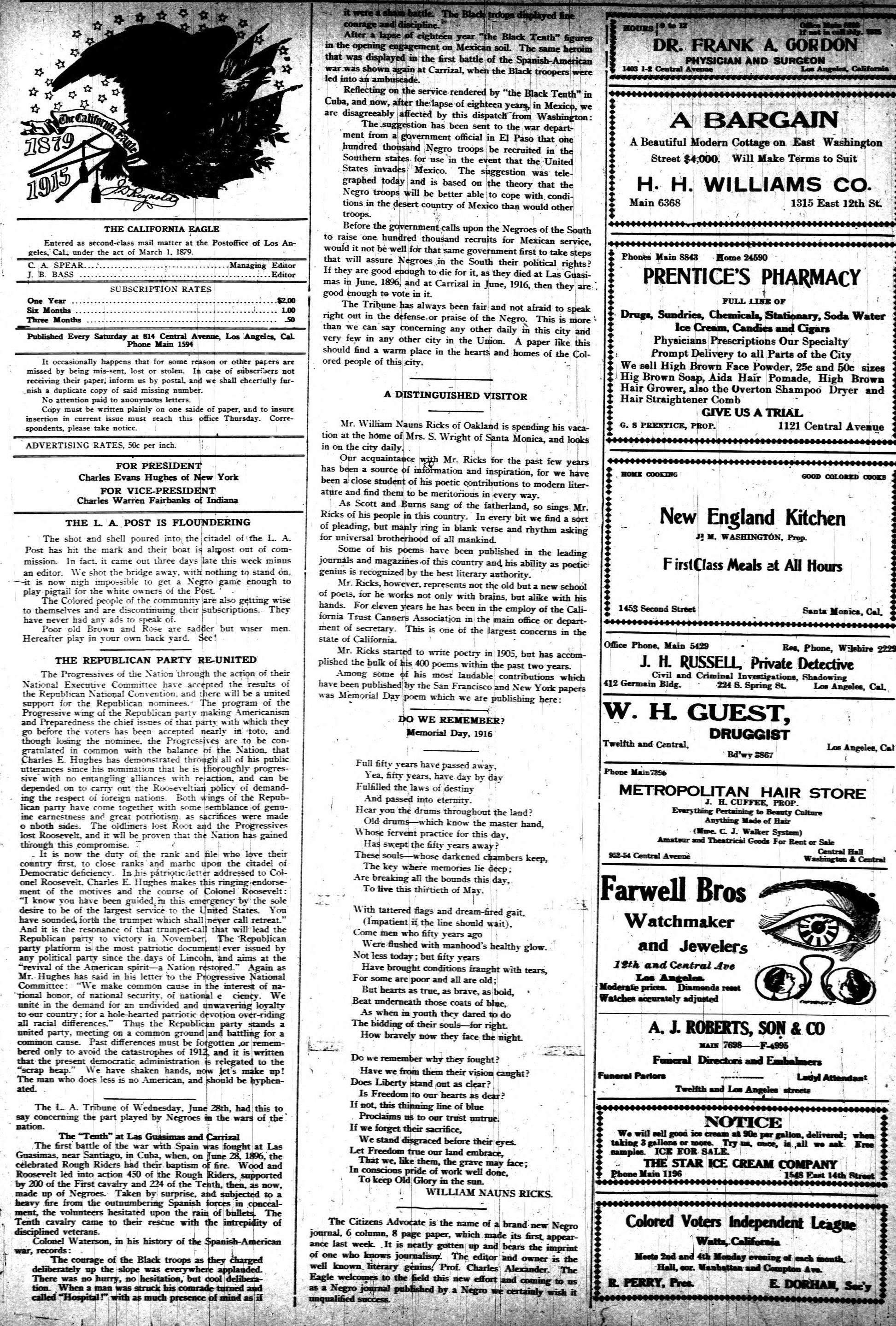
Page of the California Eagle, 1916, featuring an occasional poem on Memorial Day by William Nauns Ricks (bottom centre column).

Poetry published in newspapers, known as newspaper poetry or sometimes magazine verse, was a common feature of 19th- and early 20th-century Anglo-American literary culture.

== Nomenclature ==
At its most basic, 'newspaper poetry' refers to poetry that appears in a newspaper. In 19th-century usage, the term acquired aesthetic overtones. Lorang, discussing newspaper poetry's reception in the United States, observes that '[p]erhaps the most commonly espoused view was that newspaper poetry was light verse unworthy of the space it required and unworthy of significant consideration'. This view had detractors, however. Some American critics saw newspaper poetry as a particularly democratic art form, while others saw genuine artistic merit in the genre.

== Background ==
Poetry had an elevated standing in the 19th century imagination, at least in Britain. (Note: As Thomas Carlyle wrote in On Heroes, Hero-Worship, and The Heroic in History: '[t]he Poet is a heroic figure belonging to all ages … Let Nature send a Hero-soul; in no age is it other than possible that he may be shaped into a Poet'. Carlyle, Thomas (1840). "Lecture III" . On Heroes, Hero-Worship, and the Heroic in History. London: James Fraser – via Wikisource. See Hughes 2007, pp. 93–94.) Accordingly, it was reasonable for newspaper editors to suppose that publishing poems would advance their literary stature. A fair proportion of newspaper poems, however, were of the sentimental variety.

Blair argues that, despite their sometimes 'derivative' character, newspaper poems 'operate as sophisticated and often politically charged reflections upon current events, as well as upon the practice and purpose of poetry'.

Although present-day criticism tends to privilege the novel, that genre was not the primary means by which 19th-century readers encountered the written word. Rather, Mussell notes, that title likely goes to the newspaper. Books were expensive; newspapers were cheap. The average reader encountered literature through a journalistic middleman: as they do in the present day, 19th-century newspapers functioned as intermediaries between the elite world of letters and the popular audience.

For poets, newspapers and other periodicals offered a more dependable source of income and a larger readership than standalone book publishing. They also gave poets the opportunity to gain a following that might eventually turn into a book publishing deal.

== United Kingdom ==
Newspaper poetry met with critical comment in a 1791 edition of the Monthly Review, where an anthology of newspaper poems featuring the likes of Hannah Cowley, Mary Robinson, and Richard Brinsley Sheridan was discussed:

Newspapers, considered as poetical repositories, may be compared to pleasure-gardens badly kept; where more nettles appear than roses, and where a beautiful flower often loses the admiration to which it is entitled, in consequence of its being obscured by surrounding weeds. Hence newspaper poetry has sunk under one indiscriminate condemnation.

Newspaper poems in the United Kingdom were often published anonymously. As might be expected, British newspaper poems frequently commented on events of the day. In 2018, the extent of newspaper poetry in Scotland was considered in a Carnegie Trust and Leverhulme Trust research project, which re-published 1000 examples of poems (or songs) in an online resource of protest, citizenship and rights, The People's Voice: Political Poetry, Song and the Franchise, 1832-1918'. Kirstie Blair said 'it is important to remember that the very existence of a ‘Poet’s Corner’ and the critical forum of the ‘Notices to Correspondents’, in almost every local paper across Scotland, in itself had a significant relationship to the franchise debate'; in 2016 she edited The Poets of the People's Journal: Newspaper Poetry in Victorian Scotland '', choosing 100 examples, whose 'concerns and interests often chime, more than we might expect, with issues still very much current in the modern day.'

Local newspapers in 19th-century Britain, whose circulation in the aggregate surpassed that of newspapers in major metropolitan areas, frequently included a poetry section. Hobbs reports that a total of roughly 5 million poems were published in British local newspapers in the 19th century. (Note: This total includes duplicates, but Hobbs notes at 489 that '[a] surprisingly small percentage of poems appeared in more than one paper'.) Such papers would print both new poems and works by well-known authors—Shakespeare, Tennyson, Longfellow, and the like.

Hobbs, in his study of 19th-century British newspaper poetry, observes that newspaper poems of that period challenge present-day notions of genre. Newspaper poems were not solely literary. In some cases, they were primarily a vehicle for commentary on current events; in others, they featured in advertisements. Poetry 'was imagined', Hobbs argues, 'as just another style of talking or writing'.

The introduction to an 1823 anthology of poetry published in the Bucks Chronicle, a local newspaper in Buckinghamshire first published in 1820, included this plea on behalf of the genre:

Newspaper [p]oetry has been condemned by a very old prejudice to a very unfortunate fate. It has usually shared the doom of those fragile records of mundane matters, whose columns permitted it … an effort at immortality, and after having afforded a smile or a sneer to those who did threw their eyes over it, has commonly passed away … to the land where all things are forgotten.

== United States ==
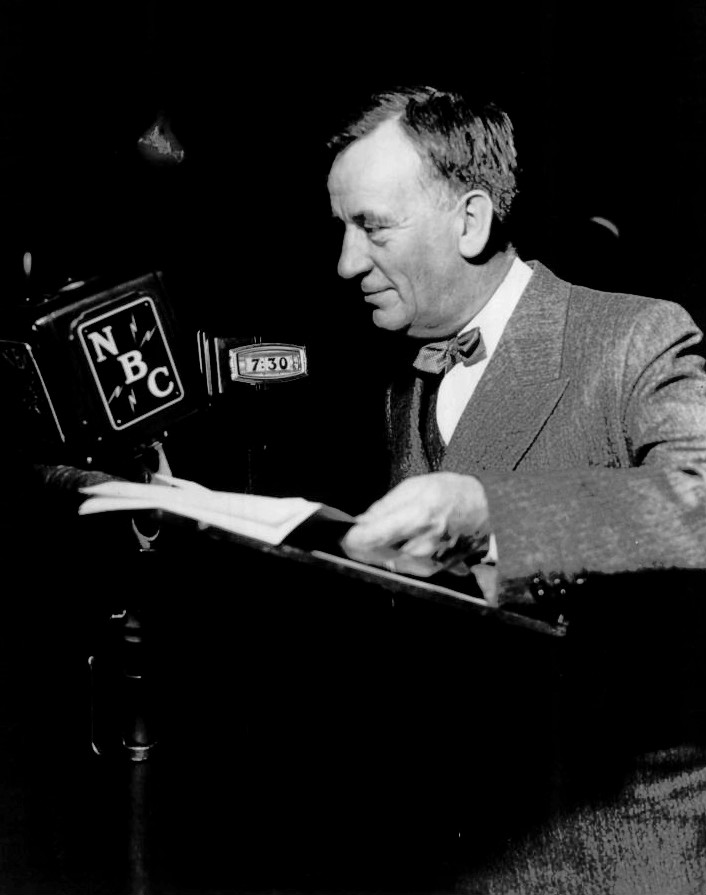
Edgar Guest, 'probably the most widely circulated newspaper poet of all time', first published in the Detroit Free Press in 1899.

American newspaper poetry dates at least from the Revolutionary era. Among the elements of the vibrant print culture of that period were poems, often satirical, in the many newspapers of the day.

Lorang argues, noting William Cullen Bryant and John Greenleaf Whittier were known in their day as 'newspaper poets', that poetry was 'ubiquitous' in 19th-century American newspapers. Douglas calls Edgar Guest 'probably the most widely circulated newspaper poet of all time'. Another popular American poet who began his career in newspapers (after being rejected from more elevated venues such as Scribner's Magazine and The Atlantic Monthly) was James Whitcomb Riley.

Newspaper poetry was among the ways Americans responded to the turmoil of the Civil War. Indeed, the volume of poems was large enough to attract notice from contemporary critics. Richard Grant White, for instance, observed in 1861 that 'the excited feeling of the country vented itself in verse to a most remarkable extent', and that newspapers 'filled column after column' with poetry. (Note: For one Civil War–era anthology of newspaper poems, published anonymously by 'A Volunteer in the U. S. Service', see Lyrics of a Day: or, Newspaper Poetry. New York: Carleton. 1864.) Fahs argues that newspaper poems were among the means that Confederates sought to develop a distinctively Southern nationalism.

Stein argues that the development of modernism following World War I heralded the demise of newspaper poetry's 'bourgeois … sensibility'. Evidently, however, newspaper poetry was common in the United States at least until the 1920s. T. Cholmondeley Frink, a character in Babbitt, a satirical novel by Sinclair Lewis, has a syndicated poetry column: Frink, Sinclair writes, 'was not only the author of "Poemulations," which, syndicated daily in sixty-seven leading newspapers, gave him one of the largest audiences of any poet in the world, but also an optimistic lecturer and the creator of "Ads that Add"'.

== Notable newspaper poets ==
- William Cullen Bryant
- Anne Campbell
- Hannah Cowley
- Harry Dashboard
- Edgar Guest
- Dennis Osadebay
- William Nauns Ricks
- James Whitcomb Riley
- Mary Robinson
- Richard Brinsley Sheridan
- John Greenleaf Whittier

== Sources ==
- Blair, Kirstie (2014). "'A Very Poetical Town': Newspaper Poetry and the Working-Class Poet in Victorian Dundee". Victorian Poetry. 52 (1): 89–109. ISSN 0042-5206. JSTOR 43592678.
- Fahs, Alice (2001). The Imagined Civil War: Popular Literature of the North and South, 1861–1865. Chapel Hill, North Carolina: University of North Carolina Press. ISBN 978-0-8078-9929-8. OCLC 698114957.
- Hobbs, Andrew (2012). "Five Million Poems, or the Local Press as Poetry Publisher, 1800–1900". Victorian Periodicals Review. 45 (4): 488–492. doi:10.1353/vpr.2012.0044. ISSN 1712-526X. S2CID 161428494.
- Houston, Natalie M. (11 July 2008). "Newspaper Poems: Material Texts in the Public Sphere". Victorian Studies. 50 (2): 233–242. doi:10.2979/VIC.2008.50.2.233. ISSN 1527-2052. JSTOR 40060322. S2CID 144873396.
- Hughes, Linda K. (2007). "What the 'Wellesley Index' Left Out: Why Poetry Matters to Periodical Studies". Victorian Periodicals Review. 40 (2): 91–125. ISSN 0709-4698. JSTOR 20084182.
- Lorang, Elizabeth M. (2010). American Poetry and the Daily Newspaper from the Rise of the Penny Press to the New Journalism (PhD thesis). University of Nebraska–Lincoln.
- Mussell, James (2012). The Nineteenth-Century Press in the Digital Age. London: Palgrave Macmillan. doi:10.1057/9780230365469. ISBN 978-1-349-31392-1.
- Stein, Kevin (16 February 2011). Poetry's Afterlife: Verse in the Digital Age. Ann Arbor, Michigan: University of Michigan Press. doi:10.2307/j.ctv65swqh.7. ISBN 978-0-472-90040-4. JSTOR j.ctv65swqh.7.
- White, Richard Grant (1861). National Hymns. New York: Rudd & Carleton.
