= Kirstie Blair =

Scottish literary academic

Kirstie Blair FRSE
- Employer: University of Stirling
- Known for: research into Victorian literature and the working class writing, poetry and literature, and industrial heritage
- Notable work: Working Verse in Victorian Scotland: Poetry, Press, Community (2019) winner of two Saltire Society Literary Awards
- Awards: Fellow of the Royal Society of Edinburgh 2021

Kirstie Blair, FRSE is a Deputy Principal at the University of Stirling and became a Fellow of the Royal Society of Edinburgh in 2021. She specialises in Victorian literature and the working class writing, poetry and literature, and working with museums and industrial heritage sites to engage the community around them. Her book Working Verse in Victorian Scotland: Poetry, Press, Community' won the Saltire Society Book of the Year and Research Book of the Year awards in 2019.

== Education and career ==
Blair graduated MA from the University of Cambridge in 1997, won a two-year Kennedy Fellowship to Harvard University the following year, and completed her MPhil at St Anne's College, Oxford, in 2000. She completed her doctorate (DPhil) there two years later and in 2004 a Diploma in teaching and learning in Higher Education. She tutored at St Peter's College, Oxford, then her academic career moved to the University of Glasgow (2006–13) as a lecturer, then senior lecturer. In 2013 she became Chair at the University of Stirling. In 2016 she joined the University of Strathclyde as chair in English, serving as the Head of the School of Humanities from 2017 to 2020.

As well as researching Victorian literature, especially working-class writing and poetry, Blair has also studied links between literature and religion and literature and medicine. Her work is extending into children's literature of the period and current day popular material, known as fanfiction.

== Recent research ==
In 2006, Blair wrote Victorian Poetry and the Culture of the Heart which looked at medical as well as symbolic depictions of the heart. A review indicated that this 'element of Victorian poetry has been neglected; this book begins to redress this disregard in a fresh and exciting way, suggesting that there is more to the heart than just its beat.' She later wrote Form and Faith in Victorian Poetry and Religion in 2012, in which she was described as challenging the consensus of academia and said to be 'close to the bone' in claiming that some texts have been 'shortchanged by a bias in post-deconstructive scholarship'.

She was the recipient of grants from the Leverhulme Trust and Carnegie Trust, and in 2016 created an anthology of newspaper verse from Scotland: The Poets of the People's Journal: Newspaper Poetry in Victorian Scotland. Her work has included a two-year, Carnegie-funded collaboration with colleagues at Glasgow University producing The People's Voice: Political Poetry, Song and the Franchise, 1832-1918 in 2018. In sharing her findings, Blair commented 'it is important to remember that the very existence of a ‘Poet’s Corner’ and the critical forum of the ‘Notices to Correspondents’, in almost every local paper across Scotland, in itself had a significant relationship to the franchise debate'. She worked with Dr Lauren Weiss on 'Literary Bonds', funded by the Research Society for Victorian Periodicals, exploring Victorian mutual improvement societies' publications, and they jointly presented their findings at an Oxford seminar on Science, Medicine and Culture in the Nineteenth Century'.

In 2019, her Working Verse in Victorian Scotland: Poetry, Press, Community was described as a 'paradigm-shift' and as changing attitudes to working class literature. The Saltire Award jury named it the Scottish Book of the Year 2019, and also awarded it the Research Book of the Year with the judges stating that 'the fact that it is an important, significant piece of research did not discolour its enjoyability, with laugh out loud moments and fascinating facts.' Her engagement with local communities such as in Hamilton where she critiqued the nineteenth century local press's attitude to working-class writing, and debated if this formed part of the universal suffrage reformers' arguments (in showing that workers had suitable intellectual capacity).

Blair's research includes writers of what is widely considered 'bad poetry', such as Dundee's McGonagall. In 2019, Blair co-convened the British Association for Victorian Studies conference in the city, which brought 272 delegates from 14 countries, and claimed an inward investment of over £330,000. The location was chosen, she said, because of the 'combination of new and exciting developments such as the V&A, and Dundee's important Victorian heritage, like the Verdant Works and McManus building.' The event was given positive feedback from early career researchers and raised interest in Blair's research on working class poetry. Earlier (2017) Blair had joined the steering committee of the Scottish Centre for Victorian and Neo-Victorian Studies (SCVS) and in 2018 she presented the keynote speech at the founding of the Scottish Network for Nineteenth-Century European Cultures (SNNEC) titled: ‘Whose Cry is Liberty and Fatherland? Scottish Poets and European Nationalism’.

She is now working with Dr Mike Sanders and Dr Oliver Bett on an AHRC industrial heritage and literature project, called Piston, Pen & Press. Her major funded projects, including this (funded to almost £660,000) are listed by the UK research council. Working-class writers, including factory women, and relations to the radical press are often illustrated by concrete examples.

Blair's contribution to understanding the genre and her insight and analysis is in various references in The Cambridge Companion to Victorian Women's Poetry and also in The Oxford Handbook of the Oxford Movement.

Hre research is also referred to in a 2020 interdisciplinary study of the 'Fin-de-Siecle Scottish Revival.'

As a Fellow of the Royal Society of Edinburgh (2021), Blair is presenting with others on the 'new and engaging ways to encounter our past' in the RSE's Curious 2021 series of public outreach events, with a session entitled 'Nostalgia and applied games'.

Blair's current and past research publications are listed on ORCID and researchgate.

== See also ==
Blair's research has been cited on

- Vita Sackville-West
- John Keble
- Adelaide Anne Procter
- List of In Our Time programmes
- Robert Hall Baynes
- Heidi Thomson
- List of LGBT Catholics
- Newspaper poetry
- Alice Lucas (poet)
- Barbara Steel
