= Humbles =

Humbles is a surname. Notable people with the surname include:

- Adolphus Humbles (1845–1926), African-American merchant and toll road operator
- Albert Arthur Humbles (1910–1997), English cyclist
- Liam Humbles (born 2003), English footballer

== See also ==
- Humble (surname)
