= Woodland Cemetery (Richmond, Virginia) =

Historic African American cemetery

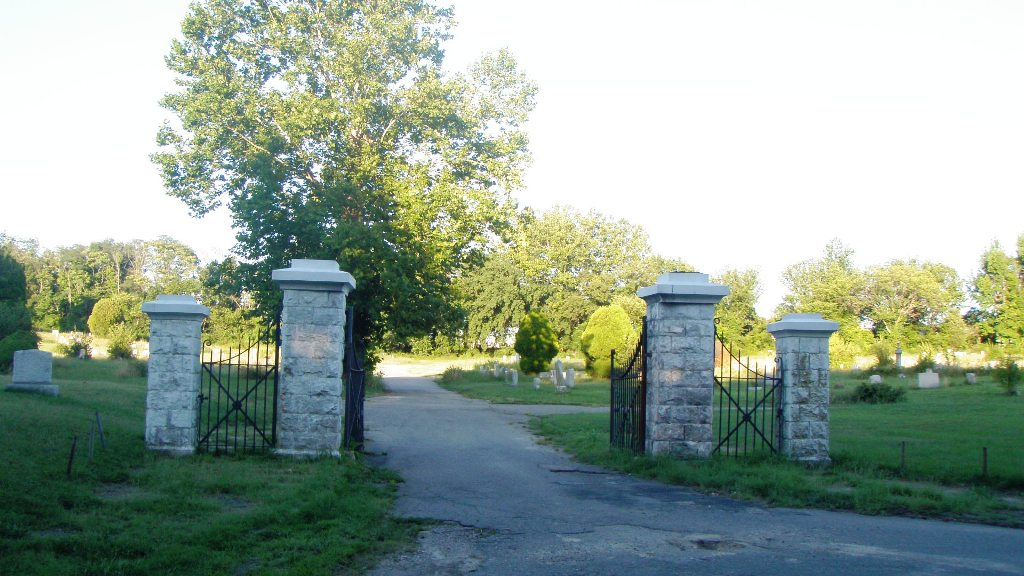
- Interactive map of Woodland Cemetery

Details
- Coordinates: 37°33′42″N 77°24′47″W
- Type: Private
- Owned by: Woodland Cemetery Restoration Foundation
- No. of interments: over 6,000
- Website: woodlandrestorationfoundation.org
- Find a Grave: Woodland Cemetery

Woodland Cemetery is a historically African American cemetery in Northeast Richmond, Virginia located directly east of the Highland Park neighborhood. Opening in 1916, it was built as a resting place for the Black elite of Richmond. Woodland was laid out in the shape of an arrowhead pointing north to symbolize the way enslaved blacks once looked north to freedom. The cemetery was listed on the National Register of Historic Places in 2026.

== History ==
The second largest African American cemetery in the area, Woodland is surpassed only by Evergreen Cemetery. The cemetery was founded and designed by Richmond Planet editor John Mitchell, Jr. The cemetery is designed in the rural cemetery style and incorporates winding roads on terraced slopes and laid out with concrete roads and pathways. The layout was inspired by the design of Hollywood Cemetery, designed by John Notman in 1847

Until about 1970, private cemeteries like Woodland and Evergreen Cemeteries were the only cemeteries open to African Americans for burial in the city of Richmond. The city-owned cemeteries remained segregated until over a century after slaves became free in America. As far back as the early 1900s, Woodland Cemetery was known as a prestigious place of interment for African Americans. Buried here are many of Richmond's Black elite, including leaders in the Civil Rights Movement, doctors, dentists, bank officers, a female African American spy for the Union and church leaders.

For many years, the cemetery saw serious neglect including overgrowth and dumping, In 1993, the city of Richmond stepped in to assist with a clean-up in anticipation of media coverage anticipated for the interment of Arthur Ashe.

In 2020, Woodland was purchased by local businessman Marvin Harris, founder of the Woodland Cemetery Restoration Foundation, which raised the funds to purchase the cemetery. Mr. Harris is also involved with efforts to restore nearby Historic Evergreen Cemetery. As of 2022, the foundation is working to raise more funding to complete the restoration process.

== List of notable interments ==
- Arthur Ashe (1943–1993), famed tennis player and humanitarian. Ashe was the first African-American to represent his country in Davis Cup play (1963), the first African-American man to win the U.S. Open singles title (1968), the first African-American man to win the Wimbledon singles title (1975), and the first African-American to captain the Davis Cup team (1981).
- Leslie Garland Bolling (1898–1955), early 20th century African-American wood carver
- William Washington Browne (1849–1897), founder of the Grand Fountain of the United Order of True Reformers.
- Zenobia Gilpin (c. 1898–1948), physician and clubwoman in Richmond
- John Jasper (1812–1901), founder and the first Reverend of the Sixth Mt. Zion Baptist Church. During the time before the Civil War, when slave marriages were not recognized as being legal, Mr. Jasper was authorized by the United States Freedman's Bureau to legalize slave marriages.
- Charles Thaddeus Russell (1875–1952), architect

== See also ==
- Evergreen Cemetery – African American cemetery in Richmond
