= 87 MacDonough Street =

Historic house in Brooklyn

Coordinates: 40°40′53″N 73°56′34″W

The house situated on 87 MacDonough Street in Bedford–Stuyvesant, Brooklyn has been included in the Bedford-Stuyvesant/Stuyvesant Heights Historic District since 1975. It is one of the oldest surviving structures in the neighborhood that dates back to its construction in 1863. It is currently owned by the United Order of Tents.

== Architecture ==
87 Macdonough St. is a freestanding mansion on an exceptionally large lot. Originally comprising both the main structure and an additional carriage house that opened onto Macon St. (the carriage house was sold and replaced with new construction in the 2010s), the mansion has almost 100 ft. of frontage on to Macdonough St. It displays a combination of Italianate and French Second Empire features.

The main structure of the house is characterized by a prominent square tower at the right of the entrance portico, a typical feature of an Italian villa. Other details include a French mansard roof, a two-story bay window facing the lawn at the East, and copious molding and other architectural flourishes typical of the period of its construction.

== History ==
87 Macdonough St. was originally built for William A. Parker, a local hops and malt merchant. However, Parker's residency was short-lived and James McMahon soon moved into the home. McMahon was the prominent founder of the Emigrant Industrial Savings Bank.

McMahon added a library, parlor, billiard room, and refined the exterior appearance of the home in order to match the booming construction of subway lines and new homes around him. By the time he died in 1913, the neighborhood had transformed into an upper-middle-class street.

Before the economic crash of the Great Depression in 1929, many new families were coming into the neighborhood, including Black families on the Great Migration, moving from the South to the Industrial North in search of jobs. However, this was not an easy transition. The NYC Historic District Council said, "Many white residents saw their presence as a threat to their neighborhood and reacted out of fear, anger, hostility, and discrimination." This led to the Home Owner's Loan Corporation that was notoriously known for giving certain districts scales ranging from A–D ratings for neighborhoods they considered "desirable for investments ".

The Bedford Historic District received a D rating, common around many neighborhoods that were home to immigrants and Black residents. As a result, development in this area was neglected and favored surrounding white neighborhoods. The Great Depression only increased this neglect and many Black families were left to fend for themselves in deteriorating conditions without government support. This urbanization and redlining of neighborhoods in New York City left the Black residents and other people of color to take action into their own hands. Many churches began popping up, along with "Block associations ". In this way, residents began community projects and actions to help their own neighborhoods and communities. The house at 87 MacDonough Street only reflected these actions because in 1945 the United Order of Tents took over occupation of the home, remaining there today.
