= William Nauns Ricks =

American poet (1876–1948)

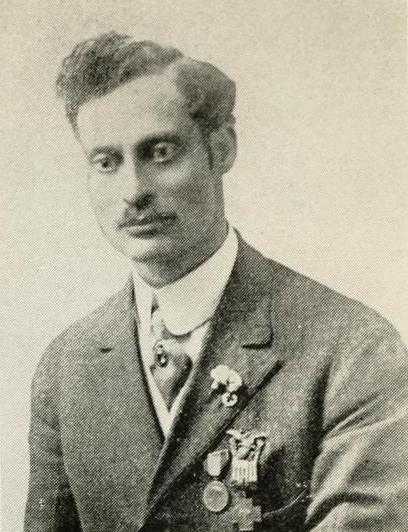
- Ricks c. 1919. The medals are likely from his Army service in the Spanish–American War.
- Born: September 6, 1876; Wytheville, Virginia, US
- Died: September 14, 1948 (aged 72); Oakland, California, US
- Resting place: Golden Gate National Cemetery
- Occupation: Poet
- Writing career
- Notable work: The Whistle Maker, and Other Poems

William Nauns Ricks (September 6, 1876 – September 14, 1948) was an American newspaper poet who lived and worked primarily in the San Francisco Bay Area. He published hundreds of poems, mainly in the popular press, and one collection.

Born in Virginia, Ricks moved to California in 1902 following his service in the Spanish–American War. His first poem was published in a newspaper in 1902, and he settled in San Francisco in 1904. He wrote on a wide variety of subjects, including issues of nation and race.

== Life ==
=== Early life (1876–1898) ===
Ricks was born in Wytheville, Virginia, to Lucy Phoebe and William Ricks in the last years of Reconstruction. Delilah Beasley, in an early 20th-century biographical compendium, says he was of "mixed Indian parentage" and claims he was a "direct descendant of Powhattan" through his mother. Beasley continues:

His maternal great grandfather was of Indian and Royal African blood. When quite a boy he realized that the few drops of African blood in his veins would make his life a difficult one. After seeing the lynching of a black youth he made a vow to himself that he would honor these drops of African blood by rendering service to the Negro (Note: The term is Beasley's. It was used routinely at the time to designate Americans of African descent. For the etymology, see Harper, Douglas. "Negro". Online Etymology Dictionary.) race.

Throughout his life, Ricks was affiliated with numerous fraternal associations and political causes. While a young man in Virginia, Ricks registered Black voters for the Republicans. At age 18, he moved to Roanoke, where he joined a lodge of the Grand United Order of Odd Fellows and was elected a Noble Grand. He also belonged to the Grand United Order of True Reformers (namesake of the True Reformer Building), which was, "[i]n the late 1880s and the 1890s, the dominant black fraternal society in Richmond and throughout Virginia".

=== Army years (1898–1902) ===
Ricks was an enlisted soldier in the Spanish–American War from 1898, when he joined the Army in Wytheville, to 1902, when he was discharged from a convalescent camp on Angel Island. He was evidently sick or injured while in the Philippines, as he was "invalided back" to the United States c. 1902, though Daniels notes that "[i]t is not clear whether he saw combat". He was a member of Company A of the 24th Infantry Regiment, which was composed primarily of Black soldiers. Daniels observes that Ricks's military service was one indicator of an "intense patriotism" that "was manifest throughout his life".

After the war, he joined the Military Order of Serpents, a fraternal society, and was elected an officer. The Order appears to have been constituted almost exclusively of veterans of the "Spanish War", as they called it. (Note: See, e.g., California's Diamond Jubilee: Celebrated at San Francisco, September 5 to 12, 1925. San Francisco: E.C. Brown. 1925. p. 88.)

=== California (1902–1948) ===
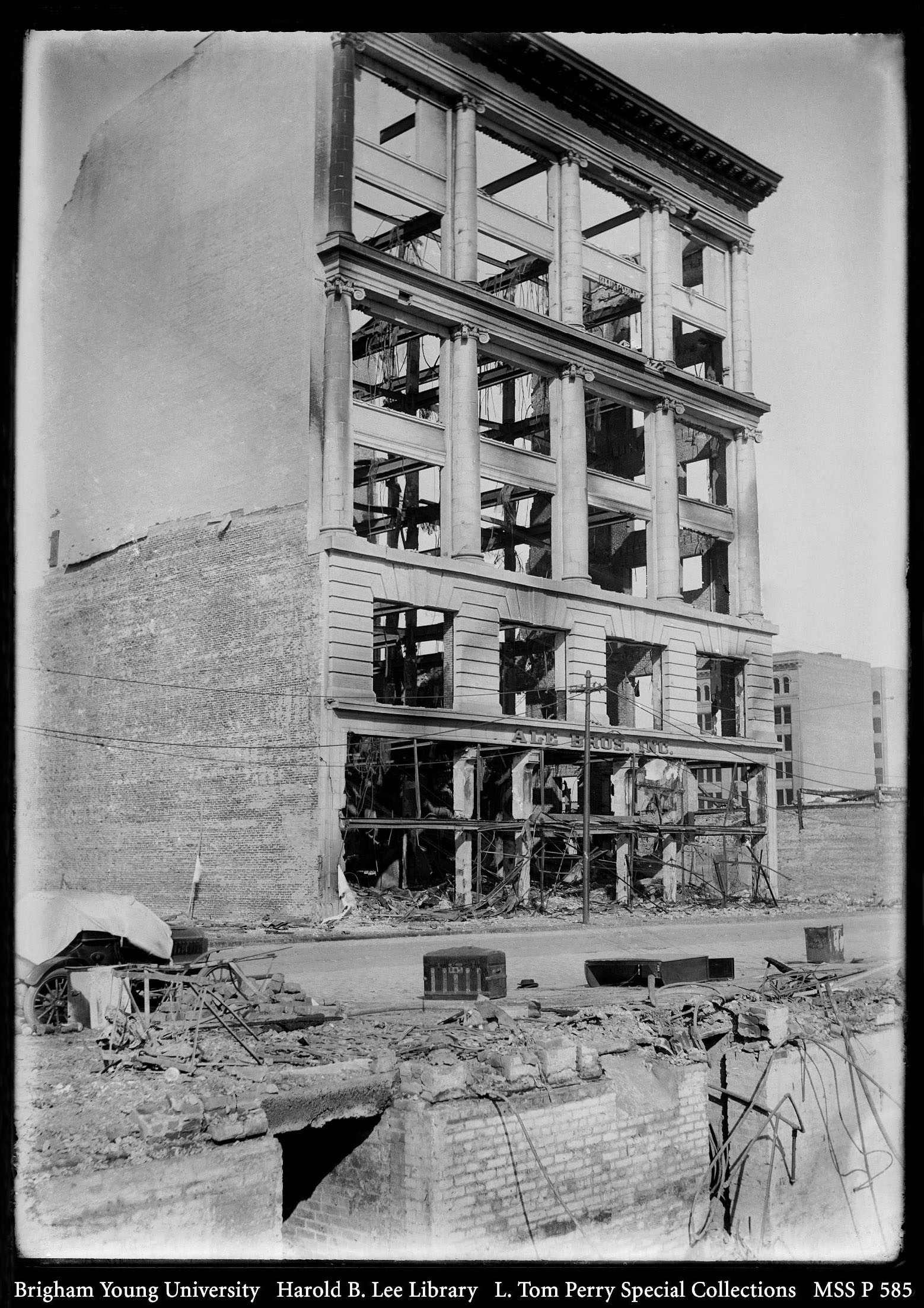
A building on Market Street after the 1906 San Francisco earthquake.

Ricks remained in California from after the war until his death. He lived first in Los Angeles and other cities in southern California and moved to San Francisco in 1904.

Relative to eastern states, California in the early 20th century did not have a large Black population. It started to grow substantially following World War II. California was nonetheless home to a variety of organizations, including the NAACP, that fought Jim Crow laws in the American West. Ricks was involved with the NAACP while in southern California. He was also a member of the Los Angeles Men's Forum, an organization founded in 1903 which aimed to "encourage united effort on the part of Negroes for their advance".

In San Francisco, he worked various jobs before becoming an office worker at the California Packing Company (later renamed Del Monte), where he remained until 1946, two years before his death. As of 1915–17, he lived at 120 Market Street in San Francisco. He remained involved in electoral politics in San Francisco, serving on the Republican State Central Committee and as a judge of elections.

Ricks was a cellist and singer. In 1915, he performed in a choral concert at the Hamilton Auditorium in Oakland. The community organized the concert as an alternative to the stage version of The Clansman: A Historical Romance of the Ku Klux Klan, which was performed for several weeks in San Francisco that year, beginning on March 1.

Ricks died on September 14, 1948, at a veterans' hospital in Oakland. He is buried in Golden Gate National Cemetery.

== Poetry ==
=== Overview ===
Ricks's poems deal with a wide variety of subjects. His papers, held at the Bancroft Library, include over 450 poems and almost 100 short stories. The 1914 work "The Whistle-Maker", after which Ricks's only collection is named, compares a performer who makes and plays whistles to figures in classical mythology such as Orpheus and Pan.

According to a biographical sketch of Ricks held by the California State Library—likely filled out by Ricks himself—he published work in the Los Angeles Times and Oakland Tribune, among many other newspapers, and lost a substantial amount of his work in the 1906 San Francisco fires. He first published in the Pasadena Daily News-Star in 1902. Newspaper poetry was quite common in early 20th-century America, and many of Ricks's poems—of which he published hundreds—were featured in the popular press.

According to a 1940 article in the California Eagle, one of Ricks's poems was included in the "largest book of poetry in the world", exhibited at the 1939 World's Fair.

=== Political and social themes ===
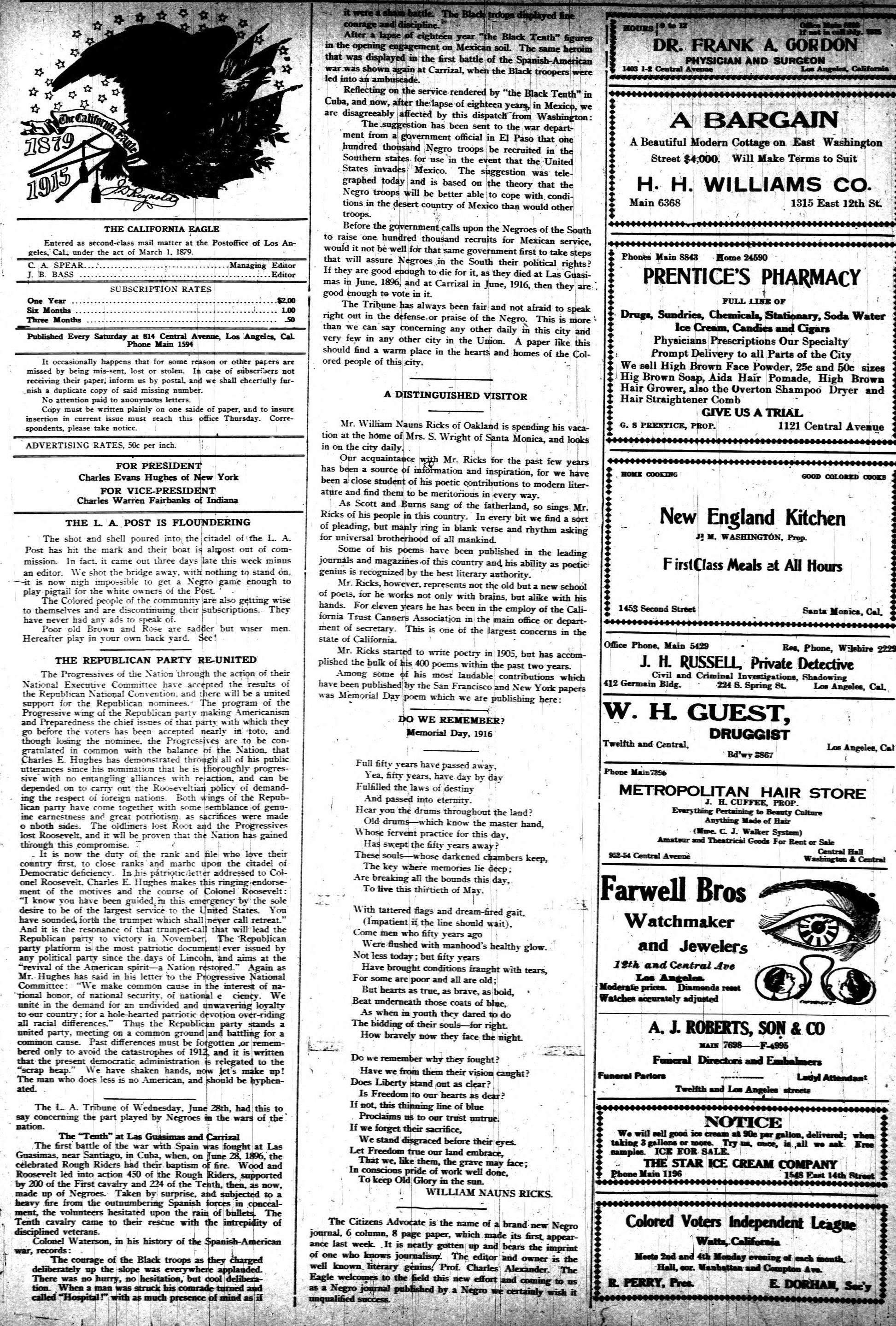
"Do We Remember", in the California Eagle, 1916 (bottom center column).

Among the many subjects Ricks treated in his work were political and social issues, including the oppression of Black Americans and hopes for racial progress in the United States.

"Lynched—At Waco, and on Calvary" (1916) compares lynching to crucifixion. Given the title and date of composition, Ricks likely responds in the work to the 1916 lynching of Jesse Washington in Waco, Texas.

Introducing "Do We Remember?—Memorial Day, 1916", published in the Eagle that year, an anonymous commentator wrote:

As Scott and Burns sang of the fatherland, so sings Mr. Ricks of his people in this country. In every bit we find a sort of pleading, but manly ring in blank verse and rhythm asking for universal brotherhood of all mankind.

The poem presumably refers to the end of the Civil War in 1865, given its frequent reference to events 50 years prior. It is composed in quatrains of iambic tetrameter. Ricks writes in the final stanza:

Do we remember why they fought?
Have we from them their vision caught?
Does Liberty stand out as clear?
Is Freedom to our hearts as dear?
...
Let Freedom true our land embrace,
That we, like them, the grave may face;
In conscious pride of work well done,
To keep Old Glory in the sun.

On July 1, 1917, an ode written by Ricks to Lieutenant Colonel Charles Young, the first African American to become an Army colonel, was given to Young at an event organized by the NAACP at which Young spoke. The poem, also in iambic tetrameter, began:

Could I portray in words of grace
The service you have done your race;
Could I but half such service do;
Then I might pen a song to you.

== Works ==
- Ricks, William Nauns (1914). The Whistle Maker and Other Poems . San Francisco: Press of Althof & Bahls. OCLC 1102352110 – via Wikisource.

== See also ==
- History of San Francisco

== Sources ==
- Beasley, Delilah Leontium (1919). The Negro Trail Blazers of California. Los Angeles. OCLC 1049895897.
- Bunch III, Lonnie G. (2015). ""The Greatest State for the Negro": Jefferson L. Edmonds, Black Propagandist of the California Dream". In deGraaf, Lawrence B.; Mulroy, Kevin; Taylor, Quintard (eds.). Seeking El Dorado: African Americans in California. Seattle: Autry Museum of the American West; University of Washington Press. pp. 129–48. ISBN 978-0-295-80531-3.
- Daniels, Douglas Henry (May 22, 2012). ""All God's Children Got Swing": The Black Renaissance in the San Francisco Bay Area, 1906–1941". In Wintz, Cary D.; Glasrud, Bruce A. (eds.). The Harlem Renaissance in the American West: The New Negro's Western Experience. New York: Routledge. pp. 83–110. ISBN 978-1-136-64911-0.
