= True Reformer Building =

- U.S. National Register of Historic Places
- U.S. Historic district – Contributing property
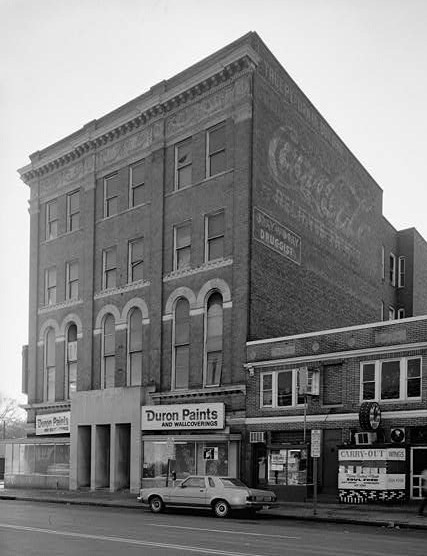
- True Reformer Building in 1979

- Location within Washington, D.C.
- Location: 1200 U Street, NW, Washington, District of Columbia, U.S.
- Coordinates: 38°55′0″N 77°1′43″W
- Area: 0.3 acres (0.12 ha)
- Built: 1903; 123 years ago
- Architect: John Anderson Lankford
- Part of: Greater U Street Historic District (ID93001129)
- NRHP reference No.: 88003063
- Added to NRHP: January 9, 1989

The True Reformer Building is an historic building constructed for the Grand United Order of True Reformers, an African American organization founded by William Washington Browne. The building is at 1200 U Street, Northwest, Washington, D.C. in the U Street Corridor (Cardozo/Shaw) neighborhood. It was designed by John Anderson Lankford. The building was commissioned by the Grand United Order of True Reformers in 1902. It was dedicated on July 15, 1903.

== Building history ==
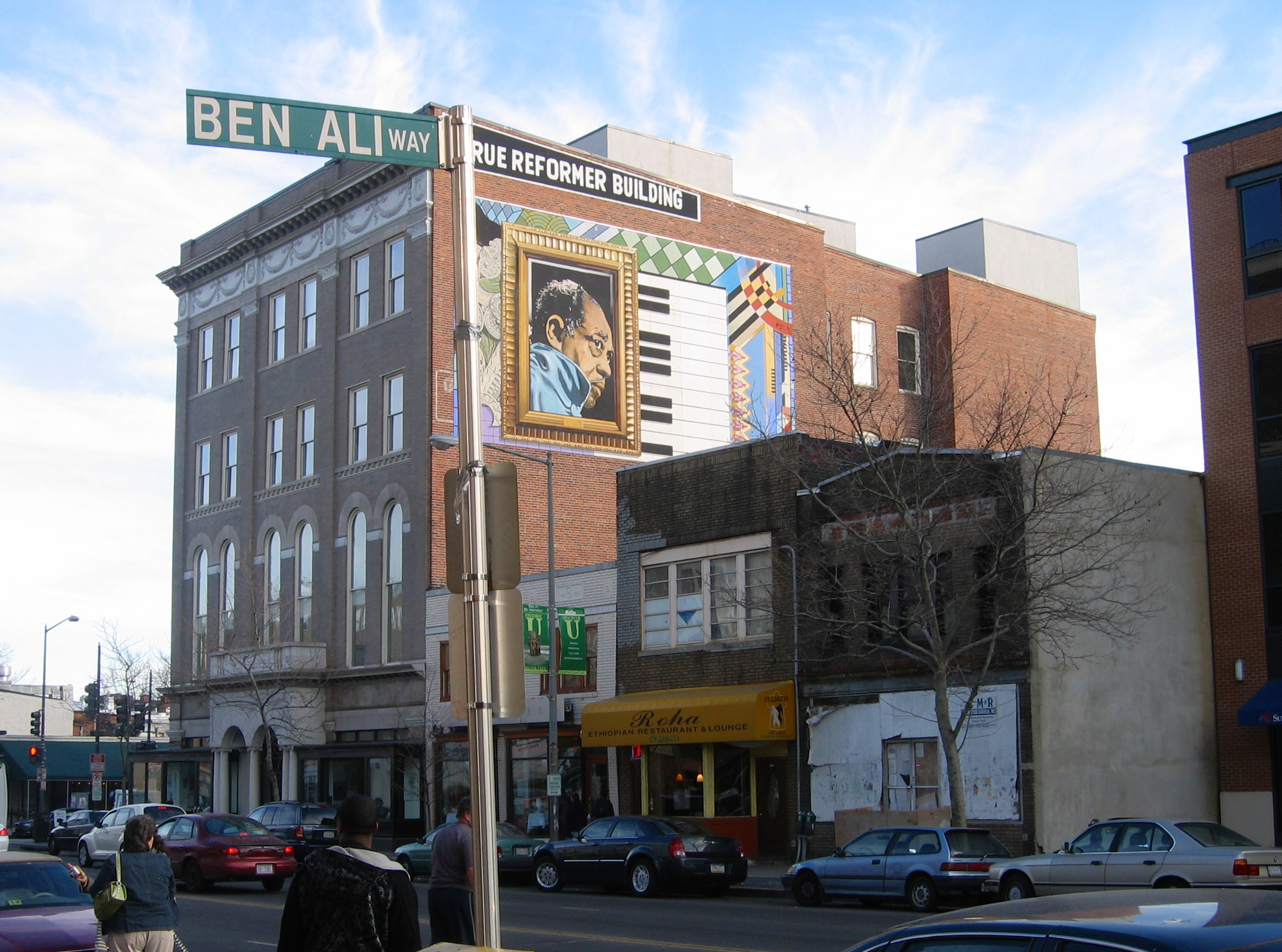
As seen from Ben's Chili Bowl in 2007 with Duke Ellington mural

Duke Ellington Mural

It was designed by John Anderson Lankford, the city’s first African-American registered architect. The building was commissioned by the Grand United Order of True Reformers in 1902, and was dedicated on July 15, 1903.

The Grand United Order of True Reformers started in 1873 as an African American fraternal association and temperance organization; and was re-organized in c. 1875 into the Grand Fountain of the United Order of True Reformers in Richmond, Virginia, as a business venture founded by William Washington Browne, before their dissolution in 1934. At one point, it was the largest black fraternal society and black-owned business in the United States. A .W. Holmes was president of the group in 1911 as retrenchment was sought and board membership included Adolphus Humbles of Lynchburg, Virginia.

During the True Reformer Building's dedication in 1903, the Reverend William Lee Taylor stated that the goal was to "put up a building in Washington that would reflect credit upon the Negro race." It is significant that the building took shape as a result of an African American architect, with African American financing, and built with African American hands. The Reformer Building was the first building in the United States to be designed, financed, built, and owned by the African American community after Reconstruction.

== Ownership changes ==
The Knights of Pythias bought the building in 1917.

From 1937 to 1959, the Boys Club of the Metropolitan Police of the District of Columbia, leased the building; Eleanor Roosevelt rededicated the building.

Other tenants have included: Washington Conservancy, the DC Chapter of the National Negro Business League, the First Separate Battalion. Duke Ellington gave his first performance here.

The building was listed on the National Register of Historic Places in 1989. The Public Welfare Foundation bought it in 1999. It was renovated from the winter of 2000 until February 2001 according to designs by Sorg & Associates.

== Public art ==
G. Byron Peck's mural to Duke Ellington on the side of the building used to overlook the U Street Metro station. It was completed in 1997, and located on the sidewall of Mood Indigo. It was relocated to the True Reformer Building. The mural was removed in 2012 for restoration. Its removal was made permanent in 2013 due to damage. On 3 May 2019 a replica of the mural was returned to the building
