= William Washington Browne =

American fraternal organization founder (1849–1897)

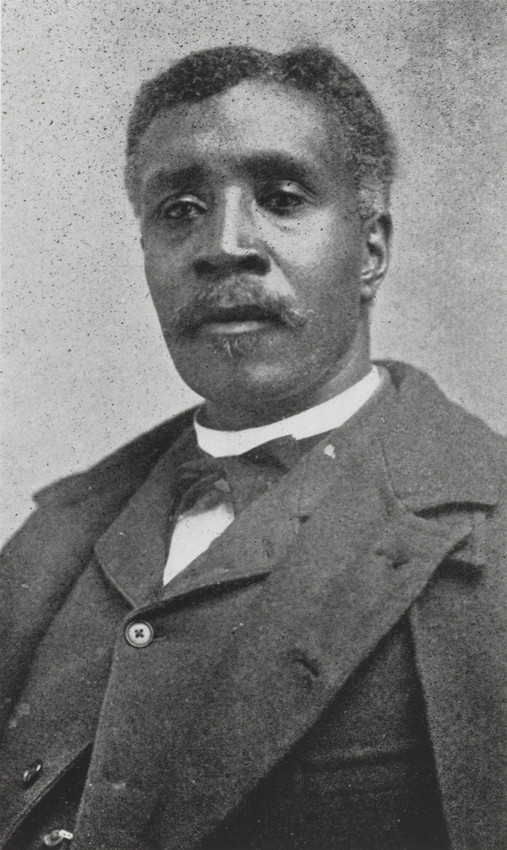
- Born: Ben Browne; October 20, 1849; Habersham County, Georgia, U.S.
- Died: December 21, 1897 (aged 48); Washington, D.C., U.S.
- Resting place: Woodland Cemetery (Richmond, Virginia)
- Occupations: Minister and fraternity administrator
- Employer: Leigh Street Methodist Episcopal Church
- Known for: Founder of Grand United Order of True Reformers

Rev. William Washington Browne (October 20, 1849 – December 21, 1897) was an African American fraternal society leader, temperance worker, and minister. He was the founder and head of the Grand United Order of True Reformers and the Grand Fountain of the United Order of True Reformers, a benevolent, temperance, and fraternal society for African Americans that was based in Richmond, Virginia.

== Early life ==
Ben Browne was born on October 20, 1849, into slavery on a Georgia plantation of Benjamin Pryor in Habersham County. His parents were Joseph Browne and Mariah Browne, both of whom were enslaved as field workers. As a child, he was the companion and servants of his enslaver's son.

Pryor died when Browne was eight years old. Pryor's widow remarried and sold the plantation with Browne's parents. She took Browne to her new home in Rome, Georgia. Now an urban slave, Browne was hired out as a storekeeper and, as the office boy of a lawyer. Around this time, Browne got permission from his enslaver to change his name to William Washington Browne, in recognition of George Washington. This request was tolerated but Browne's independent spirit was problematic for a slave.

He was sent to the slave pens and was sold to a horse trader from West Tennessee, around nine miles from Memphis. There, he was trained to be a jockey.

=== Civil War ===
When Memphis fell to Union army during the Civil War, his owners sent Browne to Mississippi. Browne escaped his owners, along with two boys, and traveled fifty miles to the Memphis. There, he found employment as a waiting boy for a caption of the 6th Missouri Infantry Regiment (Union). When slave owners started coming to the camp looking for runaways, Browne took employment with a Jewish family in town. When that relationship soured, he left Memphis by stowing away on a ship going to Cairo, Illinois.

Browne secured a position on the USS National, a gunboat on the Mississippi River. He remained there until he was discharged from service in 1862. After the surrender at Vicksburg and the Emancipation Proclamation in 1863, Browne attended school in Prairie du Chien, Wisconsin from September 1863 to September 1864. He enlisted and the U.S. Army when he was fifteen years old and was assigned to the 18th United States Colored Infantry Regiment at St. Louis, reaching the rank of sergeant major. He mustered out in March 1866 and returned to school in Prairie du Chin. His education was sporadic as he worked on a farm to pay his tuition but Browne finished in September 1869.

=== Post War ===
After the war, Browne was able to find his ailing mother by writing A. G. Pitner, his former enslaver. He returned to Georgia to be near her, taking a teaching position. He taught at various schools in Georgia and Alabama through March 1874. In Georgia, he converted and studied the ministry at an African Methodist Episcopal Church School in Atlanta (later called the Gammon Theological Seminary). He became an ordained minister with the Colored Methodist Episcopal Church in August 1876.

Browne became an outspoken proponent of the temperance movement and against the Ku Klux Klan, making speeches in Alabama and Georgia in the early 1870s. He sought the assistance of the Independent Order of Good Templars, a fraternal organization which was part of the temperance movement. However, he was denied membership because the society was traditionally white.

In late December 1880, Browne moved to Richmond, Virginia, having accepted a position with the Leigh Street Methodist Episcopal Church.

== Temperance and fraternal societies ==
=== Independent Order of Good Templars ===
In 1873, the Independent Order of Good Templars invited Browne and others to form a charter for African Americans, called the Grand United Order of True Reformers for African Americans. He left his teaching position in 1874 and started working for the Independent Order of Good Templars. Its Grand Lodge was soon established in Alabama, with Browne serving as a county deputy and, later, as its Grand Secretary. Browne founded fifteen chapters, called fountains, and was elected Grand Worthy Master on February 7, 1877. He published its newspaper, True Reformer, which circulated in most Southern states. As he traveled to various communities in this capacity, Browne became aware of the negative impact of poverty on the former slaves.

Although the organization was rapidly growing, Browne disliked being under the control of Whites. He felt that the society was poorly operated and was not fulfilling the needs of its members. Instead, he believed it could help with Black advancement and economic stability. However, when his scheme to start a related insurance program failed to pass the Alabama Legislature in 1880, he left Alabama and severed his connections with the True Reformers.

=== Grand Fountain of the United Order of True Reformers ===
On January 3, 1881, he was asked to spearhead a new branch of the temperance movement in Virginia, named the Grand Fountain of the United Order of True Reformers. He became its Grand Worthy Master of the State of Virginia on January 11, 1881. Following his vision from Alabama, Browne began shifting the organization from a temperance society to an insurance organization or benevolent society. He crafted the fraternal organization around "his gospel of education, racial solidarity and economic self-help". Under his leadership, the fraternal society revolutionized insurance for Blacks in Richmond and beyond, not only paying burial costs but also providing support for the survivors.

Browne still believe that African Americans needed money above all else and sought to turn the organization into a fair-wage employer for Black men and women. Under his guidance, the Grand Fountain grew into an organization that managed a bank, published a newspaper entitled the Reformer, owned a three-story office building, and operated a farm, a 150-room hotel, a concert hall, a 634 acre retirement home for Blacks. Part of Browne's vision was the True Reformers Saving Bank, the first Black-owned and Black-operated bank to receive a charter in the United States. Initially, the bank operated from Browne's home but was later housed in True Reformers Hall, a three-story office building. By pooling their resources, the bank's members could purchase homes, farms, and businesses.

By 1896, the Grand Fountain had 250 employees and 15,000 members. It had spread from Virginia into the upper South and Northern Cities. At one point, the Grand Fountain was the largest Black fraternal society and black-owned business in the United States. W. E. B. Du Bois said the Grand Fountain was "probably the most remarkable Negro organization in the country".

In 1897, Browne took a year of paid sick leave. When Browne died later that year, the Grand Fountain suffered crippling setbacks. Employee embezzlement at the bank resulted in defaulting on large unsecured loans, causing its collapse in 1910.

== Controversies and scandals ==
Browne gained a national reputation for his work with the Grand Fountain. However, he lost his job as a pastor because the Richmond Colored Methodist Episcopal Church bishop objected to the time Browne spent working for the Gand Fountain. Browne converted to the African Methodist Episcopal Church but never again oversaw a congregation. This demonstrates Browne's commitment and willing for self-sacrifice for the Grand Fountain; in the early 1880s, his salary from the True Believers was modest and often late. Later in life, Browne quarreled with others over back pay and an insurance policy that he felt he was owed by the Grand Fountain. He was paid nearly $30,000 of the $50,000 he was seeking before new national laws forbid this kind of payment for insurance workers. At the time, his salary was $1,800 a year.

Brown also got involved in a scandal in March 1895 when Northern politicians visited Richmond. Robert T. Teamoh an African American legislator from Massachusetts, and John Mitchell Jr., an African American newspaper publisher attempted to each lunch with the Governor of Virginia, instead of going to the designated "colored' dining room. When tensions rose in Richmond, Brown wrote a letter to the public criticizing Teamoh and Michell for making race relations worse and asking whites to not take their anger out on other Blacks, noting that most Blacks were in favor of segregation. Many Blacks began to view him as an "Uncle Tom", both in Richmond and across the United States. One the national level, Browne was associated with Black moderates such as Booker T. Washington.

Browne's disagreement with Mitchell turned into a battle for control of the Black newspaper market. Browne changed the Grand Fountain's monthly Reformer into a weekly newspaper, hoping to take over the market from Mitchell's Richmond Planet. He also fired the editor of the Reformer for publishing an editorial that seemed to support Mitchell. Although the Grand Fountain was not affiliated with the Baptist Church, he took control of another newspaper, Virginia Baptist. In 1896, Browne challenged Mitchell for the City Council seat for Jefferson Ward, Richmond; neither man won and the Democrats who oversaw local elections gave the council position to a white man.

== Honors ==
In 1895, he was one of eight men selected to present African Americans at the Cotton States and International Exposition in Atlanta.

== Personal life ==
While teaching in Alabama, Browne met and married Mary A. "Molly" Graham on August 16, 1873. The couple had no children but adopted a boy and a girl. Molly was a seamstress and supported the family with her work in the 1880s, during Browne's early years with the True Believers in Richmond. They lived at 105 West Jackson Street in Richmond.

In 1897, doctors found a cancerous tumor on Browne's arm but he declined its amputation. Browne died in Washington, D.C., on December 21, 1897, from cancer that spread from his arm. His funeral was large and featured many from Richmond's Black community. He was buried at Union Sycamore Cemetery in Richmond, part of Barton Heights Cemeteries, but was disinterred under the instructions of his widow and reinterred on May 4, 1918, in Woodland Cemetery in Richmond.

== See also ==
- True Reformer Building
