= Eliza Allen (Virginia) =

African American activist, clubwoman, and banker

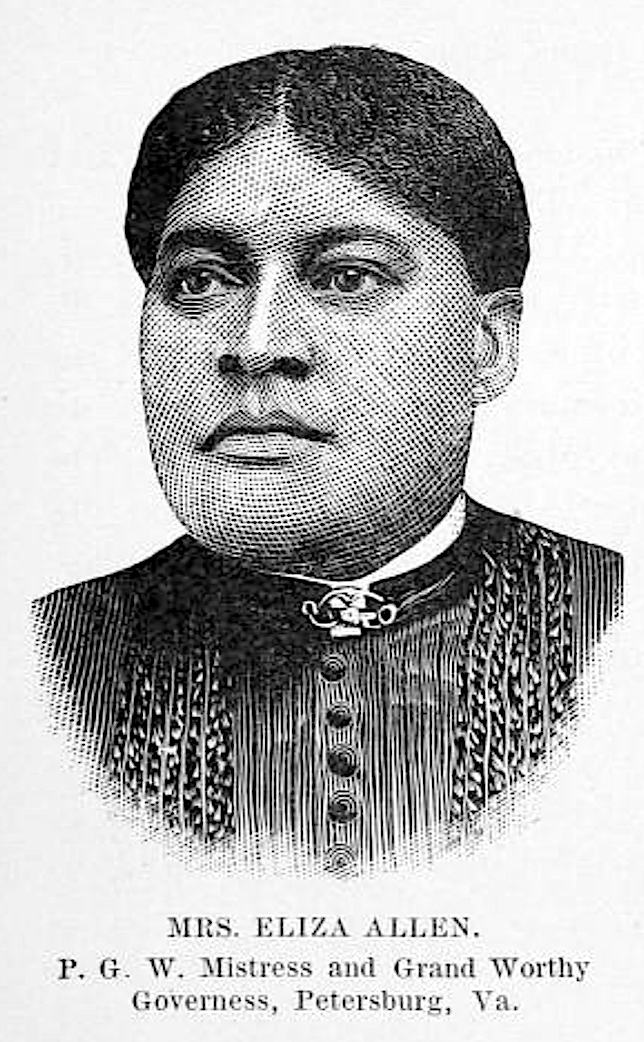
- Born: c. 1840; Westmoreland County, Virginia, US
- Died: 1910; Virginia, US
- Occupation: Bank officer
- Employer: True Reformers Savings Bank
- Organization(s): Grand United Order of True Reformers Grand United Order of Brothers and Sisters of Love and Charity; Independent Order of St. Luke United Order of Tents
- Known for: African American activist and clubwoman

Eliza Allen (born c. 1840 – after 1910) was an African American banker, activist, and clubwoman. She was a founder of the True Reformers Savings Bank, the first African-American-owned bank to be chartered in the United States. She was affiliated with several African American economic self-help organizations. Before the Civil War, she formed three societies to help enslaved women.

== Early life ==
Allen was born enslaved in Westmoreland County, Virginia around 1840 on the estate of Major Richard Beale. She joined the Methodist church as a child.

Later, Allen lived in Petersburg, Virginia with her enslaver, Professor W. T. Davis. In Petersburg, Allen formed three benevolent societies for enslaved women, including the Consolation Sisters, Sisters of Usefulness, and Tobitha. These groups helped the women share resources needed by their families and communities. Sisters of Usefulness had as many as thirty members. The societies met on Sunday afternoon and were required to have a white male at all meetings.

Her slave organizations ended with the start of the Civil War. During the war, Allen lived in Danville, Virginia where Davis operated the Methodist College for Females.

== Clubwoman ==
After the Civil War, Allen was involved with African American economic self-help and fraternal organizations, including the Order of the Eastern Star, Prince Hall, and the United Order of Tents, with whom she was a senior matron and board member. She was a member of the Independent Order of St. Luke, serving as its grand chief. She was a member of the Independent Order of Good Samaritans and Daughters of Samaria, serving as the Grand Presiding Daughter. She founded the Grand United Order of Brothers and Sisters of Love and Charity, serving in the role of all major officers in this group that operated in the United States and Liberia.

Allen joined the Grand United Order of True Reformers when it was reestablished in Richmond, Virginia in 1875. She then established one of its first three chapters, called fountains. She was the founder of the Shiloh Fountain No. 6 (later No. 20) in Petersburg, Virginia. In 1881, she was elected the national Grand Worthy Mistress of the United Order which served jointly with the Grand Worthy Master. She served in this office for six years. She continued to serve on the grand board as the Governess who oversaw the Rosebuds, the girl's arm of the order, from its founding in 1885 to 1892. When retired from the position, she was made Grand Worthy Governess for life.

== Banking ==
In 1888, when the Grand United Order of True Reformers started the True Reformers Savings Bank in Richmond, Allen was the only woman on its charter. In 1899, this became the first African American-owned and African American-operated bank to be chartered in the United States. In addition to banking services, the bank provided a youth education program and retirement home for African Americans.

== Personal life ==
After gaining her freedom, she married James Allen, a shoemaker from Petersburg. The couple had five children. She worked as a laundress.
