= James McColl House =

- U.S. National Register of Historic Places
- Michigan State Historic Site
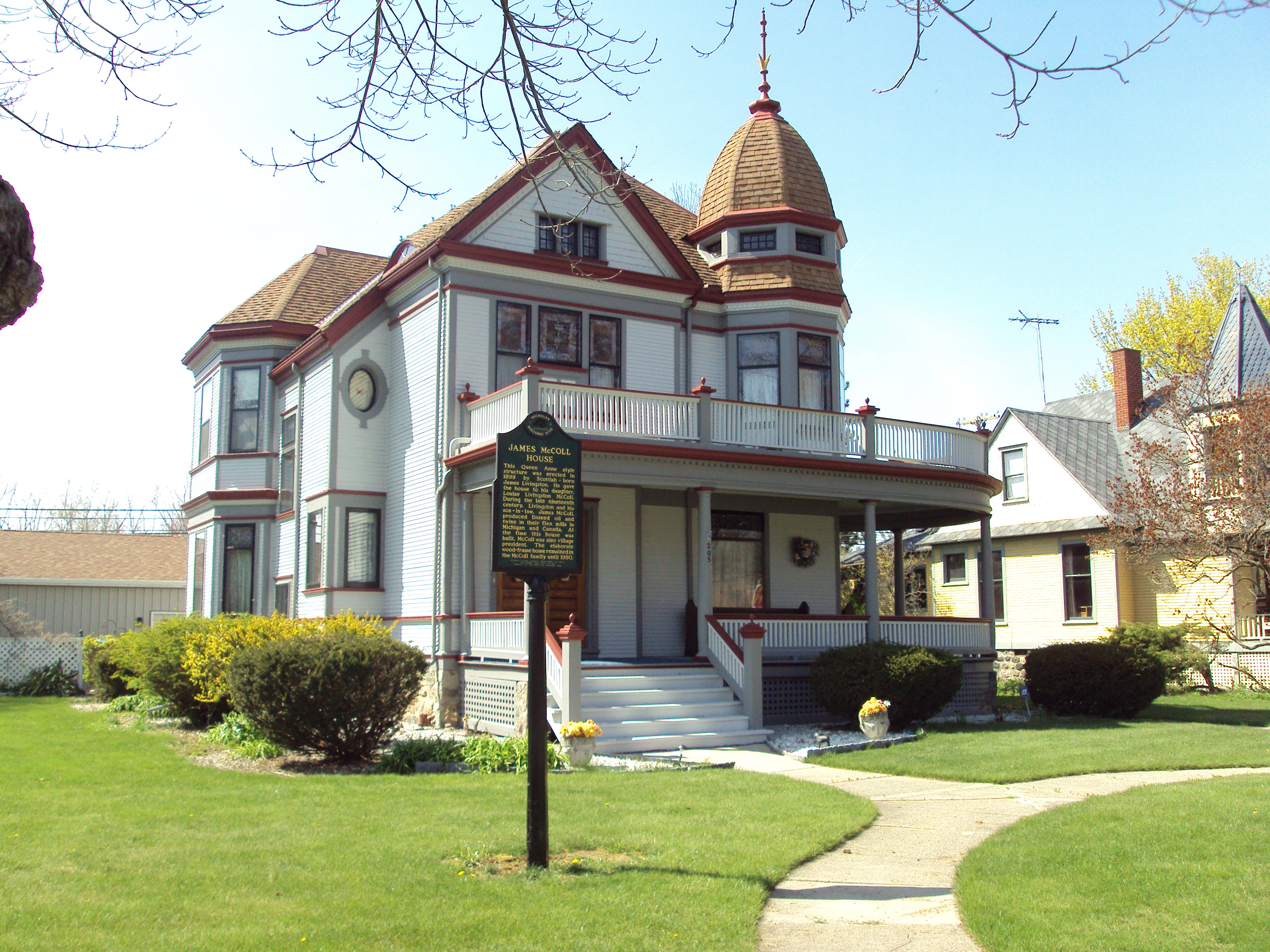

- Location within Michigan Location within the United States
- Interactive map
- Location: 205 S. Main St., Yale, Michigan
- Coordinates: 43°7′36″N 82°47′55″W
- Area: less than one acre
- Built: 1899
- Architect: Isaac Erb
- Architectural style: Queen Anne
- NRHP reference No.: 85000170
- Added to NRHP: January 31, 1985

The James McColl House is a private house located at 205 S. Main Street in Yale, Michigan. It was listed on the National Register of Historic Places in 1985.

== History ==
James Livingston owned a thriving flax industry, centered in Baden, Ontario, in the latter half of the 19th century. By the early 1880s, Livingston's flax empire had spread to Michigan's thumb area, where he partnered with James McColl. The two owned multiple plants in the area, and eventually spread out into banking.

In 1889, McColl married James Livingston's daughter, Louise. The McColls were involved in many affairs of the village, and James McColl served as president of the Village of Yale from 1894 to 1901. In 1899, James Livingston hired architect Isaac Erb to design this home for the McColls. The couple had three children, two of whom died young. The third, Elizabeth McColl Wight, went on to marry surgeon, Dr. F.B. Wight of Detroit. James and Louise McColl lived in this house until their deaths, after which ownership passed to their daughter Elizabeth. She owned the house until 1980.

Shortly after, the house was purchased by James Godo, who lived in this house until 1986. In 1986, this house was purchased by Linda and Stanley Morency. They lived in this house with their children, until both children moved out to start their own families. In 2016, Linda had died, and shortly after in 2017, Stanley has died as well. Ownership of this house passed down to their children, Melissa Varton and Kimberly Beymore. In 2019 the house was sold to Mark & Ariel Somo. They have fully remodeled and restored the home.

== Description ==
The James McColl House is a 2-1/2 story wood frame Queen Anne style house covered with clapboards. The main facade contains a number of double-hung windows and a large front porch supported by slender columns and featuring an upper balcony with railing. The porch shelters massive oak double-entry doors, recessed into the house.. The porch extends across the width of the facade and wraps around to one side. An octagonal projecting corner tower contains large double-hung windows with transoms, and is capped with a bell-shaped roof.

One side of the house has a large four-sided bay, located in the center of the facade and extending from to the roofline. The other side has a similar by, but round rather than four-sided. This bay is topped with a decorative metal frieze with a large dormer above. A small side entry and porch are also located on the side.

The interior contains a front parlor and back parlor both trimmed in "curly birch," with other rooms on the first floor trimmed with oak. These rooms include the entryway, a dining room, kitchen and pantry, and a second pantry now converted into a bathroom. Many of the rooms contain colored art glass windows. The upstairs contains four bedrooms.
