= Yale, Michigan =

- City
- City of Yale
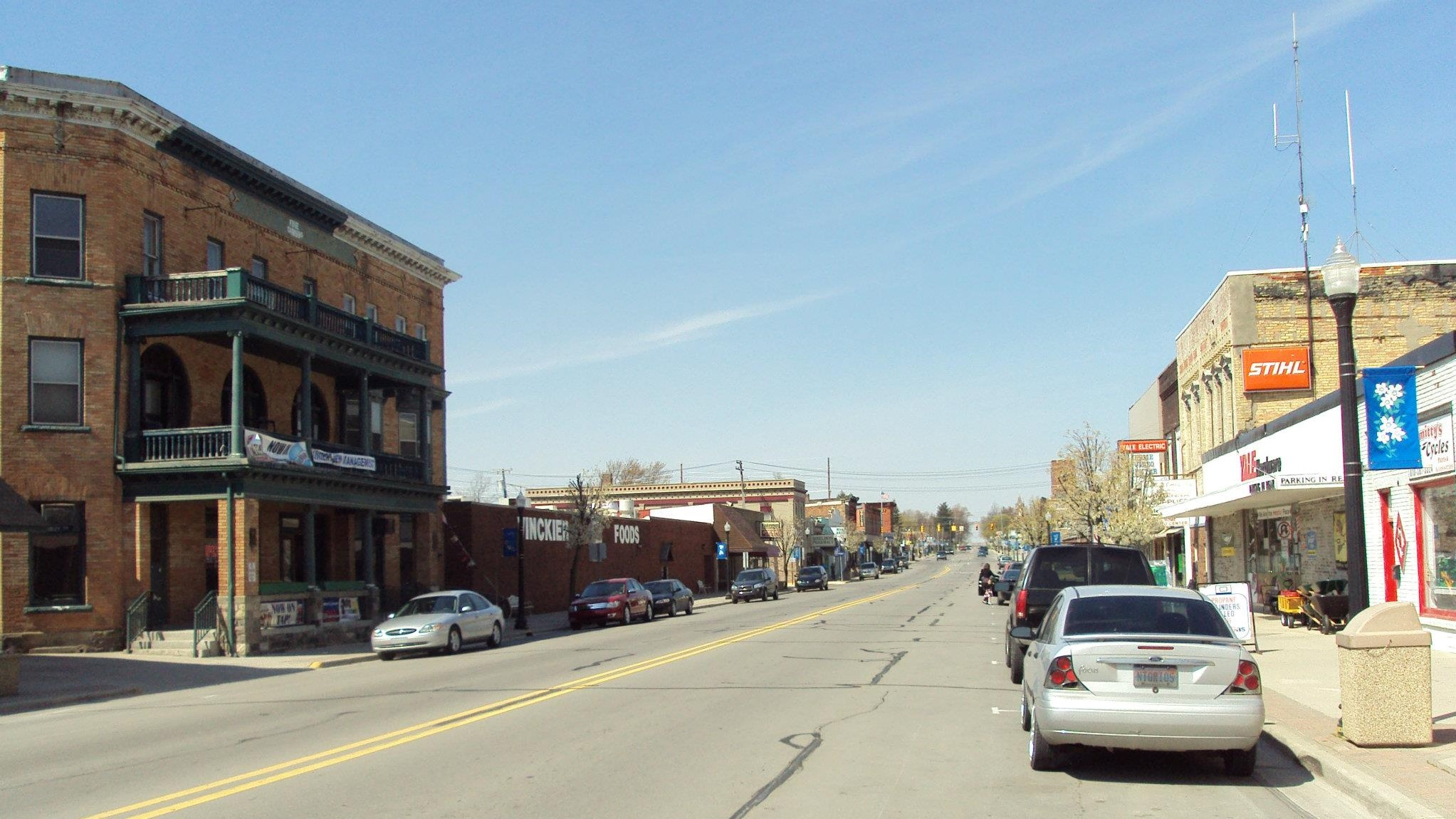
- Looking north along S. Main Street (M-19)

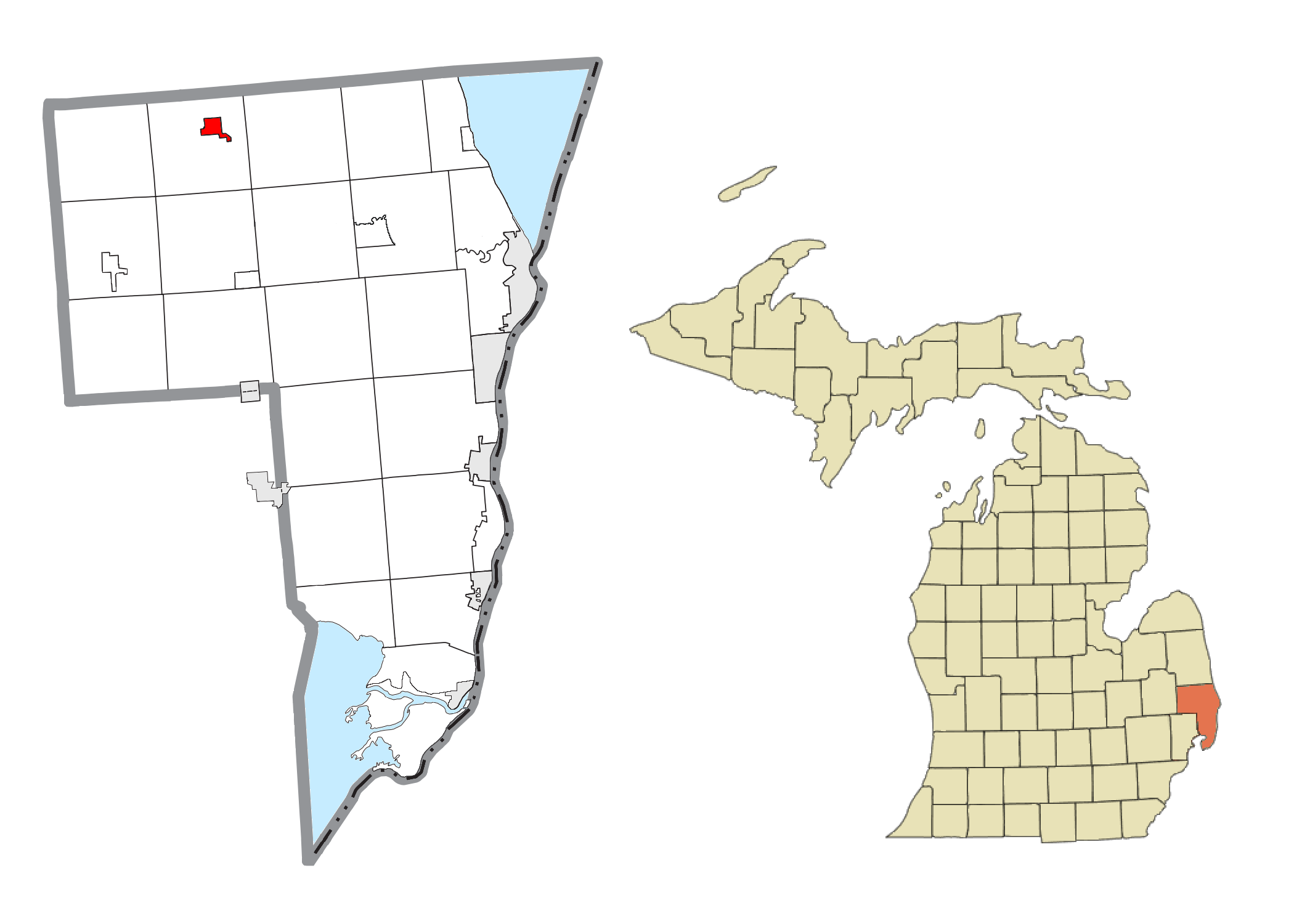
- Location within St. Clair County

- Location within the state of Michigan Location within the United States
- Coordinates: 43°07′49″N 82°47′52″W
- Country: United States
- State: Michigan
- County: St. Clair
- Settled: 1851
- Incorporated: 1895 (village); 1905 (city)

Government
  - Type: Council–manager
  - Mayor: Brenda Krzak
  - Clerk: Ashley Aldea
  - Manager: Lorrelei Natke

Area
  - Total: 1.38 sq mi (3.58 km^{2})
  - Land: 1.37 sq mi (3.56 km^{2})
  - Water: 0.0077 sq mi (0.02 km^{2})
- Elevation: 794 ft (242 m)

Population (2020)
  - Total: 1,903
  - Density: 1,389.05/sq mi (536.32/km^{2})
- Time zone: UTC-5 (Eastern (EST))
  - Summer (DST): UTC-4 (EDT)
- ZIP code(s): 48097
- Area code: 810
- FIPS code: 26-89000
- GNIS feature ID: 1625031
- Website: Official website

Yale is a city in St. Clair County in the U.S. state of Michigan. As of the 2020 census, Yale had a population of 1,903. Yale is considered unofficially as the Bologna Capital of the world, in part due to its Yale Bologna Festival, which began in 1989. Yale bologna is sold in grocery stores throughout the area. Yale is also home to the Yale Airport which is just south of town on Brockway Rd.

== History ==
Brockway Township received its first post office under the name Brockway Centre on May 11, 1865. The post office name was changed to Yale on June 24, 1889. Yale incorporated as a village in 1895. Yale incorporated as a city in 1905, becoming a separate municipality from Brockway Township. The James McColl House is located in Yale and listed on the National Register of Historic Places.

In 2007, the city's electors turned down the formation of a charter commission to write its own charter to replace the 4th Class City Charter.

== Geography ==
- According to the United States Census Bureau, the city has a total area of 1.39 square miles (3.60 km^{2}), of which 1.38 square miles (3.57 km^{2}) is land and 0.01 square miles (0.03 km^{2}) is water.
- It might be considered to be part of the Thumb of Michigan, which in turn is a subregion of the Flint/Tri-Cities.
  - Yale can also be considered as in the Blue Water Area.

== Demographics ==
Historical population
Census	Pop.	Note	%±
1890	937		—
1900	1,125		20.1%
1910	1,223		8.7%
1920	1,223		0.0%
1930	1,345		10.0%
1940	1,489		10.7%
1950	1,641		10.2%
1960	1,621		−1.2%
1970	1,505		−7.2%
1980	1,814		20.5%
1990	1,977		9.0%
2000	2,063		4.4%
2010	1,955		−5.2%
2020	1,903		−2.7%
U.S. Decennial Census

=== 2020 census ===
As of the 2020 census, Yale had a population of 1,903. The median age was 40.6 years. 23.6% of residents were under the age of 18 and 19.5% of residents were 65 years of age or older. For every 100 females there were 90.9 males, and for every 100 females age 18 and over there were 85.0 males age 18 and over.

0.0% of residents lived in urban areas, while 100.0% lived in rural areas.

There were 753 households in Yale, of which 31.2% had children under the age of 18 living in them. Of all households, 39.0% were married-couple households, 19.3% were households with a male householder and no spouse or partner present, and 32.7% were households with a female householder and no spouse or partner present. About 33.0% of all households were made up of individuals and 17.2% had someone living alone who was 65 years of age or older.

There were 827 housing units, of which 8.9% were vacant. The homeowner vacancy rate was 1.2% and the rental vacancy rate was 13.3%.

Racial composition as of the 2020 census
Race	Number	Percent
White	1,798	94.5%
Black or African American	1	0.1%
American Indian and Alaska Native	4	0.2%
Asian	9	0.5%
Native Hawaiian and Other Pacific Islander	0	0.0%
Some other race	4	0.2%
Two or more races	87	4.6%
Hispanic or Latino (of any race)	42	2.2%

=== 2010 census ===
As of the census of 2010, there were 1,955 people, 722 households, and 459 families residing in the city. The population density was 1,416.7 inhabitants per square mile (547.0/km^{2}). There were 859 housing units at an average density of 622.5 per square mile (240.3/km^{2}). The racial makeup of the city was 96.8% White, 0.6% African American, 0.1% Native American, 0.1% Asian, 0.9% from other races, and 1.6% from two or more races. Hispanic or Latino of any race were 1.3% of the population.

There were 722 households, of which 36.7% had children under the age of 18 living with them, 44.9% were married couples living together, 11.6% had a female householder with no husband present, 7.1% had a male householder with no wife present, and 36.4% were non-families. 30.2% of all households were made up of individuals, and 16% had someone living alone who was 65 years of age or older. The average household size was 2.56 and the average family size was 3.23.

The median age in the city was 38.2 years. 27% of residents were under the age of 18; 8.3% were between the ages of 18 and 24; 24.2% were from 25 to 44; 23.2% were from 45 to 64; and 17.3% were 65 years of age or older. The gender makeup of the city was 45.6% male and 54.4% female.

=== 2000 census ===
As of the census of 2000, there were 2,063 people, 742 households, and 494 families residing in the city. The population density was 1,599.2 inhabitants per square mile (617.5/km^{2}). There were 805 housing units at an average density of 624.0 per square mile (240.9/km^{2}). The racial makeup of the city was 97.67% White, 0.15% African American, 0.58% Native American, 0.05% Pacific Islander, 0.63% from other races, and 0.92% from two or more races. Hispanic or Latino of any race were 1.41% of the population.

There were 742 households, out of which 39.1% had children under the age of 18 living with them, 48.9% were married couples living together, 12.9% had a female householder with no husband present, and 33.4% were non-families. 30.2% of all households were made up of individuals, and 16.2% had someone living alone who was 65 years of age or older. The average household size was 2.63 and the average family size was 3.29.

In the city, the population was spread out, with 29.6% under the age of 18, 8.8% from 18 to 24, 27.6% from 25 to 44, 17.1% from 45 to 64, and 16.9% who were 65 years of age or older. The median age was 33 years. For every 100 females, there were 86.4 males. For every 100 females age 18 and over, there were 83.0 males.

The median income for a household in the city was $38,375, and the median income for a family was $45,450. Males had a median income of $37,241 versus $23,654 for females. The per capita income for the city was $17,054. About 4.7% of families and 6.1% of the population were below the poverty line, including 6.6% of those under age 18 and 6.7% of those age 65 or over.

== Climate ==
This climatic region is typified by large seasonal temperature differences, with warm to hot (and often humid) summers and cold (sometimes severely cold) winters. According to the Köppen Climate Classification system, Yale has a humid continental climate, abbreviated "Dfb" on climate maps.

== Education ==
Yale Public Schools

Located in the Western area of St. Clair County, approximately one hour North of Detroit. Yale Public Schools serves Avoca, Brockway, Emmett, Fargo, Goodells, Ruby, Yale and encompasses over 150 square miles in and surrounding these rural communities. There are five (5) buildings, housing approximately 1,900 students; Yale Elementary (K-5), John Farrell Emmett Elementary (K-5), Avoca Elementary (K-5), Yale Junior High School (6–8), and Yale High School (9–12). The District employees approximately 105 teachers and over 115 support personnel making it the largest employer in the area.

== Government ==
Yale city is governed under the 4th Class City charter, original written in 1895 as the Fourth Class City Act then recognized as the cities' charter in 1976.

== Notable people ==
- Anne Campbell, poet
