= Yale Airport =

Public use airport in Yale, Michigan

- IATA: none; ICAO: none; FAA LID: D20

Summary
- Airport type: Public
- Owner: Jerry L. Norris
- Serves: Yale, Michigan
- Time zone: UTC−05:00 (-5)
  - Summer (DST): UTC−04:00 (-4)
- Elevation AMSL: 814 ft / 248 m
- Coordinates: 43°06′45″N 082°47′15″W

Map

Runways
Direction	Length		Surface
Direction	ft	m	Surface
9/27	2,300	701	Turf

Statistics (2021)
- Aircraft operations: 50
- Source: Federal Aviation Administration

Yale Airport (FAA LID: D20) is a public-use airport located one nautical mile (1.85 km) southeast of the central business district of Yale, a city in St. Clair County, Michigan, United States.

== Facilities and aircraft ==
Yale Airport covers an area of 15 acres (6.1 ha) at an elevation of 814 feet (248 m) above mean sea level. It has one runway designated 9/27 with a turf surface measuring 2,300 by 110 feet (701 x 34 m).

For the 12-month period ending December 31, 2021, the airport had 50 general aviation aircraft operations. That is down from 200 operations in 2009. In 2021, one aircraft was based at the airport, a single-engine airplane.

The airport does not have a fixed-base operator.

== See also ==
- List of airports in Michigan
