= United Order of Tents =

African American secret society for women

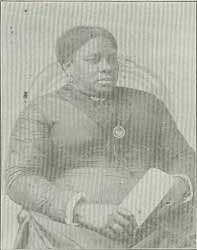
Annetta M. Lane

The United Order of Tents is an organization for African-American churchwomen founded in Norfolk, Virginia, in 1867 by Annetta M. Lane (c. 1838–1908) and Harriet R. Taylor. There are chapters across the United States. It is a secret society, with parts of membership and organizing only shared with members. It is the oldest benefit society for black women in the United States. At its height, national membership reached approximately 50,000 women.

== About ==
The United Order of Tents works to care for the sick and the elderly, to help those in need and to bury the dead. Historically, the group also helped provide loans to members when banks refused to give them loans. The Tents also helped provide shelter, food and healthcare to people in their communities.

The organization has rituals and customs that it keeps secret and only imparts to members of the Tents. Some women, in honor of their above-average service through the organization, are named Queens. All women also call each other Sister.

== History ==
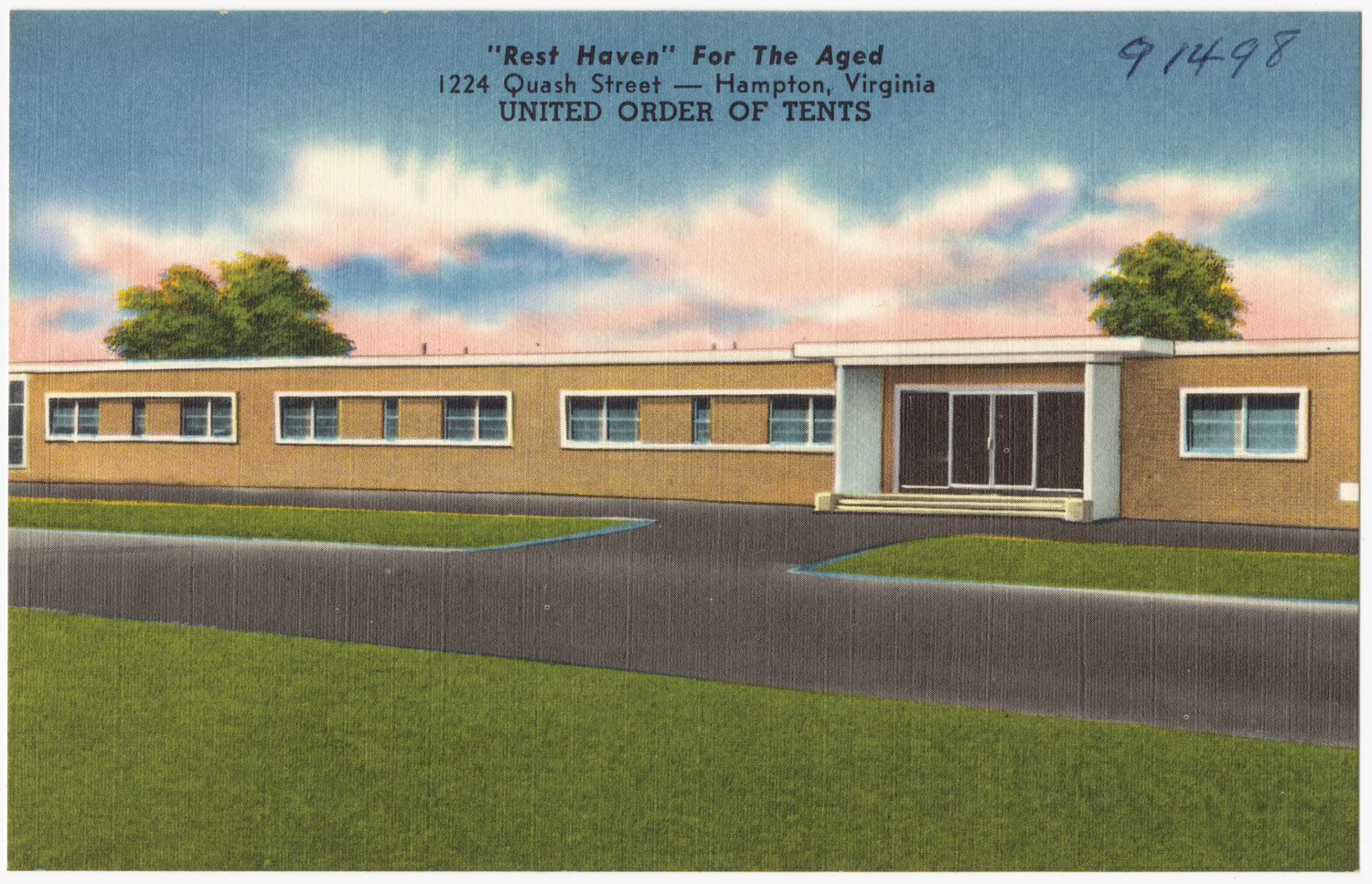
Rest Haven, a home for the elderly in Hampton, Virginia. The home was run by the United Order of Tents.

Annetta M. Lane, an enslaved woman, who was also a nurse on the plantation she worked on, and Harriet R. Taylor founded the organization in Virginia in 1867 with help from two abolitionists, Joliffe Union and Joshua R. Giddings. The organization was created as a fraternal lodge intended to be used as a stop on the underground railroad. The name refers to the tents that fugitive slaves often used as shelter.

They wished to create a Christian group dedicated to helping members of the community. Lane and Taylor officially incorporated the organization under the names of Giddings and Union, and it became the first benevolent organization for women officially chartered in Virginia after the Civil War. In 1888, the Grand National Tent was headquartered in Wilmington, Delaware. Meetings were also hosted yearly in various locations of the country.

Annetta Lane was instrumental in leading and creating the Southern District for the United Order of Tents. Following Lane's death in 1908, leadership of the organization passed to her daughter, Sallie Lane Bonney. Under Bonney, membership in the United Order of Tents expanded to new states and more than tripled.

The Tents established a home for the elderly in 1894 that ran continuously and funded only by members until 2002. In 1995 an apartment complex in Norfolk, Virginia was named "The Annetta M. Lane Apartments" in her honor.

== Eastern District No. 3 ==
United Order of Tents Eastern District No. 3 has headquarters in the Bedford-Stuyvesant neighborhood of Brooklyn, New York. Founding members of the chapter were formerly enslaved women. The chapter is the only remaining one in the Eastern District, which includes the states from Pennsylvania to Maine.

The group's headquarters building at 87 MacDonough Street was originally built in 1863 for a brewer named William A. Parker, then owned by James McMahon, the president of Emigrant Industrial Savings Bank. The Tents purchased it in 1945. At that time Bedford-Stuyvesant was "a major cultural center for Black New Yorkers", according to the New York Times.

== Notable members ==
- Eliza Allen, activist, clubwoman, and banker
