= Heidi Thomson =

New Zealand English academic

- Born: 1961 (age 64–65)
- Other name: Heide-Marie Clara Achiel Van de Veire
- Education: University of Illinois at Urbana-Champaign
- Scientific career
- Workplaces: Victoria University of Wellington
- Thesis: The poetic self in the English ode, 1740–1820 (1990)
- Doctoral advisor: Jack Stillinger

Heidi Thomson (born 1961) is a New Zealand academic, a full professor of English at the Victoria University of Wellington.

== Academic career ==
After an undergraduate at the University of Ghent and a 1990 PhD titled 'The poetic self in the English ode, 1740–1820' at the University of Illinois at Urbana-Champaign, Thomson moved to Victoria University of Wellington, rising to full professor.

== Selected works ==
- Fauske, Heidi Kaufman Christopher J. An uncomfortable authority: Maria Edgeworth and her contexts. University of Delaware Press, 2004.
- Thomson, Heidi. "We are two": The address to Dorothy in" Tintern Abbey." Studies in Romanticism 40, no. 4 (2001): 531–546.
- Dabundo, Laura. Encyclopedia of Romanticism (Routledge Revivals): Culture in Britain, 1780s–1830s. Routledge, 2009.
- Bloom, Abigail Burnham, ed. Nineteenth-century British women writers: a bio-bibliographical critical sourcebook. Greenwood Publishing Group, 2000.
- Thomson, Heidi. "Eavesdropping on" The Eve of St. Agnes": Madeline's Sensual Ear and Porphyro's Ancient Ditty." The Journal of English and Germanic Philology 97, no. 3 (1998): 337–351.
- Thomson, Heidi. "The Poet and the Publisher in Thomas Gray's Correspondence." The Yearbook of English Studies 28 (1998): 163–180.
- Heidi Thomson, Coleridge and the Romantic Newspaper: The "Morning Post" and the Road to "Dejection" (Basingstoke: Palgrave Macmillan, 2016)
