= Adolphus Humbles =

Merchant and toll road operator

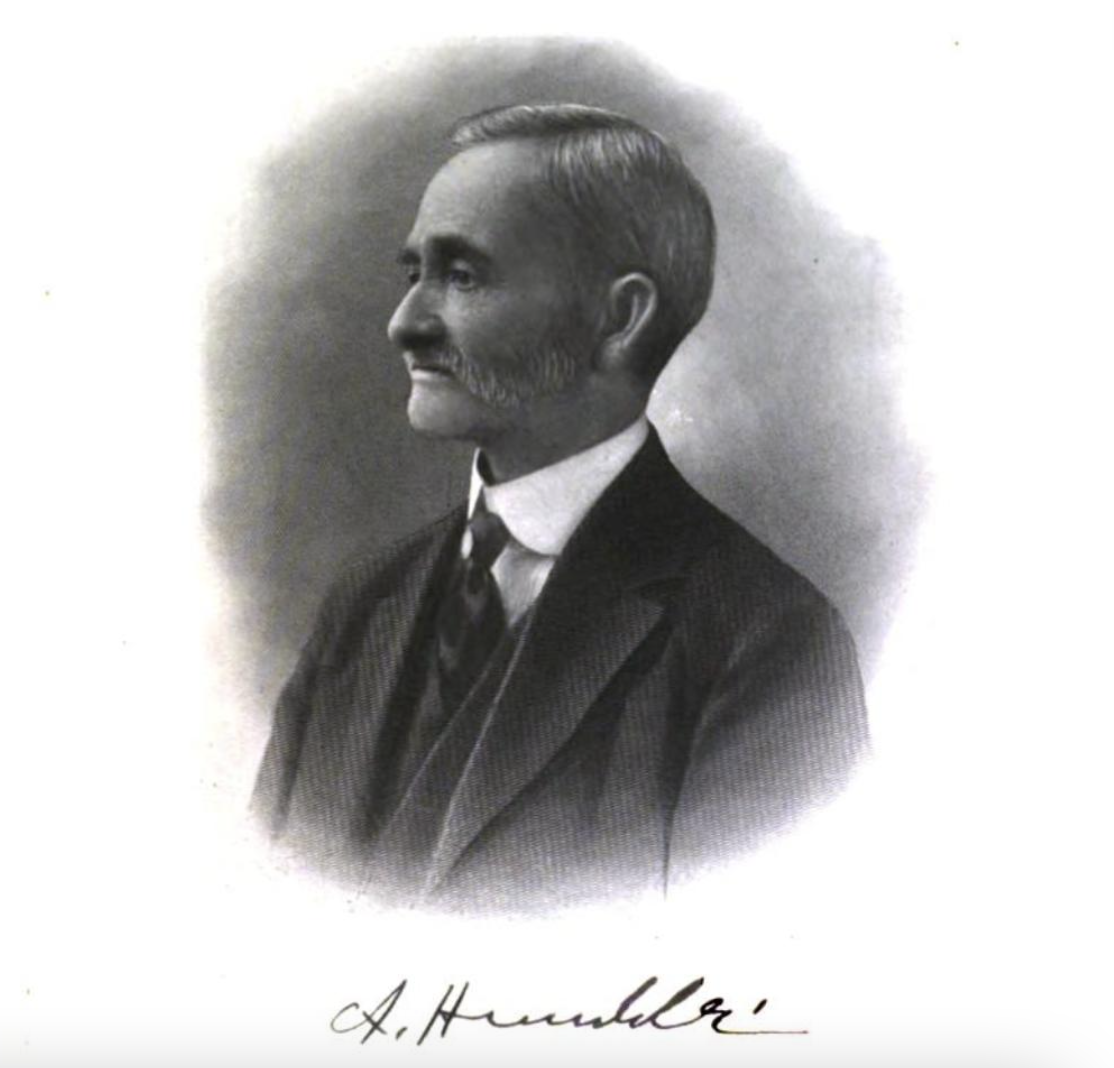
Adolphus Humbles

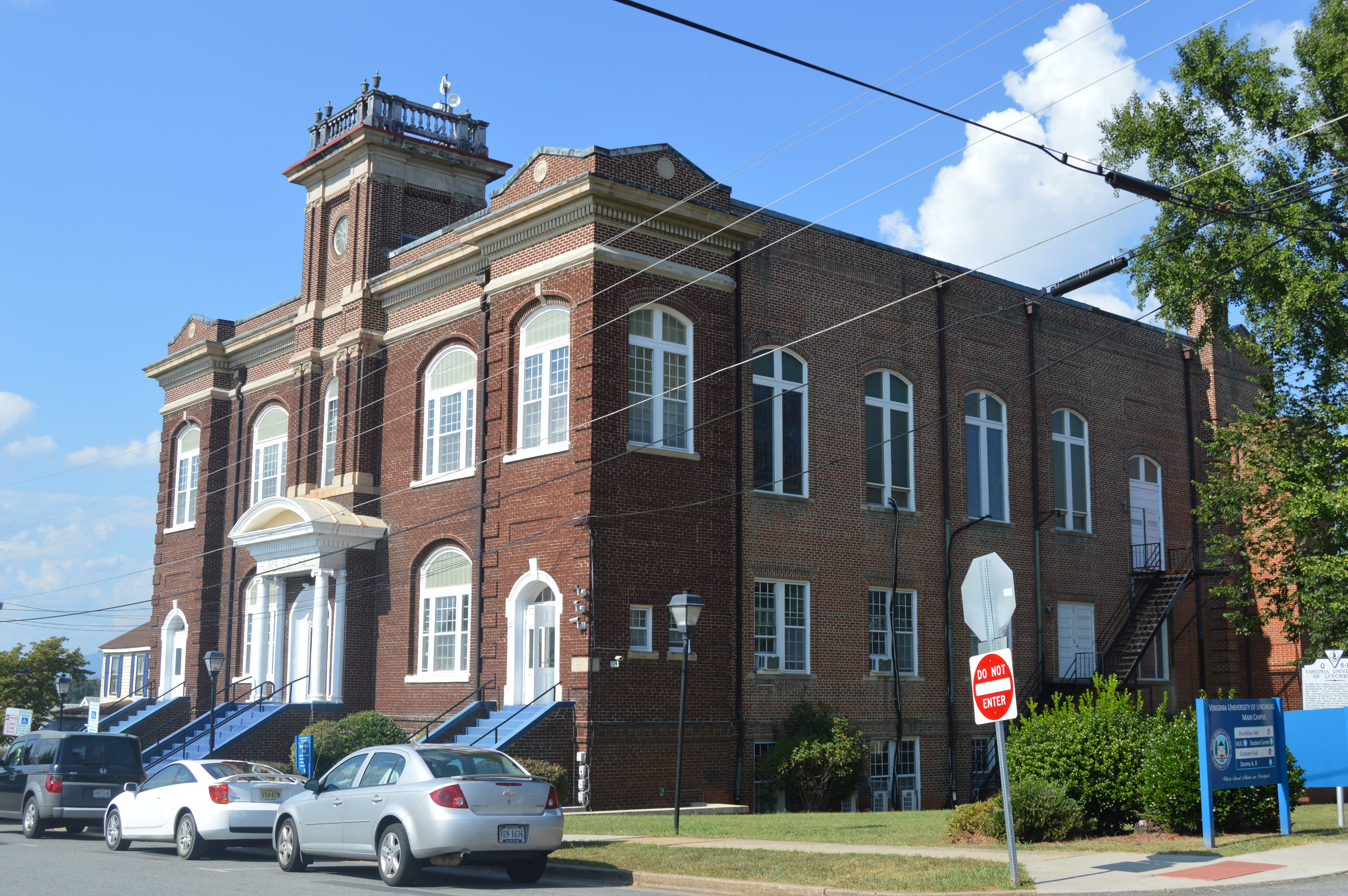
Humbles Hall at Virginia University of Lynchburg

Adolphus Humbles (1845–1926) was a merchant, toll road operator, and an early supporter of the Virginia Theological Seminary in Lynchburg, Virginia (a precursor to Virginia University of Lynchburg). The University's main building, Humbles Hall, is named for him. He was African American.

== Biography ==
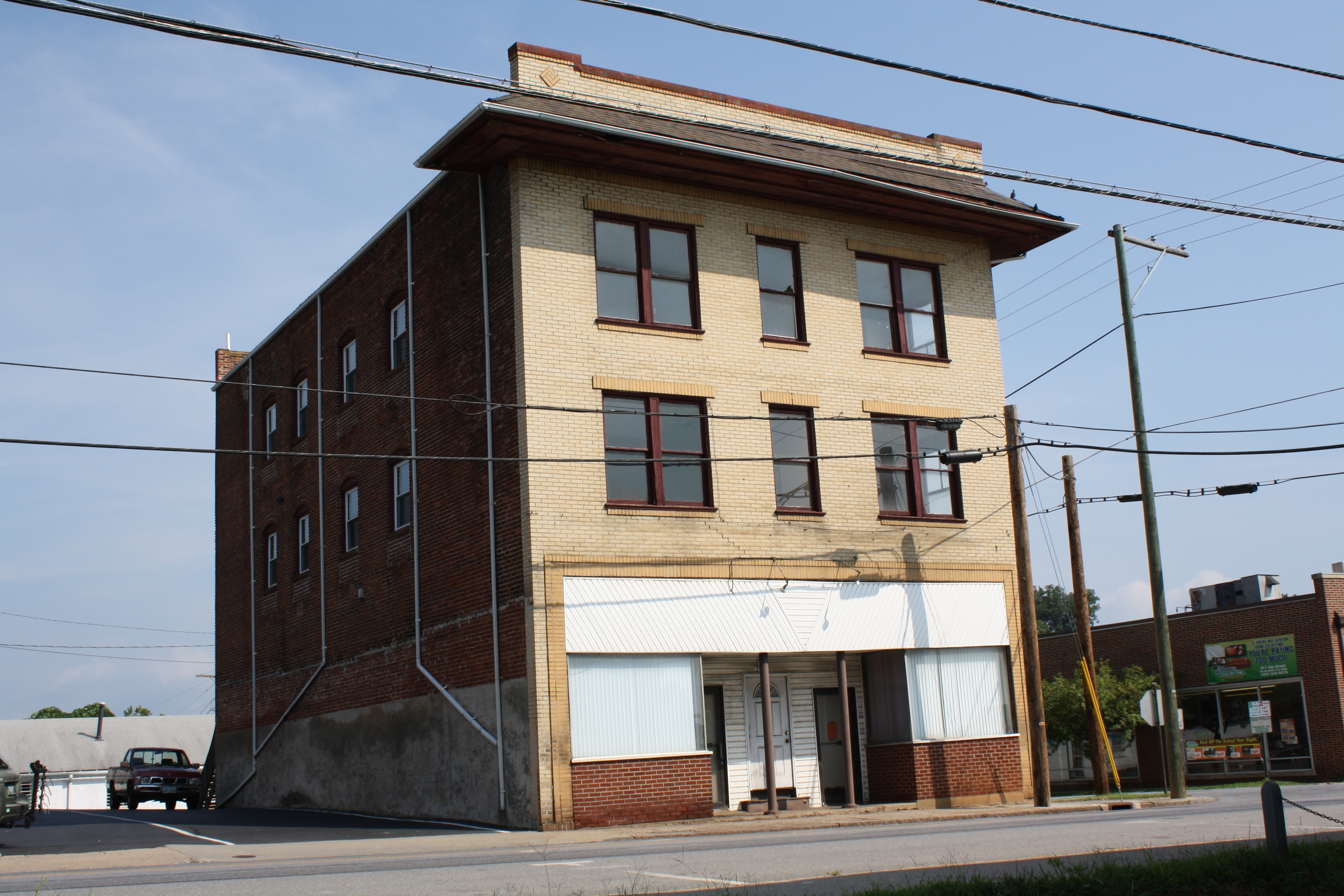
Humbles Building in 2011 at 901 5th Street in Lynchburg, part of the Fifth Street Historic District

Humbles was a successful merchant in Campbell County and operated the toll road between Lynchburg and Rustburg (the seat of Campbell County). He served as the Treasurer of both the Virginia State Baptist Convention and the Virginia Theological Seminary and College (now known as Virginia University of Lynchburg), where the school’s main building bears his name. Also active in politics, he served as Chairman of the Campbell County Executive Committee for the Republican Party for thirteen years.

Humbles built what is known as the Humbles Building at 901 Fifth Street in what is now known as the Fifth Street Historic District.

Humbles's adopted daughter, a white woman, was denied her inheritance of his estate because her adopted parents were in an interracial marriage, which was not recognized in Virginia at that time.

Humbles was on the board of the True Reformers.

== See also ==
- Pierce Street Historic District
