= Anne Campbell (poet) =

American poet

- Born: June 19, 1888
- Died: January 16, 1984 (aged 95)
- Spouse: George Washington Stark
- Children: 3
- Writing career
- Genre: Poetry

Anne Campbell (June 19, 1888 – January 16, 1984) was an American newspaper poet. She wrote a poem a day, six days a week, for at least 25 years for the Detroit News.

== Early life and education ==
Campell was born June 19, 1888 on a farm near Yale, Michigan, to High J. and Mina Campbell. According to Stanford's Mike Chasar, she possibly finished high school. She published her first poem at the age of 10, in the Detroit Free Press. When she was 14 she won a statewide award for a story and poem, and she sold her first poem when she was 17.

== Career ==
Campbell worked as a women's page editor for The Gleaner, a monthly newspaper published by the Gleaner Life Insurance Society, until 1918.

The Detroit News hired Campbell in 1922 in response to the popularity of Edgar Guest, who at the time was writing a daily poem for the Detroit Free Press. She wrote a poem a day, six days a week, for at least 25 years.

By the 1930s Campell was doing readings during intermissions of the Minneapolis Symphony Orchestra and on radio and television. She gave talks on "Everyday Poetry" on the Lyceum circuit.

By 1947 her work was syndicated in 30 newspapers in the US, Canada, and Great Britain, and she was earning $10,000 per year. According to Time, as of 1947 she was receiving 100 fan letters a week.

In 1953 she was awarded an honorary degree by Wayne State University.

Campbell published multiple books of poetry. Her work is included in Literary Michigan by The Michigan Council for the Humanities (1988), Michigan Authors (1980), and Michigan Poets (1964).

== Personal life ==
Campbell married George Washington Stark, a columnist and editor for the Detroit News who later became the city historian, in 1915 when she was 27. The couple had three children.

Campbell died January 16, 1984 at age 95.
