= Victorian Periodicals Review =

- Discipline: Victorian era, literature, history
- Language: English
- Edited by: Janice Schroeder, Carleton University

Publication details
- Former name: Victorian Periodical Newsletter
- History: 1972-present
- Publisher: Johns Hopkins University Press (United States)
- Frequency: Semiannually

Standard abbreviations
- ISO 4: Vic. Period. Rev.

Indexing
- ISSN: 0709-4698 (print); 1712-526X (web)
- JSTOR: 07094698
- OCLC no.: 5339718

Links
- Journal homepage; Online access

The Victorian Periodicals Review is a peer-reviewed academic journal established in 1968, under the editorship of Michael Wolff and Dorothy Deering, as the Victorian Periodical Newsletter. It obtained its current name in 1979. The journal covers the editorial and publishing history of periodicals from the Victorian era. Authors are invited to submit an op-ed style paper which addresses a topic of current interest. The journal is published semiannually by the Johns Hopkins University Press.
