= Anne Campbell (conductor) =

- Born: January 16, 1912
- Origin: Canada
- Died: April 13, 2011 (aged 99)
- Occupation: Choir conductor

Anne Adamson Campbell (January 16, 1912 – April 13, 2011) was a Canadian choir conductor.

== Early life ==
Campbell was born as Anne Adamson Cowie in Sutherland, Saskatchewan.

== Education ==
Campbell studied piano with Lyell Gustin and voice in Saskatoon. Campbell went on to study with Ernesto Vinci at the Banff School of Fine Arts and with Filmer Hubble. She earned the designation of Associate of the Toronto Conservatory of Music (ATCM) for piano in 1930 and for voice in 1934. She received a Licentiate in Music (L. Mus.) in 1932.

== Career ==
In 1953, Campbell formed the Southminster Junior Girls Choir in Lethbridge; this was followed by the formation of the Teen Clefs in 1963, who won the George S. Mathieson Trophy in 1968 and the Anne Campbell Singers in 1968 who won the same trophy in 1970. The latter group performed at Expo 67 and Expo '70 and toured Europe, winning first prize at two international competitions. All three groups have produced a number of recordings.

In 1976, Campbell was named to the Order of Canada.

== Personal life ==
Campbell died in Cochrane, Alberta at the age of 99.
