= Grand United Order of True Reformers =

African-American fraternal organization

- Founded: 1873; 153 years ago Alabama and Kentucky
- Type: General fraternity and benefit society
- Former affiliation: Independent Order of Good Templars
- Status: Defunct
- Successor: Grand Fountain of the United Order of True Reformers
- Emphasis: African Americans
- Scope: National
- Headquarters: Richmond, Virginia; United States

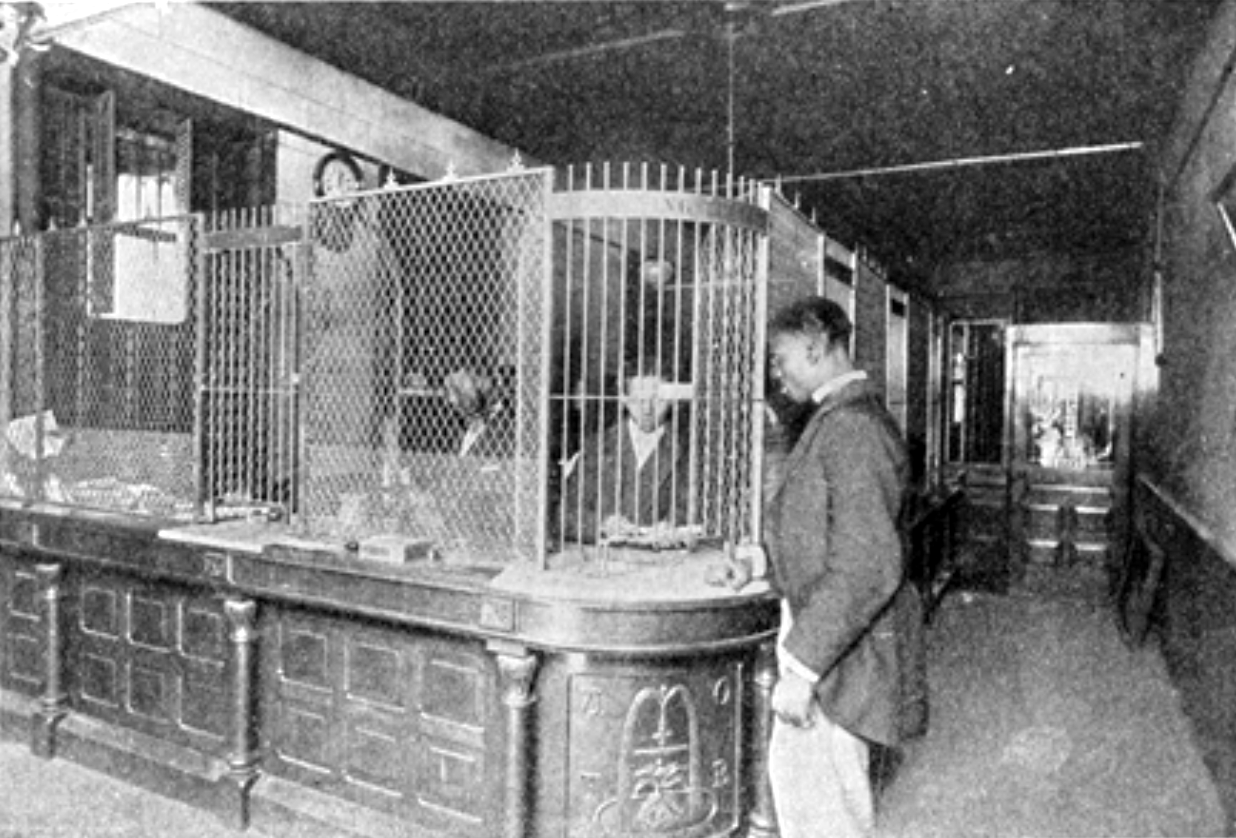
The banking room (1895) in the Savings Bank of the Grand Fountain

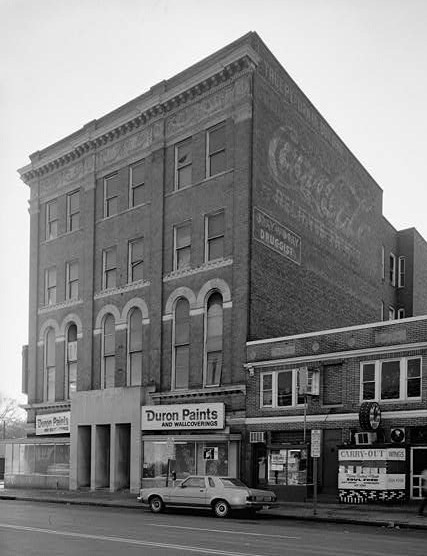
True Reformer Building, 1200 U Street Northwest in Washington, District of Columbia, D.C.

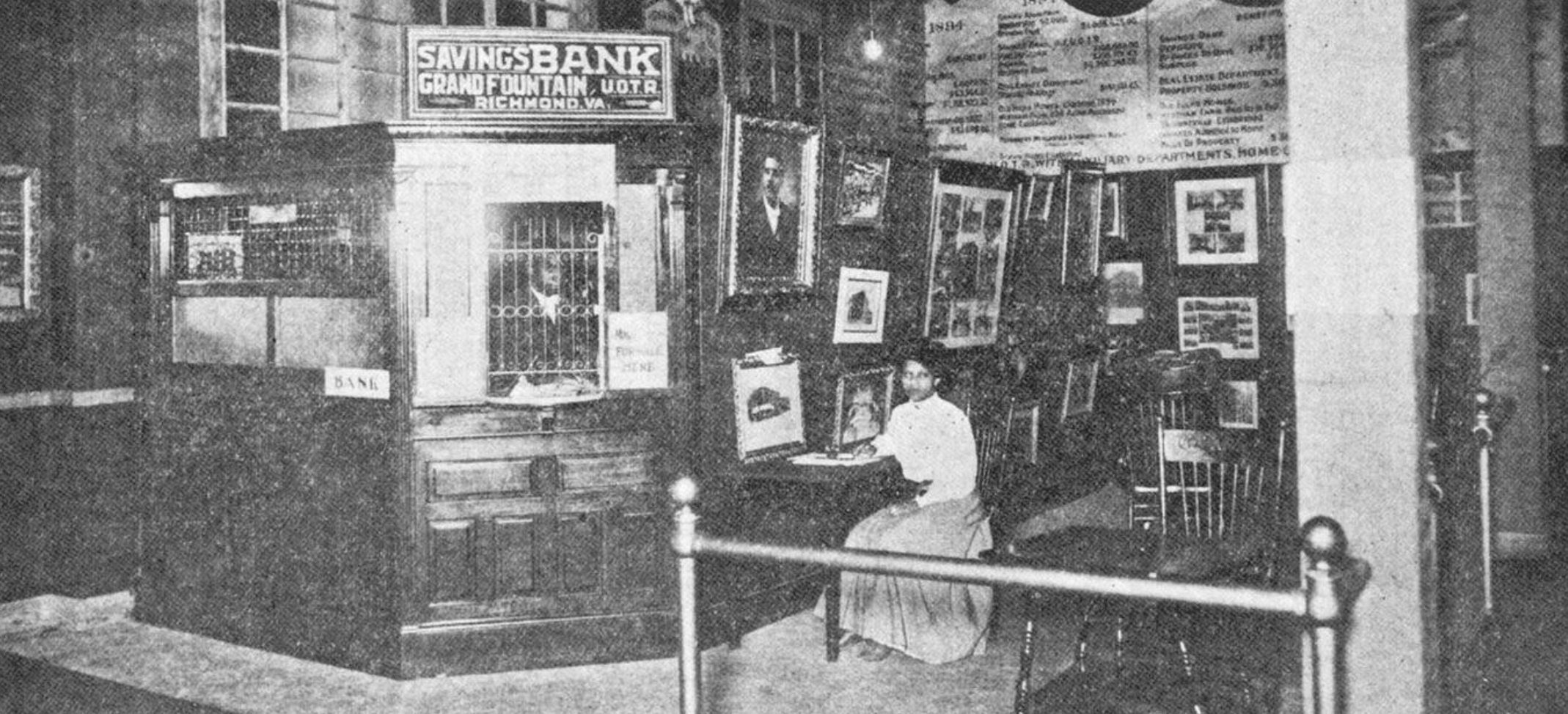
A working branch of The True Reformers Savings Bank within the Negro Building at the 1907 Jamestown Exposition

Grand United Order of True Reformers was an African-American fraternal organization founded in 1873 in Alabama and Kentucky. Originally managed by deputies of the all-white, pro-temperance organization, the Independent Order of Good Templars, the Grand Fountain of the United Order of True Reformers, or the True Reformers, was re-organized c. 1875 by William Washington Browne in Richmond, Virginia. This organization existed as a business and a mutual-aid society during the era of Jim Crow segregation laws, and it supported the growing African-American middle class through economic opportunities and education, before its closure in 1934.

== History ==
=== Grand United Order of True Reformers (1873–1880s) ===
The Grand United Order of True Reformers began in 1873 in Alabama and Kentucky. It existed as an African American organization led by the all-White organization of the Independent Order of Good Templars. The organization was active in the temperance movement, and provided their members with sick and death benefits.

William "Ben" Washington Browne was born in 1849 as a Black man into bondage on the Georgia plantation owned by Benjamin Pryor in Habersham County. He eventually escaped his enslavers during the American Civil War and joined the Union Army, followed by a discharge from service in 1862. Browne attended school in Wisconsin and became an ordained Methodist minister. For some time he taught and led church ministry in the south. He was an outspoken proponent of the temperance movement as a way to but his vision went beyond temperance. He wanted to create an–African American economy of goods and services, independent of government assistance. Browne urged the formation of "fountains" to pool money and buy land.

Browne attempted to apply for formal membership to the Good Templars but was denied. However, the Good Templars agreed to foster the separate affiliated all-black group called the United Order of True Reformers.

Around 1875, Browne was invited by the True Reformers to spearhead a new branch of the movement in Richmond, Virginia.

=== Grand Fountain of the United Order of True Reformers (1875–1934) ===
The Grand Fountain of the United Order of True Reformers was founded by William Washington Browne c. 1875 in Richmond, Virginia as an African-American fraternal organization. Browne created the organization to revive the Grand United Order of True Reformers, which had become less active.

When interest in the fraternal organization began to decrease, Browne began shifting from a temperance society to an insurance organization, a movement that required Browne to move to the city of Richmond in 1880. Eliza Allen joined the Grand Fountain of the United Order of True Reformers in 1880. She organized one of the first fountains in Virginia. In 1881 The True Reformers held their first convention and elected Allen as their grand worthy governess.

The Grand Fountain of the United Order of True Reformers expanded to support a growing African American middle class and offered business services including a bank and a real estate company. It owned several properties and ran a newspaper entitled the Reformer. The organization owned a retirement home, and had a children's division. At one point in time was the largest black fraternal society and black-owned business in the United States. It reached the 70,000 members by 1900, and by that time had also contributed US$2 million in benefits and relief.

Browne managed the organization up until 1898, whereupon William Lee Taylor, formerly enslaved in Caroline County, Virginia, and freed after the Civil War to become a Baptist minister, became the official leader.

=== True Reformers Savings Bank ===
In 1889, The True Reformers Savings Bank opened. It was the first Black-owned bank in the United States to receive a bank charter. Giles Beecher Jackson of Richmond, Virginia had helped found the bank affiliated with the True Reformers organization. At the bank's peak in 1907, it took in deposits of more than US$1 million. However, by 1910, the bank closed after an embezzlement scandal and several large loan defaults occurred.

The organization existed until 1934, however, it mostly collapsed after the closure of the bank. After the bank defaulted, the organization was not able to pay the outstanding insurance claims which caused the state of Virginia to revoke their insurance license.

== Notable members ==
- Eliza Allen (c. 1840–after 1910), first and only woman listed on the charter of The True Reformers Savings Bank
- James Blackwell (1864–1931), educator and businessperson, namesake of J.H. Blackwell Elementary School
- William Washington Browne (1849–1897), founder of the Grand Fountain of the United Order of True Reformers
- Mary E. Cary Burrell (1865–?), educator and businessperson
- William Patrick Burrell (1865–1952), secretary to Browne for the Grand Fountain of the United Order of True Reformers
- George W. Hayes (1847–1933), Ohio state legislator
- William Nauns Ricks (1876–1948), poet
- William Lee Taylor (1854–1915) Baptist minister, banker, farmer, and Grand Master of the Grand Fountain of the United Order of True Reformers

== See also ==
- List of African-American fraternities and sororities
- List of North American ethnic and religious fraternal orders
- List of Temperance organizations
- True Reformer Building
