= Chief Diversity, Equity, and Inclusion Officer of the Commonwealth of Virginia =

Office of the Virginia Governor's Cabinet

- Seal of the Commonwealth of Virginia

- Flag of Virginia
- Incumbent; Dr. Sesha Joi Moon; Acting since January 17, 2026
- Style: The Honorable
- Member of: Virginia Governor's Cabinet
- Nominator: Governor of Virginia
- Appointer: Governor of Virginia
- Term length: 4 years
- Formation: September 2019
- First holder: Dr. Janice Underwood
- Website: www.diversity.virginia.gov

The Chief Diversity, Equity, and Inclusion Officer for the Commonwealth of Virginia, or more commonly referred to as the Chief Diversity Officer, is a cabinet-level position within the Virginia Governor’s Cabinet responsible for directing the Office of Diversity, Equity, and Inclusion (ODEI). The role was established in 2019 by Governor Ralph Northam, making Virginia the first U.S. state to create a cabinet-level position dedicated to diversity, equity, and inclusion initiatives. The officeholder is appointed by and serves at the pleasure of the Governor of Virginia to advance inclusive excellence by cultivating a high-performing workforce across state government that reflects the diversity of people the office serves and ensuring that employees, residents, and visitors feel a sense of belonging in the Commonwealth of Virginia. In January 2026, the current Chief Diversity Officer, Dr. Sesha Joi Moon, was appointed by the 75th Governor of the Commonwealth of Virginia, Abigail Spanberger.

== Duties ==
Under the Code of Virginia § 2.2-435.12, the officeholder is charged with among other statutory duties: (i) developing a sustainable framework to promote inclusive practices across state government; (ii) implementing a measurable, strategic plan to address systemic inequities in state government practices; and (iii) facilitating methods to turn feedback and suggestions from state employees, external stakeholders, and community leaders into concrete equity policy.

== History ==
The position was created in 2019 by Governor Ralph Northam. In September 2019, Northam appointed Dr. Janice Underwood as Virginia’s inaugural Chief Diversity, Equity, and Inclusion Officer. The role was designated as a cabinet-level position, making the Commonwealth of Virginia the first state in the United States of America to have a cabinet position dedicated to diversity, equity, and inclusion. In 2020, the General Assembly passed legislation establishing it as a permanent cabinet-level gubernatorial appointment.

In January 2022, Governor Glenn Youngkin appointed Angela Sailor to lead the office and through Executive Order No. 10, changed the position title to Chief Diversity, Opportunity, and Inclusion Officer. In November 2022, Martin Brown succeeded Sailor in the role.

In December 2025, Governor-elect Abigail Spanberger appointed Dr. Sesha Joi Moon, the former Chief Diversity Officer of the U.S. House of Representatives during the 117th and 118th Congresses, as Virginia’s Chief Diversity Officer and Director of Diversity, Equity, and Inclusion.

== List of Chief Diversity Officers for the Commonwealth ==
Officeholder	Term	Appointing Governor
Dr. Janice Underwood	2019 - 2022	Ralph Northam
Angela Sailor	2022 - 2023	Glenn Youngkin
Martin D. Brown	2023 - 2026	Glenn Youngkin
Dr. Sesha Joi Moon	2026–Present	Abigail Spanberger
