= Anthony Binga Jr. =

American minister and educator (1843–1919)

The Reverend Anthony Binga Jr.
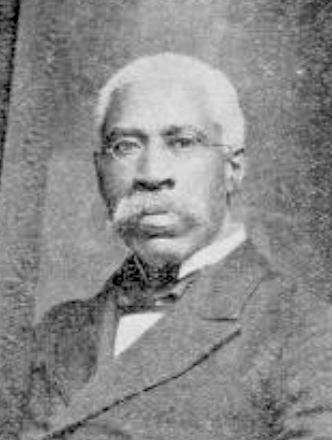
- Photograph of Rev. Anthony Binga Jr. published in 1908
- Born: June 1, 1843; Amherstburg, Ontario
- Died: January 21, 1919 (aged 75); Richmond, Virginia, U.S.
- Resting place: Mount Olivet Cemetery
- Education: King's Institute
- Occupations: Minister, educator, businessman
- Years active: 1865–1919
- Board member of: Baptist Foreign Mission Convention; Virginia Union University; Negro Development and Exposition Company
- Spouse(s): Rebecca L. Bush (m. 1869 d. 1907); Mary Sweetman (m. 1909)
- Children: 4
- Relatives: Lillian Atkins Clark (granddaughter); Jesse Binga (cousin)

Anthony Binga Jr. (June 1, 1843 – January 21, 1919) was an American minister, educator, businessman, and board chairman of the Baptist Foreign Mission Convention. He was one of the first African Americans to serve as a public school teacher in Virginia.

== Early life and education ==
Anthony Binga Jr. was born in Canada on June 1, 1843, the son of Rhoda Binga and Rev. Anthony Binga Sr., a Baptist preacher in Amherstburg, Ontario, founder of Amherstburg First Baptist Church, and conductor of the Underground Railroad. His parents had fled to Canada to escape slavery.

Binga was educated at King's Institute in Buxton. He originally had the goal of being a physician, and completed three years of medical training. Binga received private tutoring in Latin and anatomy and completed his studies in 1865. After a period of illness, Binga decided to become a minister and was ordained by the Canadian Anti-Slavery Baptist Association.

== Career ==
From 1865 to 1867, Binga was a school teacher in Atchison, Kansas. He then worked as a principal at Albany Enterprise Academy in Athens, Ohio, where he worked until 1869.

In 1872, Binga and his family relocated to Richmond, Virginia, where he had accepted a call as the minister of First Baptist Church. The same year, Binga began serving as an instructor to James Blackwell and John Mitchell Jr. In addition to his ministry, Binga accepted a position as a teacher in the Manchester public school system, where he was the first and only African American teacher. He oversaw the education of all African American students in Manchester, serving as the acting administrator of six schools. In his role, he advocated for the hiring of African American women as teachers, which was a central issue of the period.

Binga was highly active in the Virginia Baptist State Convention, serving as secretary of the organization in the 1870s. In 1880, he became the chairman of the Foreign Mission Board of the Baptist Foreign Mission Convention, an organization that is now known as the National Baptist Convention. Binga also served on the board of the Virginia auxiliary of the Lott Carey Baptist Foreign Mission Convention and as a trustee and vice chairman of Virginia Union University.

Outside of his education and ministry vocations, Binga was active in business and industry, including serving as vice president of the Negro Development and Exposition Company. The initial purpose of the company was to support an exhibit dedicated to African Americans in the "Negro Building" at the 1907 Jamestown Exposition.

Binga retired from teaching in 1888, but remained in his role as minister of First Baptist Church until his death. Binga oversaw the construction of the new First Baptist Church building which opened in 1892.

In 1905, Binga was a delegate to the Baptist Congress in London on behalf of the Lott Carey Convention.

== Personal life ==
In December 1869, Binga married Rebecca L. Bush. They had 3 children. After his wife's death in 1907, Binga remarried to Mary Sweetman in 1909. They had one son.

== Death ==
Binga died of arteriosclerosis on January 21, 1919, and is interred at Mount Olivet Cemetery.

== Works ==
- Sermons on Several Occasions (1889)
- Autobiography of Anthony Binga Jr. (1917)

== Awards and legacy ==
In 1889, Binga received an honorary Doctor of Divinity degree from Shaw University.

A collection of Binga's sermons is in the permanent collection of the New York Public Library.
