= Jackson Ward =

- Jackson Ward Historic District
- U.S. National Register of Historic Places
- U.S. National Historic Landmark District
- Virginia Landmarks Register
- Richmond City Historic District
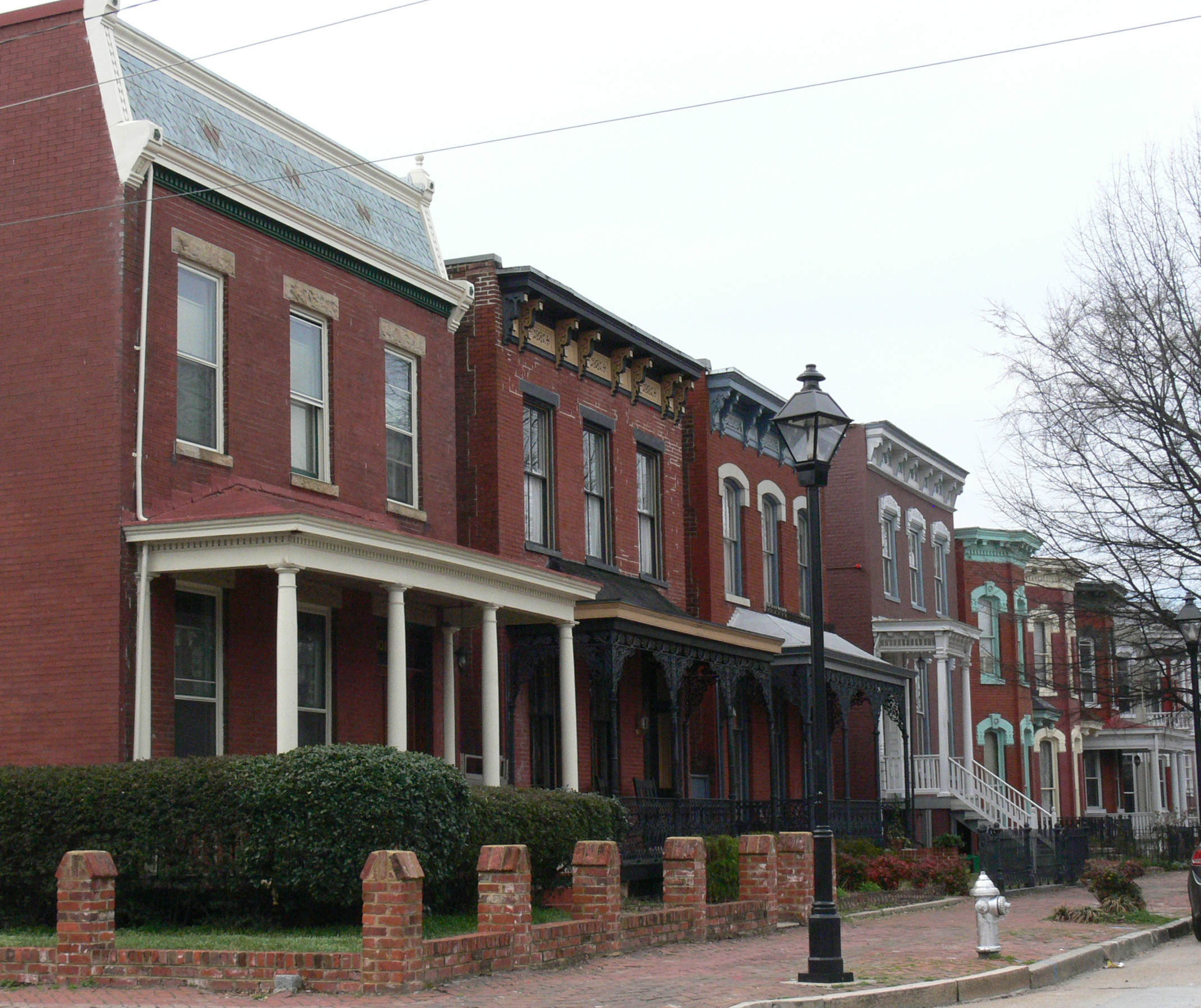

- Location within Virginia Location within the United States
- Location: Richmond, Virginia, U.S.
- Coordinates: 37°32′54″N 77°26′27″W
- Architect: Multiple
- Architectural style: Greek Revival, Italianate, Late Victorian
- NRHP reference No.: 76002187
- VLR No.: 127-0237

Significant dates
- Added to NRHP: July 30, 1976
- Designated NHLD: June 2, 1978
- Designated VLR: April 20, 1976; November 4, 2002; June 1, 2005; March 20, 2008

Jackson Ward, previously known as Central Wards, is a historically African-American district in Richmond, Virginia, with a long tradition of African-American businesses. It is located less than a mile from the Virginia State Capitol, sitting to the west of Court End and north of Broad Street. It was listed as a National Historic Landmark District in 1978. "Jackson Ward" was originally the name of the area's political district within the city, or ward, from 1871 to 1905, yet has remained in use long after losing its original meaning.

== History ==
=== Center of black commerce, entertainment and religion ===
in 1793, Abraham Peyton Skipwith built a three story cottage in the neighborhood, becoming the first free black homeowner and the “Founding Father of Jackson Ward.” After the American Civil War, more previously free black people joined freed slaves and their descendants and created a thriving African-American business community, became known as the "Black Wall Street of America." Leaders included such influential people as John Mitchell, Jr., editor of the Richmond Planet, an African American newspaper.

Maggie L. Walker was the first African-American woman in the United States to found a bank. The Maggie L. Walker National Historic Site at her former Jackson Ward home is operated by the National Park Service and the house was designated a National Historic Site in 1978 and opened as a museum in 1985.

Giles Beecher Jackson was the first African American to practice law before the Supreme Court of Virginia, he was active in the neighborhood and has a "Giles B. Jackson Day" on April 17 (starting in 2007) and a historic landmark in his honor at the intersection of North 2nd Street and East Clay Street.

As a center for both black commerce and entertainment, Jackson Ward was also called the "Harlem of the South". Venues along "The Deuce " (2nd Street) such as the Hippodrome Theater were frequented by Duke Ellington, Ella Fitzgerald, Bill "Bojangles" Robinson, Lena Horne, Cab Calloway, Billie Holiday, Nat King Cole, James Brown and other Chitlin' Circuit performers. A statue of Robinson dancing on a staircase is at the center of the neighborhood at the intersection of Chamberlayne Parkway and West Leigh Street.

Other notable residents included F. M. Whittle, Adolph Dill, James E. Jackson, William Lee Taylor, and Max and Randall Robinson.

=== Desegregation ===
Jackson Ward was central to the Civil Rights Movement in Richmond. In 1940, the Virginia General Assembly created the Richmond Housing Authority, which could condemn property as well as issue bonds to construct housing. In 1941, 1956 and 1961, the city (which initially had no African-Americans on the city council) hired Harland Bartholomew & Associates to plan for redevelopment. The redevelopment plans targeted Jackson Ward, and had the effect of severely disintegrating the historic community's social structure, as well as clustered low-income persons in Jackson Ward and nearby Church Hill, and destroyed much of the pre-existing housing stock in order to construct freeways, broad urban boulevards, office buildings, the Richmond Coliseum, the Greater Richmond Convention Center and a smaller number of housing units controlled by the Richmond Housing Authority.

The Richmond Housing Authority, initially controlled by the city's white business elite, first targeted the sub-neighborhood known as Apostle Town, adjacent to Maggie Walker's Penny Savings Bank. It built 297 units of public housing known as Gilpin Court to replace 200 houses. However, only 25 of 576 applicants for the new spaces (all segregated by race until 1964) had families who had lived in Apostle Town. During the 1950s, Richmond destroyed 4,700 units of housing in black neighborhoods and replaced them with 1,736 units of public housing, mostly concentrated in Richmond's East End and all within three miles of Richmond's center. While some displaced people received small grants, as well as priority in applying for housing in the new projects, many found the public housing demeaning or simply unattractive. Both black and white realtors practiced blockbusting. As urban renewal progressed, many historic black churches followed their congregations and moved from Jackson Ward to north Richmond. These included the First African Baptist Church and St. Philip's Episcopal Church. Both moved to churches formerly used by white congregations who had followed their congregations to suburban Lakeside. Between 1950 and 1960, Richmond's population decreased by 10,000 persons, while surrounding Henrico County (which had 57,340 people in 1950) grew to 117,339 residents by the 1960 census. Meanwhile, the Richmond housing authority built Creighton Court (1952), Fairfield Court (1958) and Whitcomb Court (1958), all in Richmond's East End.

In 1946 R. Stuart Royer and Associates, a consulting firm, proposed a turnpike that Richmond voters twice rejected in public referendums. However, the Virginia General Assembly (with no black members at the time) then created the Richmond–Petersburg Turnpike Authority in 1954, which four months later announced the highway would be built through Jackson Ward. The consultants' initial report had insisted that destroying existing housing "offers no serious obstacle to a highway location." The expressway destroyed 1000 homes, cut a block-wide barrier canyon through what had been the neighborhood's historic center, blocked 31 streets and eliminated pedestrian pathways between the newly created halves. However, the neighborhood banded together to rescue Sixth Mount Zion Baptist Church, which had been established in 1867 by Rev. John Jasper and initially occupied a building purchased from white Presbyterians but which had been renovated in 1887 and held 1,400 worshipers. The church secretary, Cerelia Johnson, worked as an elevator operator in Richmond's City Hall, and conveyed discussions she overheard in the corridors of power to pastor Dr. A.W. Brown. The highway (now part of I-95) was rerouted slightly, and the church became the only building to remain on the north side of Duval Street. The turnpike opened in 1958, but Sixth Mount Zion's congregation lost 1,000 members.

Jackson Ward housed many involved in the desegregation battles that culminated in the Massive Resistance crisis of 1955–1965. Lawyers Oliver Hill, Martin A. Martin and Spottswood William Robinson III, represented many Virginians in cases brought with the help of the NAACP. The predecessor firm helped achieve pay equity for black teachers before World War II, and after the war helped desegregate Richmond's schools. The represented the plaintiffs in Davis v. County School Board of Prince Edward County, one of the cases that was part of the U.S. Supreme Court decision in Brown v. Board of Education, which declared segregation in public schools as unconstitutional. After Martin's death, the firm continued with Hill, and later attorneys Samuel Wilbert Tucker and Henry L. Marsh

After desegregation, as black Virginians became more widely integrated into Richmond's other business and residential areas, Jackson Ward's role as a center of black commerce and entertainment declined. Like most older urban neighborhoods of a similar era, the housing stock of Jackson Ward deteriorated as absentee landlords took over from single-family households.

Richmond also developed what became the sixth highest concentration of public housing stock among cities over 200,000 people. For example, the Richmond Housing Authority built Mosby Court East and Mosby Court West in 1962 (all within a mile of Creighton Court, Fairfield Court and Whitcomb Court), then the 30-acre site made possible through urban clearance received a new school, Mosby School, designed to hold 1500 junior high school students and 1000 elementary school students.

In 1966, the General Assembly created the Richmond Metropolitan Authority, with the power of eminent domain, to build a toll road from suburban Chesterfield County (mainly white) to downtown through the black East End and an adjoining low income white neighborhood. It displaced 1,000 people and obliterated the historic Penitentiary Bottom sub-neighborhood.

By the 1970s, Richmond's city council had become majority black, so another proposed superhighway project designed as a downtown bypass (and which would effectively enclose the five public housing projects in a box) received no support. Also, the city council secured identification of the Maggie Walker House as a national landmark, and preservation of the Leigh Street corridor. Nonetheless, the last government-sponsored neighborhood revitalization project (begun in 1970 and with much of the bulldozing completed by 1973) effectively destroyed a 2,800-person multigenerational neighborhood known as Fulton Bottom, before new federal requirements for paying those displaced led to that project becoming stalled until 2011. The Fulton Bottom revitalization plan had reserved most of the 370 acres for industrial sites, and industrial boulevard and flood control.

=== Revival ===
Toward the end of the 20th century, Richmond worked to revitalized Jackson Ward, including its pre-existing housing stock. The National Park Service assisted by restoring the Maggie L. Walker house, as well as listing the neighborhood on the National Register of Historic Places in 1976 and as a historic district in 1978. In the 1980s, historic tax credits by the federal government aided the restoration of dozens of houses on Leigh, Marshall and Clay Streets.

City officials hoped that construction of the Greater Richmond Convention Center and Visitors Bureau at the eastern edge of Jackson Ward would bring renewed vitality to the neighborhood. However, convention center's construction destroyed a number of historic houses (including that used by the Hill, Tucker and Marsh law firm), and separated Jackson Ward from much of downtown. Vacant and substandard houses in the neighborhood have been targeted in Richmond's Neighborhoods in Bloom program. In some areas, the progress of renovation has been slow, most notably with the First Virginia Volunteers Battalion Armory, best known as the Leigh Street Armory. In the mid-1980s, the Richmond School Board leased the armory building to the Black History Museum and Cultural Center of Virginia, and the museum is expected to open in the armory in 2015.

Many Richmond residents have bought houses in Jackson Ward to renovate and restore in order to live in an historic area and revive the cultural character of the neighborhood. Each first Friday of the month, First Fridays Artwalk is held at night on Broad Street. Art Galleries open their doors to an outdoor party that includes live music, including Jazz and Salsa. Local restaurants, bars and a coffee shops serve customers who come to the First Fridays Art Walk. On New Year's Eve 2014, the heavy metal band Gwar opened GwarBar in Jackson Ward. The band described it as "a fantasy land of food and beverage, catering to everyone from local punk metal freaks, rock stars, businessmen, celebrity chefs and starving artists."

Since the start of the 21st century, the neighborhood's reputation has rapidly changed from being that of a high crime neighborhood, into a popular historic district which rivals that of the Fan, and Church Hill. However, the revival of the neighborhood has led to gentrification controversy, particularly since while in 2000 it still had a majority African American population, by 2010 nearly twice as many white people as black lived in the neighborhood. Furthermore, the neighborhood's continued change focuses development on mixed-use new construction as much as restoration of existing historic buildings.

== Architecture and landmarks ==
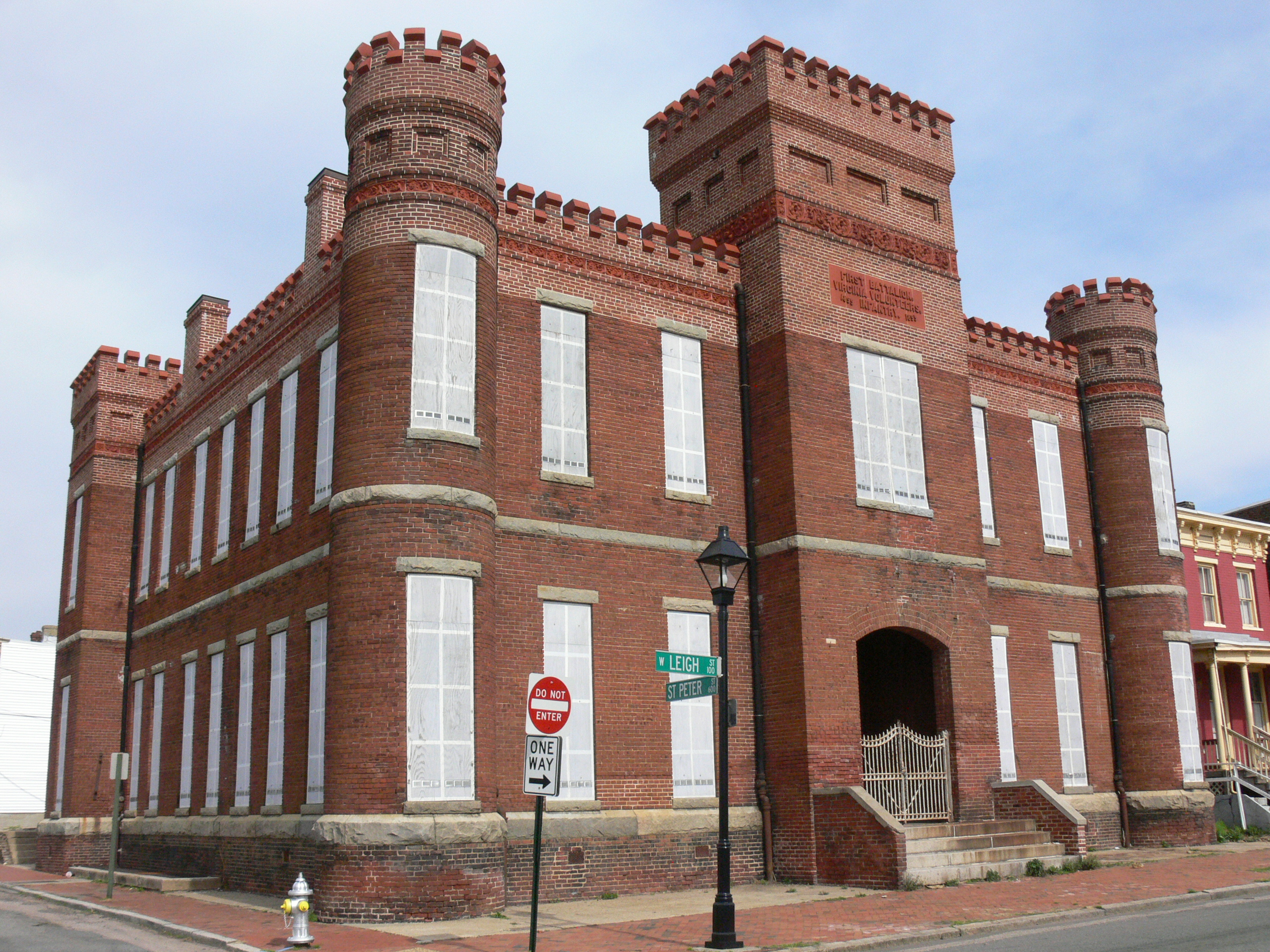
Leigh Street Armory in 2011, refurbished into the Black History Museum and Cultural Center of Virginia in 2016

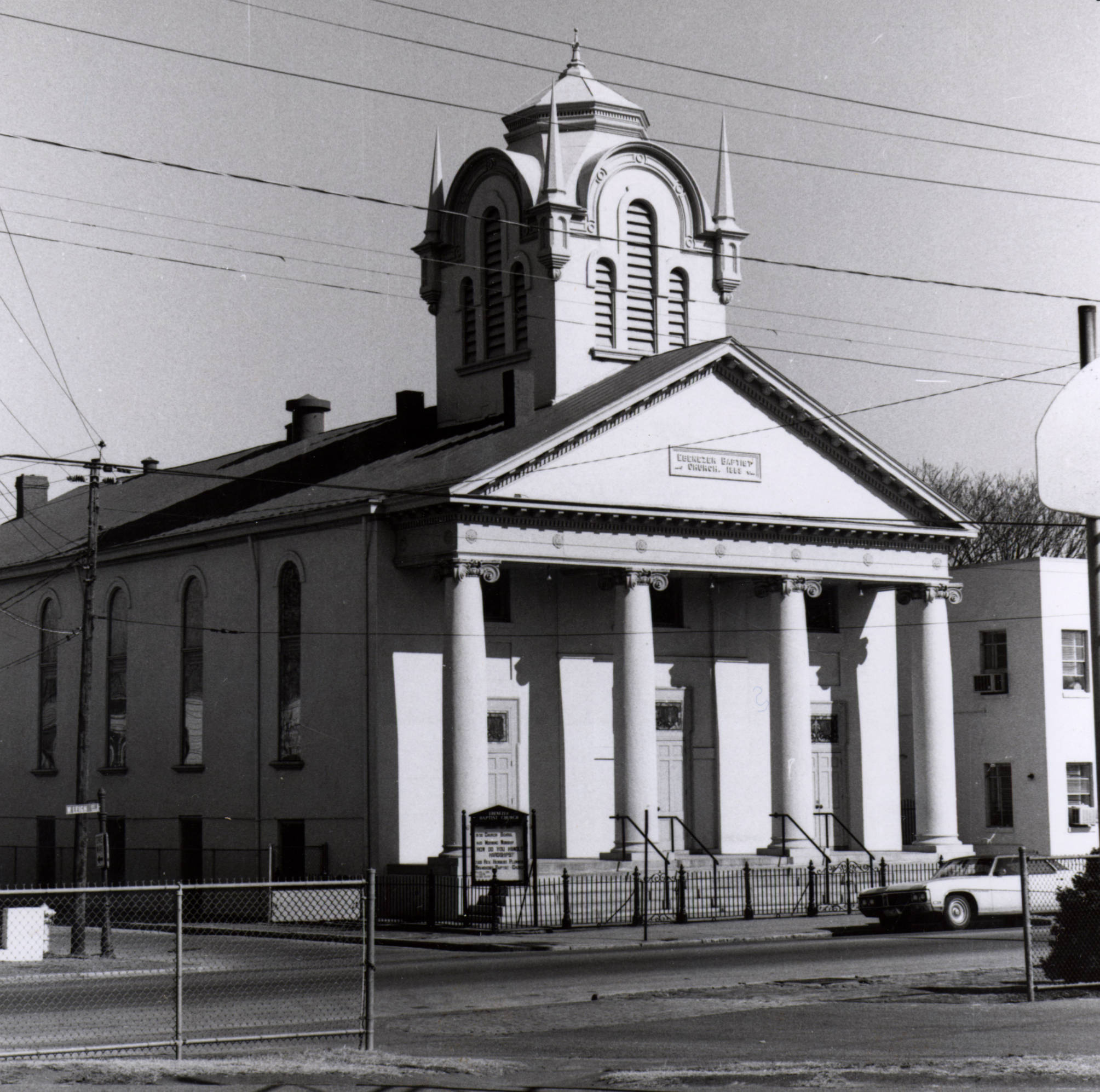
Ebenezer Baptist Church, 1978

The earliest houses of Jackson Ward were a series of small cottages built in the Federal style. By the later 1830s up until the Civil War, the Greek Revival style was prominent, which represents a major part of Richmond's pre-war architectural heritage. And then beginning in the 1850s the Italianate styles. A major part of the district's visual appeal and charm derived from the contrast between the two ornamental and austere characteristics of the two styles.

St. Mary's German Catholic Church was built on Marshal Street to serve the growing German Catholic immigrant community that had moved into greater Richmond from about 1850 to through the 1880s. The center of the neighborhood is dominated by the former Armstrong High School, now the Richmond Public Schools Adult Career Development Center. Armstrong's sports field is now Abner Clay Park, which has a bandstand, football field, basketball court and tennis facilities.

Charles Thaddeus Russell was one of Virginia's first licensed black architects. A majority of the workers and contractors hired by Russell were black. He designed homes in and businesses in Jackson Ward. He also designed many buildings in an area that was known as “Black Wall Street of America.”

Historic churches in Jackson Ward include the Third Street Bethel African Methodist Episcopal Church, the Hood Temple African Methodist Episcopal Church, the Ebenezer Baptist Church and the Sixth Mount Zion Baptist Church. The Sixth Mount Zion Baptist Church was known as the home of African-American evangelist pastor Rev. John Jasper, whose famous "Sun Do Move" sermon brought him fame .

The Leigh Street Armory building was revitalized, and since 2016 is the home of the Black History Museum and Cultural Center of Virginia, which was previously located at 00 Clay Street in Jackson Ward.

The long invisible Shockoe Hill African Burying Ground is located in Jackson Ward. Likely the largest burial ground for free people of color and the enslaved in the United States, it is one of Virginia's most endangered historic places. Established in 1816 as two (1 acre) plots by the city of Richmond, it is estimated to have received over 22,000 interments and expanded to a little over 31 acres before it was closed to new burials in 1879 due to overcrowded conditions. The burial ground was added to the Virginia Landmarks Register and National Register of Historic Places as part of the Shockoe Hill Burying Ground Historic District in 2022. The heart of this burial ground is located at 1305 N 5th St.

== See also ==
- Neighborhoods of Richmond, Virginia
- List of National Historic Landmarks in Virginia
- National Register of Historic Places listings in Richmond, Virginia
- St Luke Building, Richmond, Virginia
- Negro Development and Exposition Company
