= George Blackwell =

George Blackwell may refer to:

- George Blackwell (priest) (1545–1613)
- George Lincoln Blackwell (1861–1926), American author
- George Blackwell (horse racing) (1861–1942)
- George W. Blackwell, American lawyer
