= August Moon =

American musician and activist (1937–2023)

- August Moon

Background information
- Also known as: Mr. Wiggles, Little Red, Dickie Diamond, Donald Ruffin, Diamond Duxx Dixie
- Born: Alexander Randolph; August 7, 1937; Richmond, Virginia, U.S.A.
- Died: July 12, 2023 (aged 85); Richmond, Virginia, U.S.A.
- Genres: R&B
- Occupations: musician, producer, songwriter, record label owner
- Years active: c.1960s – c.2020s
- Labels: Golden Triangle, Fat Back, Sound of Soul, Soul International, Style, Urban Beat

August Moon (August 7, 1937 – July 12, 2023) was an American R&B singer known as Mr. Wiggles, a songwriter, producer, record label owner, and community activist.

== Early years ==
August Moon was born Alexander Randolph in a two-room shack in the Blackwell neighborhood on the Southside of Richmond, Virginia. His father was Freddie Price and his mother was Gladys Randolph Crawley. Moon was one of five siblings. He was raised for the most part by his great-grandmother. As a child he danced for tips on the streets of Richmond, where he got the nickname Mr. Wiggles. He said it was all about the moves, claiming no one could outdance him. Asked by interviewer Nick Spitzer in 2004 if he could dance, Mr. Wiggles told him, "I can do more tricks with my body than a monkey does with a peanut." Moon recalled how as a ten-year-old he "used to carry groceries, shine shoes, (and) carry newspapers" to make money. He and his friends formed a washboard band, and "I'd sing and dance and play a little plastic saxophone." Moon got into minor scrapes, and was made a ward of the state because he didn't have a father. He was put into the Hanover Juvenile Correctional Center for three years. After his release in 1954, he joined the U.S. Navy and served four years on the aircraft carrier USS Midway.

== Music career ==
Upon returning to Richmond, Moon had success in talent shows hosted by disc jockey Allen Knight at the Hippodrome Theater. Knight helped guide Moon into a career as a singer, which led to performing on package tours with Ruth Brown, Chuck Berry and Fats Domino. He moved to New Jersey and performed in the New York area. Besides being known as Mr. Wiggles, Moon worked using other names including Little Red and Dickie Diamond. He later recounted how he was scheduled to appear on Alan Freed's TV show "The Big Beat" the day Freed's payola scandal broke, but never got his chance. In the mid-1960s he recorded a series of singles at Bell Sound Studios in New York City as Mr. Wiggles, including his signature song "Home Boy", a paean to his hometown. He also laid down tracks in Philadelphia and Muscle Shoals. Moon had a few regional hits, including "Fat Back" and "Wash My Back". He taught himself about studio production and learned to operate sound equipment, releasing his own music as well as recordings of his protegees. The first time he worked in a studio was on tracks by the Upsetters, formerly Little Richard's backup band. Moon said of his own trademark "Fatback" sound, "Fatback ain't nothing but bottom- baritone and bass." He started several record labels in the 1960s, including Sound of Soul, Soul International, and Golden Triangle, releasing his own discs as Mr. Wiggles and others for such R&B artists as Little Tommy, Larry Saunders, Dickie Wonder, and Sebastian Williams.

Moon is best known for the 1976 album by The Whole Darn Family, a group he managed, recorded, and produced. At the height of their fame the band toured the U.S. and appeared on the music program "Soul Train". Their album "The Whole Darn Family Has Arrived" featured an integrated funk band playing original material. Bassist Woudy Hughes composed and played the funky bass part on track four "Seven Minutes Of Funk", a song sampled in 51 subsequent recordings by artists such as Jay-Z, Grandmaster Flash and The Furious Five, Busta Rhymes, Public Enemy, and Wu-Tang Clan. The band, led by Tyrone "Little Tommy" Thomas (drums), also included Joel Smither (sax and flute), Odis Hamlin (sax), Girard "Giz" Bowe (trumpet and flugelhorn), Tommy "T-Bar" Bryant (guitar), and Clifton Smith (keyboards).

In the 1980s Moon started Urban Beat and Style Records, among Richmond's first rap labels. He released recordings by acts including Cool Carl, American Express, and M.C. Rockwale.

== Legal problems ==
Moon twice served time in prison in New Jersey. In the early 1960s he was sentenced for selling drugs. He also served four years in the 1970s for a second degree murder conviction. He filed suit in the United States Court of Claims in 1981 against the Department of Justice's Witness Protection Program for breach of an alleged implied contract. Moon claimed that in return for his testimony against organized figures and corrupt government officials the Department of Justice promised him money and new identities for him and his family. The case was dismissed after the court ruled that participants in the Witness Protection Program have no contractual rights with the United States of a nature to be enforceable in the United States Court of Claims.

== Later years ==
Virginia governor Douglas Wilder restored Moon's voting rights in 1993. Four years later then-governor George Allen proclaimed August 7, 1997 as August Moon Day for his "remarkable and adventurous life" and "the many contributions he made to the people of the Commonwealth." His lifelong support of his Blackwell neighborhood gained him the sobriquet "Mayor of Hull Street". "He wasn't afraid to say it like it was, and people didn't boss him around," former governor Wilder said of August Moon. J.J. Minor, president of the Richmond branch of the NAACP, called Moon "an icon, a legend, a mentor, a man who was not afraid to stand up for what's right." He hosted a public access TV program called "Tell It Like It Is", dealing with community and political issues, reminding his audience that "if you don't stand for something, you'll fall for anything." Moon told writer Vernal Coleman, "All my life I wanted to be an activist. I didn't want to be a politician. I didn't want to be a preacher. I just want to be what I am, in show business and an activist."

Moon died at age 85 on July 12, 2023, after a long illness. He was survived by his wife Michon, formerly the Victim-Witness program director of the Office of the Commonwealth's Attorney, and his two daughters, Dr. Sesha Joi Moon, the director of the Office of Diversity and Inclusion with the U.S. House of Representatives and Enjoli Moon, assistant curator for film and public programs at VCU's Institute for Contemporary Art, and the founder and organizer of Richmond's Afrikana Film Festival. August Moon was buried on the Southside of Richmond in Maury Cemetery.

== Discography ==
- Wash My Back (GT 100A) b/w Home Boy (GT 100B) – Golden Triangle Records (1964)
- Paul Revere (WO 100) b/w Home Boy (WO 100) – Fat Back Records (1964)
- T. Model Ford (RA 8006 A) b/w Chewin' The Fat (RA 8006 B) – Raven Records (1964)
- Fat Back (Part I) (P-104-A) b/w Fat Back (Part II) (Instrumental) (P-104-B) – Parkway Records (1966)

Mr. Wiggles & His Sound Of Soul Family – Sound Of Soul Records (2002) CD

- Track 4- Wash My Back
- Track 9- Leo The Lion
- Track 14- Leo The Lion (instrumental)
- Track 16- Agent "00 Soul"

Mr. Wiggles Instrumental Soul – Sound Of Soul Records (2003) CD- SOS 115

Mr. Wiggles Again – Sound Of Soul Records (2004) CD- SOS 1002

Mr. Wiggles Classic Soul – Sound Of Soul Records (2004) CD

Mr. Wiggles A Classic Soul Journey – Sound Of Soul Records CD

- Track 3- Wash My Back
- Track 8- Ride Paul Revere
- Track 12- T-Model Ford

Where Did Peace Go – Sound Of Soul Records (2005) CD

Lookey Dookey- Rhythm & Blooz Records (Germany) CD- CR-CD-TTRB 5463

- Track 18- Home Boy
