= Adolph Dill =

American businessman and baker

Adolph Dill (1792 – August 13, 1867), also known as Addolph Dill, was an American businessman, landowner, and baker during the Antebellum era in Richmond, Virginia. The Confederate States Army took over Dill's bakery to supply soldiers in 1864, re-naming it the "C. S. Bakery".

== Biography ==
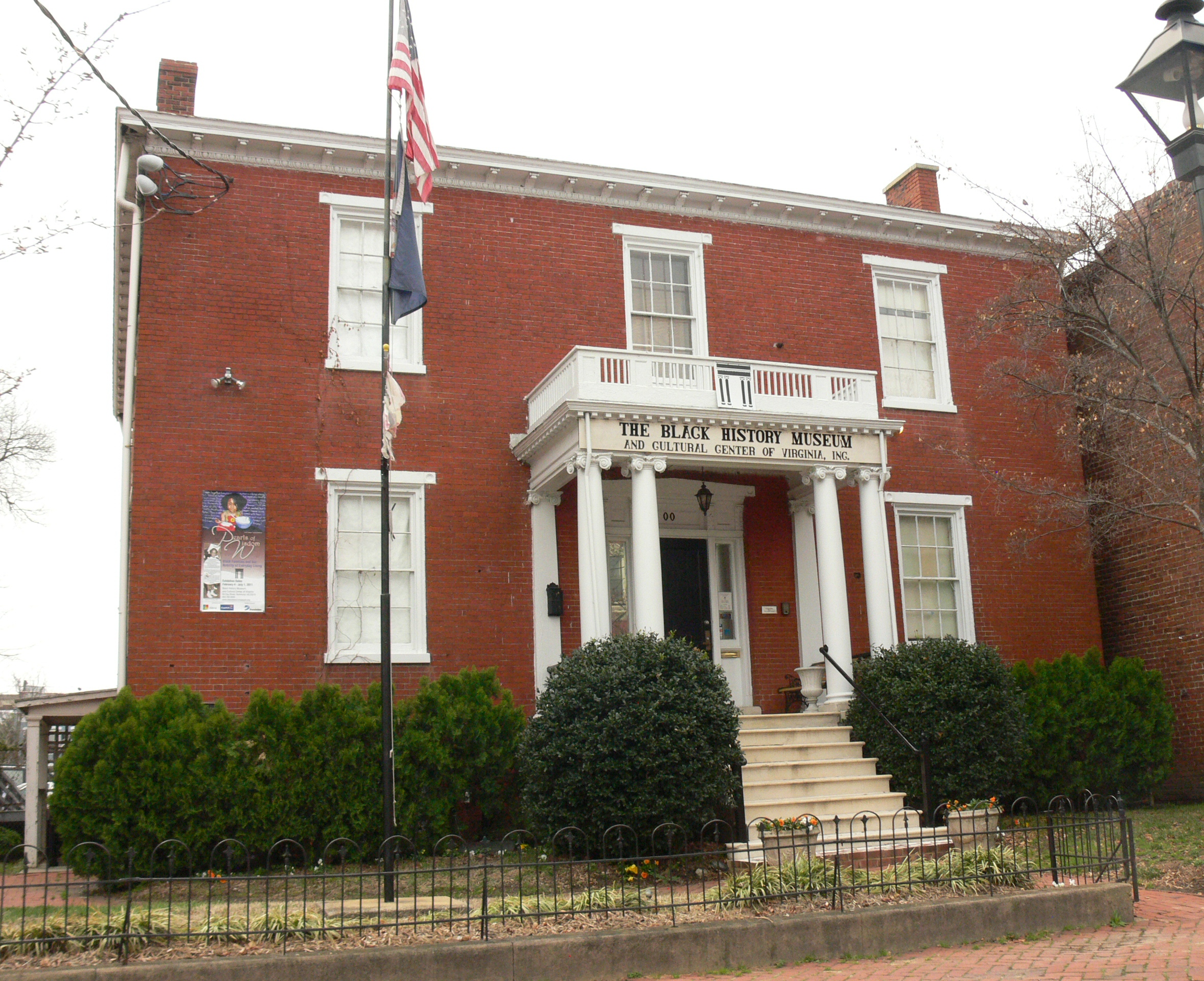
Dill's house at 00 Clay Street, Jackson Ward, Richmond, Virginia

Adolph Dill has been incorrectly reported as being Jewish. In fact he was the son of immigrant Nicholas Dill b.1760 in Meddersheim, Germany and Christiana Gottliebin Gussman b.1758 in Lancaster, Pennsylvania. Nicholas and Christiana married in 1786 at St. Michael and Zion Evangelical Lutheran church in Germantown, Philadelphia. <PENNSYLVANIA ARCHIVES - MARRIAGES Second Series, Volume IX Published under the Direction of Matthew S Quay, Secretary of the Commonwealth, 1880>. Adolph was born in Georgetown, DC <US Census 1850 Richmond VA> and came to Richmond in 1819. In 1837 was listed as a member of the vestry at St. James Episcopal Church 5th and Marshall in Richmond. <Richmond Times Dispatch 30 Sep 1912 Last Service in Historic Church"> He had a home at 00 Clay Street in what is now Jackson Ward, and owned property in the Chestnut Hill/Plateau Historic District area. His home, built in 1832, later became a women's club with a circulating library, and then a library for African Americans, and later the Black History Museum and Cultural Center of Virginia before it relocated. Dill also was the third owner of the Ellen Glasgow House at 1 Main Street.

He baked mainly loaf bread and also crackers. In 1831, he testified about the flour he used and mill operations and inspections in the area.

== Legacy ==
Adolph Dill Jr., his son, worked at the bakery business, and later enlisted as a private in the 21st Virginia Infantry Regiment for service in the Confederate States Army during the American Civil War. By 1911, Dill Jr. owned and showed dogs, including an award winning setter.

His two sons J. G. Dill (or Joseph Gorgas Dill) and Adolph Dill Jr. were involved in the tobacco business starting in either 1848 or 1885, with pipe tobacco brand J. G. Dill's Co., and a line of pipe cleaners.

Park Boulevard in Highland Park Plaza Historic District, Richmond, Virginia was originally named Dill Street/Dill Avenue.
