= Abraham Peyton Skipwith =

First Black homeowner in Jackson Ward

Abraham Peyton Skipwith was the first Black homeowner in Jackson Ward, a Black urban neighborhood located in Richmond, Virginia.

== Early life ==
Skipwith was enslaved by Jaquelin Ambler, who served on the Council of State for Governor Thomas Jefferson, and his wife, Rebecca Burwell, in as early as 1767 near Williamsburg, Virginia. In 1785, he filed a legislative petition for his freedom with the Virginia General Assembly, which included a testimony by Benjamin Harrison V, who was a signer of the Declaration of Independence, as well as the father of the 9th President and great-grandfather of the 23rd President of the United States of America.

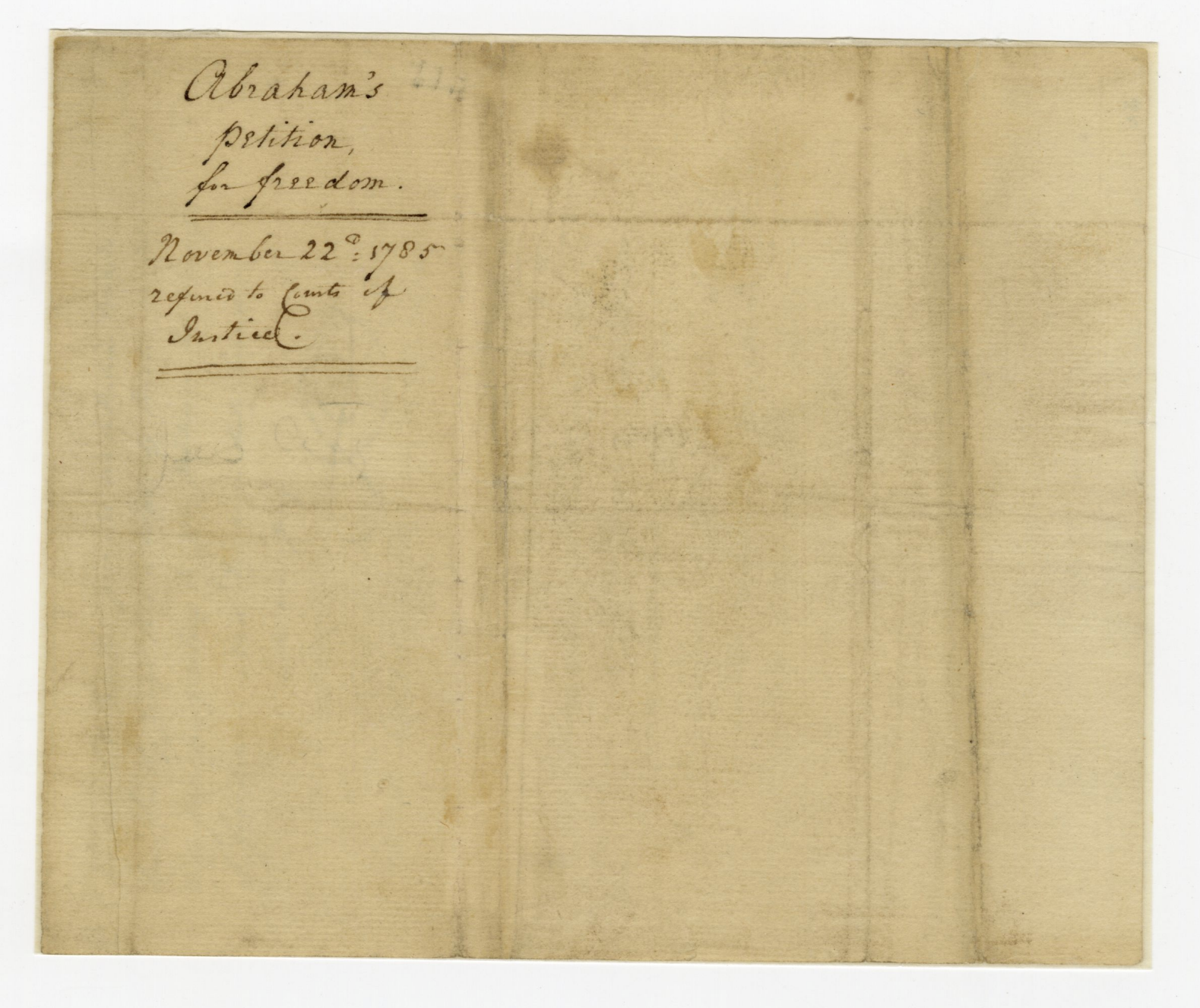
Abraham Peyton Skipwith filed a legislative petition for freedom in 1785 with the Virginia General Assembly, which was granted by the Virginia Speaker of the House in 1789.

== Skipwith-Roper Cottage ==
In 1789, Skipwith purchased his manumission and in 1793, he purchased parcels of land near Richmond, Virginia for 15 pounds and 5 shillings. He built a three-story gambrel-roofed cottage known as the Skipwith-Roper Cottage, which is one of the city's oldest documented dwellings. In 1797, he left a detailed will. In 1957, the cottage was sold by the Richmond-Petersburg Turnpike Authority for $25 to accommodate the construction of Interstate 95 and was dislocated to the former tobacco plantation of the Secretary of War for the Confederate Army.

== JXN Project ==
A non-profit organization based in Richmond, Virginia, called The JXN Project, which was founded by Sesha Joi Moon and Enjoli Moon, reconstructed the cottage in Jackson Ward as part of the United States Semiquincentennial. The reconstruction was featured in an exhibition titled "House to Highway: Reclaiming a Community History" at the Library of Virginia by the National Endowment of the Humanities and Andrew W. Mellon Foundation, as well as in a film titled "Declarations of Independence: Black Americans and the Building of a Nation" by PBS.
