= Negro Development and Exposition Company =

Part of the 1907 Jamestown Exposition

Coordinates: 37.548949°N 77.446734°W

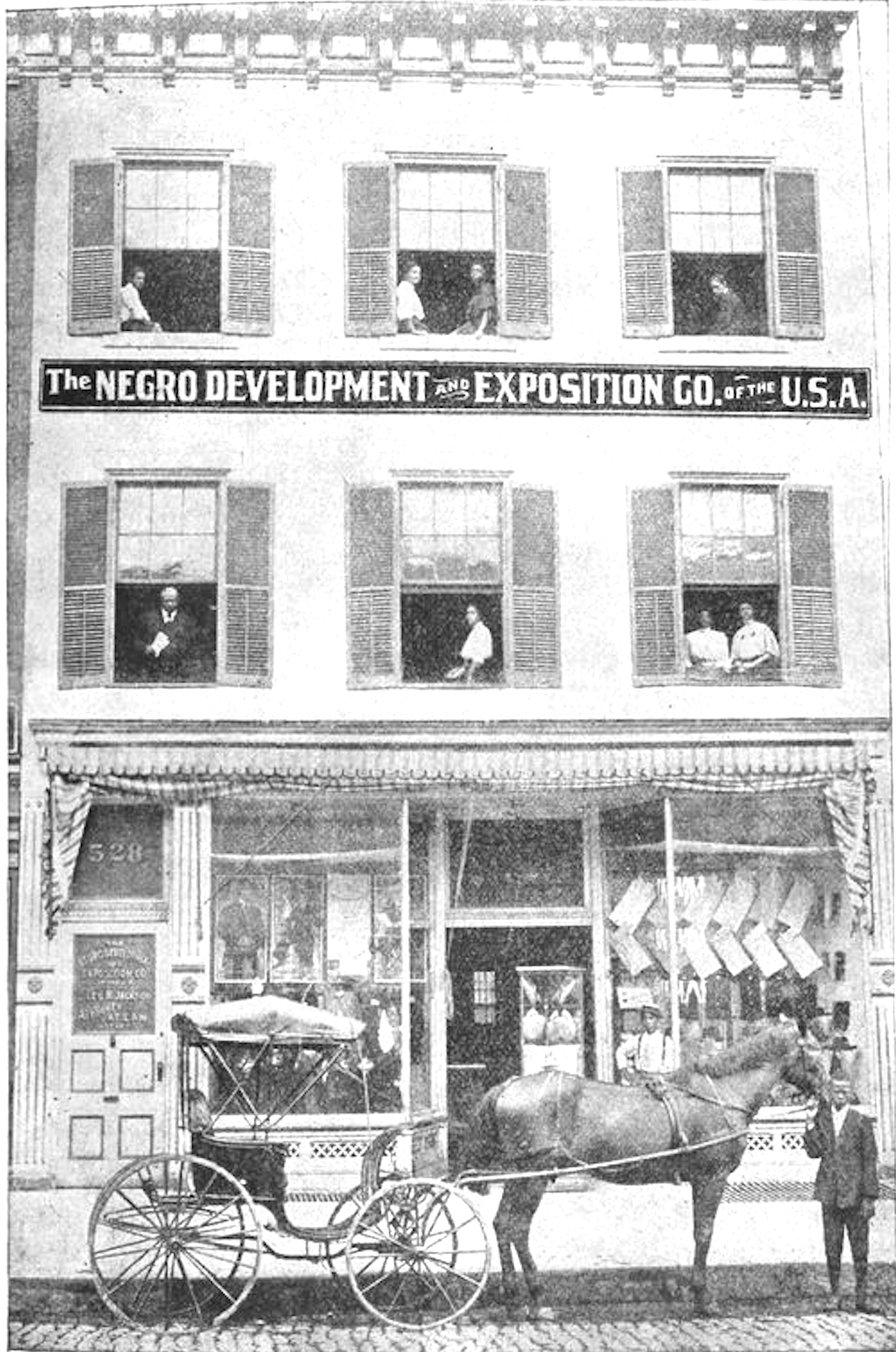
Negro Development and Exposition Co. building (1911), Jackson Ward, Richmond, Virginia

The Negro Development and Exposition Company of the United States of America, was an organization established in 1903 by Giles Beecher Jackson. It was also known as the Negro Development and Exposition Co. (NDEC), and the Negro Development and Exposition Company of the U.S.A.. It was headquartered at 528 Broad Street in the Jackson Ward neighborhood of Richmond, Virginia, the initial purpose of the company was to support an exhibit dedicated to African Americans in the "Negro Building" at the 1907 Jamestown Exposition. There were public issues with financials and accounting by the NDEC, and in 1908, they were faced with a breach of contract lawsuit related to the 1907 Jamestown Exposition.

The NDEC capitalized on the display of African American achievements. Their goal was the creating the first national museum to highlight African American achievement history, but which was never created.

== See also ==
- Academy of Achievement, another American achievement-based organization
- Black History Museum and Cultural Center of Virginia
- Grand United Order of True Reformers, an organization associated with Giles B. Jackson
- The Exhibit of American Negroes, displayed at the 1900 World's Fair in Paris
- National Half Century Exposition and Lincoln Jubilee, Chicago in 1915
