= Hippodrome Theater (Richmond, Virginia) =

Coordinates: 37.54719°N 77.43793°W

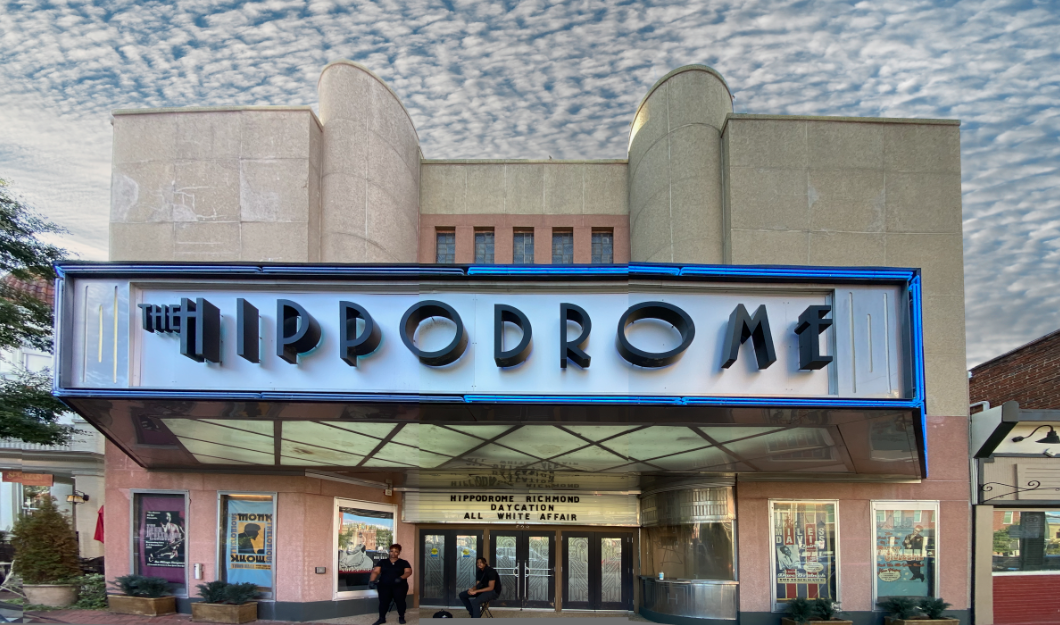

The Hippodrome Theater is located in Richmond, Virginia. It is situated in the historical African-American neighborhood of Jackson Ward, which was referred to as "The Harlem of the South" during the 1920s. The Hippodrome Theater was originally opened as a vaudeville and movie theater and was a stop on the "Chitlin' Circuit" of places considered safe and acceptable for African American entertainers in the era of racial segregation in the United States. Today, The Hippodrome Theater has been restored to a fully functioning performance venue in hopes of reclaiming its prominent role in African-American cultural history.

== Early history ==
The Hippodrome Theater was opened in 1914 by Charles A. Somma as a vaudeville and movie theater. The theater played a major role in the entertainment of Richmond's African-American community during the early 20th century. It is located on Second Street in Richmond, which was once known as The Deuce. The Deuce was a famous center of black commerce in Richmond and the street was lined with stores, restaurants, banks, and theaters. Essentially, The Deuce was the esteemed location in Richmond for black nightlife and The Hippodrome Theater was one of The Deuce's leading attractions from the 1920s to the 1940s. During this period, Richmond's African-American community was heavily influenced by New York City's Harlem Renaissance and the theater attracted big performers who were prominent in the cultural movement's performance scene. These performers included talents such as Billie Holiday, Bill Robinson, Ray Charles, Nat King Cole, Louis Armstrong, Moms Mabley, James Brown, Ida Cox, Ella Fitzgerald and countless others who performed on the Hippodrome's stage. In 1937, The Hippodrome Theater was purchased from Charles A. Somma by the Abe Lichtman theater chain.

== History: 1940s to 1980s ==
In 1945, The Hippodrome Theater caught fire. The origin of the fire was never fully determined, although it was believed to be caused by a short circuit in the theater's wiring. In 1947, The Hippodrome reopened its doors to the public. After the fire the theater was renovated and remodeled in an Art Deco style of architecture. The updated theater included new features such as air conditioning and the latest technical equipment. The elaborate ceremony for the reopening of the historical theater attracted an impressive crowd of 2,500 individuals. Once the theater was reopened after the fire, it functioned primarily as a movie theater throughout the 1950s. The Hippodrome Theater closed again in the 1960s, re-opened again, then closed once again in the 1970s and functioned as a church for a short period of time. The Hippodrome Theater reopened in the 1980s as a movie theater .

== Present ==
The current owner of the Hippodrome Theater is Ronald Stalling. The Hippodrome Theater still remains a functioning theater that continues to hold performances on the legendary stage as well as offering film showings.

Directly beside the theater lies the Taylor Mansion, which was originally the home of Rev. William Lee Taylor. The mansion was built in 1907 by the architect John A. Lankford and today it functions as the Speakeasy Grill restaurant, which specializes in southeastern cuisine. The Hippodrome Theater and the Taylor Mansion are part of Stalling's current project of returning Jackson Ward and the notorious Second Street to the important African-American cultural sphere it functioned as during the early 20th century.
