= Duke William Anderson =

American minister and educator (1812–1873)

Justice of the Peace for the District of Columbia
- In office April 8, 1869 – February 17, 1873
- President: Ulysses S. Grant

Personal details
- Born: April 10, 1812 Lawrenceville, Illinois, U.S.
- Died: February 17, 1873 (aged 60) Washington, D.C., U.S.
- Children: 5
- Boards: Howard University; Freedman's Savings Bank; Washington Asylum

Duke William "D.W." Anderson (April 10, 1812 – February 17, 1873) was an American minister, educator, farmer, and participant in the Underground Railroad. Anderson was the first Black person to serve as a Justice of the Peace in the United States.

== Early life and family ==
Duke William Anderson was born on April 10, 1812, in Lawrenceville, Illinois. His father was white and his mother was African American. His father died while Anderson was still an infant. In September 1830, Anderson married Ruth Ann Lucas. They had five children.

== Career ==
For several years, Anderson worked as a farmer on the land he owned, which included several horses, a wheat and corn field, and a large apple orchard. After his first wife died in childbirth, Anderson sold his land and became a school teacher in Vincennes, Indiana and later Alton, Illinois.

In 1843, Anderson became an ordained Baptist minister. In 1845, he moved to Woodburn, Illinois with his second wife, Mary Jane Ragens, where he purchased an 80-acre farm, became a schoolteacher, and started a new Baptist church.

Anderson moved to Quincy, Illinois to pursue his work on the Underground Railroad. He moved to Buffalo, New York in 1853 to take charge of a Baptist church, and moved to Detroit in 1857. During this period, he became affiliated with the Canadian Anti-Slavery Baptist Association, which he served as presiding officer in 1859. His second wife died in 1860. After the end of the American Civil War, Anderson married his third wife, Eliza Shand. After the end of the American Civil War, Anderson married his third wife, Eliza Shand.

In 1865, he accepted the call as minister of the Nineteenth Street Baptist Church in Washington, D.C.

Anderson played a pivotal role in rebuilding efforts in post-Civil War Washington, and worked to advance economic and educational opportunities for African Americans. In addition to his work as a minister, he was elected a trustee of Howard University, and served as board vice president of the Freedman's Savings Bank. In 1867, Anderson was an original landowner in the Barry Farm settlement in Southeast Washington, D.C.

In 1869, at the request of Sayles Jenks Bowen, Anderson was appointed by President Ulysses S. Grant as the first Black Justice of the Peace in the United States. Anderson was appointed as President of the Board of Commissioners of Washington Asylum in 1871, and re-appointed as Justice of the Peace by President Grant in 1872.

== Death ==
Anderson died on February 17, 1873, in Washington, D.C. His body lay in state at the Nineteenth Street Baptist Church. His funeral was reported to have been one of the largest held in Washington since the funeral of President Lincoln.

He was originally buried in the old Columbian Harmony Cemetery but is believed to have been among those reinterred in the National Harmony Memorial Park.
