= James Blackwell (educator) =

American educator and businessman (1864–1931)

James H. Blackwell
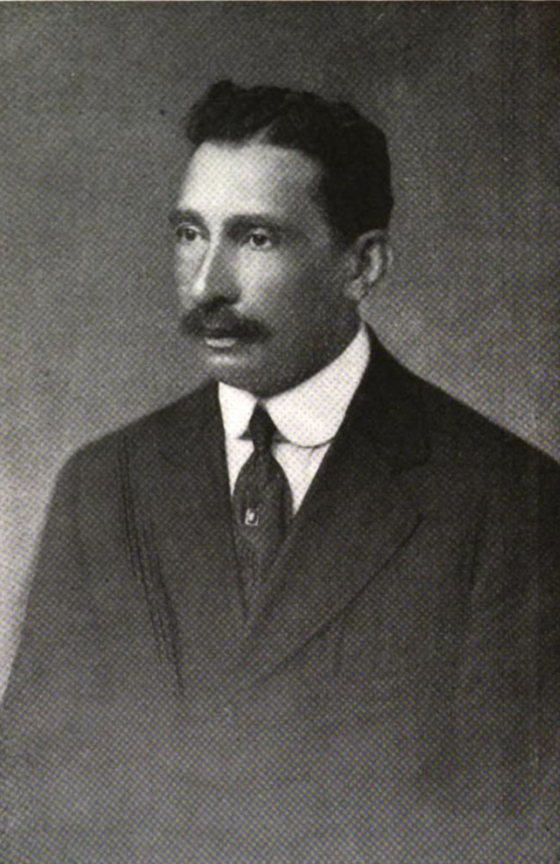
- Photograph of Blackwell published in 1921
- Born: February 5, 1864; Marion, Virginia, C.S.
- Died: October 14, 1931 (aged 67); Richmond, Virginia, U.S.
- Resting place: Mount Olivet Cemetery
- Education: Richmond Theological Institute; Virginia Union University; Princeton University
- Occupations: Educator, businessman
- Years active: 1880–1931
- Political party: Republican
- Spouse: Annie Estelle Jordan
- Children: 3, including George W. Blackwell

James Heyward Blackwell (February 5, 1864 – October 14, 1931) was an American educator and businessman. He was one of the first African Americans to serve as a principal in Virginia, founded several financial services companies for African Americans, and is the namesake of the Richmond neighborhood of Blackwell and the J.H. Blackwell Elementary School.

== Early life and education ==
James Heyward Blackwell was born into slavery on February 5, 1864 in Marion, Virginia, the eldest of four children. By 1870, Blackwell's family had moved to Manchester, Virginia. Although his parents could not write or read, they encouraged Blackwell to pursue an education. In 1872, Blackwell began being tutored by Anthony Binga Jr., the only African American teacher in the public schools in Manchester.

In 1880, Blackwell graduated from the Richmond Theological Institute. He later attended Virginia Union University and received a Ph.D. in philosophy from Princeton University.

== Career ==
=== Education ===
Blackwell started his teaching career in 1880, first working as a teacher in New Kent County, and later in Manchester. The first school for Black Americans, the Dunbar School, opened in Manchester in 1882, and Blackwell was selected as one of the first teachers. In 1888, he became principal of the school. Blackwell was credited with creating the high school curriculum at the school. After the consolidation of the cities of Manchester and Richmond in 1910, Blackwell was demoted to a teacher from his principal position, as Richmond did not permit African Americans to serve as principals. Blackwell retired from teaching in 1922.

=== Business ===
In 1891, Blackwell established the Virginia Industrial Mercantile and Building and Loan Association, serving as secretary and general manager of the organization. The organization sought to promote "industrial and material advancement" for African American industrialists in the state, and provided loans to aspiring African American homeowners. Due to the Panic of 1893, the organization became insolvent. After economic conditions improved, Blackwell helped establish the Benevolent Investment and Relief Association in 1898. The company issued over 12,000 insurance policies to African Americans and had branch locations in Virginia, Washington, D.C., and Maryland. Blackwell also served as president of the Richmond Business College.

Other business activities of Blackwell included founding the Southside Realty Company, serving as president of the Loprice Land Corporation, and holding officer roles at the Hawkins Company, Second Street Savings Bank, and the World's Wonder Chemical Company. He also managed two employment agencies for African Americans, including the Interstate Colored Teachers Agency and the Better Service Bureau.

=== Activism ===
Blackwell was involved as a speaker and organizer in the Grand United Order of True Reformers, a temperance-focused fraternal organization that advocated for the African-American middle class through economic opportunities and education. He was also the treasurer of the Virginia Baptist State Sabbath School Convention, and served as president of the Smallwood Institute from 1915 to 1916.

== Personal life ==
In July 1885, Blackwell married Annie Estelle Jordan. They had three children, including George W. Blackwell, who became an Illinois state legislator.

== Death ==
Blackwell died on October 14, 1931 and is buried at Mount Olivet Cemetery.

== Legacy and honors ==
In 1952, the Richmond School Board renamed the Dunbar School to the J.H. Blackwell Elementary School. Blackwell is the namesake of Richmond's Blackwell neighborhood and the Blackwell Community Center.

In 2014, Blackwell was named as a Strong Men and Women in Virginia History honoree by the Library of Virginia.
