= Ebenezer Baptist Church (Richmond, Virginia) =

Church in Richmond, Virginia

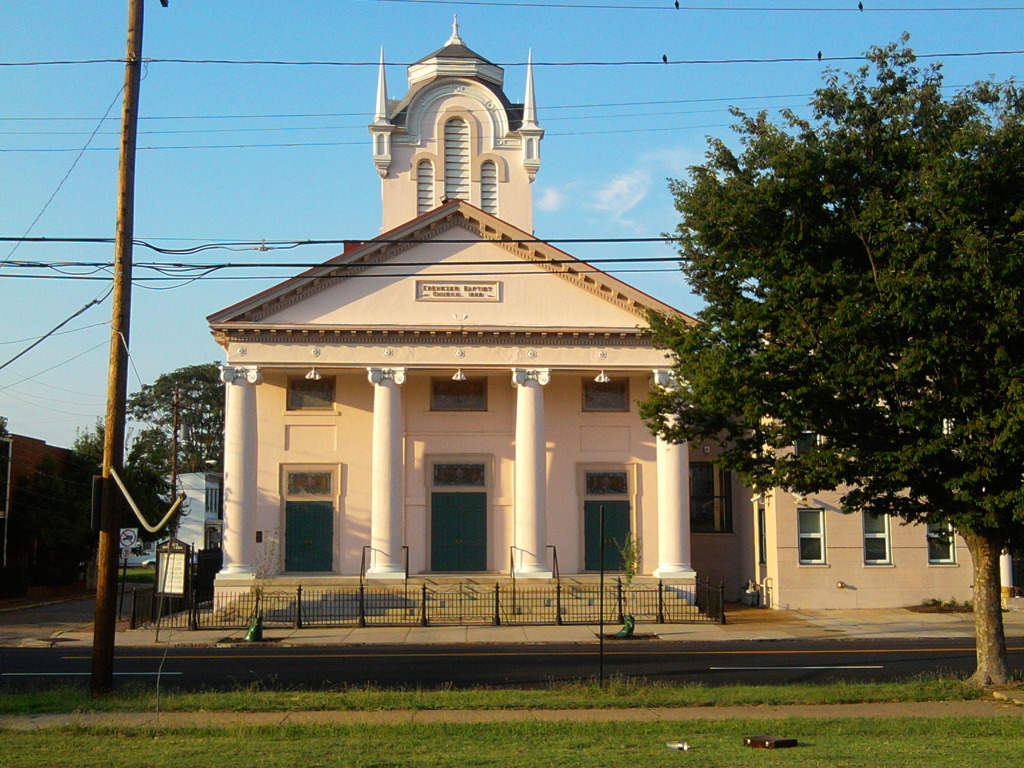
- Ebenezer Baptist Church
- 37.550875°N 77.441911°W
- Address: 216 West Leigh Street, Jackson Ward, Richmond, Virginia, U.S.
- Website: Official website

History
- Former name: Third African Baptist Church
- Founded: 1858

Clergy
- Pastor: Rev. Adam L. Bond

Ebenezer Baptist Church, formerly known as the Third African Baptist Church, is a prominent Black church built in 1858 and located in the Jackson Ward neighborhood of Richmond, Virginia. The site location has a historical marker (marker SA-96). It is one part of the Jackson Ward Historic District, a National Register of Historic Places-listing since July 30, 1976.

== History ==
The Ebenezer Baptist Church was built in 1858 by a congregation of some 400 people; it was an offshoot of the First African Baptist Church, which experienced issues of overcrowding. It was originally named the Third African Baptist Church, but after one year the name was changed to Ebenezer Baptist Church. In 1866, Ebenezer opened the first public school for African-American children in the city of Richmond. In 1883, Hartshorn Memorial College started in the basement of Ebenezer, where it existed for one year. In the early 20th-century a remodel with alternations was done to the building by architect Charles Thaddeus Russell, which included the addition of a cupola with four spires.

In 1865, Rev. Peter Randolph was the first African American to serve as pastor of Ebenezer Baptist Church. Rev. Richard Wells was the pastor starting in 1870 and served for 24 years, under his leadership church membership reached 1,500 parishioners. Wells also served as the president of the Virginia Baptist State Convention. Since 2020, Rev. Adam L. Bond is the pastor.

In 2022, Ebenezer hosted the Reconnect Jackson Ward project, a public discussion and plan to reconnect the neighborhood of Jackson Ward (in an attempt of undoing the history of building Interstate 95 and redlining on the community).

== Notable people ==
- Ruth B. Blair, the first African-American female police officer in Richmond
- Lois Harrison-Jones, the first African-American female superintendent of schools in Richmond
- William Lee Taylor (1854–1915) African-American Baptist minister, bank president, and farmer; formerly enslaved and worked at Ebenezer as a clerk

== See also ==
- Hartshorn Memorial College
