= Lillian Atkins Clark =

American physician

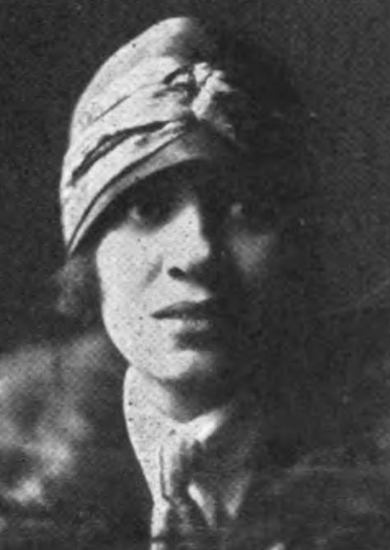
- Lillian Atkins Clark, from a 1925 issue of The Crisis
- Born: Lillian Atkins; April 29, 1897; Richmond, Virginia
- Died: March 28, 1934 (aged 36); Hampton, Virginia, US
- Occupation: Physician

Lillian Atkins Clark (April 29, 1897 – March 28, 1934) was an American physician. She was the first African American woman to pass the National Board of Medical Examiners. She worked as a medical doctor in Philadelphia in hospitals and in her own practice.

== Early life and education ==
Lillian Atkins was born in Richmond, Virginia, the daughter of Dr. William E. Atkins and Ida Binga Atkins of Hampton, Virginia. Her father was a physician. Her maternal grandfather was Anthony Binga Jr., a prominent black Baptist clergyman. She attended Shaw University on a scholarship, where she had an excellent academic record. She then studied at the Women's Medical College of Pennsylvania and earned the school's Anatomy Prize. She was a member of Delta Sigma Theta sorority.

== Career ==
Atkins passed the National Board of Medical Examiners in 1924 and was the first African American woman to pass the board. She worked as chief resident physician at Frederick Douglass Memorial Hospital. Her focus as a doctor was on women's and children's health and she also worked as an assistant to Nathan Francis Mossell, the hospital's medical director and superintendent. Clark opened an office in North Philadelphia in 1925.

== Personal life ==
Lillian Atkins married Hugh T. Clark in 1923. After being ill for nearly a year, Clark died at age 36 years, in Hampton, Virginia, where she had moved in with her mother. She was buried in Elmerton Cemetery. The disposition of her considerable estate was disputed in court, with her widower and her sister each claiming to be the chief legatee.
