= Canadian Anti-Slavery Baptist Association =

Anti-slavery religious organization

The Canadian Anti-Slavery Baptist Association (CASBA) was an organization established in Canada West (now Ontario) during the mid-19th century, dedicated to opposing slavery and promoting the spiritual and social welfare of Black communities. CASBA played a significant role in the anti-slavery movement and the development of Black Baptist churches in Canada.

== History ==
During the 19th century, Canada, particularly Canada West, became a refuge for African Americans escaping slavery in the United States via the Underground Railroad. The influx of Black settlers led to the establishment of communities that sought both spiritual guidance and social support. Baptist congregations, among other denominations, emerged to serve these communities, addressing both religious needs and the pressing issue of slavery.

In 1851, the Canadian Anti-Slavery Baptist Association was formed as a response to differing views within the Baptist community regarding affiliations with American Baptist organizations and the stance on slavery. Some Canadian Baptist congregations chose to affiliate with the American Baptist Free Mission Society (ABFMS), an anti-slavery organization that founded interracial colleges in the United States. However, disagreements arose within the Amherstburg Baptist Association (ABA) over this affiliation, leading to a split. Churches that maintained their affiliation with the ABFMS formed the CASBA. Member churches included congregations from Dawn, Chatham, Buxton, Colchester, London, Mount Pleasant, and Detroit. By the 1860s, the organization merged with the Amherstburg Baptist Association and consisted of over one thousand members.

=== Objectives ===
The primary objectives of CASBA were to advocate for the abolition of slavery and support anti-slavery initiatives, provide religious instruction and establish churches to serve the spiritual needs of Black communities, and assist in the development of Black settlements in Canada West. Churches affiliated with CASBA were often stops along the route of the Underground Railroad.

== Notable people ==
- Duke William Anderson (presiding officer of CASBA) – Later became first Black Justice of the Peace in the United States.
- Anthony Binga Jr. (ordained by CASBA) – Minister, educator, and businessman in the United States
- Samuel H. Davis (served as CASBA voting member) – Minister and chairman of the National Convention of Colored Citizens of America
- William P. Newman (served as CASBA board secretary) – Preacher, newspaper editor, and abolitionist
