= ToonSeum =

Museum of cartoon art, Pittsburgh, United States

Coordinates: 40.44349°N 79.99647°W

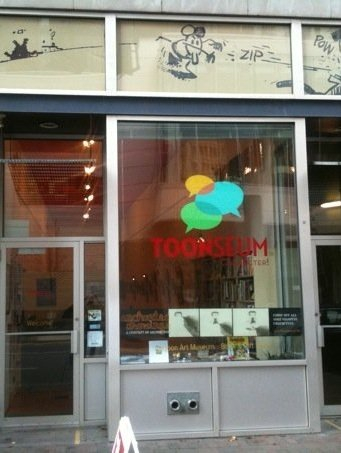
- Established: November 7, 2007
- Dissolved: February 24, 2018
- Location: 945 Liberty Ave., Pittsburgh, Pennsylvania, United States
- Founder: Joe Wos
- Director: John Kelly

The ToonSeum: Pittsburgh Museum of Cartoon Art was a museum devoted exclusively to the cartoon arts that was located in Pittsburgh, Pennsylvania. At the time of its operation it was one of three museums dedicated to cartoon art in the United States.

== History ==
The ToonSeum first opened in a small section of the Children's Museum of Pittsburgh in 2007. It moved to its own gallery space on Liberty Avenue in Pittsburgh's downtown Cultural District on November 8, 2009, aided by the Pittsburgh Cultural Trust. It was led by Joe Wos.

In 2009, the ToonSeum established its NEMO Award, given to notable individuals "for excellence in the cartoon arts". Recipients to date include veteran comic-book artist Ron Frenz, editorial and comic-strip artist Dick Locher, and comics artist, editorial cartoonist and artists' rights advocate Jerry Robinson.

In May 2013, the ToonSeum hosted the two-day North American Conference of the National Cartoonists Society. During that same month, plans for expansion of the museum were announced.

On February 16, 2018, the leadership of the ToonSeum announced via the organization's Facebook page that it would close the physical location on Liberty Avenue as of February 24, 2018, to focus on direct community outreach.

== See also ==
- Funky Turns 40: Black Character Revolution
