= Funky Turns 40 =

Funky Turns 40: Black Character Revolution (2012–2017) was an American traveling exhibition featuring animation artwork representing black characters from 1970s cartoons. It was compiled by co-curators Pamela Thompson and Loreen Williamson. The two women have collected more than 300 pieces of work related to classic cartoons and animated feature films; the traveling exhibition showcases 60 of these, including drawings, cels, posters, and storyboards.

The exhibition is presented by the Museum of Uncut Funk, an online museum created by Pamela Thomas. The retrospective was shown at the ToonSeum in Pittsburgh; the Schomburg Center for Research in Black Culture in New York City; and DuSable Museum of African American History in Chicago, The traveling exhibition continued circulating in museums around the U.S.; in May 2016 it was on display at the Black History Museum and Cultural Center of Virginia. The tour was expected to end in 2017.

== Background ==
Before the 1970s, theatrical cartoons either did not include black characters, or represented them in a stereotypical and derogatory manner. During the 1960s, the larger studios began to edit out these characters, and many cartoons were removed from television altogether an outcome of the civil rights movement.

During the 1970s television cartoon shows began to include positive black characters with whom black children could identify, potentially shifting attitudes of both black and white children. These role models for black children imparted messages of responsibility, education, family values and friendship. These characters were often made deliberately bland so as to be non-controversial. For the first time, shows appeared in which the characters were predominantly black, and in which development of the animation from concept to production was led by black people, including Bill Cosby and Berry Gordy.

Thompson and Loreen Williamson chose cartoons for the Funky Turns 40: Black Character Revolution exhibition from these cartoons from the 1970s and documented the struggle for positive portrayal of black people "from stereotypes to superheroes" on television. Animation is not a subject commonly covered by museums, and had previously been overlooked by museums portraying the social and cultural history of the civil rights movement; Thompson and Williamson worked to convince curators of the importance their retrospective in documenting struggles and aspects of the decade.

== Featured studios ==
The studios that produced the artwork from the animated cartoons that are being exhibited in Funky Turns 40 are:

- CBS/Fox Video (Our Friend Martin)
- Charles M. Schulz (Peanuts)
- Don Cornelius Productions (Soul Train)
- Farmhouse Films (I am the Greatest: The Adventures of Muhammad Ali)
- Filmation (Fat Albert, Mission: Magic!, Star Trek: The Animated Series, The Hardy Boys, U.S. of Archie, Space Sentinels, Tarzan and the Super 7, The New Fat Albert Show)
- Hanna-Barbera (Harlem Globetrotters, Scooby's All-Star Laff-A-Lympics, Scooby's All-Stars, Captain Caveman and the Teen Angels, Casper and the Angels, Josie and the Pussy Cats, Josie and the Pussy Cats in Outer Space, Where's Huddles, All New Super Friends Hour, Hong Kong Phooey)
- Paramount Pictures (Bebe's Kids)
- Rankin/Bass Productions (Jackson 5ive, Kid Power)
- Ruby-Spears (The Plastic Man Comedy/ Adventure Show)
- Schoolhouse Rock! (Multiplication Rock, Verb: That's What's Happening)
- Sesame Street (Billy Jo Jive)

== Catalogue ==
The exhibition has a 49-page catalogue that features a statement from the curators, the historical overview and importance of the exhibition, several character and animation timelines, and mention of key studios and fun facts.
