= Daniel Webster Davis =

American educator, minister, and poet (1862–1913)

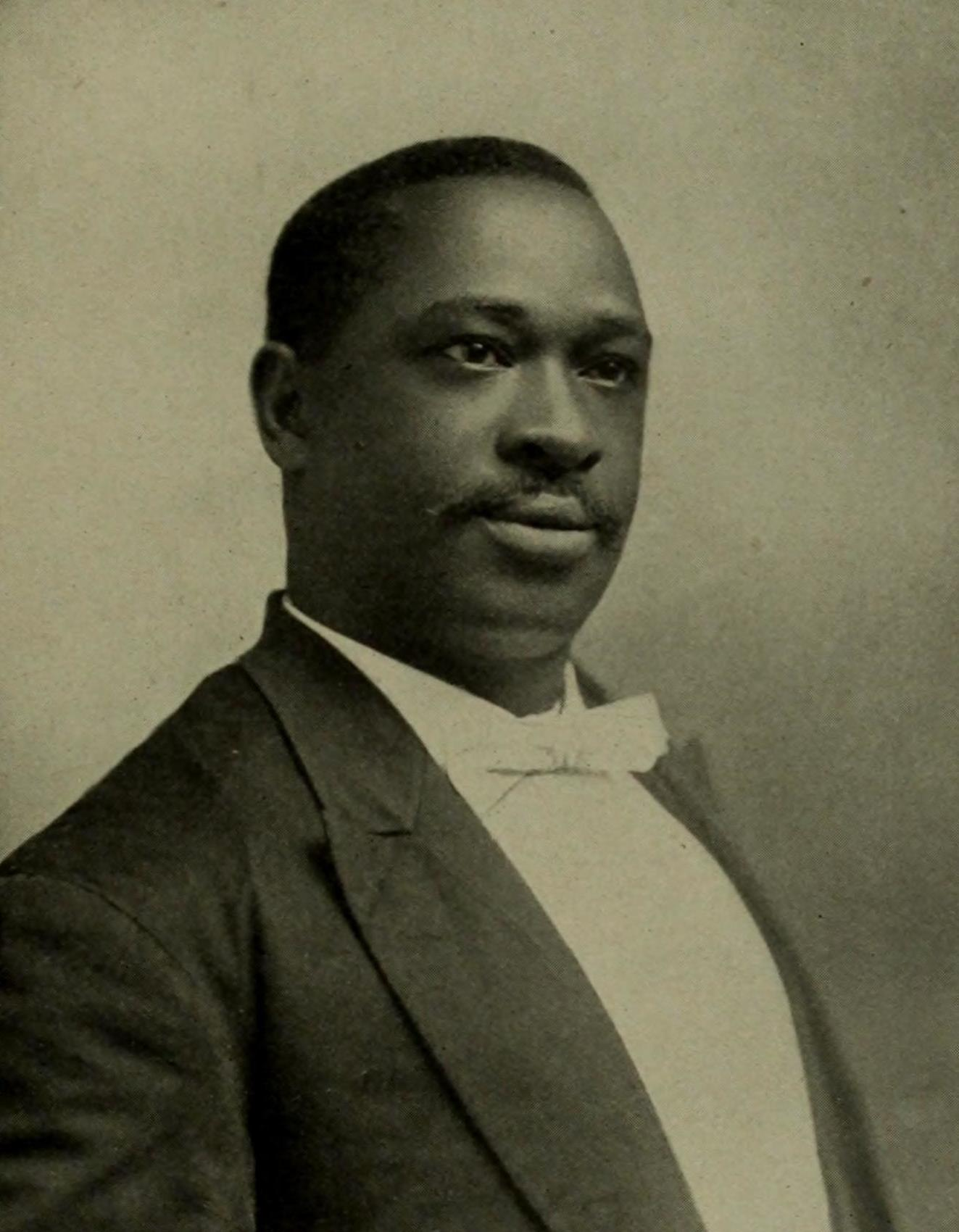
- Daniel Webster Davis circa 1902
- Born: March 25, 1862; Virginia
- Died: October 25, 1913 (aged 51); Richmond

Daniel Webster Davis (March 25, 1862 – October 25, 1913) was an American educator, minister, and poet. He taught and ministered in Richmond, Virginia, and became a popular author and speaker, going on several speaking tours around the United States and Canada. He also published two volumes of poetry that have received mixed critical assessment; some scholars have criticized him for perpetrating stereotypes of African Americans while others have argued that he was as radical as he could have been in his era.

== Biography ==
Daniel Webster Davis was born in Caroline County, Virginia, or Hanover County, Virginia, on March 25, 1862, to Randall or John Davis and Charlotte Ann (Christian Davis), who were both enslaved. Davis generally went by Webster. He moved to Richmond, Virginia, while the American Civil War was ongoing or shortly after its end, with his mother. By this point, his father had died. Davis was educated in the Richmond public school system and eventually earned a high school degree from the Richmond High and Normal School, graduating with honors when he was sixteen in June 1878. He worked odd jobs for several years after graduation. The history professor John T. Kneebone writes that while Davis later said he had degrees from Guadalupe College (AM and DD), these were "probably honorary". He was involved in the foundation of the Garrison Lyceum, a literary society.

Davis began teaching in Virginia in 1879, at the Navy Hill School in Richmond, and continued to teach for over thirty years to his death. After four years he began teaching at the Baker Street School. Davis also spent some of his summers teaching and attending courses aimed at teachers. He also taught summer school in West Virginia and the Carolinas at times. In 1887 he was involved in the foundation of the Virginia State Teachers' Reading Circle, which Kneebone describes as "the first organization of African American educators in Virginia" and notes was one of several organizations that evolved into the Virginia Teachers Association.

He married Elizabeth Eloise Smith, a teacher at Baker Street, on September 8, 1893; the couple had six children, three of whom survived into adulthood. Around the time of his marriage, Davis entered the Lynchburg Baptist Seminary. On October 4, 1896, or in 1895, he was ordained as a Baptist minister and was pastor at the Second Baptist Church in South Richmond from July 1896 until his death, overseeing a growth in membership; according to a profile in The Virginia Magazine the congregation grew from thirty-two to five hundred while Davis was there. He also became a popular speaker around Virginia, and also spoke around the United States and even in Canada. In July 1900 Davis spoke at a Chautauqua assembly in Laurel Park, Massachusetts. That year he toured portions of the Northeastern United States and two years later gave a lecture series at the Hampton Summer Normal Institute.

Davis was also active in several other capacities in Richmond, including working with the Virginia Building, Loan and Trust Company, and Negro Development and Exposition Company, as vice president of both, on the governing board of Richmond's Society for Better Housing and Living, and several other organizations.

== Literary career ==
Davis edited The Young Men's Friend, a publication of the YMCA in Virginia, as early as 1891, and around that time edited the weekly Social Drifts. On October 21, 1895, Davis read a poem at the Atlanta Cotton States Exposition in the Negro pavilion. He contributed to publications including The Voice of the Negro and The Colored American Magazine.

Davis published two volumes of poetry, Idle Moments, Containing Emancipation and Other Poems (1895), and 'Weh Down Souf and Other Poems (1897). His first volume included 37 poems; the second was 21 republished and 21 new poems. Davis sought to attract the same readers that had given Paul Laurence Dunbar success around the same era with 'Weh Down Souf; its cover was drawn by William Ludwell Sheppard. In 1908 he published The Industrial History of the Negro Race of the United States with Giles B. Jackson. In 1910 he published a biography of William Washington Browne, Life and Public Services of Rev. Wm. Washington Browne.

== Death and legacy ==
Davis had fallen ill by 1910 and—though he went to Hot Springs, Arkansas, in hope of relief—he died on October 25, 1913, of chronic nephritis. Schools in Richmond teaching Black students closed for his funeral. The Richmond Planet described him as "one of the most prominent and influential colored men the South had ever produced."

Three schools in Virginia were named after Davis.

=== Critical assessment ===
Popular in his day, Davis saw wide publication of his work, particularly in African-American publications. The two dialect poems included in John Edward Bruce's Anthology of Negro Poetry were both written by Davis.

Davis's work, particularly his second volume of poetry, has been criticized as subscribing and perpetrating many stereotypes of African Americans. The anthology The Book of American Negro Poetry included two of his poems. Around two-thirds of his poems were written in African-American Vernacular English and a profile by the scholar Jean Wagner noted that it was hard to tell whether he was "completely sincere or [...] set out to win easy popularity from an audience whose demands were slight." It went on to describe him as the most conformist contemporary African-American poet and as writing with "scarcely any other concern than to flatter the white majority." Sterling Brown deemed him "the Negro Thomas Nelson Page." His work, both in publications and speeches, has been described as similar to Booker T. Washington's in adopting a "conciliatory" attitude to race relations. Dickson D. Bruce Jr. in 1992 described him as "the poet of accommodation."

However, some of his writing has been compared to that of W. E. B. Du Bois with a "mixed moderate-militant ideology". He often advocated for racial pride and rights. His profile in The Virginia Magazine argues that he was "as race proud and militant as a public utterance by a southern black man could be" in his era. Some of Davis's poems argued that white Americans would eventually be forced to pay for subjugating Black people and some of his speeches advocate in favor of Black voting rights and recognizing the progress of Black people in America.

== Bibliography ==
- Sherman, Joan R. (1974). Invisible poets; Afro-Americans of the nineteenth century. Urbana, University of Illinois Press. ISBN 978-0-252-00325-7.
- Bruce, Dickson D. Jr. (August 1, 1992). Black American Writing from the Nadir: The Evolution of a Literary Tradition, 1877–1915. LSU Press. ISBN 978-0-8071-1806-1.
- Green, Hilary (April 1, 2016). Educational Reconstruction: African American Schools in the Urban South, 1865–1890. Fordham Univ Press. ISBN 978-0-8232-7013-2.
