= First Battalion Virginia Volunteers Armory =

Historic building in Virginia, US

- U.S. National Register of Historic Places
- Virginia Landmarks Register
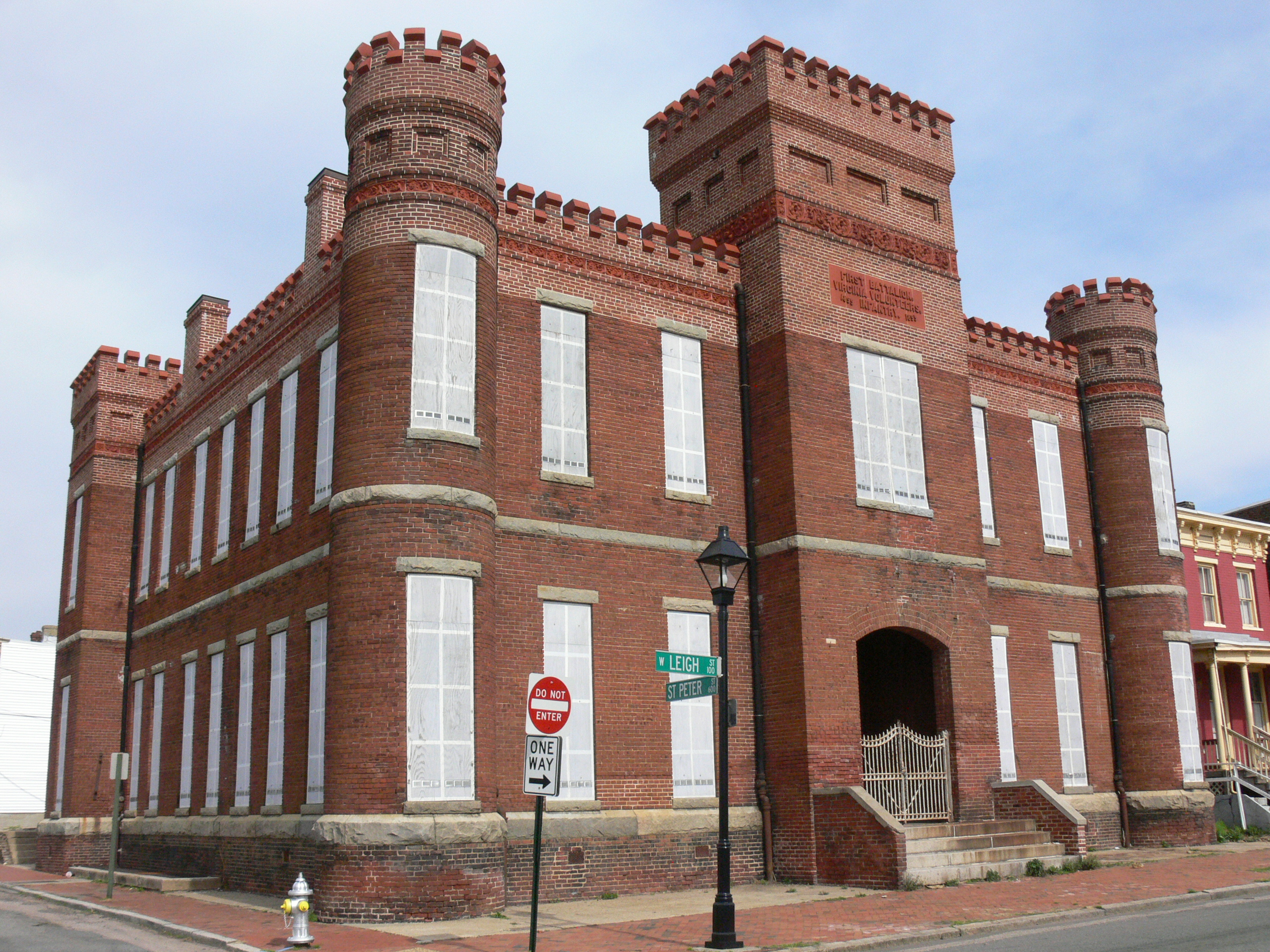
- First Battalion Virginia Volunteers Armory, March 2011

- Location within Virginia Location within the United States
- Location: 122 W. Leigh St., Richmond, Virginia
- Coordinates: 37°33′0″N 77°26′30″W
- Area: less than one acre
- Built: 1895
- Architect: Cutshaw, Wilford Emory
- Architectural style: Late Victorian
- NRHP reference No.: 09001158
- VLR No.: 127-5676

Significant dates
- Added to NRHP: December 23, 2009
- Designated VLR: September 17, 2009

First Battalion Virginia Volunteers Armory, is a historic armory building located in Richmond, Virginia. It was built in 1895, and is a two-story. Late Victorian style brick structure. It also is known as the Leigh Street Armory, the Monroe School, and the Monroe Center.

It features four brick towers, two circular turrets, a rectangular tower over the center front entrance, and a square tower, with crenellation along the roof parapet. The interior was rebuilt after a fire in 1985, and a 1940s gymnasium removed in 1998. The building originally housed the armory for an African-American militia company until 1899. It then housed a school for African-American children until World War II, when it again was used as a reception center for servicemen of color. It returned as a school for African-American children until 1954 and desegregation. For a period it housed The Black History Museum of Richmond. It is the oldest of three identified African-American armories in the country. It is currently home to the Black History Museum and Cultural Center of Virginia, which finished construction in May 2016.

It was listed on the National Register of Historic Places in 2009.
