= William Lee Taylor =

American minister, bank president, farmer (1854–1915)

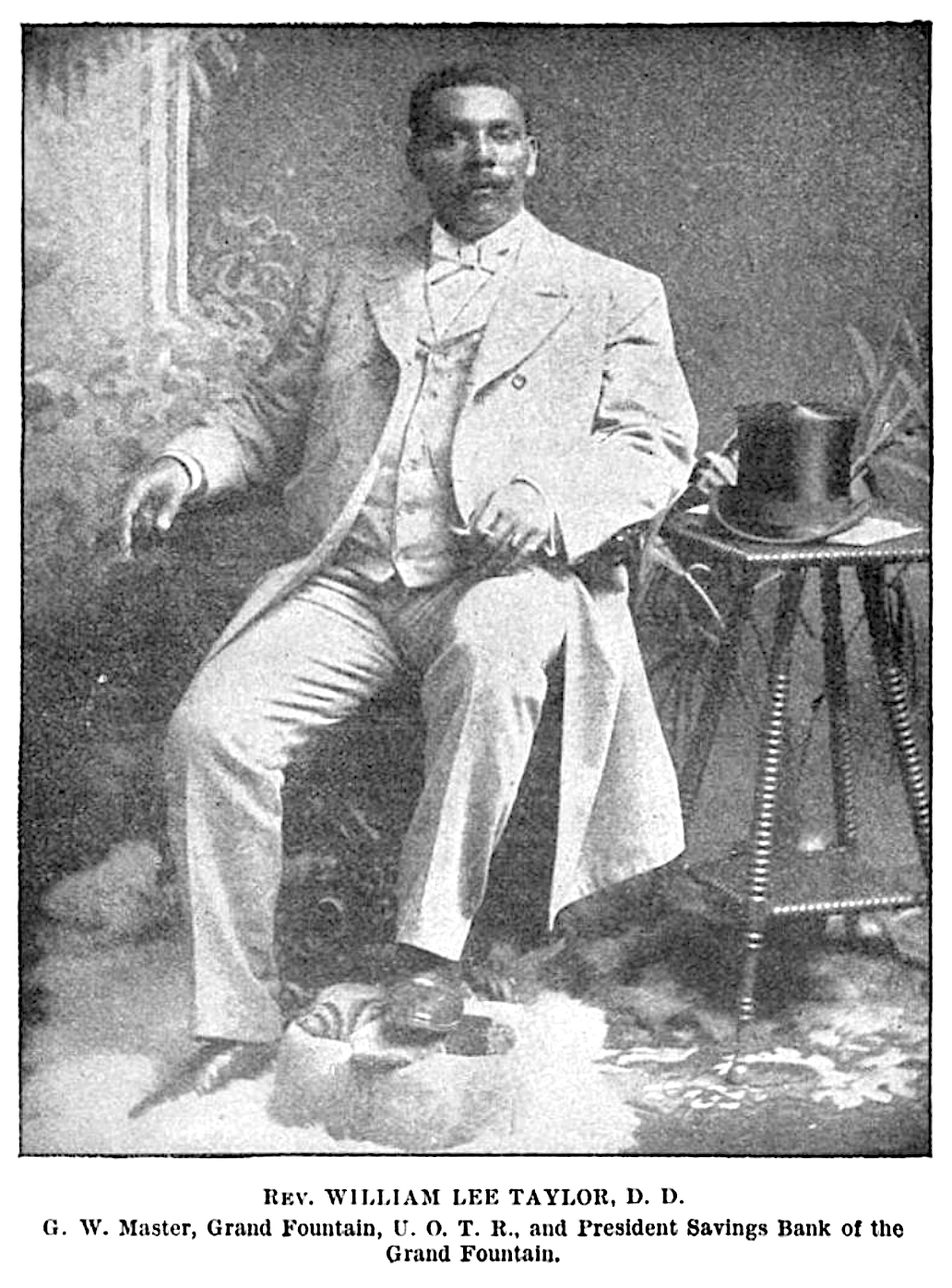
- Born: 1854; Caroline County, Virginia, U.S.
- Died: January 27, 1915 (aged 60–61); Boswell, Virginia, U.S.
- Education: Richmond Institute
- Occupations: Bank president, Baptist minister, teacher, farmer
- Spouse: Rachel Waller (m. 1875–)
- Children: 9

William Lee Taylor (1854 – January 27, 1915), also known as W. L. Taylor, was an American bank president, Baptist minister, teacher, and farmer in Virginia. He served as the Grand Master of the Grand Fountain United Order of True Reformers (or simply True Reformers) in Richmond, Virginia. He was on the executive committee of Booker T. Washington's National Negro Business League.

== Early life and education ==
William Lee Taylor was born enslaved in 1854, in Caroline County, Virginia. After the American civil war ended in 1865, Taylor worked as a farming contractor for the next few years. This was followed by work on the Chesapeake and Ohio railroad, initially as a "cart boy" and then as a cook. He left the railroad after an injury.

Taylor took an interest in the Baptist religion and in the Ebenezer Baptist Church in Richmond, where he worked as a clerk.

He attended the Richmond Institute (now Richmond Theological Institute) for three years.

In 1875, Taylor married Rachel Waller in Caroline County, Virginia. Together they had 9 children.

== Career ==
Taylor was called to the pastorate of Pleasant Grove Baptist Church, and served for 2 years. The next nine years were spent serving the Mount Zion Baptist Church in Louisa County, Virginia, and in 1893 he moved to Jerusalem Baptist Church in Doswell, Virginia.

Taylor began working with the True Reformers in 1888. In 1891 he was made Vice Grand Master of the True Reformers, and by 1897 he was named the Grand Master of the organization, and served multiple terms. Taylor was the president of the True Reformers Savings Bank. After the True Reformers Banks (in Richmond and Washington, D.C.) opened in April 1889, the volume of business was more than $16 million US dollars. The bank collapsed in 1910 after an embezzlement scandal and several large loan defaults occurred.

Taylor was on the executive committee of the National Negro Business League, founded by Booker T. Washington.

== Death and legacy ==
He died on January 27, 1915, in his home in Boswell, Virginia.

The former W. L. Taylor Mansion (1907) at 526 North Second Street in the Jackson Ward neighborhood of Richmond, Virginia was a Queen Anne-style twenty-six-room home, and it was turned into a restaurant in 1918, and later used as a commercial space for the Elks Club. It was designed by architect John A. Lankford.
