= Giles Beecher Jackson =

American entrepreneur, newspaper publisher, civil rights activist (1853–1924)

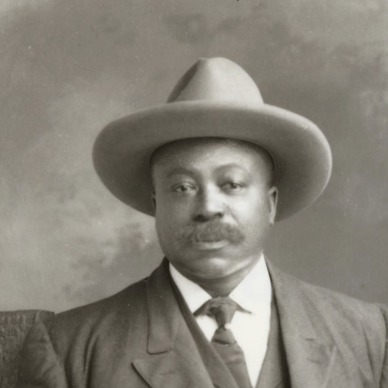
- Born: September 10, 1853; Goochland County, Virginia, U.S.
- Died: August 13, 1924 (aged 70); U.S.
- Resting place: Evergreen Cemetery, Richmond, Virginia, U.S.
- Other name: Giles B. Jackson
- Occupations: Lawyer, entrepreneur, newspaper publisher, civil rights activist
- Spouse(s): Sarah Wallace (married, 1874–?)

Giles Beecher Jackson (1853–1924) was an American lawyer, newspaper publisher, entrepreneur, and civil rights activist. He was the first African-American to practice law before the Supreme Court of Virginia in 1887. Jackson co-authored The Industrial History of the Negro Race in Virginia (Virginia Press, 1908).

== Early life and education ==
Giles Beecher Jackson was born on August 13, 1853, in Goochland County, Virginia; he was African American and enslaved from birth.

Jackson moved to Richmond, Virginia after he was freed and worked as a servant. After working as a law clerk for William H. Beveridge in Richmond, Jackson decided to study law. Beveridge tutored him and encouraged his law studies.

== Career ==
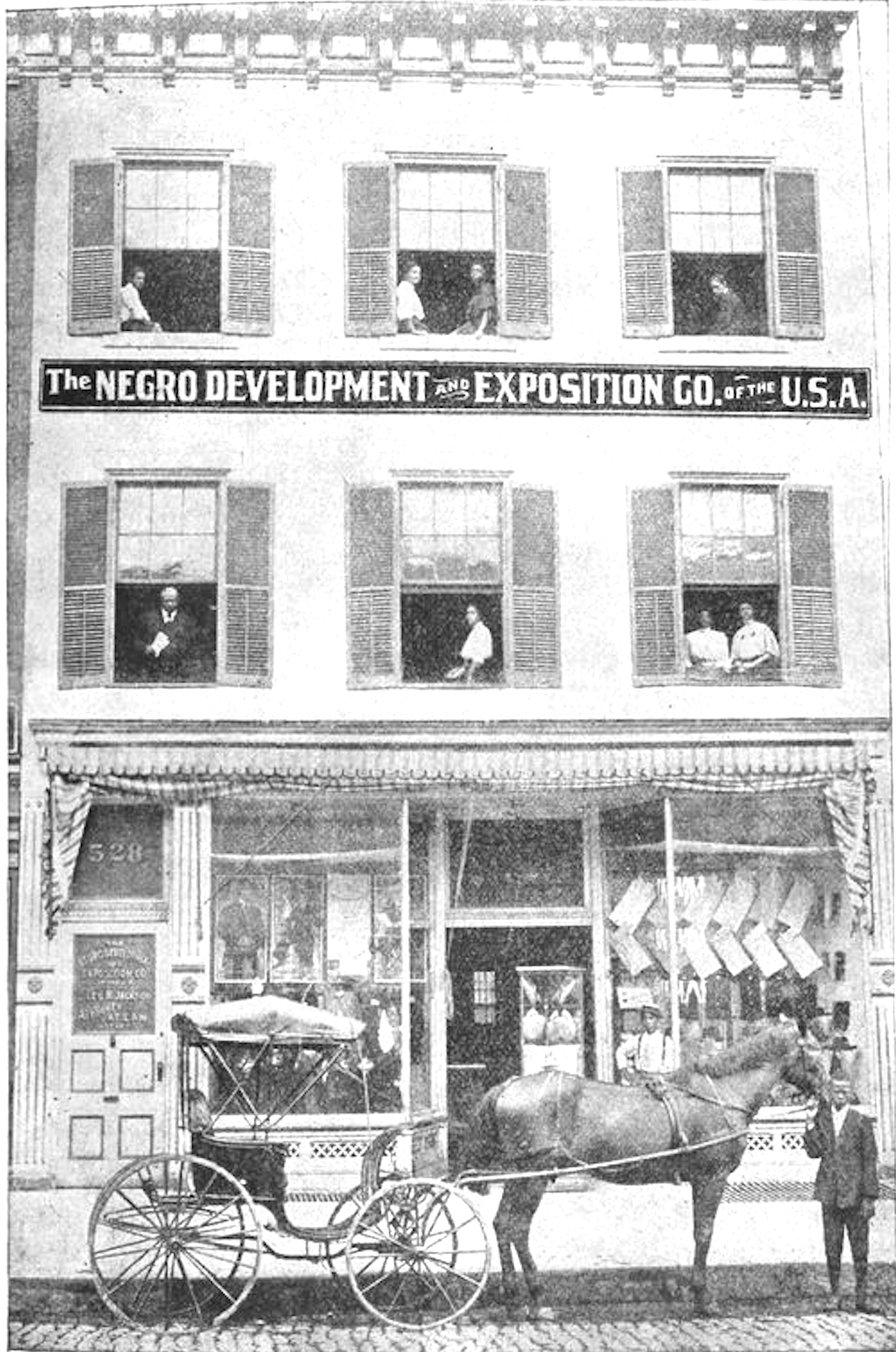
The Negro Development and Exposition Co. (1911) in Jackson Ward

In 1887, Jackson practiced law before the Supreme Court of Virginia, making him the first African American to do so. In 1888, he helped found a bank affiliated with the United Order of True Reformers, an organization that started in Richmond as a temperance group, and expanded to other states into a business and Black fraternal society. In 1900, he became an aide to his mentor, Booker T. Washington, who had recently had founded the Boston National Negro Business League. He owned and edited the Negro Criterion, a weekly newspaper from Richmond.

In 1901, President Theodore Roosevelt had awarded Jackson with the title of honorary colonel of the third civic division (an all-Black cavalry unit), with Jackson participating in the presidential inaugural parade along Pennsylvania Avenue.

Starting in 1903, Jackson found the Negro Development and Exposition Company (NDEC) headquartered in Richmond’s Jackson Ward. The NDEC was attempting to capitalize on the display of African American achievements, with the goal of creating the first national museum.

Jackson was a leader in the formation of the Negro Department (1907) at the Jamestown Exposition (also known as the Jamestown Ter-Centennial Exposition of 1907), and he had helped fundraise and obtained a grant from the United States Congress. The exhibition had received a mixed reception, with criticisms of the exhibition highlighting Black achievements in order to further enforce racial segregation. Jackson felt having the exhibition in a separate "Negro Building" allowed for a greater variety and completeness of presentation, and that it could better highlight their achievements. The book The Industrial History of the Negro Race in Virginia (Virginia Press, 1908) authored by Jackson and Webster was focused on the Negro Building at the Jamestown Exposition and Black achievement.

In 1914, Jackson was appointed as Chief of the Negro Division of the United States Employment Service, an agency that helped find work for unemployed unskilled laborers.

== Death and legacy ==
He died on August 13, 1924, and is buried in Evergreen Cemetery in Richmond.

In 2007, the Virginia Department of Historic Resources erected a historical marker in Jackson's honor in the Jackson Ward neighborhood. In 2021, Richmond Mayor Levar Stoney proclaimed April 17 as "Giles B. Jackson Day" for all his accomplishments, and it was awarded on the 150th anniversary of the historic Jackson Ward neighborhood.

Giles Jackson-related images

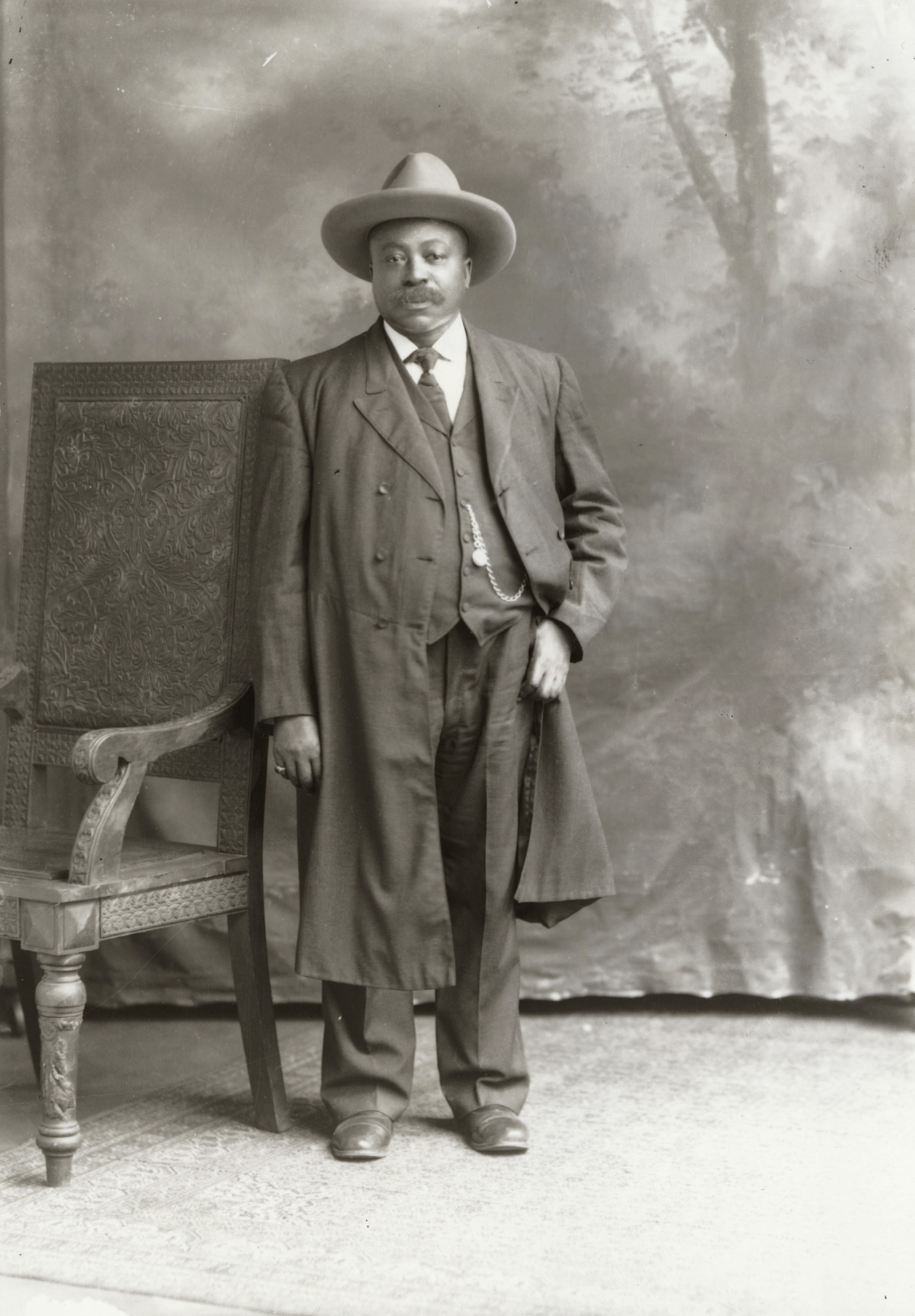
Jackson, c. 1911

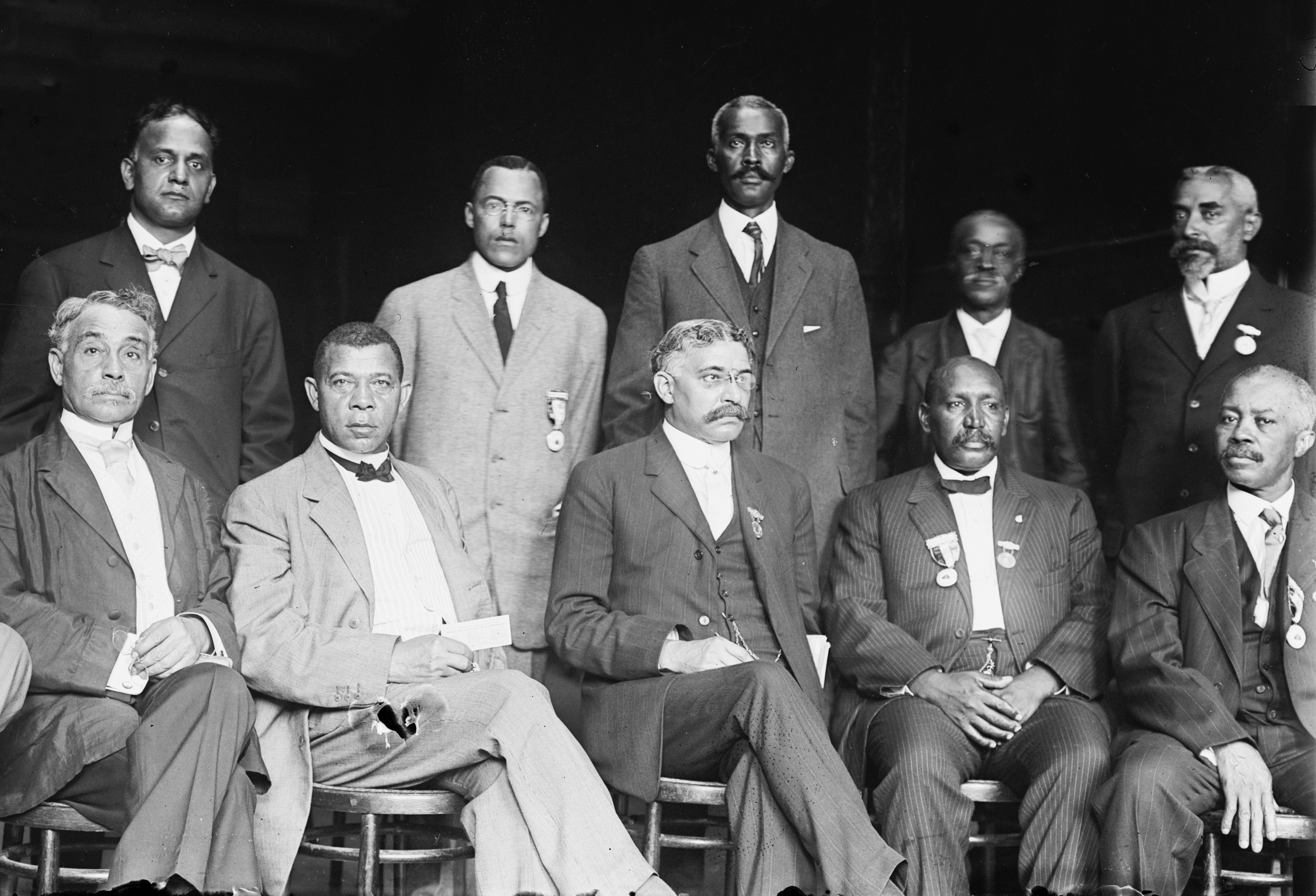
Executive Committee at the National Negro Business League

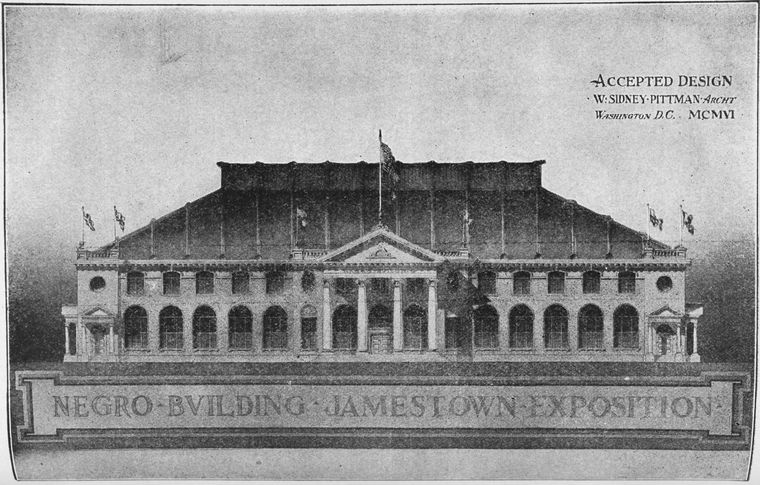
Negro Building at the Jamestown Exposition (1907)

== Publications ==
- Jackson, Giles B.; Davis, D. Webster (1908). The Industrial History of the Negro Race in Virginia. Virginia Press. ISBN 978-0-8369-8767-6.

== See also ==
- Daniel Webster Davis
- John Mitchell Jr.
