= George W. Blackwell =

American politician

George W. Blackwell was a lawyer and state legislator in Illinois.

Blackwell was born in Richmond, Virginia, the son of James Blackwell and Annie Estelle Jordan. He studied at Tuskegee University and Howard University School of Law. He moved to Chicago and served in the Illinois House of Representatives from 1929 to 1933.

He was a leader in the NAACP.

== See also ==
- List of African-American officeholders (1900–1959)
