= Janice Underwood =

American educator

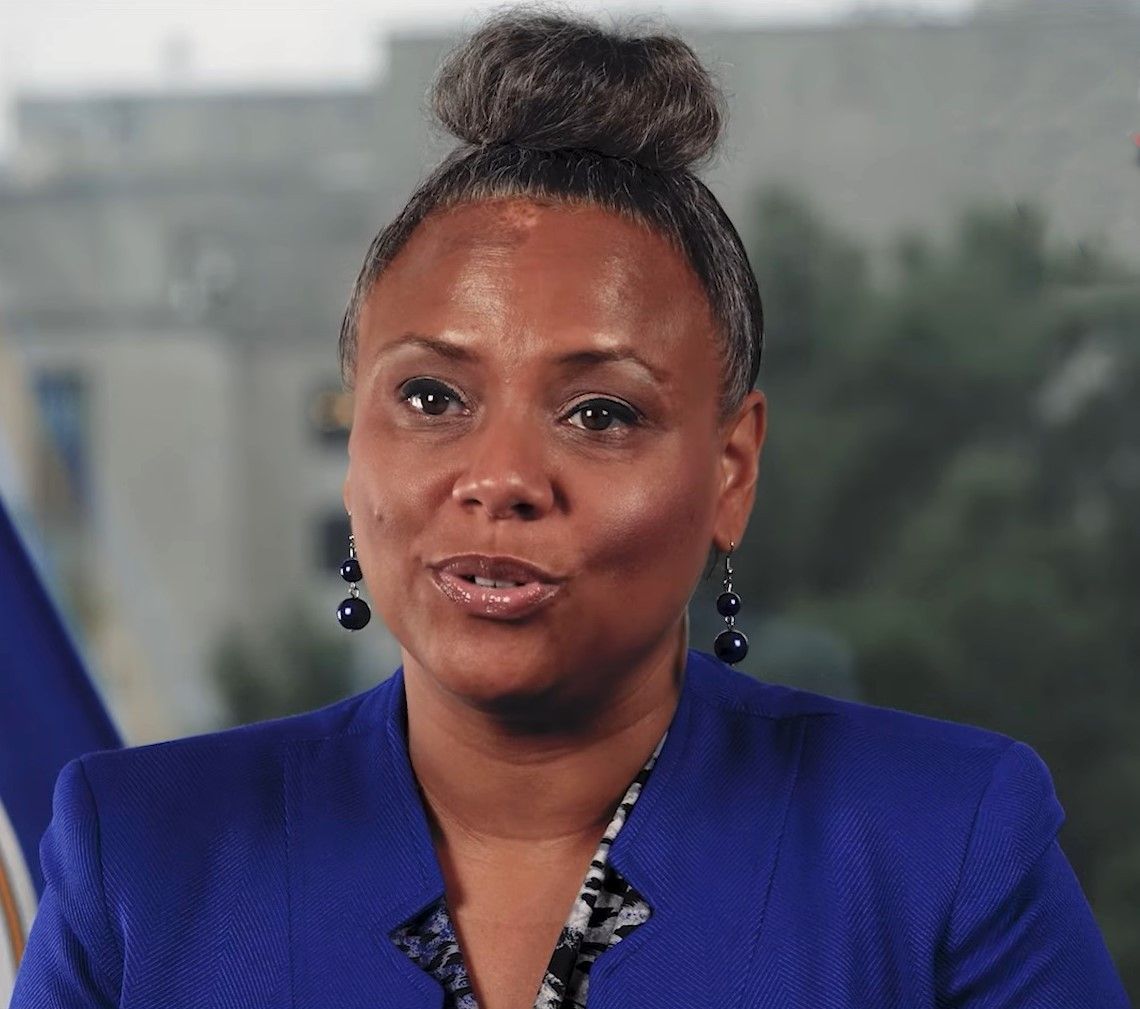
- Underwood in 2023
- Born: Janice Bell

Academic background
- Education: Hampton University; Old Dominion University

Academic work
- Discipline: Diversity, equity, and inclusion
- Institutions: Old Dominion University

Janice Bell Underwood is an American educator who was the first director of United States Office of Personnel Management's Office of Diversity, Equity, Inclusion, and Accessibility and the governmentwide chief diversity officer from 2022 to 2024. She is the vice president of diversity at Disney Experiences. Underwood was previously the first chief diversity officer of the Virginia state government from 2019 to 2022.

== Life ==
Underwood was born to Michael and Virginia Bell. She earned a B.A. (1998) in psychology and a M.A. in special education (2002) from Hampton University. She earned a Ph.D. in curriculum and instruction from the Darden College of Education at Old Dominion University (ODU). Her 2015 dissertation was titled, A Phenomenological Case Study Concerning Science Teacher Educators' Beliefs and Teaching Practices About Culturally Relevant Pedagogy and Preparing K-12 Science Teachers to Engage African American Students in K-12 Science. Sue C. Kimmel was her doctoral advisor.

Underwood was a biology special education teacher at Hampton High School from 2000 to 2015. In 2011, she joined her alma mater ODU as a research assistant and adjunct professor of science methodologies in the department of STEM and professional studies. At ODU, she served as an executive program director from 20015 to 2018 and director of diversity initiatives from 2018 to 2019. On September 16, 2019, Underwood became the first director of diversity, equity, and inclusion for the Virginia state government, having been appointed by named by governor Ralph Northam. In May 2022, Underwood was appointed as the first director of the United States Office of Personnel Management's Office of Diversity, Equity, Inclusion, and Accessibility and the governmentwide chief diversity officer. In 2024, she joined Disney Experiences as its vice president of diversity, equity and inclusion talent outreach and development.
