= Black History Museum and Cultural Center of Virginia =

Museum in Richmond, Virginia, US

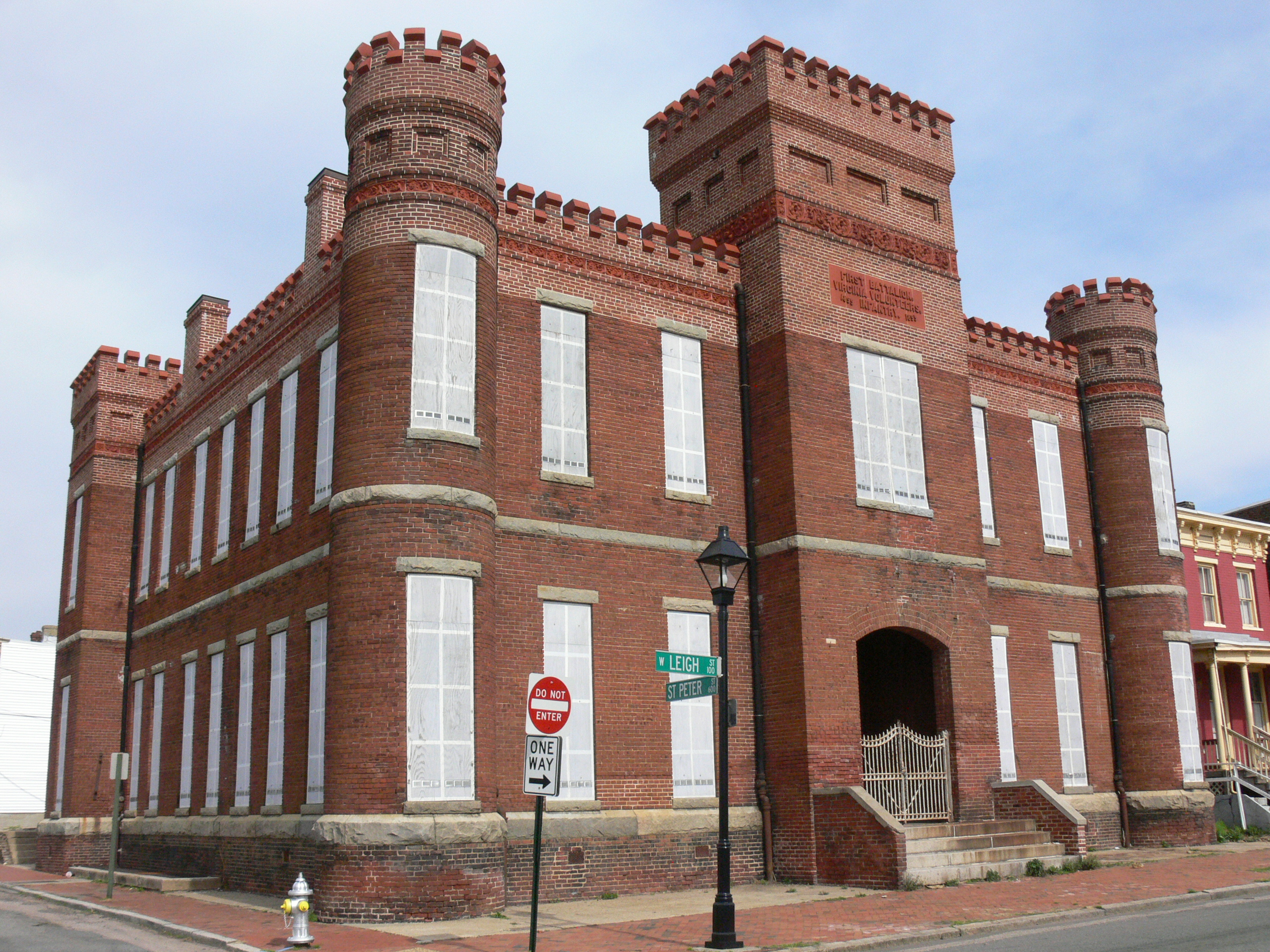

- Location within Virginia
- Established: 1981
- Location: 122 West Leigh Street, Richmond, Virginia, U.S.
- Coordinates: 37.550093°N 77.441446°W
- Type: Cultural history museum
- Founders: Carroll Anderson, Sr.
- Website: blackhistorymuseum.org

The Black History Museum and Cultural Center of Virginia (BHMVA) is an American 501(c)(3) organization and museum established in 1981 and focused on the history of Black and African Americans in the state of Virginia. It is located in the Leigh Street Armory building at 122 West Leigh Street in the Jackson Ward neighborhood of Richmond, Virginia.

== History ==
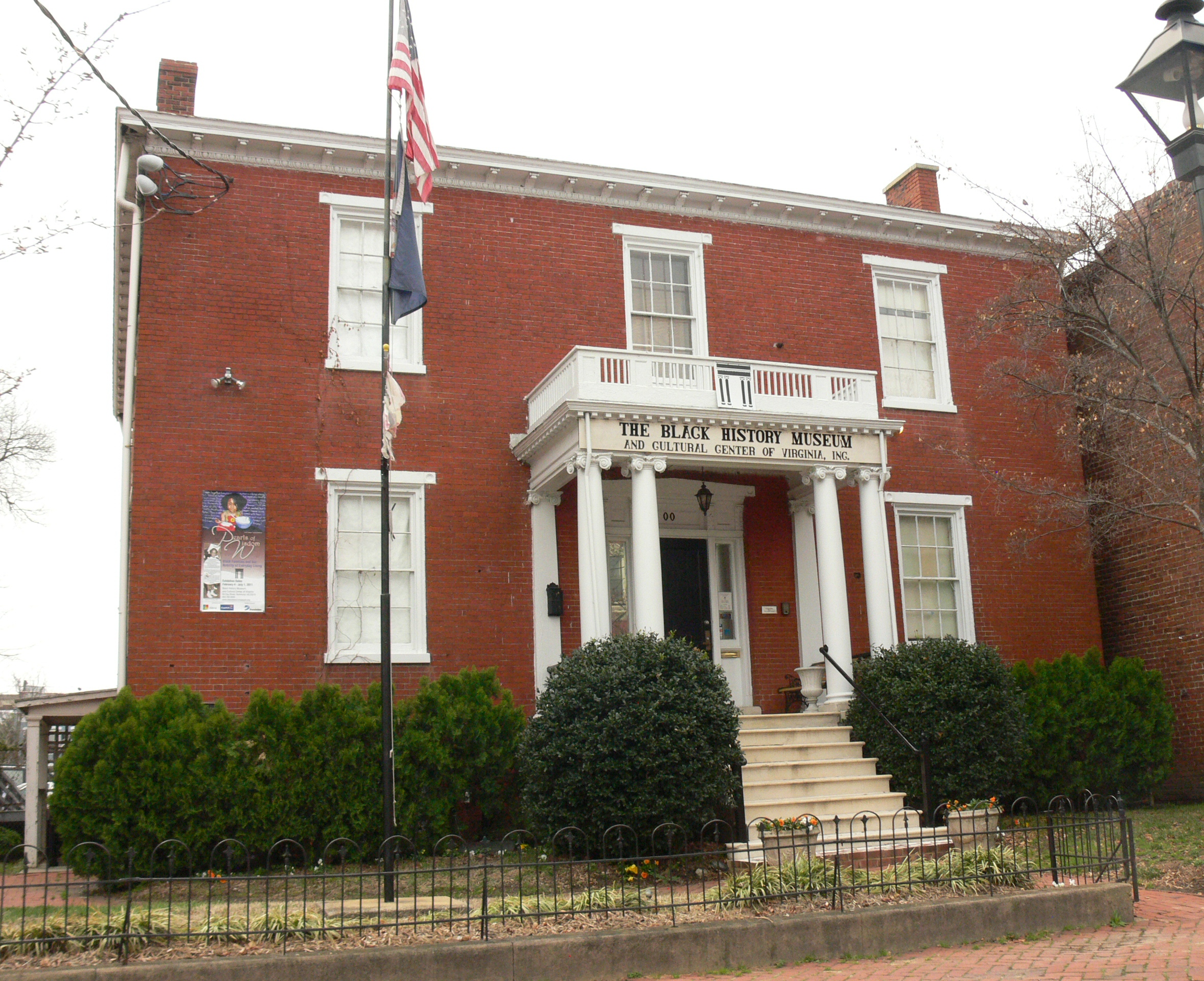
Former BHMVA location on 00 Clay Street, Richmond

The Black History Museum and Cultural Center of Virginia was founded by Carroll Anderson Sr. and opened to the public at 00 Clay Street in 1988, followed by a move in 2016 to 122 West Leigh Street. It is in a two-story building, and spans 12,000 square feet in size. The BHMVA has collaborated with the Valentine Museum and other local organizations for projects and exhibits. Former museum directors include Tasha Chambers.

The 2023 exhibit "Forging Freedom, Justice and Equality" celebrated the museum's 40th anniversary and reflected on 40 years of Black community stories and history, spanning into fields such as commerce, the arts, entertainment, and education. Other notable exhibitions at this museum include "Slavery at Jefferson's Monticello: Paradox of Liberty" (2020) about the enslaved people who built and supported the Monticello residency; and "Funky Turns 40: Black Character Revolution" (2016), about the history of Black cartoonists and animators.

In 2020, the city of Richmond transferred ownership of the fallen memorials (such as former Confederate States Army members) to the Black History Museum and Cultural Center of Virginia; it is now up to the institution to decide what to do with them.

== See also ==
- List of museums focused on African Americans
- List of museums in Virginia
- National Register of Historic Places listings in Richmond, Virginia
- Giles B. Jackson
