= Sesha Joi Moon =

Former Chief Diversity Officer of the United States Congress

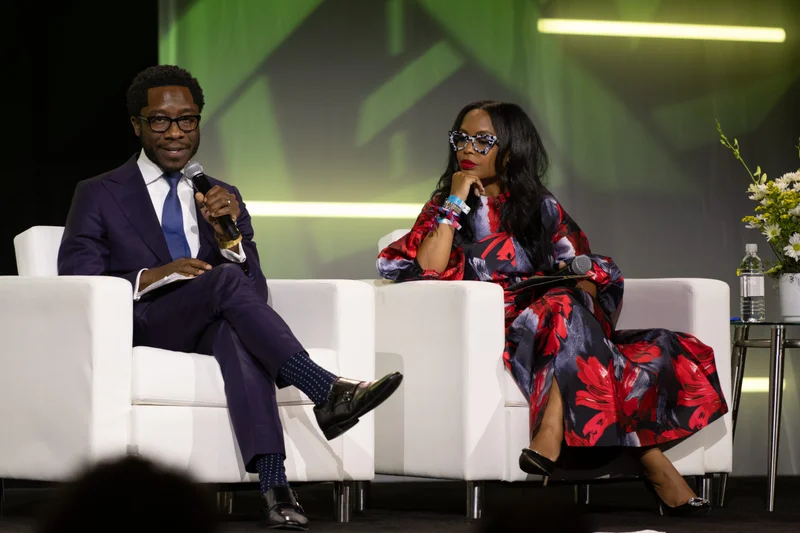
Moon with Michael Leach, White House Chief Diversity & Inclusion Officer, at the Global Black Economic Forum at the ESSENCE Festival of Culture in New Orleans, LA

Sesha Joi Moon (born September 20, 1983) is the Chief Diversity Officer and Director of Diversity, Equity, and Inclusion for the Commonwealth of Virginia, where she serves as a Cabinet Secretary at the pleasure of Governor Abigail Spanberger. She previously served as the Chief Impact Officer for Girl Scouts of the USA and was appointed as Chief Diversity Officer of the U.S. House of Representatives by Speaker Emerita of the House Nancy Pelosi, where she served as Director of the U.S. House Office of Diversity and Inclusion during the 117th and 118th Congresses.

Axios named her and her sister, Enjoli Moon, as the second "Most Powerful Richmonders of 2022" and she was named "Top 40 Under 40" by Style Weekly in 2023.

== Early life ==
Moon was born in Richmond, Virginia. Her father, August Moon, born Alexander Randolph and also known as Mr. Wiggles, was a social activist and music producer. He is best known for producing "Seven Minutes of Funk" by The Whole Darn Family, which is one of the most sampled instrumentations in hip hop music and most notably referenced by Jay-Z on his debut studio album Reasonable Doubt. Her mother, Dr. Michon Moon, served as the Director of the Victim Witness Program for the Office of the Commonwealth Attorney's Office for the City of Richmond.

== Education ==
Moon attended Virginia Commonwealth University in her hometown, where she earned a M.S. from the L. Douglas Wilder School of Government & Public Affairs and B.A. in African American Studies. In 2023, she became the first Black queer woman to establish an endowment at her alma mater, known as the Dr. Sesha Joi Moon Endowed Scholarship, along with endowments in tribute to her maternal grandparents, George and Inez Jaudon Johnson, at nearby Virginia Union University and Virginia State University. Her family established the first endowment in the history of Richmond Public Schools with the August and Michon Moon Endowed Scholarship Fund. She also holds a Ph.D. in Public Administration & Urban Policy from Old Dominion University in Norfolk, Virginia.

== Career ==
Moon is a member of Delta Sigma Theta sorority and was appointed to the Commonwealth of Virginia's Criminal Justice Services Board by the 73rd Governor of Virginia Ralph Northam. She also serves as co-founder of The JXN Project, a grantee of the Andrew W. Mellon Foundation's "Monuments Project" and recipient of the American Association for State & Local History's 2022 Leadership in History Award. As part of the project, she is featured in a forthcoming film titled "Declarations of Independence" by PBS NPR VPM.
