= James C. Farley =

American photographer (1854-aft.1910)

James Conway Farley
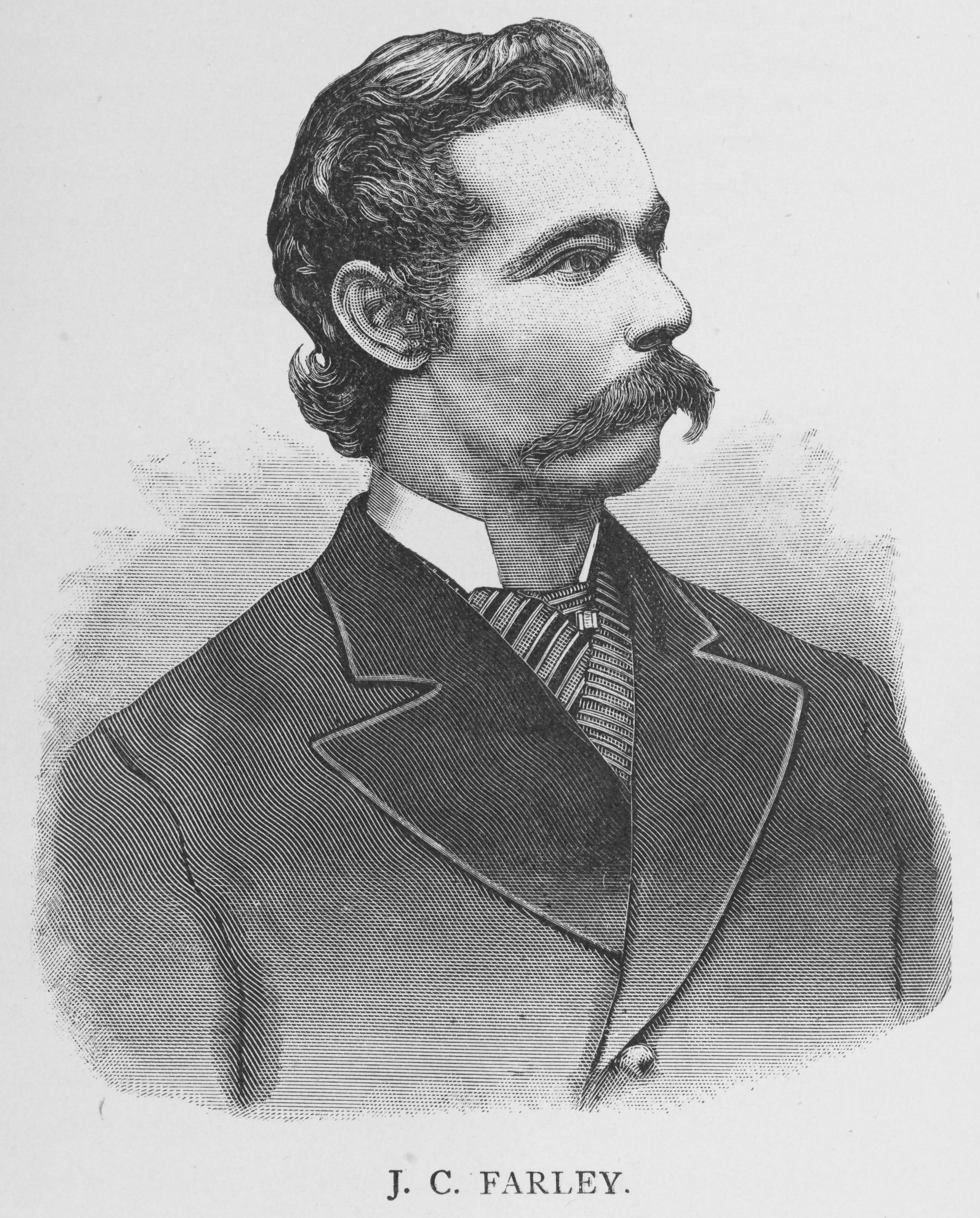
- Farley in 1887.
- Born: August 10, 1854; Prince Edward County, Virginia
- Died: aft.1910
- Occupation: Photographer

James Conway Farley (August 10, 1854 – after 1910) was a photographer in Richmond, Virginia. He was the proprietor of the Jefferson Fine Arts Gallery from 1895 into the 1900s. He is known as the first nationally recognized African-American photographer.

== Early life ==
James Conway Farley was born a slave in Prince Edward County, Virginia, on August 10, 1854. Both of his parents were slaves. In 1861 he moved with his mother to Richmond, Virginia in 1861, where she worked as a store-room keeper at the Columbia Hotel and he assisted in candle-making and learned to read. He later was apprenticed to the baker's trade, but quit and took work in the chemical department of the C. R. Rees photography company.

== Career ==
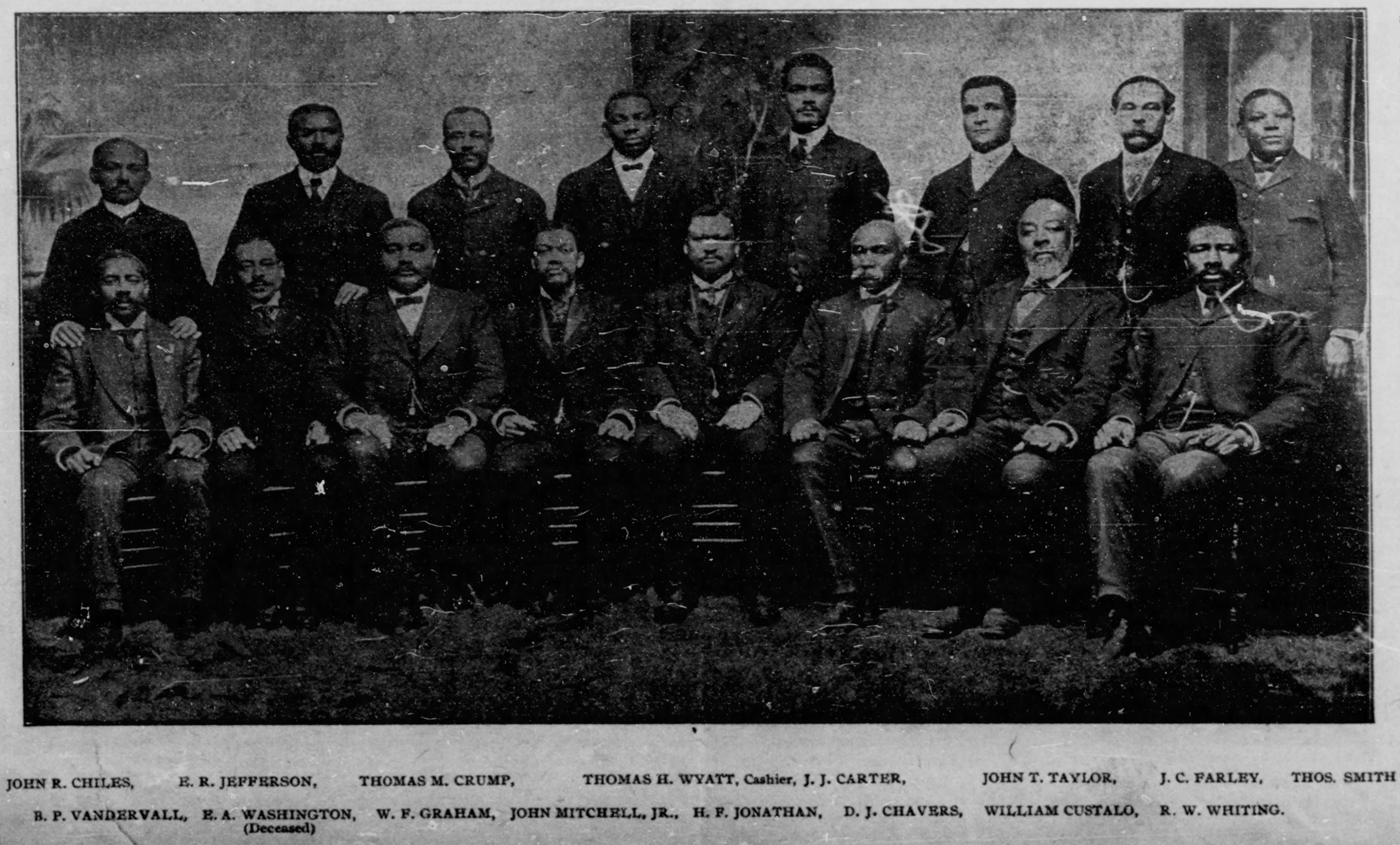
Mechanics Savings Bank Board of Directors, Farley is second from the right in the back row.

In May 1875, Farley became a photographer for G. W. Davis against the opposition of the other four employees, all of whom were white. Davis supported Farley and discharged the other four. The firm continued to have difficulty hiring white people, but Farley grew in skill and in 1879 was operator of the gallery. Farley's work was widely exhibited, including at the Colored Industrial Fair in Richmond in 1884, where he won a first prize, and the World Cotton Centennial in New Orleans in 1885. Farley left the Davis Gallery in 1895 to start his own establishment, the Jefferson Fine Arts Gallery. Farley was a member of the Knights of Pythias, Richmond Lodge No. 1. Farley was a delegate to the May 1902 Virginia Baptist State Convention where he spoke in favor of black businesses. Farley was a member of the board of directors of the Mechanics Savings Bank of Richmond led by Richmond Planet editor John Mitchell, Jr. in the 1900s. A number of Farley's photographs appeared in the Planet.

== Personal life ==
Farley married Rebecca P. Robinson of Amelia County, Virginia, on December 10, 1876. They had five children. Farley was also a deacon in the First Baptist Church in Richmond.

Farley lived until at least 1910, when he was residing in Jersey City, New Jersey.

== Legacy ==
Farley is known as the first black American to gain recognition as a photographer. Few of Farley's works survive, and one remaining is held in the Valentine Museum in Richmond.

== Gallery ==
1902 photographs in the Richmond Planet

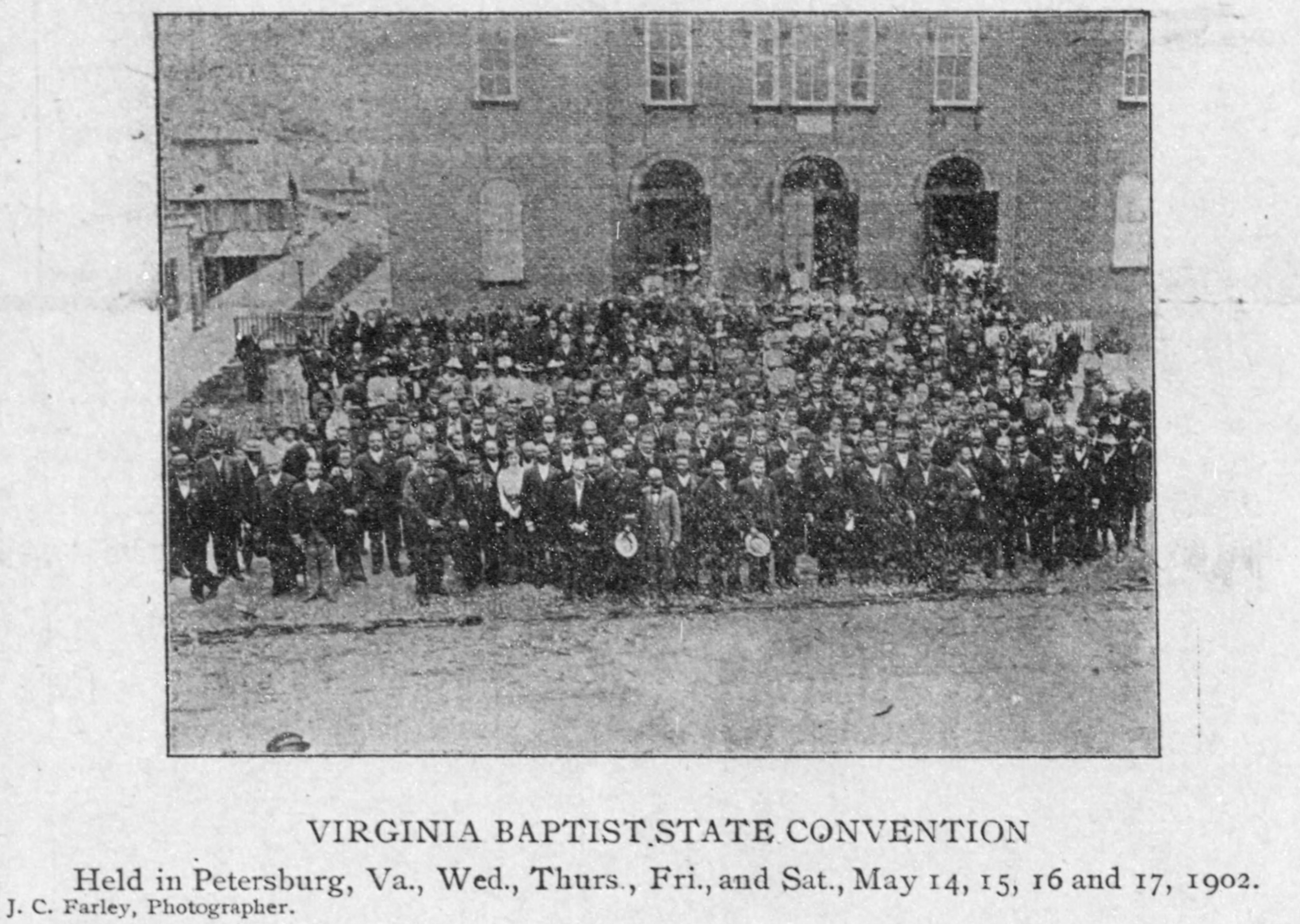
Virginia Baptist State Convention in 1902

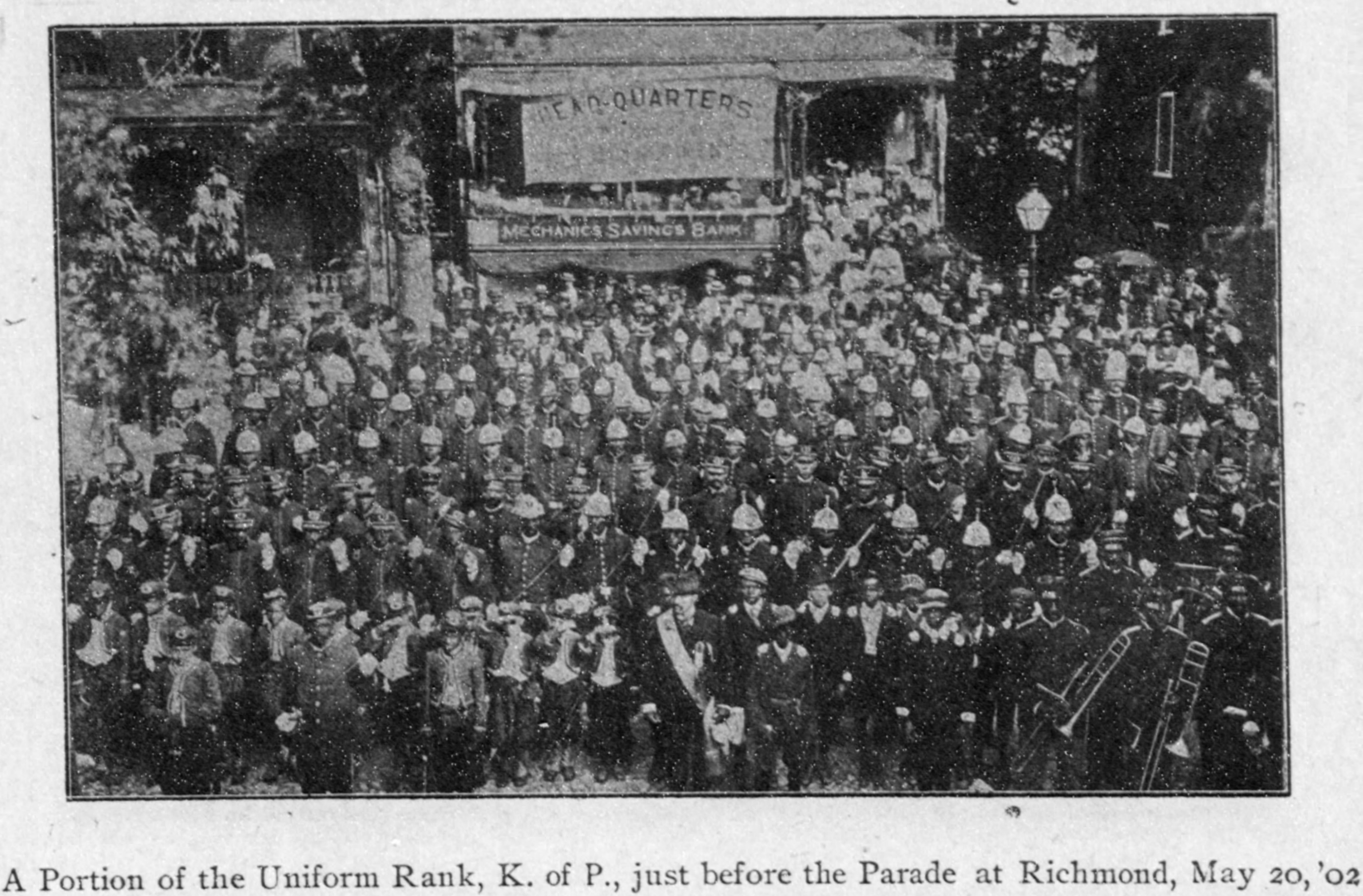
Image of the Richmond Knights of Pythias in front of the Mechanics Savings Bank taken by Farley on May 20, 1902.
