= Theodore W. Jones =

Canadian-born American businessman, politician (1853–1943)

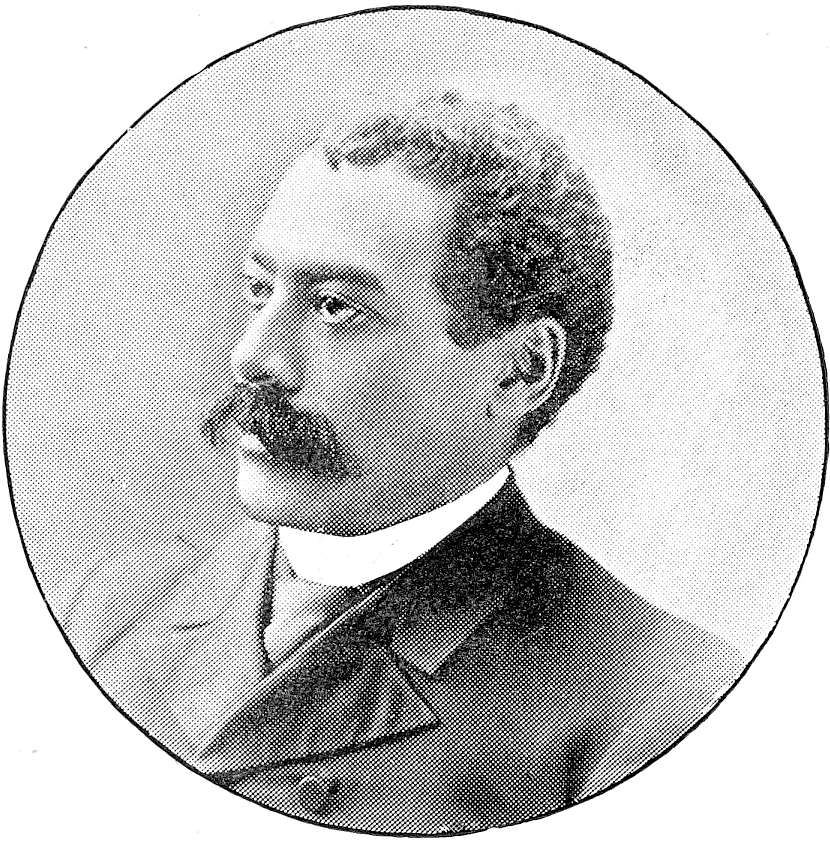

Cook County Commissioner
- In office 1895–1896

Personal details
- Born: Theodore Wellington Jones; September 19, 1853 Hamilton, Ontario, Canada
- Died: April 30, 1943 (aged 89) Richmond, Virginia, U.S.
- Resting place: Evergreen Cemetery, Richmond, Virginia, U.S.
- Party: Republican
- Spouse(s): Helen C. Lynthecom (m. 1882–1910; divorce), Marie M. Thomas (m. 1907–1943; his death)
- Children: 3
- Education: Wheaton College
- Occupation: Businessperson, newspaper editor, politician, community leader

Theodore Wellington Jones (September 19, 1853 – April 30, 1943) was a Canadian-born American businessman, newspaper editor, and politician. He was a Cook County Commissioner in 1895–1896, and member of the National Negro Business League and the Negro Historical and Industrial Association. Jones played a pivotal early role in African-American political participation in Chicago. He also went by T. W. Jones, and Ted Jones.

== Early life and education ==
Theodore Wellington Jones was born on September 19, 1853, in Hamilton, Ontario, Canada, to parents Hannah Maria (née Tate) and John Jones. He attended public schools in Hamilton. In childhood he moved with his family to Lockport, New York, and in 1865 they moved to Chicago. By the age of 15, Jones was driving an express wagon (a type of horse-drawn vehicle).

Jones attended Wheaton College in Wheaton, Illinois for three years.

== Career and family ==
=== Chicago ===
Jones owned a brick storage warehouse in Chicago. He founded T. W. Jones Furniture Transit Company in Chicago, which operated for 40 years. He was also the head of Jones Transfer Company and Jones Motor Car Company.

Jones married Helen C. Lynthecom in 1882, and together they had three children.

In 1895–1896, Jones was a Cook County Commissioner. He was a member of the Republican Party, and the second African-American to be elected to the commission.

Jones worked as the treasurer and managing editor of the Chicago Daily Leader newspaper starting in 1897.

He was a charter member of Angelus University, founded in 1897 by the Methodist Episcopal Church, it was a short-lived institution located in Los Angeles, California.

Jones was a member of the National Negro Business League, and in 1901 he had organized a new branch of the organization in Chicago. During the Second Annual National Negro in Business Convention in Chicago on August 21, 1901, Jones spoke to the audience and asked the question, "can the Negro succeed as a businessman?" Jones suggested that Black-owned businesses could prosper by solely focusing on serving the Black community.

=== Marital issues ===
In September of 1907, Jones had traveled to North Dakota to attempt to file divorce from his first wife Helen on grounds of "cruelty" in three different courts, all the cases were thrown out of the courts. On December 25, 1907 in Topeka, Kansas, Jones married his secretary Marie M. Thomas from Richmond, Virginia. By March 1908, he faced a bigamy charge in Shawnee County, Kansas, which made national news. Meanwhile Jones and his second wife Marie had bought expensive property in the all-white neighborhood of Governor's Row (or Governor's Square) in Topeka, Kansas, which was part of a series of ongoing lawsuits with his first wife.

In 1908, Jones was arrested for bigamy. His first wife Helen Jones shot him in the leg in 1911 in Chicago, as a result of their ongoing issues, however he was not seriously injured, and the multiple court filings took two years to finish.

=== Richmond, Virginia ===
In later life Jones left Chicago, to moved to Richmond, Virginia. He remained active in the local Black community, and continued to work in journalism, and politics after his move.

Jones served on the executive board of the Negro Historical and Industrial Association led by Giles Beecher Jackson in Richmond, Virginia. The Negro Historical and Industrial Association hosted the Richmond Negro Exposition of 1915, a celebration of the 50th anniversary of emancipation held at the Virginia State Fairgrounds in Richmond.

In 1933, William H. Stokes a retired pastor of the Ebenezer Baptist Church in Richmond sued Jones for libel. It was regarding something of the "libelous and insulting nature" which was published in the Richmond Planet newspaper, and Jones was the newspapers editor.

Jones helped form the Negro Political Club in 1940, in which he served as president. The club supported Democratic President Franklin D. Roosevelt and Vice President Henry A. Wallace.

== Death ==
Jones died at age 89 after a long illness on April 30, 1943, at his home at 1401 West Leigh Street in Richmond, and was interred in Evergreen Cemetery in Richmond.
