= James H. Holmes =

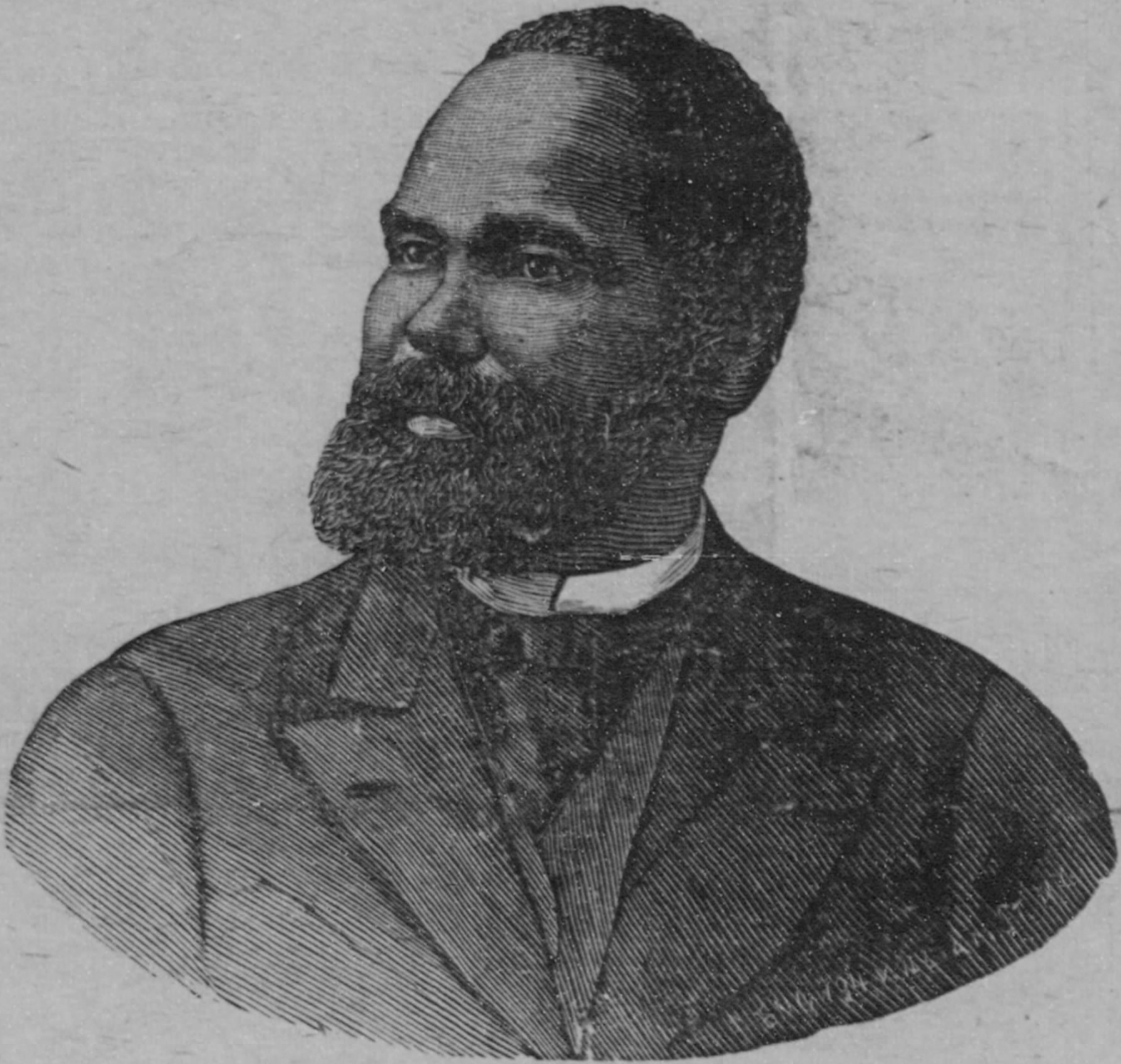
- Holmes in 1897
- Born: December 9, 1826; King and Queen County, Virginia, U.S.
- Died: November 25, 1900 (aged 73); Richmond, Virginia, U.S.
- Education: Shaw University
- Occupation: Minister

Religious life
- Religion: Baptist

James H. Holmes (December 9, 1826 - November 25, 1900) was a Baptist minister in Richmond, Virginia. As pastor of Richmond's First African Baptist Church, he was the leader of one of the largest churches in the country.

== Early life ==
James Henry Holmes was born a slave in King and Queen County, Virginia on December 9, 1826 to Dellphia and Claiborne Holmes, slaves on the plantation of Judge James M. Jefferies. Holmes had 15 siblings and worked as a cowboy on the farm.

In 1835 he was hired out to Samuel S. Myer's tobacco factory in Richmond, Virginia. In 1842 he was baptized into the Baptist religion by Rev. Robert Ryland at the First Baptist church of Richmond. In April 1846 he married a daughter of John Smith. When Smith and his wife escaped on the Underground Railroad to Massachusetts, he wrote a letter to his daughter. The letter fell into the wrong hands and Holmes was charged with planning to escape himself. Holmes was imprisoned and then bought by a slave trader named Silas O'Mahundro. He remained in jail for twelve weeks and was sold in 1848 to a New Orleans man named Pipkin.

When he moved to New Orleans, he left a wife and two children in Richmond. In New Orleans he worked on the levee. When a steamer blew up at the wharf in 1849, many were killed and Holmes had an arm dislocated and suffered head injuries. In 1849 he joined the Second Baptist Church in New Orleans and in 1850 he was elected deacon. In 1851 he married a second wife.

== Move to Richmond ==
About that time, Mr. Pipkin committed suicide and when his daughter married, Holmes was sold to Royal Parrish. Parrish owned Holmes' wife in New Orleans. Parish moved to Richmond in the fall of 1852, bringing Holmes and his wife. In 1855, Parrish died. Around that time, Holmes was working at William Robinson's factory. Also in 1855, he was elected deacon of the First Baptist church in Richmond, where he had worshipped years before. He was deacon until 1865, and then served as church clerk. During the American Civil War (1861-1865), Holmes kept store for African American Richard Gregory, a grocer. In 1862, Holmes' wife died. He then bought himself from the widow of Royal Parrish, paying $1,800 in Confederate Dollars. He still owed $100 Confederate to the lawyer that drew the papers when the war ended and his freedom was assured.

== Career ==
In 1866 he was elected assistant pastor, and in 1867 pastor at the First African Baptist Church. In 1863 he married his third wife by whom he had seven children. His church grew by leaps and bounds and became one of the largest church in the country. In 1871 he baptized 600 people, in 1878 he baptized 1100. In 1876 the congregation built a new church costing $35,000 and installed an organ costing $2,500, which was the largest organ in any African American church.

Holmes was active in the community. He was an organizer and served as the first president of the Colored Home of Richmond formed to care for needy African Americans in the city. That year he was also elected an officer of the Educational and Historical Association of Virginia, an African American literary lyceum led by John W. Cromwell. Among his congregation was the first black woman to own a bank, Maggie L. Walker, who Holmes baptized in 1878. Holmes and Walker frequently worked together. He also served as president of the Colored Orphan Asylum. In 1898, Holmes was awarded an honorary Doctorate of Divinity by Shaw University.

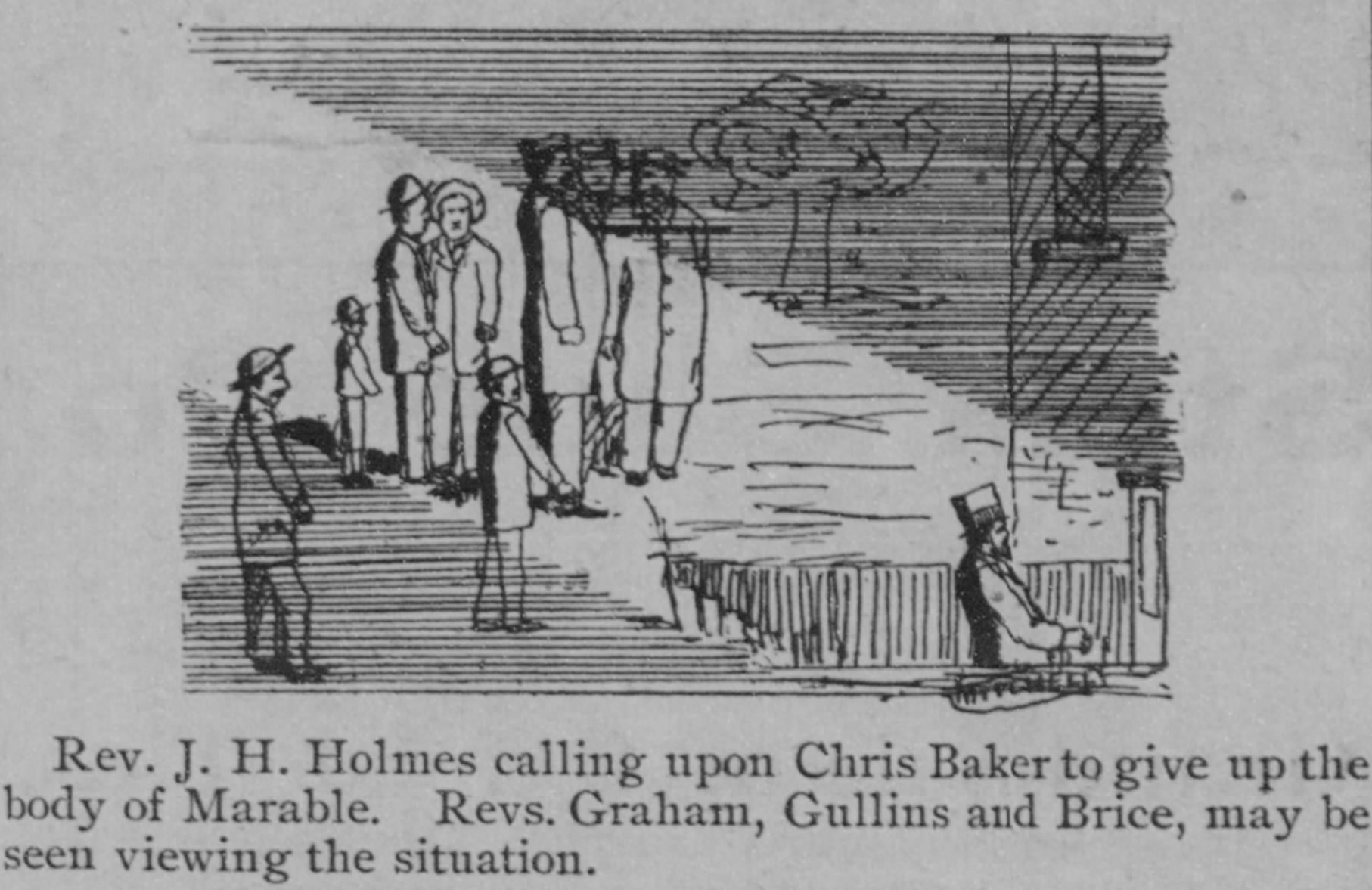
Rev J. H. Holmes pleads for body of Solomon Marable.

In 1896, Holmes appealed on the behalf of the widow of Solomon Marable for the return of his body after his execution and partial dissection by students at the Medical College of Virginia. The body had been legally seized by the College's janitor, Chris Baker. The case was subject to an exposé by Richmond Planet publisher John Mitchell, Jr.

== Later life ==
In 1896, his third wife, Maria Holmes, died. In about 1899 he married Susanna Watkins of Richmond. Holmes announced his retirement in October 1900. Holmes died the morning of Sunday, November 25, 1900 at his home at 1000 N. 4th St. in Richmond. His funeral was held at First Baptist Church and he was buried at Ham Cemetery. Rev. Holmes was re-interred in Woodland Cemetery in 1918.
