= Southern Aid and Insurance Company =

The Southern Aid and Insurance Company is an insurance company that was founded in 1893, 28 years after the end of the American Civil War, by a group of black men (American men of African ancestry) in Richmond, Virginia. The purpose was to furnish adequate and affordable insurance protection to African-Americans. The company was the first chartered insurance company organized by blacks in the United States and had the distinction of being the oldest black owned and operated insurance company in the nation. It was also the largest African-American insurance company in the United States at one time. The company's name was later changed to the Southern Aid Society of Virginia which was the forerunner of the Southern Aid Life Insurance Company that sold Life insurance.

The Company's first President was Z. D. Lewis (1859–1926).

The company wrote insurance for industrial life, accident and sick benefits insurance. They were licensed in New Jersey, Virginia and District of Columbia, and had offices in Alexandria, Bristol, Charlottesville, Danville, Farmville, Fredericksburg, Lynchburg, Newport News, Norfolk, Petersburg, Portsmouth, Richmond, Roanoke, Saluda, Suffolk, Winchester, Virginia; and Washington, D.C.

The insurance company purchased John Mitchell, Jr.'s Mechanics Savings Bank building on Clay Street in 1930. The bank had closed in 1922. In the late 1980s the building, at 212 E. Clay Street, and presumably the company itself, was bought by the Atlanta Life Insurance Company.
