= Bouey =

Bouey is a surname. Notable people with the surname include:

- Elizabeth Coles Bouey (1891–1957), American missionnary
- Gerald Bouey (1920–2004), Canadian economist
- Harrison N. Bouey (1849–1909), Liberian minister
