= Z. D. Lewis =

Baptist church leader and businessman (1859–1926)

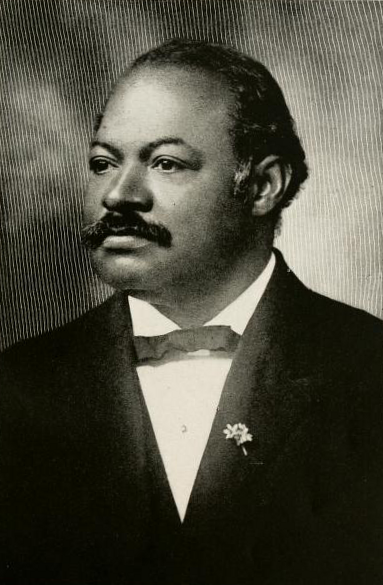
- Portrait of Lewis in a 1921 publication
- Born: Zachariah Dearborn Lewis; November 25, 1859; Perrowville, Virginia, U.S.
- Died: March 15, 1926 (aged 66); Richmond, Virginia, U.S.
- Resting place: Evergreen Cemetery; Richmond, Virginia, U.S.
- Education: Richmond Theological Institute
- Spouse: Ada McKinney (m. 1889)
- Children: 2

Zachariah Dearborn Lewis (November 25, 1859 – March 15, 1926) was an influential Baptist church leader and the first president of the Southern Aid and Insurance Company based in Richmond, Virginia.

== Early life ==
Zachariah Dearborn Lewis was born on November 25, 1859, in Perrowville, Virginia, to Maria (née Walker) and Reazin Lewis. His father was a local Baptist preacher. At a young age, his family moved to Lynchburg and he worked in a tobacco factory. He attended elementary and high school in Lynchburg. He graduated from the Richmond Theological Institute (later the Virginia Union University).

== Career ==
At the age of 20, Lewis converted to Baptism. In 1883, he was licensed to preach by the First Baptist Church of Lynchburg. In 1884, he was ordained. He was pastor of Shady Grove Baptist Church in Orange County for four years.

Lewis was organizer and the first president of the Southern Aid and Insurance Company based in Richmond, Virginia. It was the oldest African American owned insurance company in the U.S. when it was acquired by another agency in 1977. The company wrote insurance for industrial life, accident and sick benefits insurance and was licensed in New Jersey, Virginia and District of Columbia, and had offices in Alexandria, Bristol, Charlottesville, Danville, Farmville, Fredericksburg, Lynchburg, Newport News, Norfolk, Petersburg, Portsmouth, Richmond, Roanoke, Saluda, Suffolk, Winchester, Virginia; and Washington, D.C. Lewis was politically influential and became involved in leadership disputes within the African American Baptist community of Richmond.

Lewis was pastor of the Second Baptist Church of Richmond for 37 years. By 1921, he had grown the membership from 800 to more than 2,000. He was chosen by organizers of the insurance company to lead it. In 1898, he delivered what Lucy Coles would describe as a fiery speech opposing her attempt to collect funds for a mission building in Liberia. Coles was a prominent American missionary and the mother of Elizabeth Coles Bouey. Lewis was at the time moderator of the Richmond Minister's Conference. He was president of the Baptist General Association of Virginia for seven years. He was a member of the board of trustees of the Virginia Union University and director of the St. Luke Bank and Trust Company. He was vice president of the St. Luke Penny Savings Bank. He was grand lecturer of the Love and Charity Organization and served as the editor of the Love and Charity Messenger journal. He was a member of the executive board of the Lott Carey Baptist Foreign Mission Convention. He was secretary of the Shiloh Association for 20 years.

== Personal life ==
Lewis married Ada McKinney of Richmond on July 2, 1889. They had two children, Zachariah D. Jr. and Hattie. He died on March 15, 1926, at his home at 202 East Leigh Street in Richmond. He was buried at Evergreen Cemetery in Richmond.
