= Carl Ruehrmund =

German-American architect (1855–1927)

- Born: Carl August Ruehrmund; September 22, 1855; Berlin, Germany
- Died: October 25, 1927 (aged 72); Richmond, Virginia, U.S.
- Resting place: Hollywood Cemetery
- Occupation: Architect

Carl August Ruehrmund (September 22, 1855 – October 26, 1927) was a German-born architect who worked briefly in Germany and then immigrated to the United States, establishing a successful practice and legacy in Richmond, Virginia.

== Biography ==
Carl August Ruehrmund was born on September 22, 1855, in Berlin, Germany. He studied architecture and engineering at the Royal Academy in Berlin. He began his career working on German government projects before immigrating to the United States in 1881. Ruehrmund came to Richmond around 1882 to oversee the remodelling of the Central Post Office. He worked with Albert Lybrock in Richmond before Lybrock's death in 1896.

Ruehrmund was the father of Max Ruehrmund and uncle of architect Carl Linder and developer Charles Phillips. He and his firm produced a large number of residential, commercial, religious and public buildings. He married Rosa R. Heiss in 1883. She died in 1916. They had three sons and three daughters, Charles F., Max E., Paul L., Mrs. William D.S elden, Mrs. Robert I. Mayo and Mrs. Roger K. Gilbert. Max Ernst Ruehrmund (1891–1948) joined the firm which became Ruehrmund & Son in 1917.

Ruehrmund died on October 26, 1927, at his home on Roseneath Road in Richmond. He was buried in Hollywood Cemetery.

== Work ==
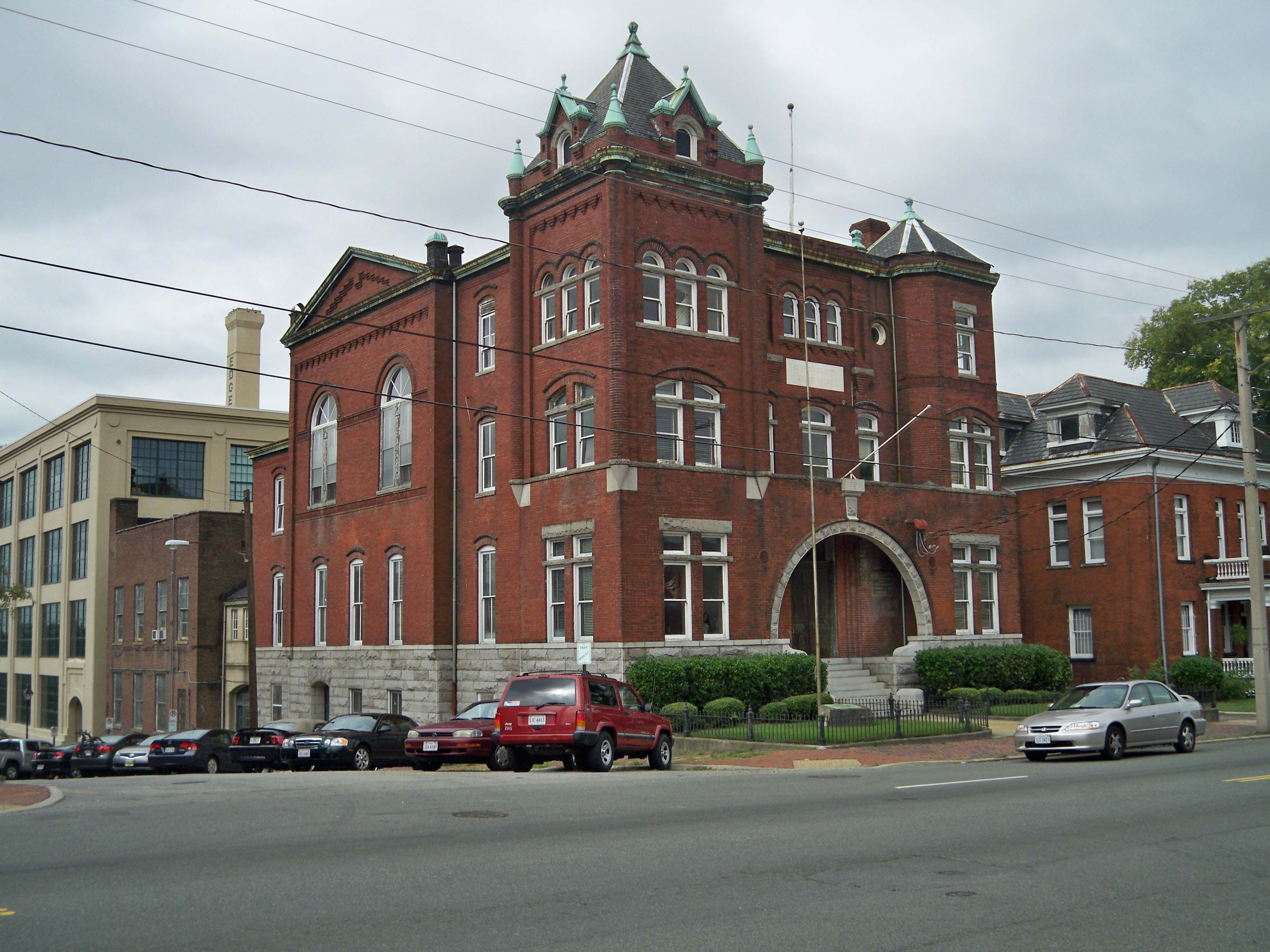
Henrico County Courthouse

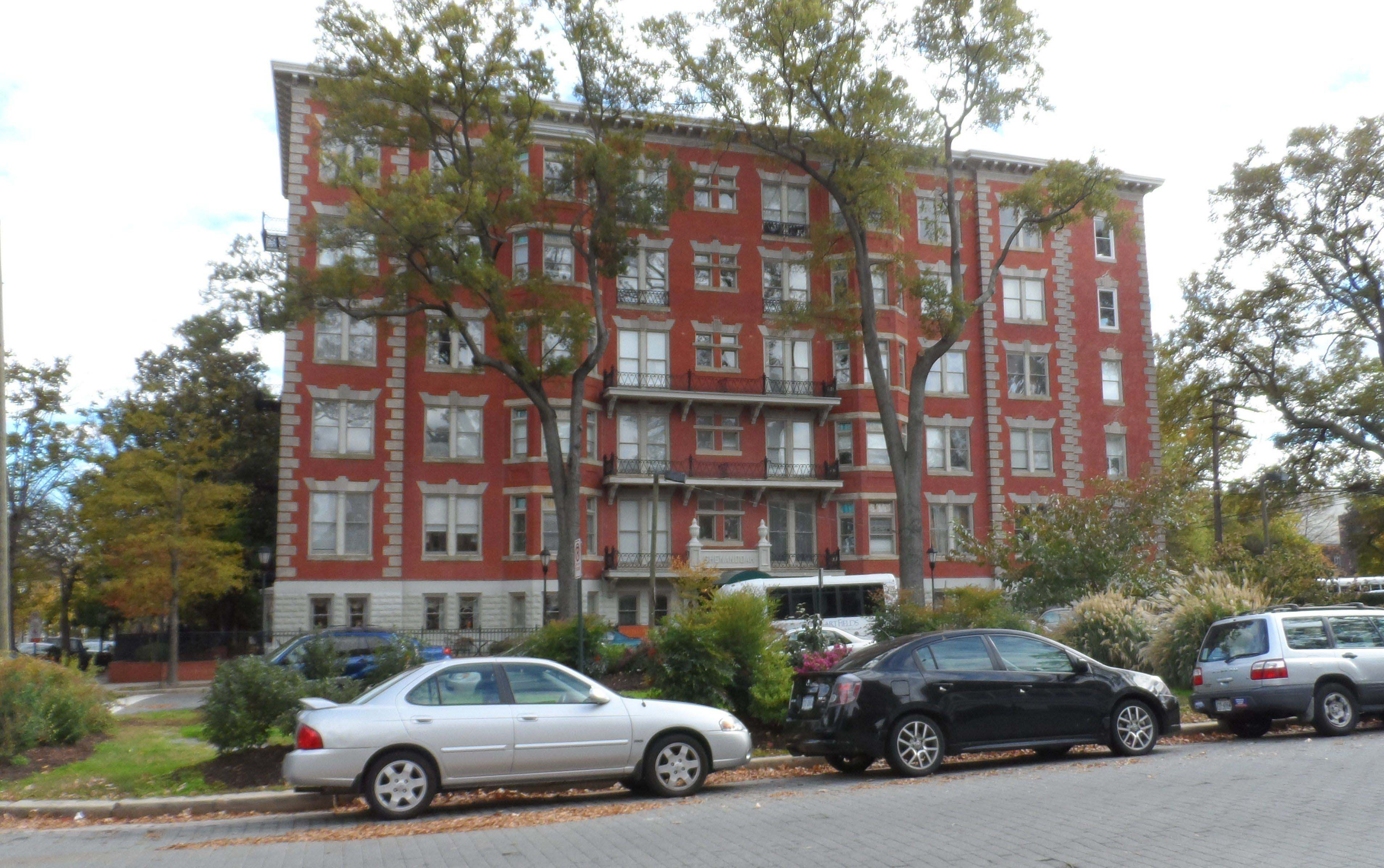
Shenadoah Apartments

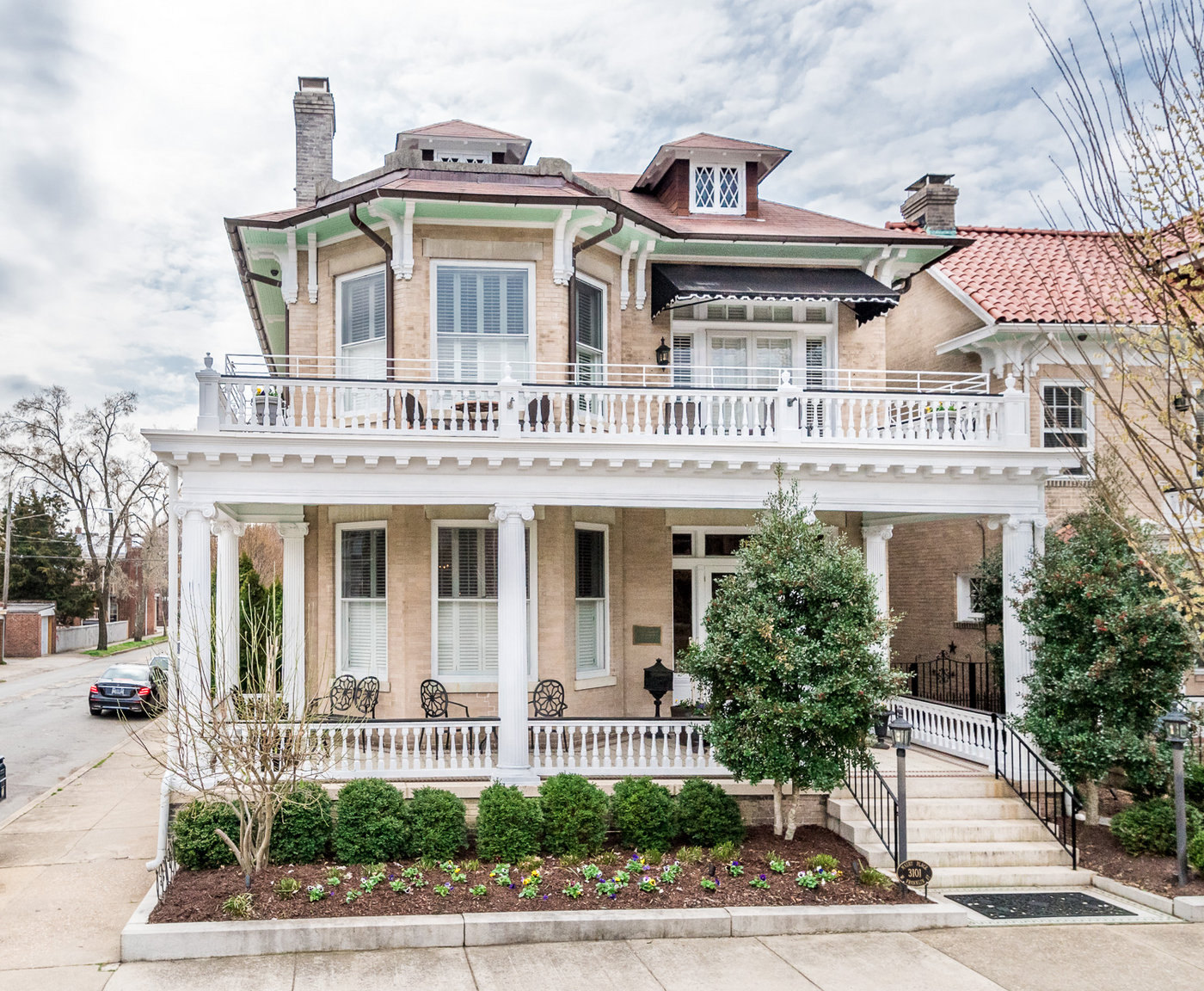
Maury Place

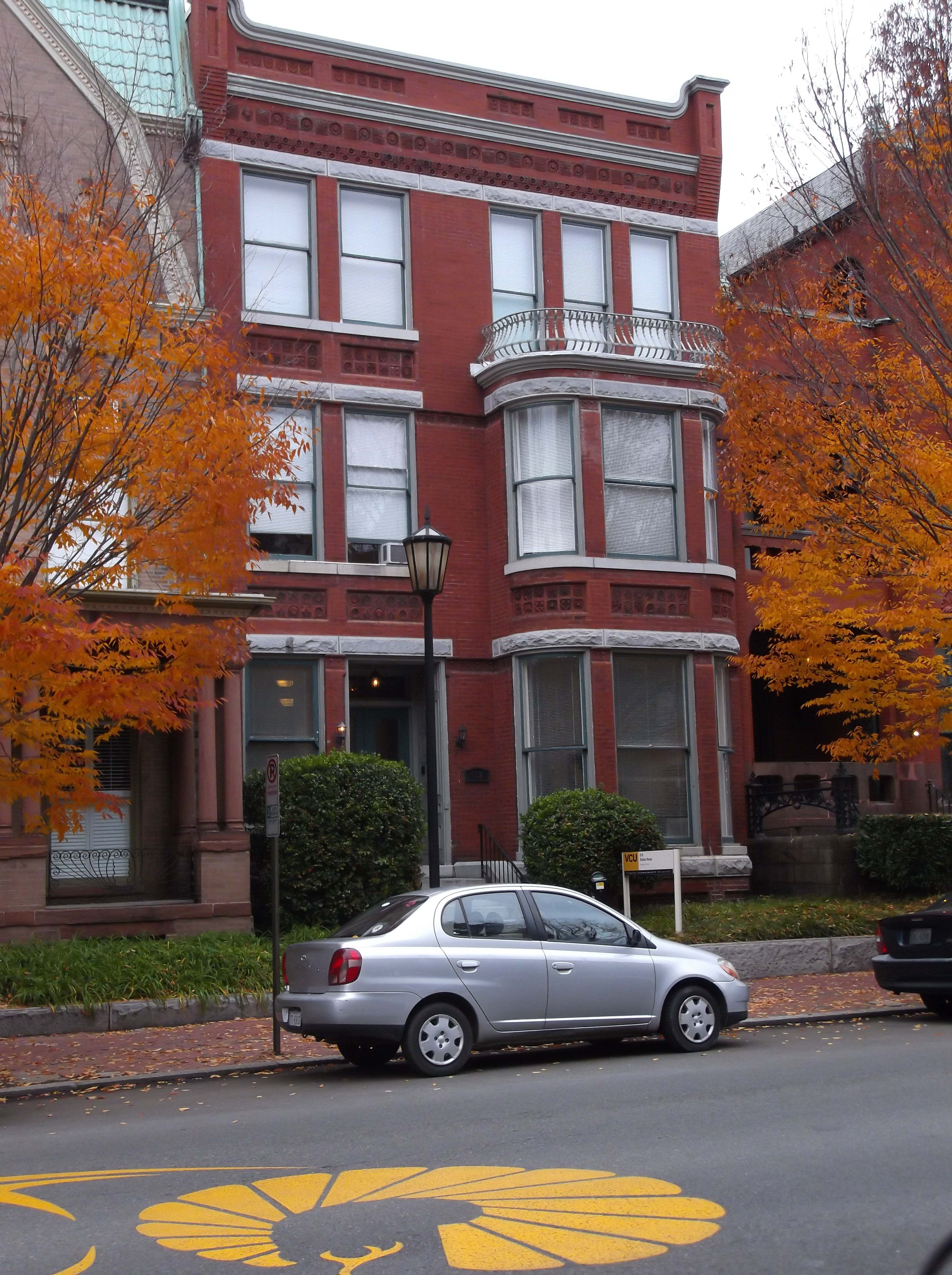
Stokes House

- Henrico County Courthouse (1896) A Richardsonian Romanesque architecture brick building with stone dressings.
- Shenandoah Apartments (1906) on Lee Circle
- Hotel Stumpf (1909) on Main Street
- 200-202 West Broad Street (1910)
- Ruehrmund house (1907) at 2021 W. Grace Street
- Stokes house
- Ten unit townhouse row on the east side of the Meadow Street Park
- Houses in the Fan District (originally the Lee District)
- Mechanics Savings Bank at 212 East Clay Street (a bank for African-Americans)
- Maury Place – 3101 West Franklin St. 1916
- 712 East Grace St. (1916)
- 120 South Boulevard (1918)
- 1633 Monument Ave. (1910)
- 100-104 Granby St. (1909)
- 107-109 Granby St. (1909)
- 1525 Grove Ave. (1908)
- 1527 Grove Ave. (1908)
- 601 and 603 South Davis Ave. (1917)
- 415 West Broad St. Steinbrecher Building 1915
- 7-11 East Broad St. Mayer and Pettit Store (1901)
- 201 North Sycamore St. Petersburg, Va. Globe Dept. Store 1901
- St. Vincent DePaul Catholic Church, Newport News, Virginia (1916)
