= St. Vincent de Paul Catholic Church (Newport News, Virginia) =

Historic church in Virginia, US

- U.S. National Register of Historic Places
- Virginia Landmarks Register
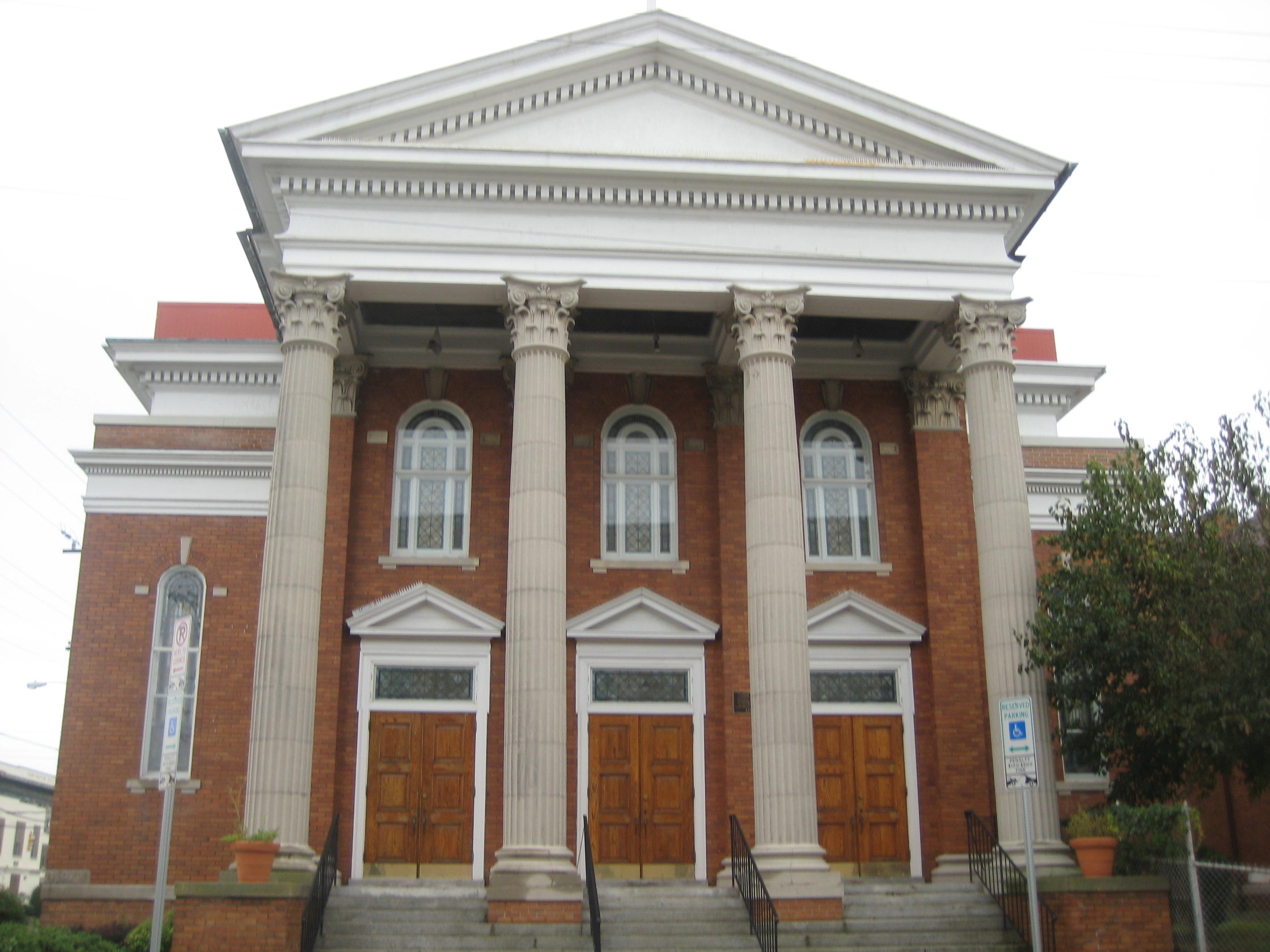
- St. Vincent de Paul Catholic Church, September 2012

- Location within Virginia Location within the United States
- Location: 230 33rd St., Newport News, Virginia
- Coordinates: 36°58′59″N 76°25′56″W
- Area: less than one acre
- Built: 1916-1917
- Architect: Ruehrmund, Carl
- Architectural style: Classical Revival
- NRHP reference No.: 05000525
- VLR No.: 121-0032

Significant dates
- Added to NRHP: June 2, 2005
- Designated VLR: March 16, 2005

St. Vincent de Paul Catholic Church is a historic Catholic church complex in Newport News, Virginia, United States. It was built 1916–1917 and is a 1 1/2-story, brick, Classical Revival-style longitudinal-plan church. It was designed by the Carl Ruehrmurd of Richmond, Virginia. The front facade features a pedimented portico with four fluted Corinthian order columns. Associated with the church are the contributing rectory (1917), garage (1917), and prayer garden. The parish was established as a mission of the St. Mary Star of the Sea Church at Old Point Comfort in 1881. St. Alphonsus, an African American parish established in 1944, was merged with St. Vincent de Paul in 1970. This made it the first historic church in downtown Newport News to be racially integrated.

It was listed on the National Register of Historic Places in 2005.

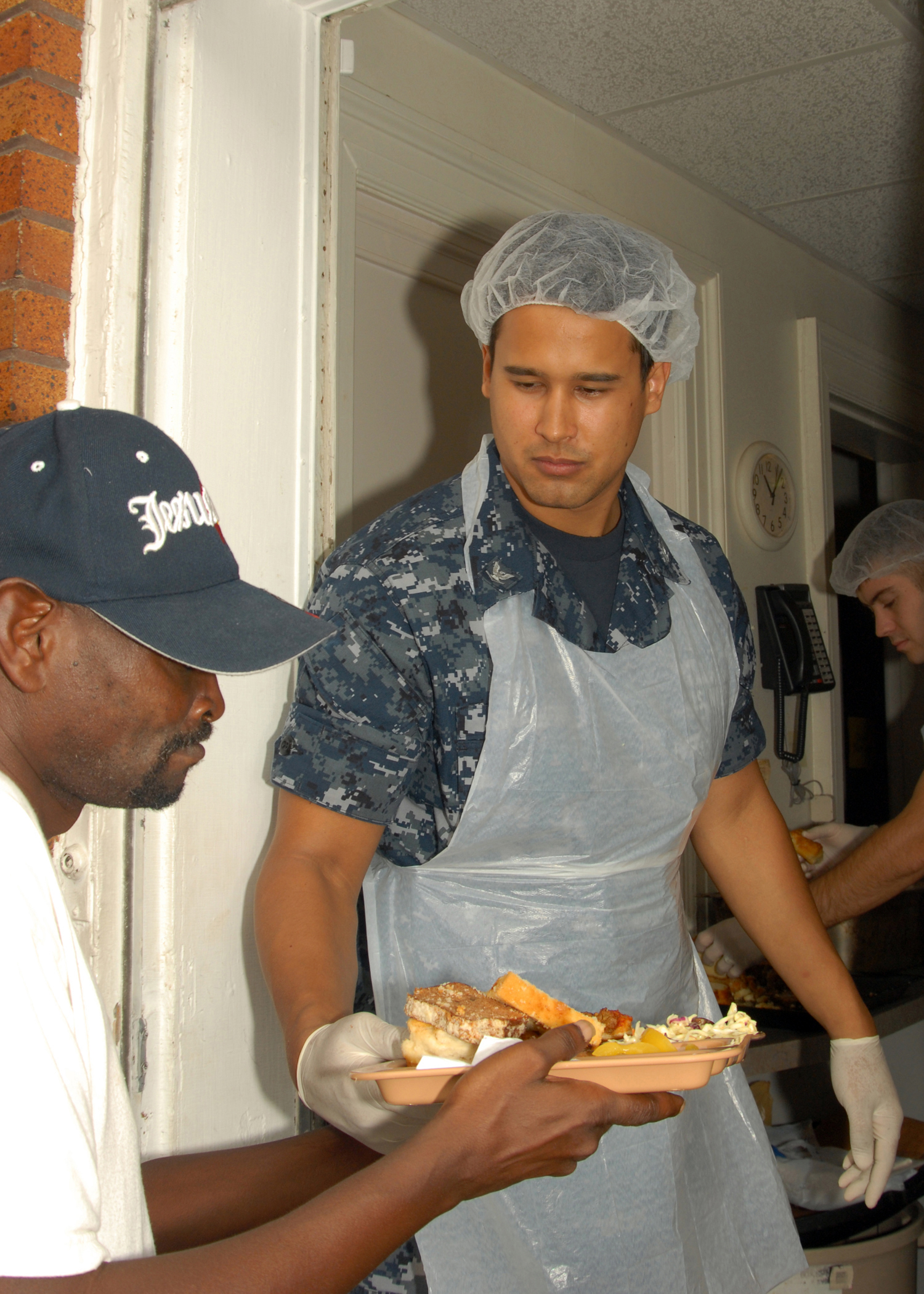
Lunchtime meal at St. Vincent De Paul (September 2009)
