= Lucy Coles =

American missionary

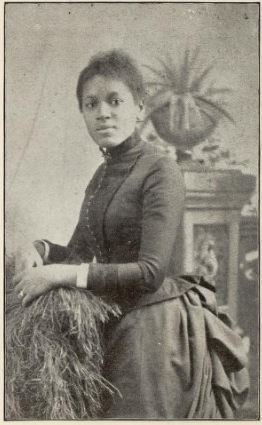
- Born: 1865
- Education: Virginia Union University
- Occupation: American missionary
- Known for: One of the first black women missionaries in Africa

Lucy Ann Henry Coles (born 1865) was an American missionary who travelled to Liberia with her husband John J. Coles. She was one of the first black women missionaries in Africa. She also served as president of the Baptist Foreign Mission Convention after her husband's death. Elizabeth Coles Bouey was her daughter.

She was from Tennessee. She moved to Richmond at 10 and studied in public schools and then Hartshorn Memorial College for a short time until she married Rev. Coles.

In 1898, Z.D. Lewis delivered what Coles described as a fiery speech opposing her attempt to collect funds for mission building in Liberia. Lewis was serving as moderator of the Richmond Minister's Conference.

In Liberia, she helped her husband with his work at the Bendoo Baptist Mission and was a teacher.

== Life and work ==
Lucy Ann Henry was born in 1865 in Richmond, Virginia. As a child, she had to care for her siblings and mother, who was disabled. She attended the Ebenezer Baptist Church. She became a teacher as an adult, where she met John J. Coles, a missionary to Africa.

Henry attended Hartshorn Memorial College, where she completed the missionary training program. On December 21, 1886 she married Coles. In January 1887, the couple went to Sierra Leone to work at Jundoo Mission Station. Coles ran the mission house and oversaw childcare.

After returning to the U.S. in 1895 due to his ill health, her husband died. She took over the remainder of his term as president of the Baptist Foreign Mission Convention.

Coles and her husband were the last missionaries in Grand Cape Mount. The tropical climate took its toll, challenging relations with the indigenous Vai people, and there was the difficulty of communications with sponsoring churches back home in the United States.
