= Harriette Estelle Harris Presley =

American missionary

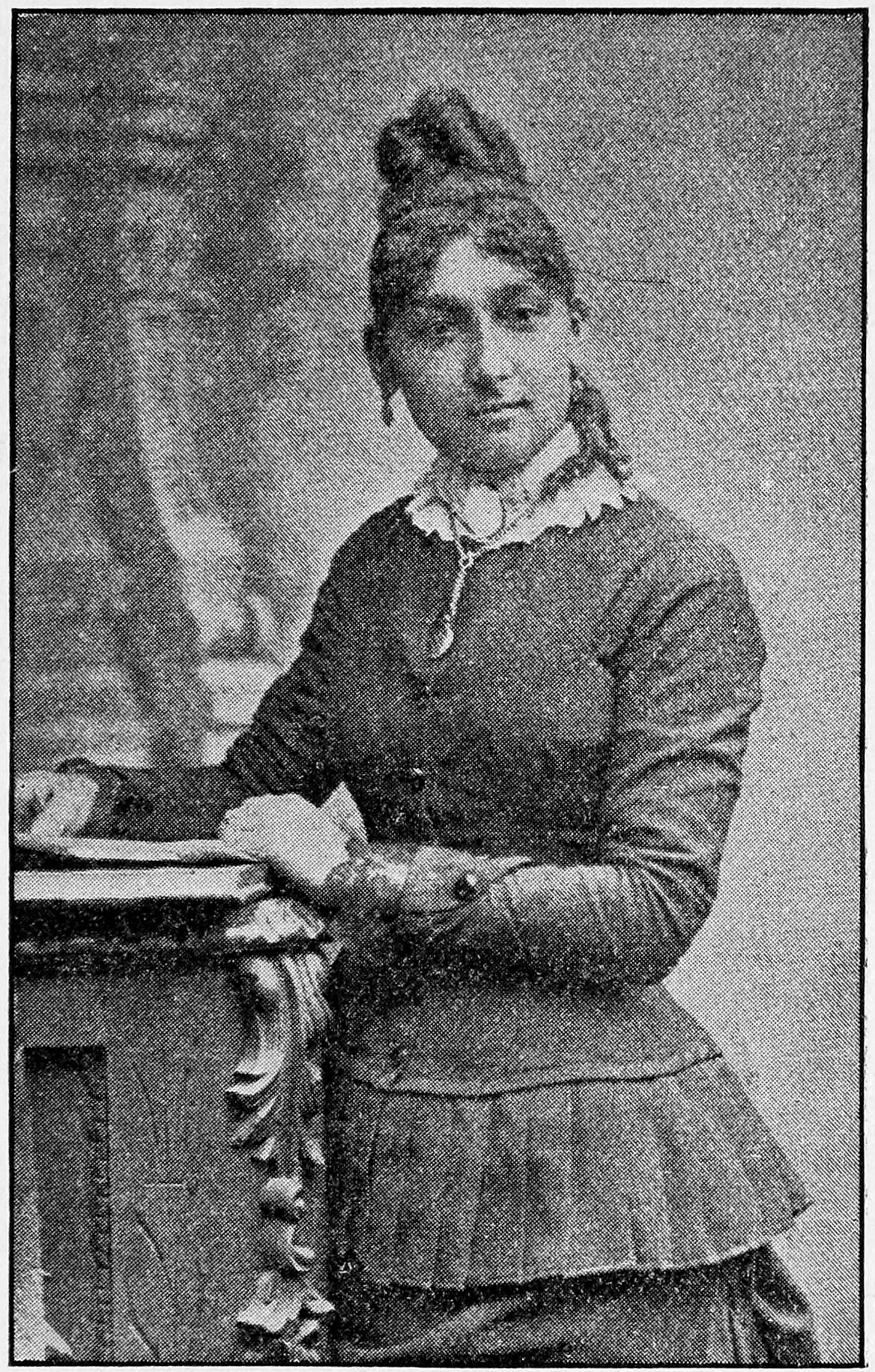
- Harriette Estelle Harris Presley, from a posthumous publication
- Born: 1862; Buckingham County, Virginia, U.S.
- Died: June 1885 (aged 22 or 23); Liberia
- Other names: Hattie Harris Presley
- Occupation: American Baptist missionary in Africa

Harriette Estelle Harris Presley (1862 – June 1885) was an American missionary. With her husband, a Baptist minister, she was a missionary in Liberia in the 1880s.

== Early life and education ==
Hattie Harris was born in Buckingham County, Virginia, and raised by an aunt, Emily Mills, in Richmond, Virginia. She was a member of First African Baptist Church in Richmond. She attended classes at the Richmond Theological Institute, one of the few women admitted to the school before a companion women's school was established.

== Mission work and death ==
Hattie Harris married a pastor, J. H. Presley, in the spring of 1883. The Presleys sailed for Liberia as Baptist missionaries in December 1883, arriving in 1884. They traveled with fellow missionaries W. W. Colley and his wife, Georgie Carter Colley.

Presley died at the Bendoo Mission in Grand Cape Mount in 1885, shortly after her newborn daughter's death, while nursing her husband, who was ill for months with a dangerous fever. Her death was described in church literature as a sacrifice or martyrdom for the church's evangelical work in Africa.

Her husband returned to the United States soon after her death, when his own health allowed. He remarried, and continued to do church work, but he never fully recovered his physical or mental health.
