= Evergreen Cemetery (Richmond, Virginia) =

Historic African-American cemetery

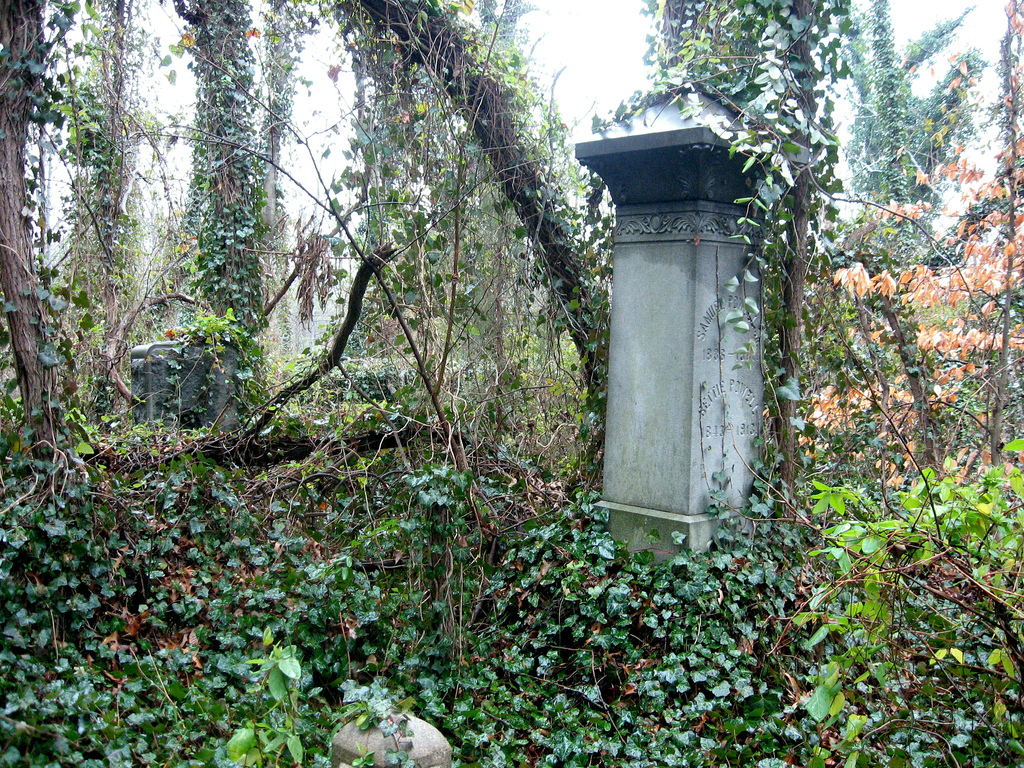
Evergreen Cemetery, Richmond, Virginia

Evergreen Cemetery is a historic African-American cemetery in the East End of Richmond, Virginia, dating from 1891.

The most recent burial in the historic section of the cemetery dates from the 1980s. Much of the privately owned cemetery had completely overgrown with kudzu or is returning to forest until the late 2010's. The original organization responsible for the cemetery, the Evergreen Cemetery Association, made no allowances for perpetual care in its charter. However, in recent years (2019–2022) community efforts have made noticeable progress in cleaning. In 1970, the association sold its more than 5,000 plots to Metropolitan Memorial Services, which soon went bankrupt. A group of black funeral-home directors later bought the site at auction.

== Notable burials ==
- Rev. John Andrew Bowler (1862–1935), educator
- Theodore W. Jones (1853–1943) Canadian-born American businessman, politician
- Z. D. Lewis (1859–1926), Baptist church leader and businessman
- John Mitchell, Jr. (1863–1929), civil rights pioneer
- Maggie L. Walker (1867–1934), businesswoman
