= First African Baptist Church (Richmond, Virginia) =

Historic church in Virginia, US

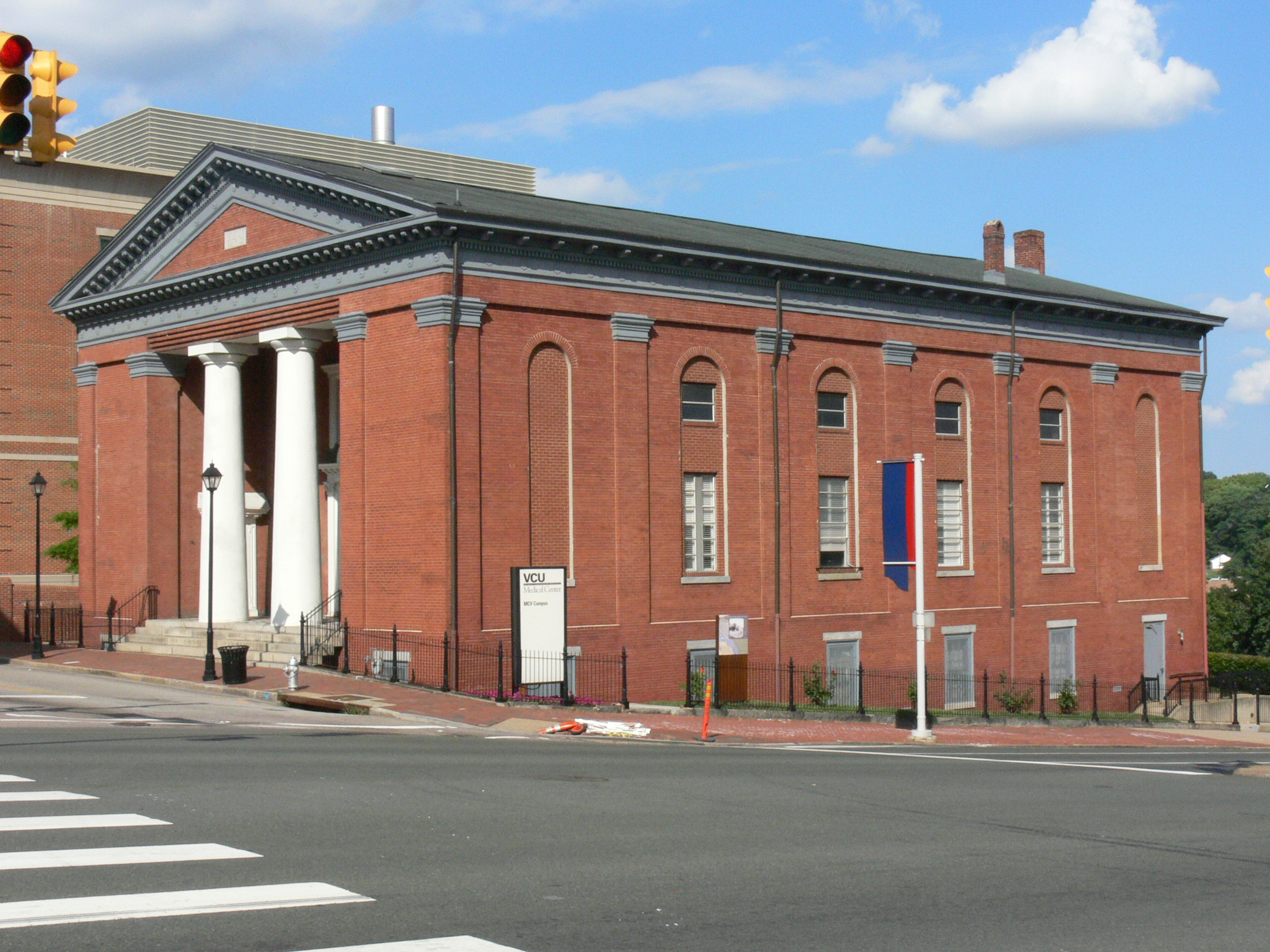
- The old church building, now a property of Medical College of Virginia
- First African Baptist Church
- Location: Richmond, Virginia
- Country: USA
- Denomination: Baptist
- Website: firstafricanbaptist.org

History
- Founded: 1841

The First African Baptist Church of Richmond, Virginia is a Baptist Church. Founded in 1841, its members included both slaves and freedmen. It has since had a major influence on the local black community. At one point, it was one of the largest Protestant churches in the United States.

== History ==
The First African Baptist Church, originally called the African Baptist Church (until the establishment of the 2nd African Baptist Church in about 1846) was founded in 1841 by the black members of Richmond's First Baptist Church, along with some of the Black members of the Second and the Third Baptist Church as well. The First Baptist Church housed a multiracial congregation from its early beginnings until the white members of the congregation built a new church in 1841. First Baptist was originally founded in 1780 as the Richmond Baptist Church, and first located on the northeast corner of Cary St. at 2nd St. The congregation moved in 1802. For many years leading up to the split of the congregation, whites were a minority at the church—a fact which made some of them uncomfortable. Many black members had also called for a split because they were often denied entrance after the building became crowded. After they built a new church building for the white members of the First Baptist Church, the church leadership sold the building that they had been meeting in to the black members. It was then renamed by adding "African" to the title. Most of its early enslaved members were initially from the Tidewater region of Virginia before they were hired to businesses in Richmond. Many freedmen traveled from other cities to attend its services, as well.

In 1866 James H. Holmes, a former slave and highly gifted preacher, and also a member and deacon of the church, was elected assistant pastor, and in 1867 pastor at the Church. Under Holmes, the church grew significantly and became one of the largest churches in the country. In 1871 he baptized 600 people, in 1878 he baptized 1,100. In 1876 the original building was torn down and the congregation built a new church costing $35,000 and installed an organ costing $2,500, which was the largest organ in any African American church, in 1877. The location of both the original church building and its replacement is at the corner of College Street and East Broad Street. The demolition of the original church building was an act which brought accusations of "a true lack of American veneration for old things" from Harpers Weekly. Architect Thomas U. Walter designed the new building, using a Greek Doric temple design. Many of the white congregations in Richmond used a similar style when constructing their churches.

The First African Baptist Church congregation moved in 1955. The church building was then sold to the Medical College of Virginia. Some church members characterized the sale as insensitive to the church's contribution to African-American history. The building now holds offices, classrooms, and laboratories.

=== Attendance ===
At the time that the congregation split from the First Baptist Church there were approximately one thousand three hundred black members. It soon experienced rapid growth. In 1858 an offshoot of the church was established as the Third African Baptist Church for its 400 members who lived west of 2nd St. and north of Broad St. The name of the Third African Baptist Church was soon changed to Ebenezer Baptist Church. By 1861, the services at First African were regularly attended by more than three thousand people. The number of members swelled to four thousand five hundred by 1869. There was a dispute in 1880 which caused over seven hundred members to leave the church. The New York Times wrote that approximately four thousand members remained after the split.

=== Events ===
As one of the largest meeting halls in Richmond, it was often rented for white events. Its large interior and prominent location in Richmond made it a sought after venue for events such as concerts and political rallies. The practice of renting the church was controversial among members due to the use of a church for secular events and due to the racial segregation often imposed at the events. The practice continued, however, due in part to the significant income that it provided.

John Hartwell Cocke lectured on temperance at one of the earliest major events hosted at the church. While the government of the Confederate States of America was based in Richmond during the American Civil War, the church was often used for speeches by politicians including Governor William Smith and President Jefferson Davis. Judah Benjamin also spoke at the church to recruit blacks into the Confederate Army. In 1865 Horace Greely, abolitionist publisher of the New York Tribune spoke at the church regarding the post-Civil War Reconstruction.

== Practices ==
Though it was a Black church from the time of its 1841 separation from the First Baptist Church, it was led by a white minister and a board of thirty black deacons because it was illegal for blacks to preach. Though the majority of the members were slaves in the years before the Civil War, most of the early leaders were freedmen due to greater liberties that they possessed. The first pastor, Robert Ryland, served from 1841 until 1865. Ryland owned slaves and believed that slavery was the best way to convert Africans to Christianity. The church also sent several of its members to Africa as missionaries.

Though Virginia state law did not permit slaves to marry, the church would hold wedding ceremonies for its members. The church allowed slaves to divorce and remarry if their spouse were sold out of state.

Their services were marked by enthusiastic singing and exhortation and were a popular attraction for visitors to Richmond. There was a space located near the pulpit that was reserved for white visitors. Some white residents of Richmond frequently cited the positive tone of services there as proof that their slaves lived happy lives, much to the dismay of their slaves.

Even though it was against state law to teach blacks to read, Ryland published a catechism for members which allowed them to learn to read. This practice caused some controversy, but Ryland defended himself by citing the fact that his lessons emphasized submission to authority. His practice of educating slaves was initially controversial, in part due to a high-profile murder committed by a member of the congregation. Richmond's white churches eventually defused the situation by coming out in support of Ryland's educational programs. Ryland later touted the conservatism of his congregation against those who feared slave rebellions.

Some members were also allowed to occasionally preach from the pews, and some of the lay preachers were purchased from their owners and emancipated with funds raised by the church. It did not gain its first Black senior minister until 1867, however. The first Black man to serve as senior minister was James Holmes, a longtime deacon who was born a slave.

== Notable members ==
- Lucy Goode Brooks
- Rev. Walter Henderson Brooks
- Harriette Estelle Harris Presley
- Maggie Walker
- John Mitchell Jr.
- Henry Box Brown
- John Jasper
- Mary Lumpkin
- Gilbert Hunt

== Developments ==
On Feb 21, 2025 the Richmond Times Dispatch reported that a proposal in the Virginia state budget calls for Virginia Commonwealth University (VCU) to relinquish control of the historic First African Church building, and to give it to Virginia State University. It would then be leased to Virginia Union University, who would use it as a museum to display its historical collection.

== Bibliography ==
- Furgurson, Ernest (1996), Ashes of Glory: Richmond at War (2 ed.), New York: Vintage Books, ISBN 978-0-679-74660-7
- Kimball, Gregg (2000), American City, Southern Place: A Cultural History of Antebellum Richmond, Athens, Georgia: University of Georgia Press, ISBN 978-0-8203-2234-6
- Richardson, Selden (2008), Maurice Duke (ed.), Built by Blacks: African American architecture and neighborhoods in Richmond (2 ed.), Charleston, South Carolina: The History Press, ISBN 978-1-59629-459-2
