= Mechanics Savings Bank =

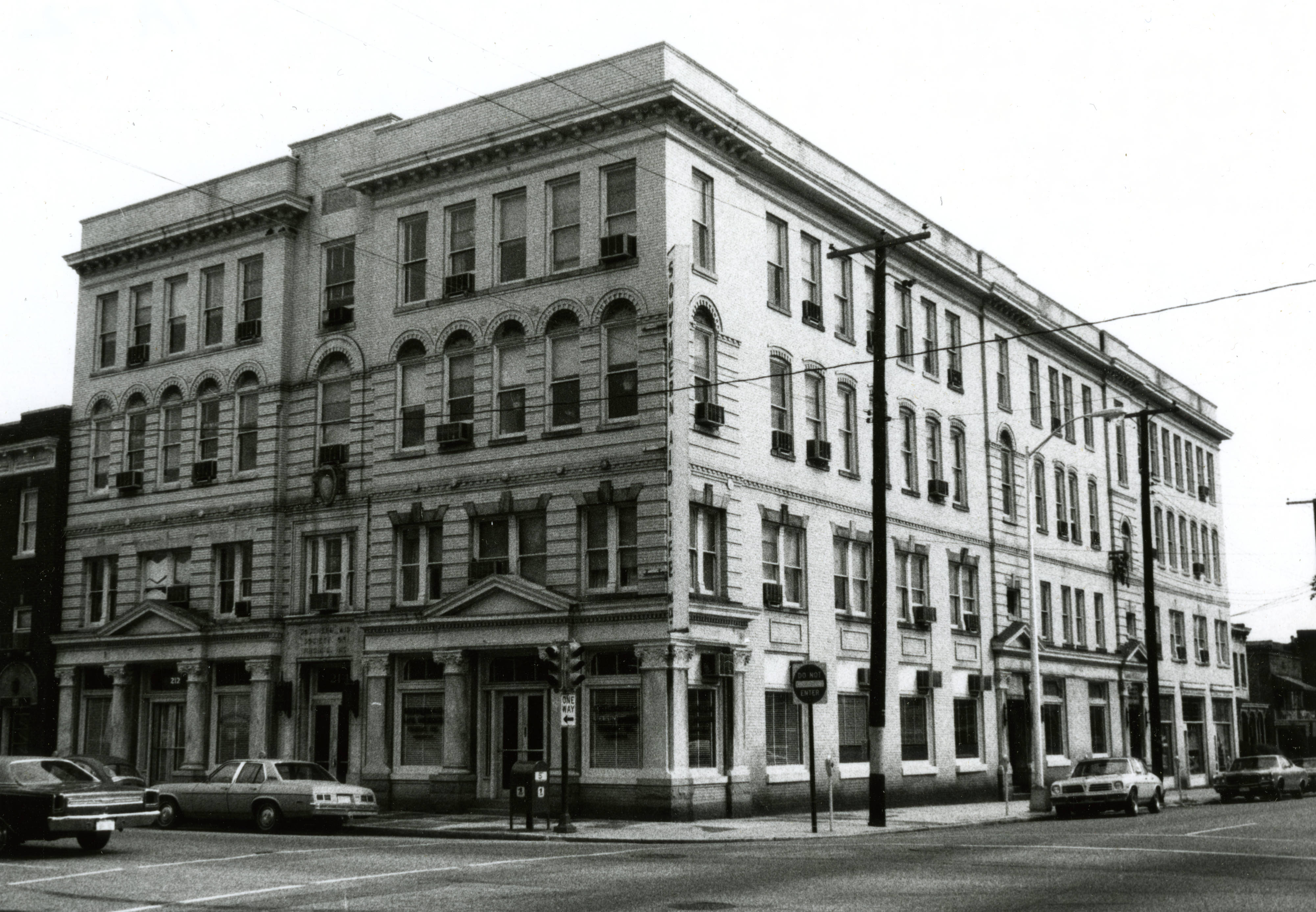
Mechanics Savings Bank building in the 1970s after it had become home for the Southern Aid and Insurance Company

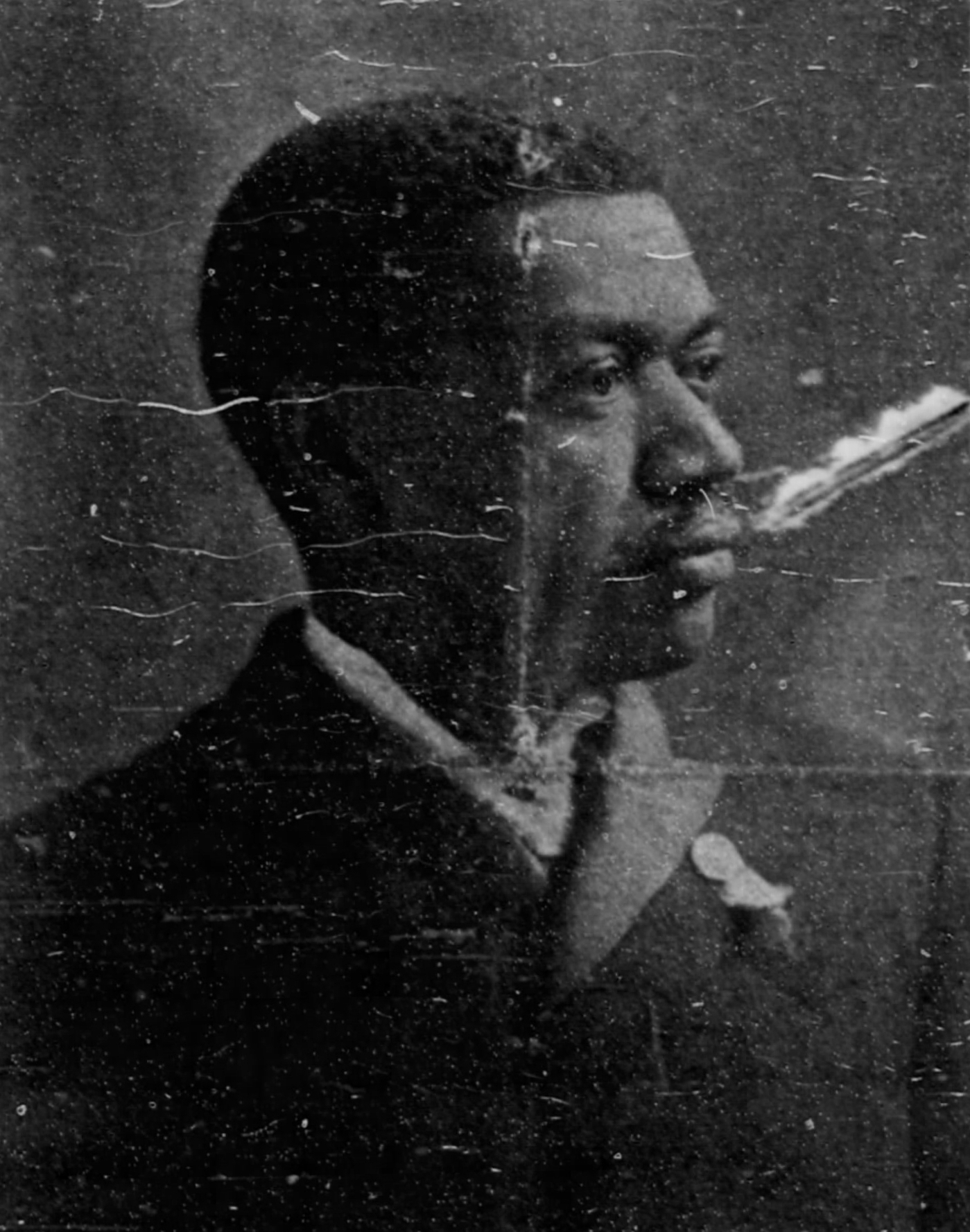
Photograph of Mechanics Savings Bank president John Mitchell Jr. published in the Richmond Planet

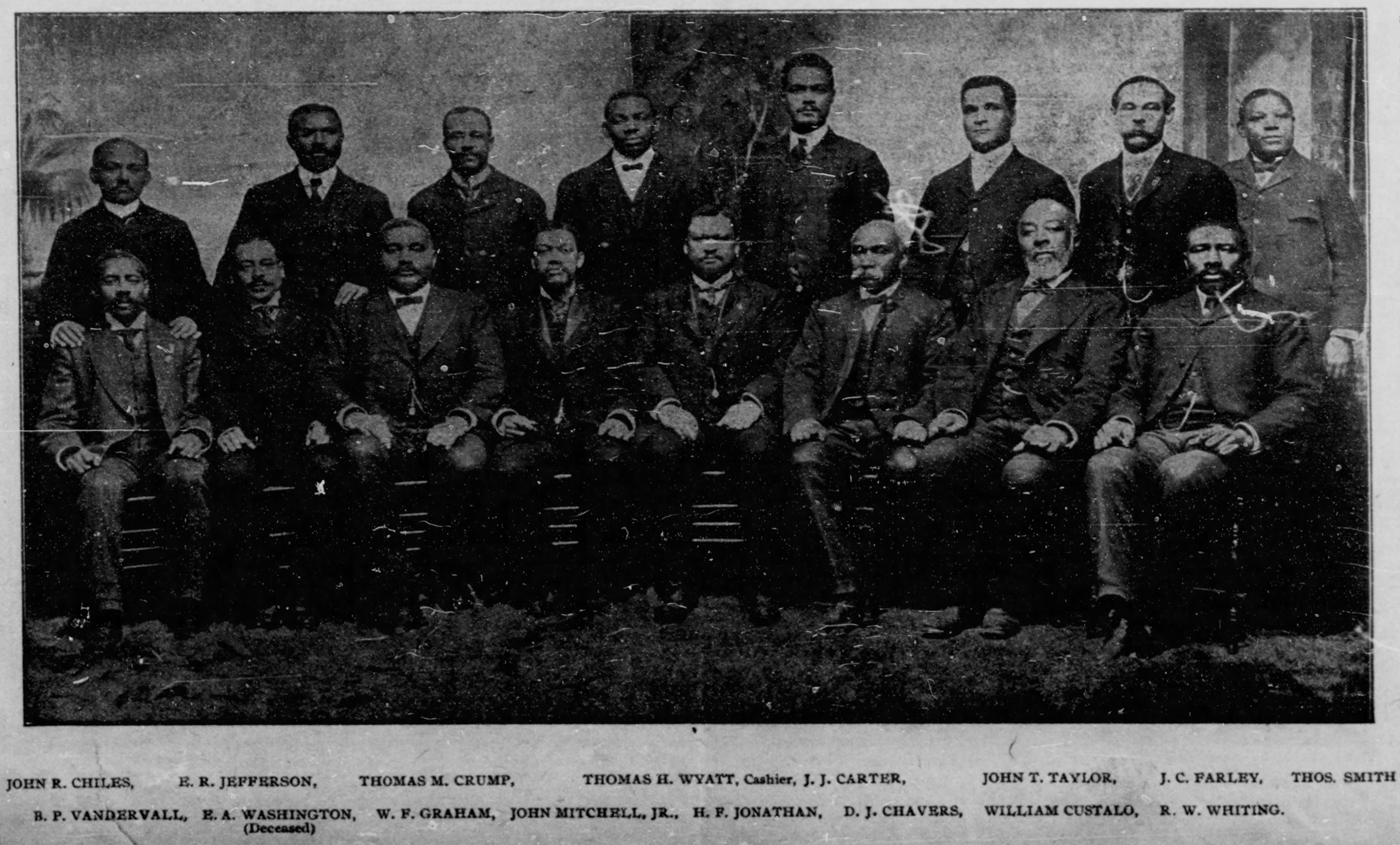
Mechanics Savings Bank Board of Directors printed in 1902. John Mitchell Jr. is fourth from the left in the front row

Founded in 1902 by John Mitchell, Jr., Mechanics Savings Bank was a bank near the Jackson Ward neighborhood of Richmond, Virginia. Mitchell, who was an African American, also owned and edited the Richmond Planet. The bank was originally located at 511 N 3rd St., which was also the address of the Office of the Grand Lodge, Knights of Pythias of VA In 1905 the bank bought a three-story brick building at No. 310 East Broad Street. The bank's 3rd and last location was at the northwest corner of Third and Clay Street. The building was designed by architect Carl Ruehrmund and constructed in 1910. The bank was the chief depository of the Knights of Pythias. At the time of its failure in 1922, the bank had deposits totaling approximately $500,000. In 1930, the Clay Street Building was purchased by the Southern Aid and Insurance Company.
