= Smithville, Virginia =

Unincorporated community in Virginia, United States

Coordinates: 37.6670750°N 75.8435436°W

Smithville is an unincorporated community in Accomack County, Virginia, United States.
