= John Mitchell Jr. =

American journalist (1863–1929)

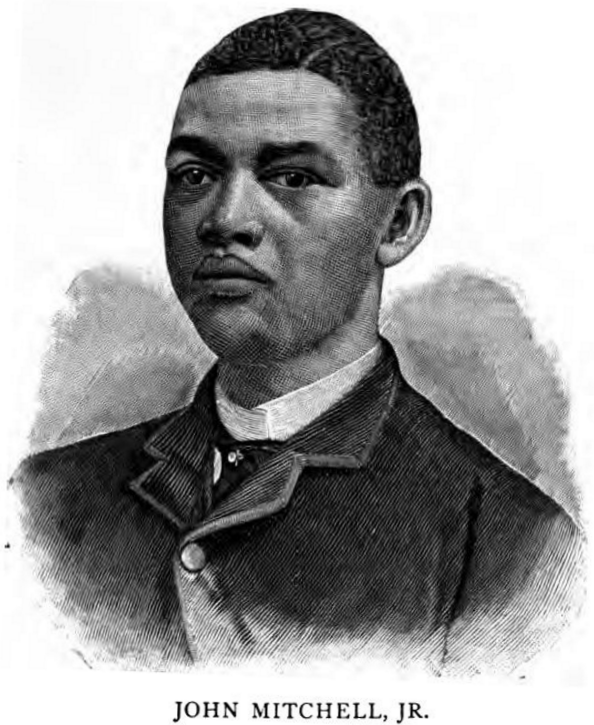
- Born: July 11, 1863; Richmond, Virginia, U.S.
- Died: December 3, 1929 (aged 66); Richmond, Virginia, U.S.
- Resting place: Evergreen Cemetery
- Occupations: journalist, politician
- Political party: Republican

John Mitchell Jr. (July 11, 1863 – December 3, 1929) was an American businessman, newspaper editor, African American civil rights activist, and politician in Richmond, Virginia, particularly in Richmond's Jackson Ward, which became known as the "Black Wall Street of America." As editor of the Richmond Planet, he frequently published articles in favor of racial equality. In 1904, he organized a black boycott of the city's segregated trolley system.

He founded and served as president of Mechanics Savings Bank. An impressive building was constructed for the Bank on Clay Street and newspaper ads featured Mitchell Jr. He also served as a city alderman for two terms, and was active in fraternal and professional organizations. He ran unsuccessfully as a Republican Party candidate for governor in 1921.

== Early life and education ==
Mitchell was born a slave in Richmond, Virginia in 1863, shortly before the end of the American Civil War and of slavery. His mother taught him to read and later he worked as a newsboy while attending school. He then became a carriage boy for James Lyons, an aristocratic lawyer. Lyons opposed Mitchell's education, but Mitchell's mother persisted, and Mitchell attended the school taught by Rev. A. Binga Jr. In 1876, he entered the Richmond Normal High School and in 1877 he received a silver medal for being first in his class. In May 1878, he joined the first Baptist Church and became an active member throughout his life, even serving as chairman of the executive board of the Virginia Baptist State Sunday school convention. In 1881, he created a map for his classmates and teacher which attracted the attention of minister to Austria A. M. Riley, who gave him a medal for his efforts. He won yet another medal in an oration contest and he continued drawing maps. His maps eventually secured him an apprenticeship in the Bureau of Engraving and Printing in Washington, D.C. at the recommendation of John Wesley Cromwell. He started his apprenticeship with encouragement and support from a number of prominent figures, including Blanche Bruce, John A. Logan, and Frederick Douglass.

== Career ==
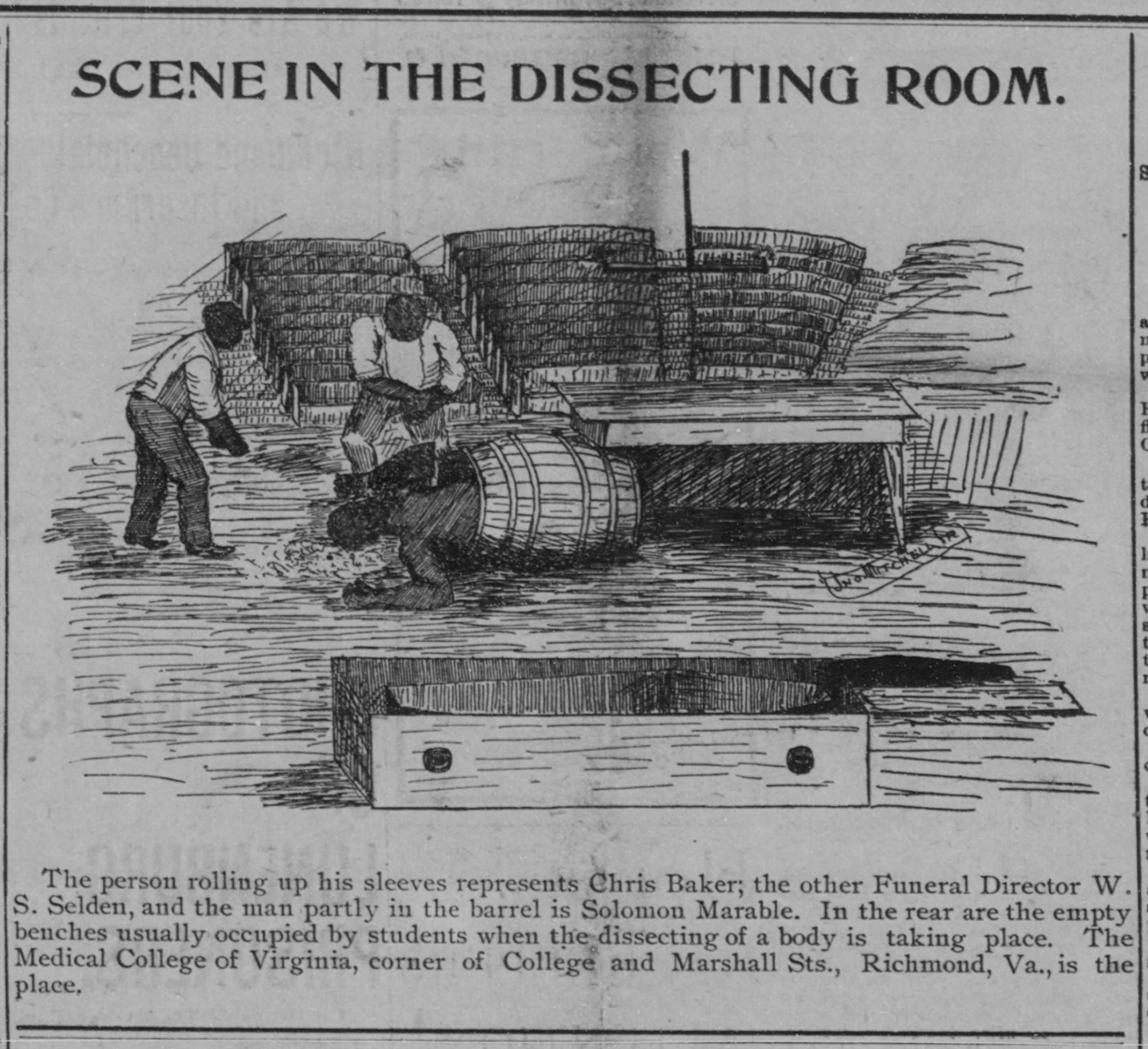
Solomon Marable's body was found packed into a barrel of salt for preservation.

In 1883 and 1884, he served as Richmond correspondent of the New York Freeman. On December 5, 1884, at the age of 21, Mitchell joined the Richmond Planet, a newly founded black newspaper and was made an editor. "It was under his tenure that the Planet gained its well-deserved reputation as a proponent of racial equality and of rights for the African-American community." He was also a teacher in the local schools.

Mitchell reported fearlessly and campaigned against racist lynching, which increased in the late nineteenth century as whites worked to re-establish white supremacy and Jim Crow after the end of the Reconstruction era. Like Ida B. Wells, he reported lynchings. Mitchell's condemnation of the lynching of Richard Walker in Charlotte County, Virginia resulted in his receiving death threats:

Mitchell himself was threatened with hanging at the hands of a Charlotte County mob angered by his reporting of the lynching, there, of Richard Walker in May 1886. Mitchell was sent a rope with a note attached warning him that he would be lynched himself if he ever set foot in the county. In reply, and borrowing a line from Shakespeare, Mitchell had this to say: 'There are no terrors, Cassius, in your threats, for I am so strong in honesty that they pass by me like the idle wind, which I respect not.' Then, armed with two Smith & Wesson pistols, he boarded a train for Smithville and undeterred, walked the five miles from the station to the site of the hanging.

— Maurice Duke and Daniel P. Jordan, eds., A Richmond Reader: 1733–1983, (Chapel Hill, N.C., 1983), pp. 327–328]

Another early case Mitchell reported was the murder of a black man named Banks by a white officer named Priddy. Mitchell declared the officer guilty of murder and was summoned to the grand jury. He was indicted for making such a charge, but the case was dropped. He sought to have the body exhumed and examined, as he had heard a report that Banks was beaten to death. When he went to the mortuary where the body was at the University of Virginia, Charlottesville, he was locked in the mortuary and had to escape and hurry back to Richmond to make an appointment in the courts the next morning. The officer was not convicted or punished.

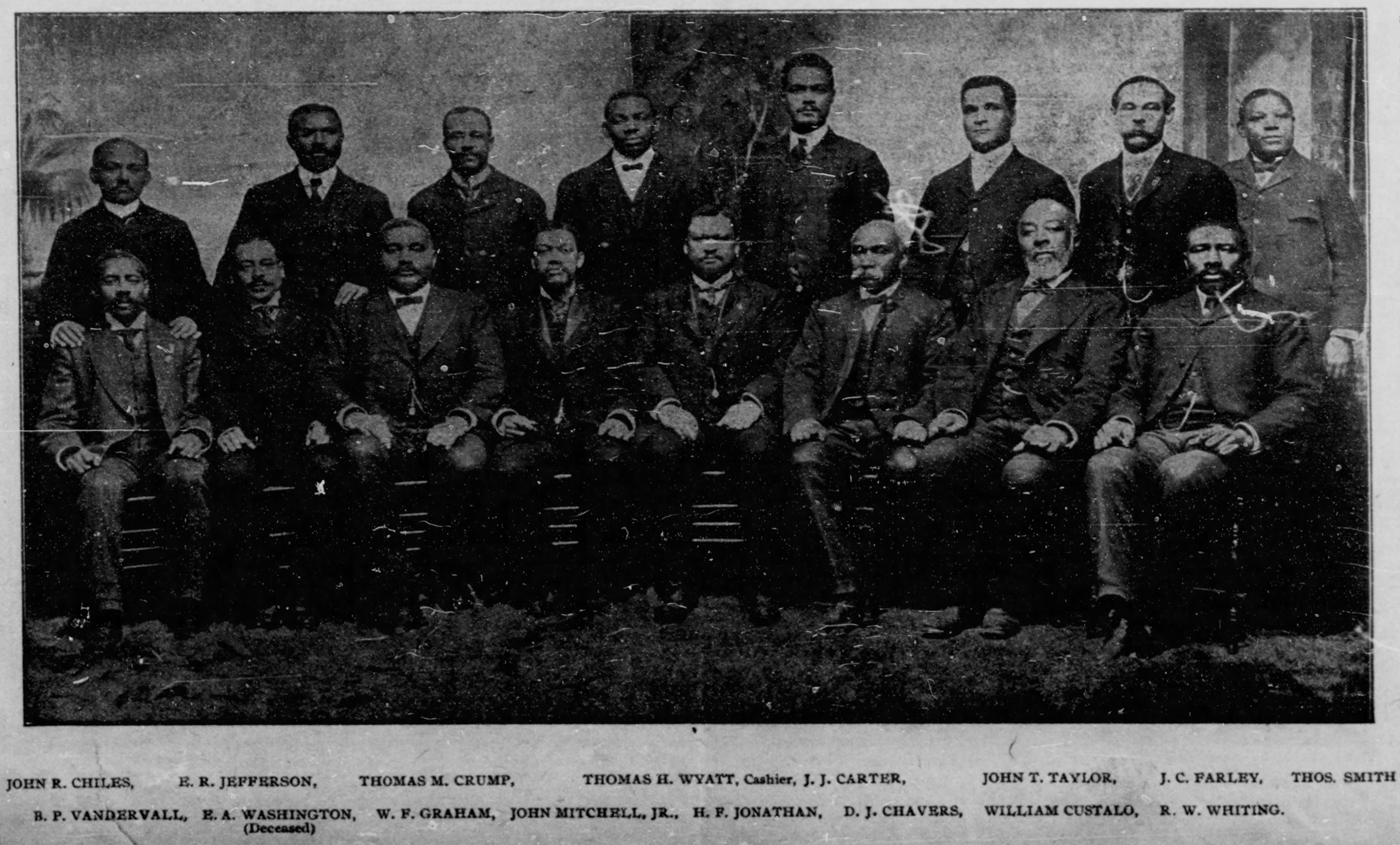
Mechanics Savings Bank board of directors printed in 1902. Mitchell is fourth from the left in the front row.

In 1896, together with local clergy including James H. Holmes, Mitchell appealed on the behalf of the widow of Solomon Marable for the return of his body after his execution and partial dissection by students at the Medical College of Virginia. The body had been legally seized by the College's janitor, Chris Baker. Mitchell investigated the case for the Richmond Planet and included grisly sketches by Mitchell of the events on its pages.

Mitchell was gregarious and active; he became a leader of the Knights of Pythias of North America, South America, Europe, Asia, Africa and Australia, a black fraternal organization, both locally and on the state level, where he led it into the 1920s. He was also president of the National Afro-American Press Association. Mitchell was the founder and president of the Mechanics Savings Bank in Richmond. It was part of the rise of black-owned businesses in the city. Among the bank's board of directors was photographer James C. Farley, who also worked with Mitchell at the Planet.

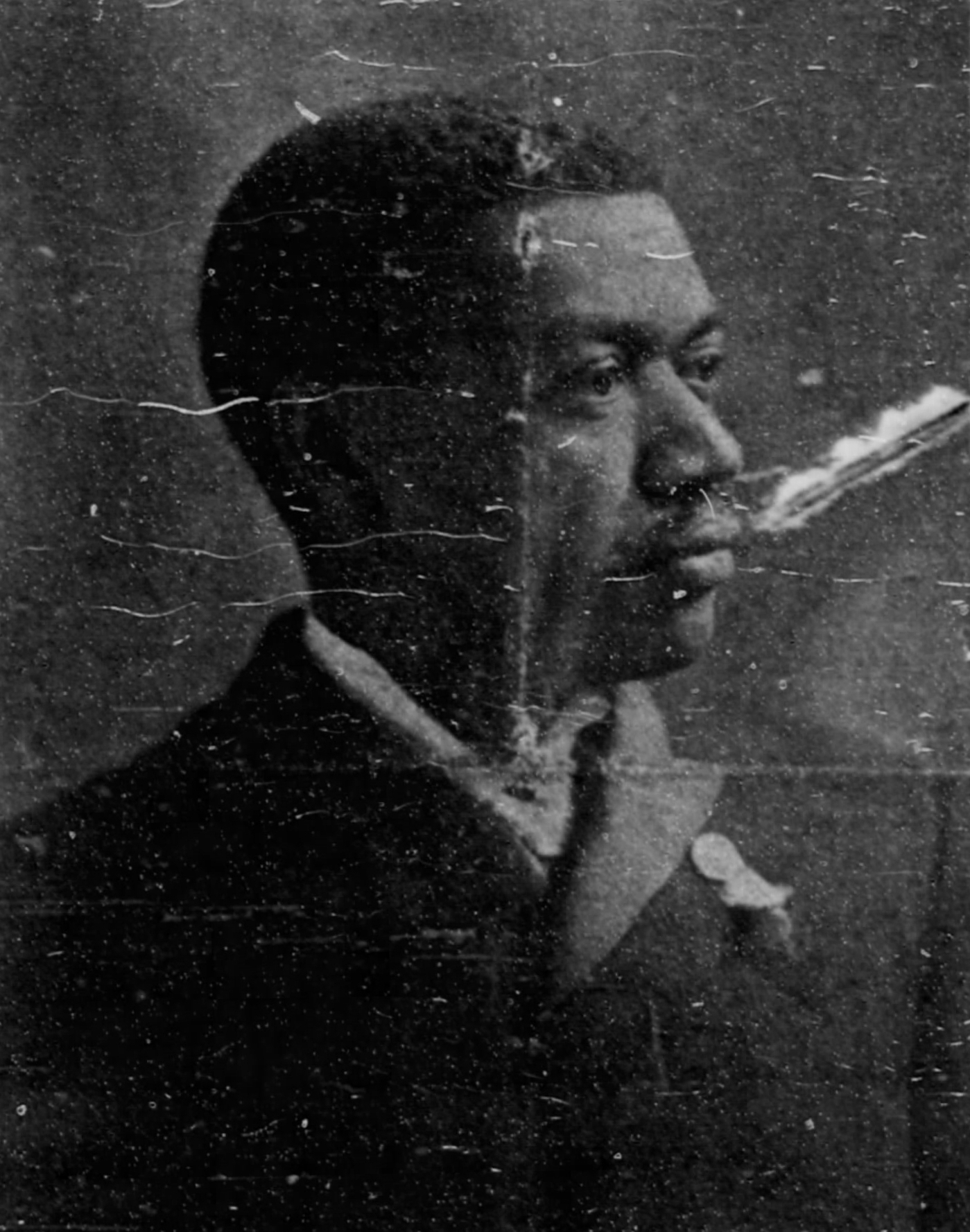
Image of Mitchell printed in a profile of the Mechanics Savings Bank in 1902.

In 1904, Richmond passed a new law to enforce segregated seating areas on its trolleys. In protest, Mitchell helped organize mass meetings and a boycott by blacks of the system. As Mitchell gleefully covered in his article: "Street Car Trap", on the first day of the new system, only whites were arrested for refusing to change their seats; some could not be bothered to observe the new rules or had not realized the change was happening. The electric trolley system had been created in 1888. Suffering the loss of black business, but refusing to give up its Jim Crow policy, the trolley company went into receivership.

== Politics ==
In 1892 and 1894, Mitchell was elected to a seat as a Richmond city alderman from Jackson Ward. It was another facet of his widespread connections in the community.

In a more ambitious move, in 1921, Mitchell ran for governor, on what was called a "Lily Black" (Black-and-tan faction) Republican Party ticket (an all African American party offshoot). His campaign was considered controversial and opposed by some Black newspapers, such as the Norfolk Journal and Guide; editors believed his run would split the Black vote and cost them influence with the Democratic Party candidate who won the office. Mitchell finished a distant third behind the Democrat and the "Lily White" Republican candidate, receiving barely 2% of the total vote.

He died at his desk in December 1929.

== Legacy and honors ==
- In 1996, the Library of Virginia had an extensive exhibit about John Mitchell Jr. and his contributions to the Richmond Planet and the community in his public life.
- The Valentine, a museum and educational center exclusively concerned with Richmond's history, exhibits a woodcut portrait of Mitchell with an informational plaque about his life.

== See also ==
- African-American business history
- Elizabeth Jennings Graham, 1854 sued and won case that led to desegregation of streetcars in New York City
- Charlotte L. Brown, desegregated streetcars in San Francisco in the 1860s
- Irene Morgan, in 1944, sued and won Supreme Court ruling that segregation of interstate buses was unconstitutional
- Rosa Parks, inspired boycott against segregated buses in 1950s in Montgomery, Alabama
