= Elizabeth Coles Bouey =

American missionary

- Born: November 14, 1891; Liberia
- Died: February 5, 1957 (aged 65); Richmond, Virginia, US
- Education: Virginia Union University, Columbia University
- Occupation: Missionary
- Spouse: Edward Hunter Bouey (m. 1920)
- Parent(s): Rev. and Lucy Coles

Elizabeth Coles Bouey (November 14, 1891 – February 5, 1957) was a Liberian-born American missionary and church worker. She founded the National Association of Ministers' Wives in 1939.

== Early life ==
Elizabeth A. Coles was born in Liberia, the daughter of American missionaries, Rev. John J. Coles and Lucy Ann Henry Coles. Her father was born in Virginia; her mother was from Tennessee. She was raised by her widowed mother in Virginia after 1893, and graduated from Armstrong High School. She trained as a teacher as a young woman, at Armstrong Normal School. Later in life, she studied theology at Virginia Union University and earned a master's degree in education from Columbia University.

== Career ==
Elizabeth Coles taught school as a young woman. After marriage, she returned to Liberia with her husband; they did missionary work at Bendoo Station, teaching and building a hospital. She represented the Baptist Mission Board at an international conference in Belgium in 1926.

The Boueys returned to the United States in 1929 and settled in Richmond, Virginia, where Elizabeth Coles Bouey began organizing the National Association of Ministers' Wives (NAMW) in 1939, and served as the organization's first president from 1941. Under her tenure, the organization grew and built a home in Richmond for elderly ministers' wives. She traveled internationally to promote its work as well as to continue her own education.

Bouey taught Bible study classes and made religious radio programs in Richmond later in life, and was active on behalf of women prisoners at the State Prison Farm. In 1939 she served on the executive committee of the Richmond branch of the National Association for the Advancement of Colored People, when the annual meeting was held in Richmond.

== Personal life ==
Elizabeth Coles married Edward Hunter Bouey at Richmond's Ebenezer Baptist Church in 1920. His father was missionary Harrison N. Bouey. Their children Edward and Melicent were born in Liberia; they also adopted a son, Johnson Bye Tamiah Moore (also known as Bai T. Moore), while they lived there. Elizabeth was widowed in 1956 and died in 1957, in Richmond, aged 65 years. The organization she founded continues as the International Association of Ministers' Wives and Ministers' Widows (IAMW&MW). The organization's highest award is named for her. There is also a scholarship named in her memory at Virginia Union Seminary.
