= Richmond Planet =

African-American newspaper in Richmond Virginia

The Richmond Planet
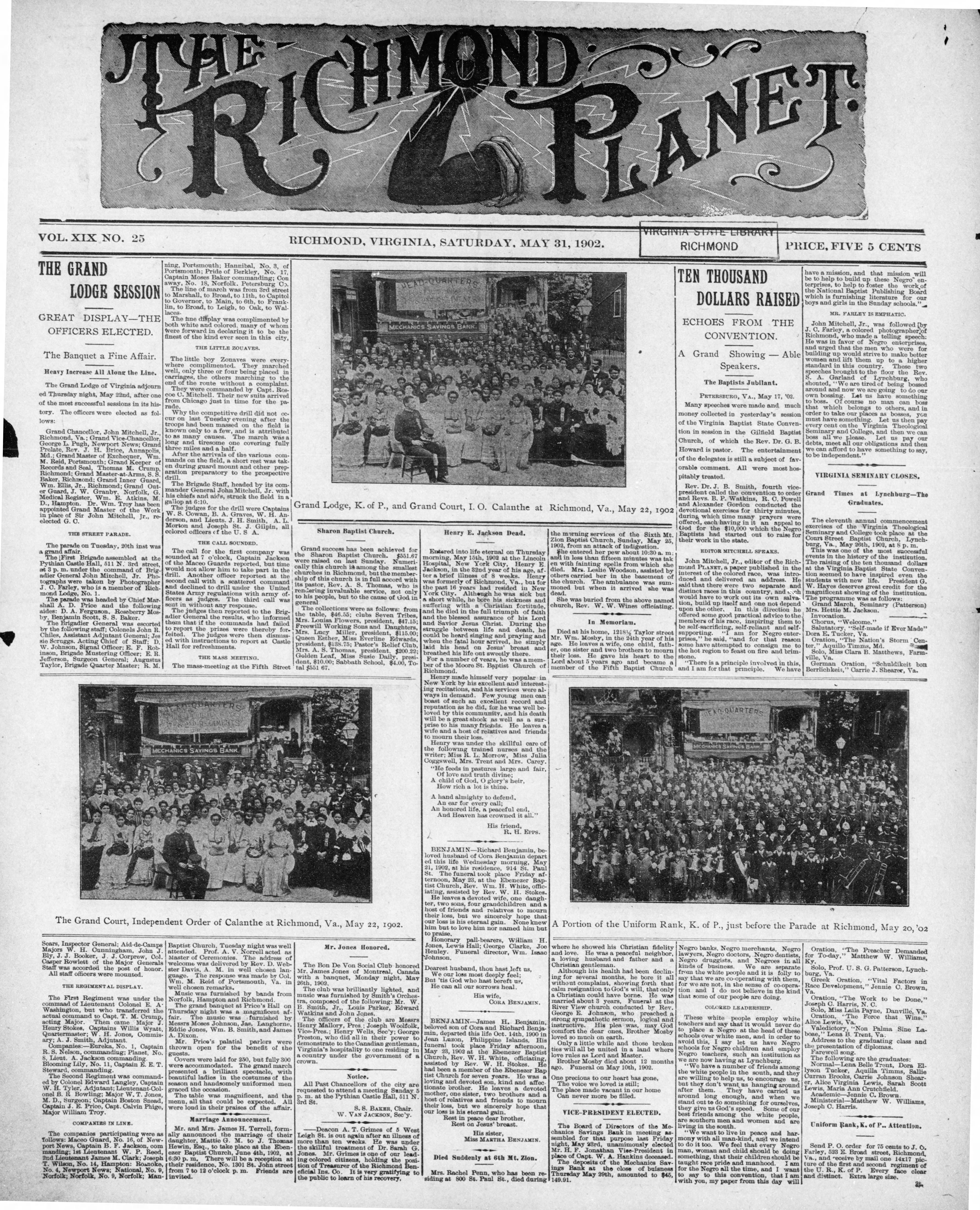
- Richmond Planet on Saturday, May 31, 1902
- Founder(s): James H. Hayes, James H. Johnston, E.R. Carter, Walter Fitzhugh, George W. Lewis, James E. Robinson, Henry Hucles, Albert V. Norrell, Benjamin A. Graves, James E. Merriweather, Edward A. Randolph, William H. Andrews; Reuben T. Hill
- Publisher: Edwin A. Randolph; John Mitchell Jr. (1884–1929)
- Founded: 1882
- Ceased publication: 1938
- City: Richmond, Virginia
- Country: United States
- ISSN: 2151-4011
- OCLC number: 10412790

The Richmond Planet was an African American newspaper founded in 1882 in Richmond, Virginia. In 1938, it merged with the Richmond Afro-American.

== History ==
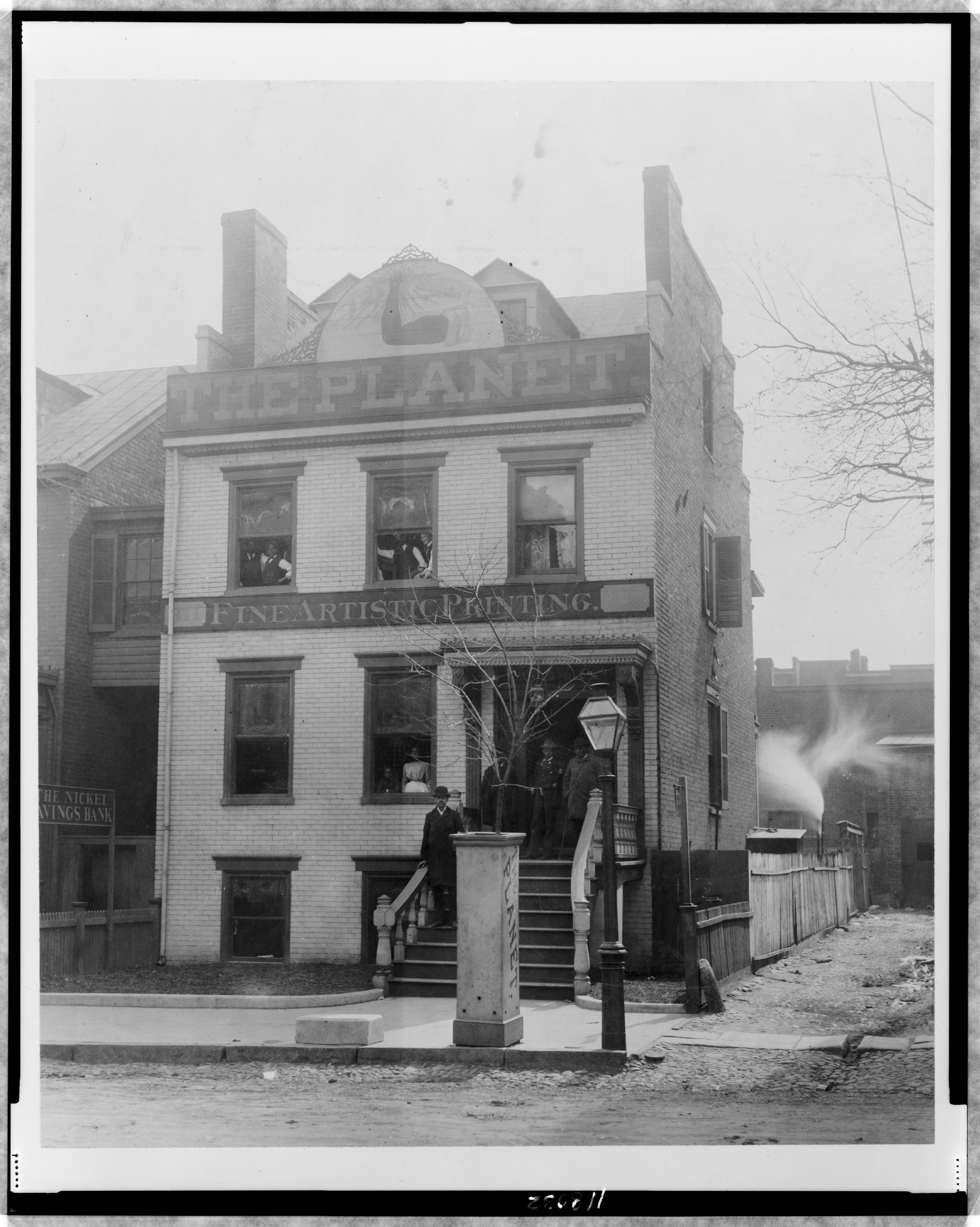
The Planet publishing house

The paper was founded in 1882 by thirteen former slaves – James H. Hayes, James H. Johnston, E. R. Carter, Walter Fitzhugh, George W. Lewis, James E. Robinson, Henry Hucles, Albert V. Norrell, Benjamin A. Graves, James E. Merriweather, Edward A. Randolph, William H. Andrews and Reuben T. Hill. Gathering in an upper room of a building located near the corner of 3rd and Broad Streets, they pooled their meager resources and started America’s oldest African-American newspaper, which was destined to play an important part in molding the opinions of African Americans in not only Richmond but Virginia as a whole, as well as in the nation. It was edited first by Edwin Archer Randolph and then by John Mitchell Jr. from 1884 until his death in 1929. Mitchell was also president of the National Afro-American Press Association and the founder and president of Mechanics Savings Bank. By 1904, The Planet had reached a weekly circulation of 4,200. The paper continued publication until 1938, when it merged with the Richmond Afro-American.

The paper responded to the Racial Integrity Act of 1924. The work of photographer James C. Farley was published in the Planet. Farley served on the board of Mitchell Jr.'s Mechanics Savings Bank.

John Mitchell Jr. was the paper's junior editor in 1912. The same year the paper covered the opening of Lincoln Memorial Hall on the campus of Temperance, Industrial, and Collegiate Institute in Claremont, Virginia.
