= James H. Hayes =

- Born: 1855/1858; Chesterfield County, Virginia
- Died: January 28, 1917; Washington, D.C.
- Education: Howard University School of Law
- Occupations: lawyer, civil rights activist

James H. Hayes (1855/1858 – January 28, 1917) was an American lawyer and civil rights activist primarily active in Richmond, Virginia. He gained national prominence as the leader of legal challenges to the 1902 Virginia State Constitution, which effectively disfranchised many Black Virginians.

Hayes taught in Richmond schools and co-founded the Richmond Planet, an African-American newspaper, in the early 1880s, before he left to attend Howard University School of Law. Following his graduation, Hayes returned to Richmond and served on the Richmond City Council from 1886 to 1890. He was also active in the national civil rights movement, drawing attention for his militant statements and opposition to Booker T. Washington.

== Early life ==
Hayes was born into slavery in 1855 or 1858 in Chesterfield County, Virginia. (Note: Chesson 1982, p. 198 gives a birth year of 1858, citing census records, while other sources, such as Wise 2026, p. 143 cite 1855.) He attended and graduated from the Richmond Colored Normal School.

== Career in Richmond ==
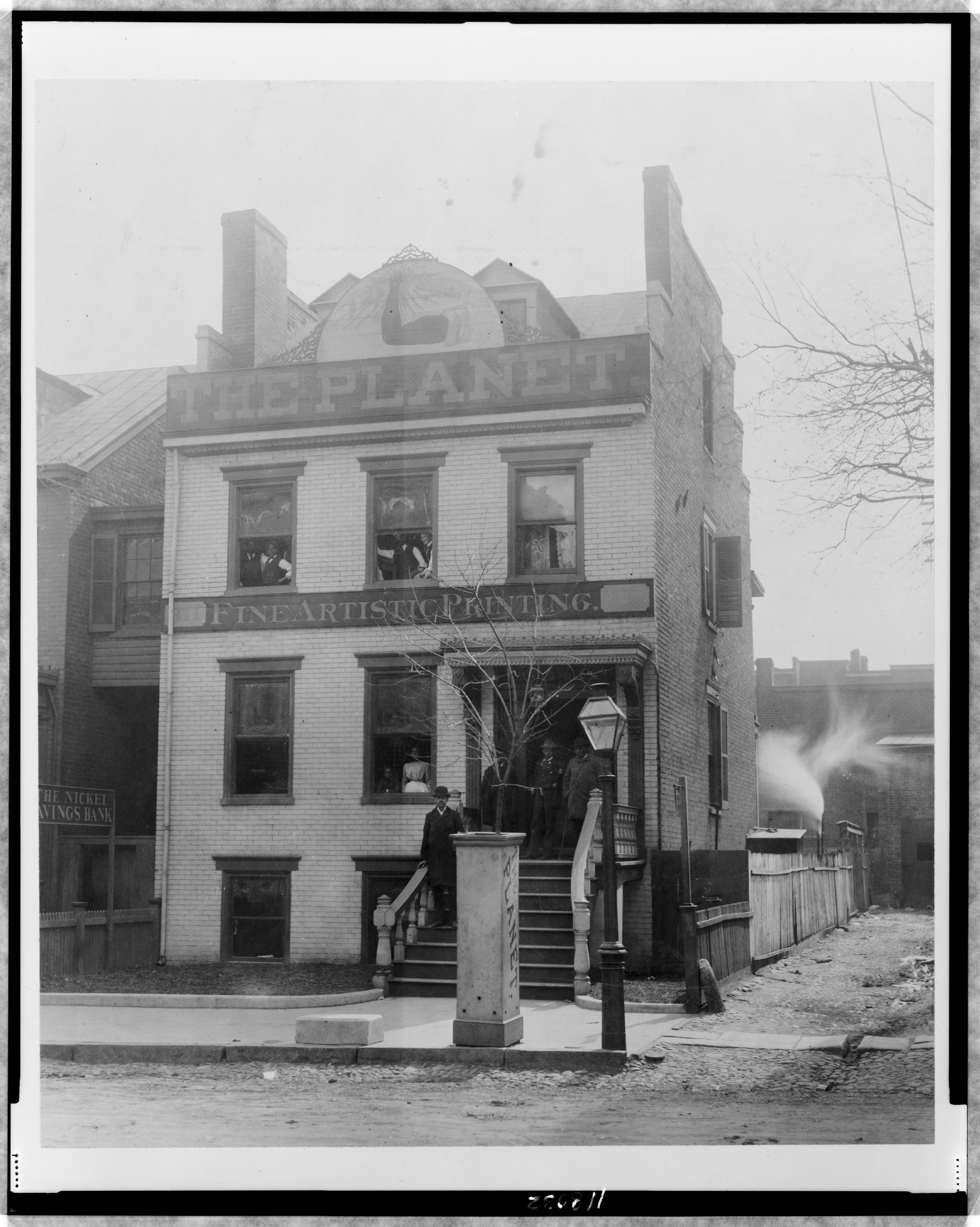
The Richmond Planet publishing house in the 1890s.

By the 1880s, he was working as a teacher at the Navy Hill School in Richmond. In 1882, Hayes was promoted to principal of the Valley School, for a one-year term from 1883 to 1884. Hayes was one of three African American men to be made principles of schools in Richmond for that year. While Hayes was president, Maggie Mitchell (later Maggie Walker) began working at the Valley School. He was removed (Note: Some sources state that Hayes was fired from the school district.) at the end of the term, after the political majority on the school board shifted to the Democratic Party, and continued to teach in the school system.

In 1883, Hayes was involved in the founding of the Richmond Planet, an African American newspaper. He was one of the first reporters on the paper's staff. Also that year Hayes was involved in the foundation of the Acme Literary Association, which aimed to hold public discussions and lectures on "questions of vital importance". He served as the organization's first president. He left Richmond in 1884, to enter the Howard University School of Law. Hayes graduated from Howard in 1885, at the top of his class.

Hayes returned to Richmond, where he was elected to a seat on the Richmond City Council in 1886, representing the Jackson Ward. While on the City Council, Hayes was involved in the chartering of the Lynchburg Baptist Seminary (now known as the Virginia University of Lynchburg).

He lost re-election in 1890. The editor of the Richmond Planet, John Mitchell Jr., supported the candidate who defeated him. While Mitchell had been editor and held de facto control of the paper since 1884, Hayes and co-founders R. A. Paul and E. A. Randolph retained their ownership shares. Shortly after losing re-election, Hayes and Paul sued Mitchell over control of the paper. While the case was dismissed, the paper went bankrupt in 1892. Hayes, Paul, and Randolph sought to purchase it at auction over Mitchell, but were unsuccessful.

Hayes became one of few Black lawyers of his time to try cases at beyond the local court level in the state of Virginia through his defense of William Muscoe in Muscoe v. Commonwealth. Muscoe, a black man, was accused, and initially convicted, of an 1888 murder of a white policeman in Charlottesville. The Virginia Supreme Court of Appeals found that the jury had received "prejudicial instructions", a reversible error that necessitated a retrial. Muscoe was again found guilty and a second appeal denied.

Hayes ran unsuccessfully against Mitchell to be a city alderman in 1892.

== Voting rights in Virginia ==
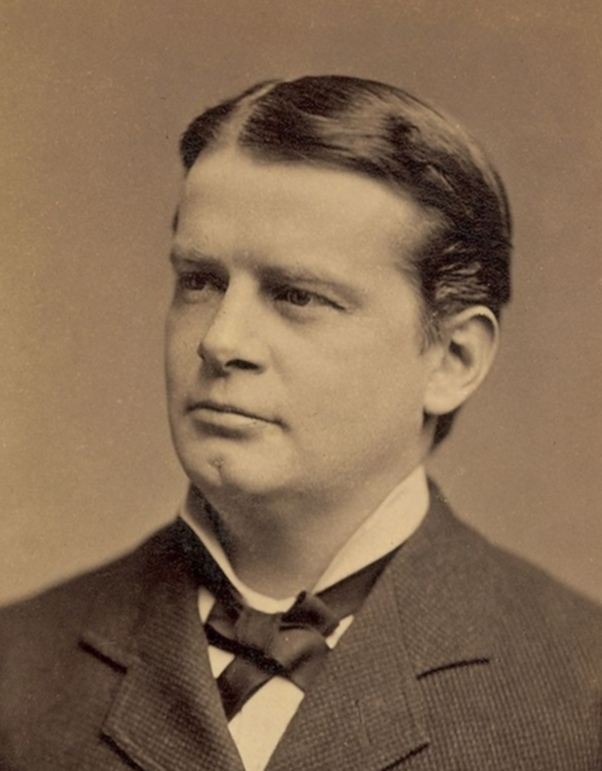
John Sargeant Wise

Hayes moved to Washington, D.C., around 1898. He remained active in Virginia politics, and in 1901 was placed in charge of preparing for the legal fight that the Negro Educational and Industrial Association of Virginia (NEIAV) anticipated waging against changes to the state constitution that would restrict voting rights. By this point, the historian Robert Volney Riser writes, voting rights "had become a full time occupation" for Hayes, and it would remain so for several years. By 1902, Hayes had enlisted John Sergeant Wise and two other white lawyers to assist him in legal challenges against the state. He had further plans to hire three Black attorneys, and fundraise fifty thousand dollars. As expected, the 1902 Virginia State Constitution, which took force in May, instituted a poll tax and literacy test as requirements for voting eligibility. This constitution was not ratified by the people, and instead a constitutional convention, led by Governor Andrew Jackson Montague proclaimed that it would take effect.

The NEIAV, led by Hayes and Wise, was filed two legal challenges in the District Court for the Eastern District of Virginia on November 14. Hayes, who had been advised by the likes of Whitefield McKinlay and James Clarkson to exercise care in his legal filings and hirings, was optimistic about his odds, writing that US Senator George F. Hoar had expressed interest in handling the legislation, and anticipating that he would be able gain the public support of Senator Mark Hanna.

However, the legal arguments that Hayes and Wise filed were not sound. Riser describes the two as having been "brilliant publicists, but the finer points of legal strategy often escaped them", and argued that "strategic missteps" allowed judges to more easily rule against the filings. The main arguments that the two made were (1) that the 1902 House elections should not be certified as they occurred under a constitution that illegitimately deprived Black citizens of voting rights, and (2) that the revised constitution was not valid at all as it had not been ratified and was only proclaimed. The courts were not receptive to either of these arguments: the former considered was a political question and not justiciable; while precedent did not support their latter claims that a constitution needed to be ratified. Riser concludes that these arguments were doomed to defeat. Wise argues that Hayes, recognizing the unfavorable climate in the courts, selected Wise in part for his ability to draw publicity to the cause.

The cases were referred to the Court of Appeals for the Fourth Circuit, where Melville Fuller, the Chief Justice of the United States, heard oral arguments in late November. On November 28, Hayes delivered an impassioned speech where he stated that "[i]t is no secret" that the Constitutional Convention had intended to disfranchise Black voters. Hayes asked:

What, then, is to become of the Negro? We can’t go away anywhere. We want to stay here and we want to know what we are. We want to know if we are men in name only... If Virginians can create a class and tear down the electorate of 100,000 citizens, as true and good men as she has on her roll of citizenship, then God is not fair. Tear him from heaven, for there is no God.

—

Later that day, Fuller dismissed the lawsuits, determining that issues at question were not justiciable in a federal court. While they waited for appeals of this decision to be heard, Wise and Hayes attempted to make their case via alternative avenues. Wise and Hayes met separately with the US House Committee on Elections, US Representative Edgar D. Crumpacker, and US president Theodore Roosevelt to challenge the legitimacy of the election of Virginia representatives to no avail. They also distributed generic forms to a number of Black Virginians that could be used to file lawsuits claiming damages as a result of their disfranchisement. Some 48 lawsuits were filed from these forms.

=== National advocacy ===
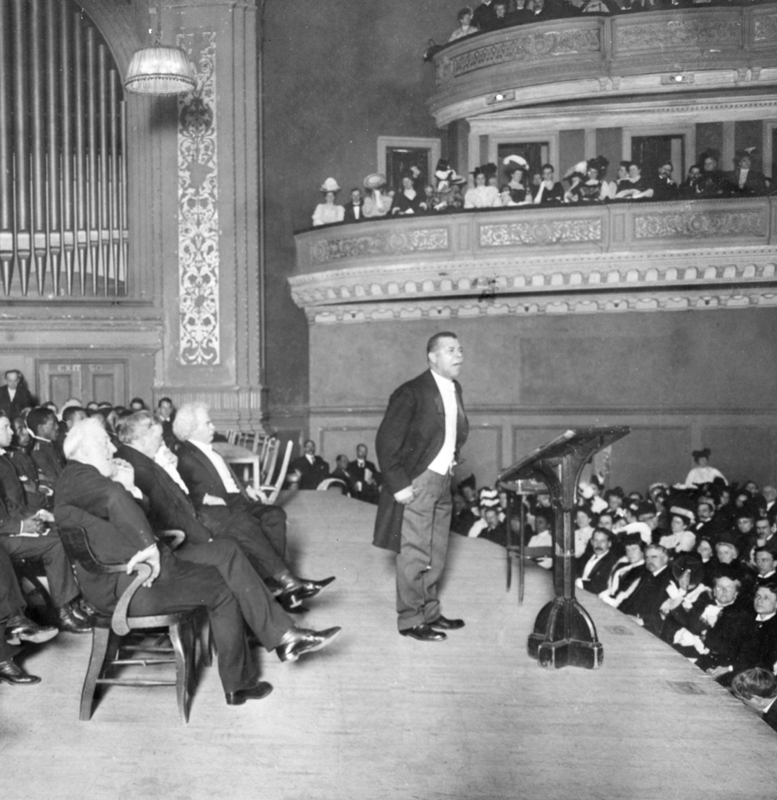
Booker T. Washington speaking, 1906

In 1902, Hayes co-founded the National Negro Suffrage League (NNSL), which he also served as the president of. Booker T. Washington felt Hayes and the NNSL were too radical, and he initially encouraged the African-American press to negatively report on the organization, and after about a year began advocating denying the organization any coverage. Hayes, worried that Washington was working against the NNSL and his ongoing voting rights lawsuits, initially adopted a conciliatory approach, writing to Washington in February 1903 that "Should God call you now, yours would be among the few immortal names which will never die." Nevertheless, Washington remained steadfast in his opposition to the NNSL and its attempts to hold a national convention on Black suffrage, and was never willing to work with Hayes.

In January 1903, Hayes gave a speech at a meeting sponsored by the National Afro-American Council (AAC) on "The Disenfranchisement of the Afro-Americans of Virginia and What They Have Done to Resist It," in which he advocated for "if necessary stand[ing] up for your rights and be[ing] killed for standing up", and warned that "the oppressing, shooting, murdering, burning, lynching, jim crowing, and disfranchising of the Negro will breed a race of Nat Turners, and the sword and torch will devastate and dissolve the South." This speech drew national attention for its seeming militant bent which concerned some white Americans. In response, Hayes himself clarified that he was not seriously advocating for armed violence, while some of his rivals sought to use the incident to their advantage, and other civil rights activists gave public statements distancing themselves from his rhetoric.

The speech heightened Hayes's national profile, and he embarked on a national speaking tour that sought to draw attention to and fundraise for his legal challenges against Virginia's constitution. He delivered speeches at locations including Faneuil Hall in Boston (February 12), Cooper Union (February) and the Academy of Music (April 3) in New York City, in Rochester (late April, with Susan B. Anthony). Although Hayes and Wise would continue to file lawsuits against disfranchisement into 1905, their cases were repeatedly rejected, including by the Supreme Court of Virginia, and never saw any success.

== Later career ==
Hayes wrote a charter for the St Luke Penny Savings Bank (founded 1903), with Maggie Walker as its first president, making her the nation's only female bank president. He also wrote for the St. Luke Herald, edited the Negro Advocate, and was an attorney for the Independent Order of St. Luke. In 1904, he met with US President Theodore Roosevelt as the head of the NNSL. The NNSL became less influential after 1904, and many members joined the AAC instead. On the national level, Hayes was also known for his opposition to Booker T. Washington's approach to civil rights advocacy.

In April 1905, it was reported in several newspapers that Roosevelt had appointed Hayes to be the US consul to Guadeloupe, which would have made him the only Black person working for the state department's consular services. However, other individuals claimed that they had been offered the same position, and several weeks later the State Department clarified that Hayes was not appointed. The New York Age and Richmond Times-Dispatch reported that Hayes and several other Black Virginians were offered, but turned down, the position, which was eventually filled by G. Jarvis Bowen. During the 1912 presidential election, Hayes was named the director of the Bull Moose Party's "Colored Bureau".

== Personal life ==
Hayes and his wife, Julia Harris, had at least two sons, including George Edward Chalmer Hayes, and a son who died in 1916 while attending Howard University.

James Hayes died on January 28, 1917, in Washington. His funeral was held on February 6, in Richmond.

== Scholarly assessment ==
Riser describes Hayes as in 1903 being "disfranchisement's most widely known nemesis at the bar." Historian August Meier wrote that Hayes was one of two Southern lawyers who Meier knew openly opposed Washington. The legal scholar and historian Samuel N. Pincus, in his 1990 study of The Virginia Supreme Court, Blacks, and the Law, described Hayes' efforts as proving "that a black attorney could act with skill and courage in defending a fellow black man in a hostile environment."

== Bibliography ==
- Alexander, Ann Field (2002). Race man : the rise and fall of the "fighting editor," John Mitchell, Jr. University of Virginia Press. ISBN 978-0-8139-2116-7.
- Alexander, Shawn Leigh (2013). An Army of Lions: The Civil Rights Struggle Before the NAACP. University of Pennsylvania Press. ISBN 978-0-8122-2244-9.
- Carle, Susan D. (2015). Defining the Struggle: National Organizing for Racial Justice, 1880-1915. Oxford University Press. ISBN 978-0-19-023524-6.
- Chesson, Michael B. (1982). "Richmond's Black Councilmen, 1871–1896". In Rabinowitz, Howard (ed.). Southern Black Leaders of the Reconstruction Era. University of Illinois Press. pp. 191–222. ISBN 0-252-00972-X.
- Factor, Robert L. (1970). The Black Response to America: Men, Ideals, and Organization, from Frederick Douglass to the NAACP. Addison-Wesley Publishing Company. LCCN 76-111950.
- Foltinek, Selina; Hoepker, Karin; Horn, Katrin (2025). Speculative endeavors: Cultures of knowledge and capital in the long nineteenth century. Manchester University Press. ISBN 978-1-5261-8214-2.
- Gable, John Allen (1978). The Bull Moose Years: Theodore Roosevelt and the Progressive Party. National University Publications. ISBN 0-8046-9187-8.
- Green, Hilary (2016). Educational Reconstruction : African American Schools in the Urban South, 1865-1890. Fordham University Press. doi:10.1515/9780823270149. ISBN 978-0-8232-7016-3. OCLC 940935887.
- Harlan, Lous R. (1986) [1983]. Booker T. Washington: The Wizard of Tuskegee, 1901–1915 (paperback ed.). Oxford University Press. ISBN 0-19-504229-8.
- Hoffman, Steven J. (2017). Race, Class and Power in the Building of Richmond, 1870-1920. McFarland. ISBN 978-0-7864-8084-5.
- Marlowe, Gertrude Woodruff (2003). A Right Worthy Grand Mission: Maggie Lena Walker and the quest for Black economic empowerment. Howard University Press. ISBN 0-88258-211-9.
- Meier, August (1988) [1963]. Negro Thought in America, 1880-1915: Racial Ideologies in the Age of Booker T. Washington. University of Michigan Press. ISBN 978-0-472-06118-1.
- Pincus, Samuel Norman (1990). The Virginia Supreme Court, Blacks, and the Law 1870–1902. Distinguished Studies in American Legal and Constitutional History. Garland Publishing. ISBN 0-8240-0046-3. Revised from the PhD thesis of the same title (1978, University of Virginia, ProQuest 7903541).
- Randolph, Lewis A.; Tate, Gayle T. (2003). Rights for a Season: The Politics of Race, Class, and Gender in Richmond, Virginia. University of Tennessee Press. ISBN 978-1-57233-224-9.
- Riser, Robert Volney, II (2010). Defying Disenfranchisement: Black Voting Rights Activism in the Jim Crow South. Louisiana State University Press. ISBN 978-0-8071-3638-6.
- Smith Jr., J. Clay (1999). Emancipation: The Making of the Black Lawyer, 1844-1944. University of Pennsylvania Press. ISBN 978-0-8122-1685-1.
- Wise, H. Alexander (2026). "The Forgotten Fight to Save Black Suffrage in Virginia, 1902–1904". The Virginia Magazine of History and Biography. 134 (2): 138–180. ISSN 0042-6636.
