= Maggie L. Walker National Historic Site =

Historic house in Virginia, US

- Maggie Lena Walker House
- U.S. National Register of Historic Places
- U.S. National Historic Landmark
- U.S. National Historic Site
- U.S. National Historic Landmark District – Contributing property
- Virginia Landmarks Register
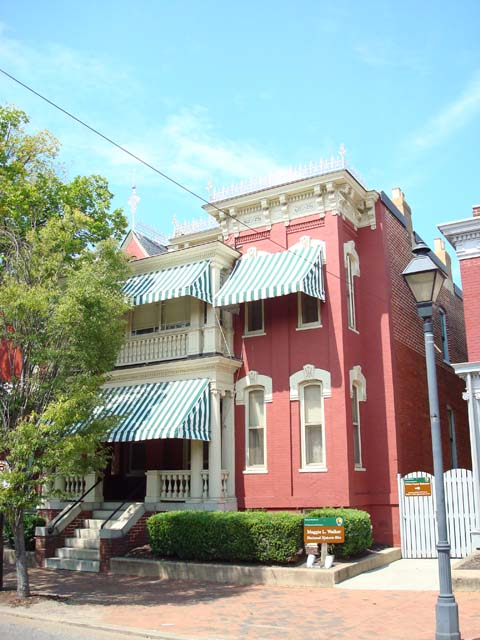
- Maggie L. Walker House

- Location within Virginia Location within the United States
- Location: 110½ E. Leigh St., (Note: Listed in the National Register of Historic Places as 110A E. Leigh St.) Richmond, Virginia
- Coordinates: 37°32′52″N 77°26′17″W
- Area: 1.29 acres (0.0052 km^{2})
- Built: 1883
- Architectural style: Italianate
- Visitation: 4,657 (2025)
- Website: Maggie L. Walker National Historic Site
- Part of: Jackson Ward Historic District (ID76002187)
- NRHP reference No.: 75002100
- VLR No.: 127-0275

Significant dates
- Added to NRHP: May 12, 1975
- Designated NHL: May 15, 1975
- Designated NHS: November 10, 1978
- Designated NHLDCP: 1976
- Designated VLR: April 15, 1975

The Maggie L. Walker National Historic Site is a National Historic Site in the Jackson Ward neighborhood of Richmond, Virginia. It preserves the home of Maggie L. Walker (1864–1934), the first African-American woman in the United States to charter a bank and serve as its president. The site includes six buildings and covers about a third of a city block. Its centerpiece is Walker's house at 110½ East Leigh Street, which was designated a National Historic Landmark in 1975.

George W. Boyd, a formerly enslaved man, built the Italianate brick rowhouse in 1883. Walker bought it in 1904 and enlarged it from 9 to 28 rooms. After her death, her family kept the house and its contents largely as she had left them.

Following the passage of federal legislation in 1978, the National Park Service bought the house in 1979 and restored it to what it looked like around 1930. The house retains most of its original furnishings. The site opened to the public in 1985 as the first national park devoted to the life of an African-American woman.

== Description ==
The site is in Richmond's historically Black Jackson Ward neighborhood. It consists of six buildings covering about a third of a city block. Apart from the Walker house, the buildings have been adapted to house park facilities, including a museum and visitor center, curatorial storage and offices.

The centerpiece of the site is the Maggie Walker House, a two-story Italianate brick rowhouse (Note: The house's 1975 nomination to the National Register of Historic Places describes it as Victorian Gothic.) on East Leigh Street, around the corner from the park's visitor center on North 2nd Street. A Colonial Revival porch with sunroom above covers the front of the house. About 95 percent of the furnishings are original Walker family pieces.

== History ==
=== Maggie L. Walker ===
Maggie Walker (1864–1934), the daughter of a slave, was an African-American businesswoman and civil rights activist. She led the Independent Order of St. Luke and held leadership roles in the NAACP, the Urban League and the National Association of Colored Women. In 1903 she founded the St. Luke Penny Savings Bank, becoming the first African-American woman in the United States to charter a bank and serve as its president. The bank survived the Great Depression and later became Consolidated Bank & Trust. Walker was also active in philanthropy in Richmond's Black community. She took a prominent part in raising funds to establish the Virginia Industrial School for Colored Girls, later known as the Janie Porter Barrett School.

=== The house ===
George W. Boyd built the house in 1883 as a two-story dwelling with five rooms. Boyd was a formerly enslaved man from Goochland, Virginia, and the father of the physician Sarah Garland Boyd Jones. The first owner of the house was physician James Ferguson. The second owner, physician Robert E. Jones, enlarged it in the 1890s, adding five rooms on the upper floor, an attached kitchen at the rear and a west wing for his medical practice. This gave the house its two front doors.

Walker bought the house in 1904 and had electricity and central heating installed. She moved in with her family the next year. In the 1920s, as her household expanded to include her sons' families, she had the west porch enclosed and a two-story rear wing built. The architect Charles T. Russell designed the alterations and an elevator, which was installed in 1928. By then, Walker was using a wheelchair. The renovations increased the number of rooms from 9 to 28.

After Walker's death in 1934 the house passed to her son Melvin. When he died the following year, it passed to Hattie N. F. Walker, the widow of Walker's other son, Russell. Hattie kept the house and its contents largely as Walker had left them, hoping it would become a museum. In 1975, a group of African-American residents of Richmond formed the Maggie L. Walker Historical Foundation to buy and restore the house. The same year, it became the first historically significant Black-owned building in Richmond to be listed on the National Register of Historic Places, and it was designated a National Historic Landmark. Legislation enacted in 1978 provided for the National Park Service to acquire the house. The agency bought it in 1979 from Walker's granddaughter, Maggie Laura Walker Lewis, for $50,000. The Eastern National Park and Monument Association separately bought the house's contents from her for $27,500 and donated them to the park. The Park Service restored the house to how it looked around 1930, and the site opened to the public in 1985 as the first national park devoted to the life of an African-American woman. In 2025, amid staffing cuts across the National Park Service, Axios reported that the site had cut its house-tour schedule from five days a week to two.

== See also ==
- List of National Historic Landmarks in Virginia
- National Register of Historic Places listings in Richmond, Virginia
