= Lillian Harris Payne =

Lilian Harris Payne (November 22,1867 – March 2, 1952) was the editor of the St. Luke Herald, the newspaper of the Independent Order of St. Luke. She was known as the "right hand" of Maggie Lena Walker, the first African American woman to found a bank. Payne worked with Walker to revive the Independent Order of St. Luke, and was on the Board of Directors of the St. Luke Bank.

== Career ==
Payne began her career as a teacher when she was 16 years old. She met Maggie Lena Walker in the 1890s in the Woman's Union, a cooperative society organized by African American women.

Payne was one of four women selected by Walker to lead the revival of the Independent Order of St. Luke in 1900, and worked there for more than 50 years. Payne became Walker's second in command. She also collaborated with Maggie Lena Walker and Ora Stokes to help African American women register to vote in Richmond. She led the finance committee at St. Luke Bank and was the underwriter for thousands of mortgages in the Black community in Richmond, Virginia.

Payne became editor of the St. Luke Herald, the publication for the Independent Order of St. Luke. The paper focused on political and social issues, in addition to business and membership news. During her tenure, the paper had 100,000 members, with a 30% subscribership amongst Black Richmond families.

== Personal life ==
Payne was born on November 22, 1867 to Henry and Henrietta Harris in Richmond, Virginia. In 1893 she married Winston D. Payne. She was the mother to one son named Winston Jr.

Payne was known in the Richmond community for writing and staging plays and May Queen extravaganzas, and writing and publishing books on these plays. She also held the role of executive secretary of the Associated Charities, a social agency in Richmond.

Payne died on March 2, 1962 at the age of 94.
