= Sarah Garland Boyd Jones =

American physician

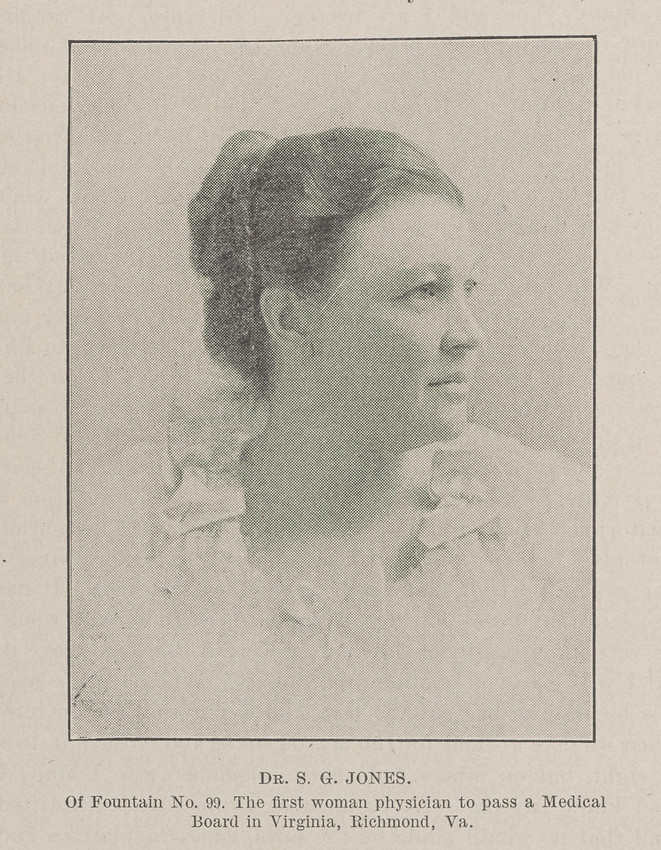
- Born: Sarah Garland Boyd; 1866; Albemarle County, Virginia
- Died: May 11, 1905 (aged 38–39)
- Occupation: Physician
- Spouse: Miles Berkley Jones

Sarah Garland Boyd Jones (née Sarah Garland Boyd; 1866 – May 11, 1905) was an American physician from the U.S. state of Virginia. She was the first African-American woman to receive a certificate from the Virginia State Medical Examining Board and co-founded a hospital in Richmond, Virginia with her husband, Miles Berkley Jones.

== Early life and education ==
Sarah Garland Boyd was born in Albemarle County, Virginia. She was the daughter of Ellen Boyd and George W. Boyd, a leading African American contractor and builder in Richmond, Virginia, remembered for the Maggie L. Walker house. She was educated in the public schools of Richmond, and after graduating in 1883 from Richmond Colored Normal School with Maggie L. Walker, she taught in Richmond schools for five years.

== Career ==
In 1888, Boyd married fellow teacher Miles Berkley Jones, who later became G.W.A. Secretary of the True Reformers. From 1890 to 1893, Jones attended Howard University Medical College, sessions 23 to 25, and graduated as a medical doctor in 1893. She passed the Virginia State Medical Examining Board, receiving over 90 percent on the examination in surgery. Jones was the first African-American woman to receive a certificate from the board; a white woman had passed the examination in 1890. Thereafter, she practiced medicine in Richmond. With her husband, who also became a physician, she opened Richmond Hospital, which was also known as the Women's Central Hospital.

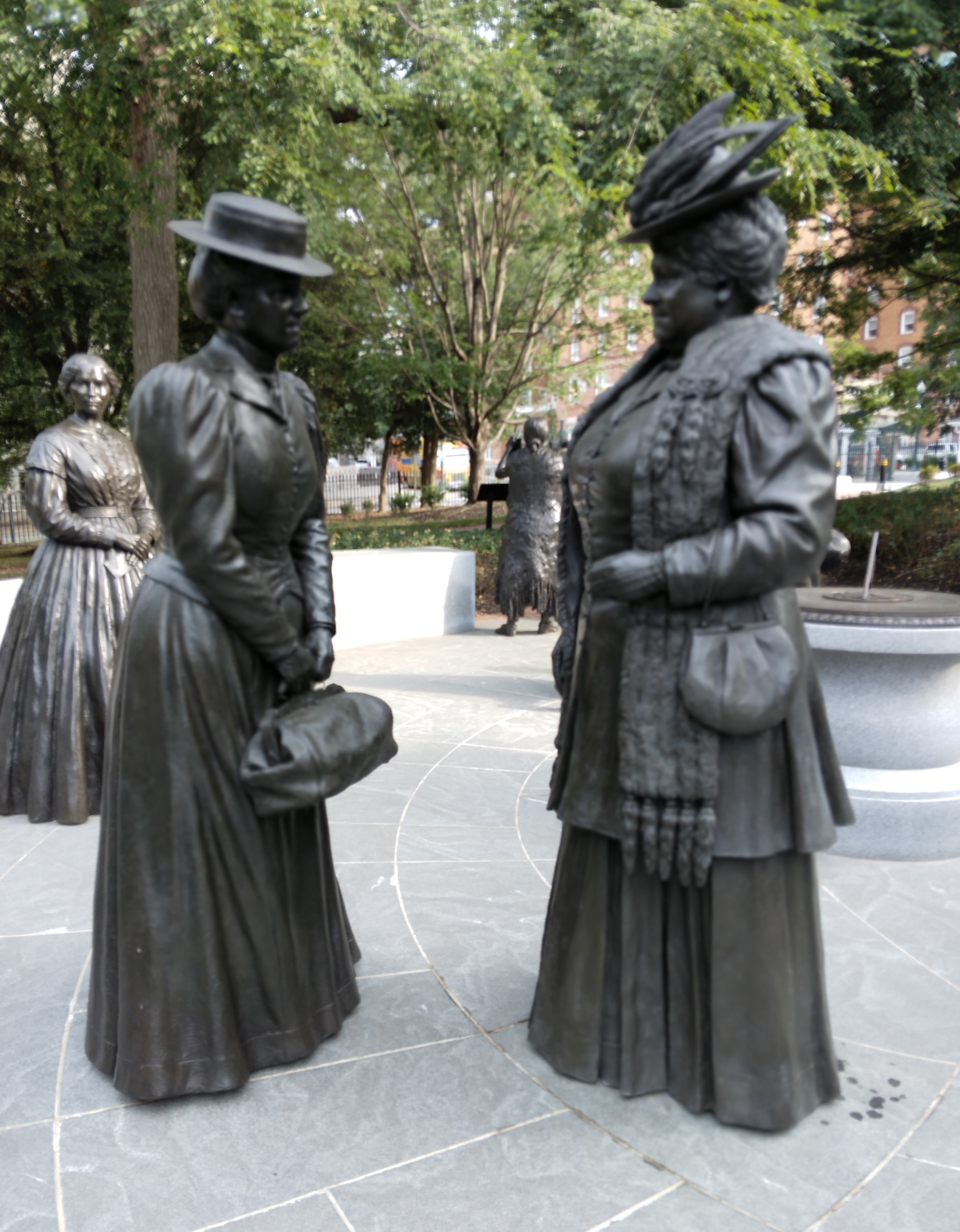
Statues of Sarah Garland Boyd Jones and Maggie L. Walker at the Virginia Women's Monument

== Death ==
Jones died May 11, 1905. Her sister, who also became a physician, married her brother-in-law, the widower, Miles Berkley Jones, The Sarah G. Jones Memorial Hospital, Medical College and Training School for Nurses was named in her honor in 1922.
