= John Jasper =

American ex-slave, minister and public speaker

The Reverend John Jasper
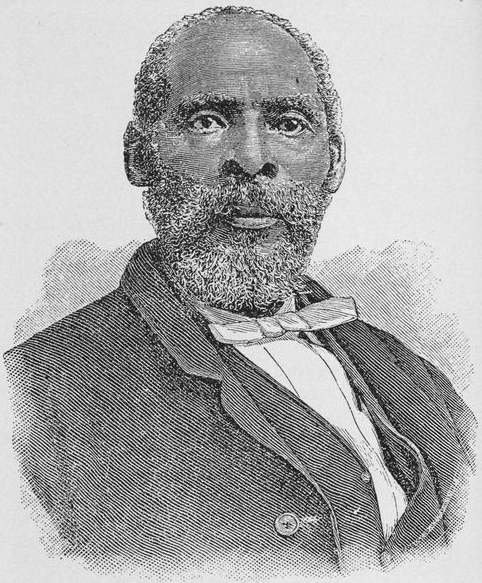
- Born: July 4, 1812; Fluvanna County, Virginia, U.S.
- Died: March 30, 1901 (aged 88)
- Occupation: Baptist minister
- Spouses: Elvy Weaden; Candus Jordan (m. 1844, divorced) Mary Ann Cole (m. 1863; died 1874) Mary Cary (m. 1892; died 1909)
- Children: 9

Signature
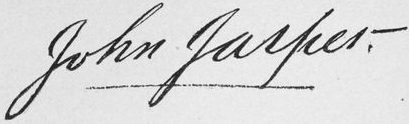

John Jasper (July 4, 1812 – March 30, 1901) was an ex-slave who became a Baptist minister and noted public speaker for Christianity after the American Civil War.

== Early life ==
Born into slavery on July 4, 1812, in Fluvanna County, Virginia, to Philip and Tina Jasper, John was the youngest of their twenty-four children. Philip was a well known Baptist preacher. He and Tina were slaves of the Peachy Estate. Philip died two months before his son John Jasper's birth. Jasper was hired out to various people. When Mrs. Peachy, their mistress died, John was given to her son John Blair Peachy in the division of the estate. He was a lawyer and a farmer by practice who owned large cotton plantations in Louisiana, where he intended to move. Though before the plans for the move were completed, John Blair Peachy died, and John was returned to Richmond, Virginia. Jasper experienced a powerful Christian religious conversion that began in Capital Square in 1839. He was fully persuaded by the power of God that he had been chosen to preach the gospel. In 1840 he presented the evidence of his conversation and regeneration to the brethren of the First African Baptist Church, and thus began preaching the gospel of Jesus Christ. Jasper with the help of a fellow slave, learned to read and write, and was able to read and study the bible.

== Family ==
Jasper married four times, first to Elvy Weaden, in Williamsburg, Virginia. He was sent to the city of Richmond the same night of their marriage, and never allowed to return to Williamsburg to see her again. As a result, she communicated to him by writing expressing her intention to remarry. After seeking and obtaining the permission of his church to remarry himself, he eventually married Candus Jordan in 1844. They had nine children together, before eventually getting divorced. Thirdly he married Mary Ann Cole in 1863. She died on August 6, 1874. On March 24, 1892 John Jasper married Mary Cary.

== Career ==
For more than two decades, while enslaved, Rev. Jasper traveled throughout Virginia, often preaching at funeral services for fellow slaves. He regularly preached at Third Baptist Church in Petersburg, Virginia. He also preached to Confederate Soldiers during the American Civil War (1861–65).

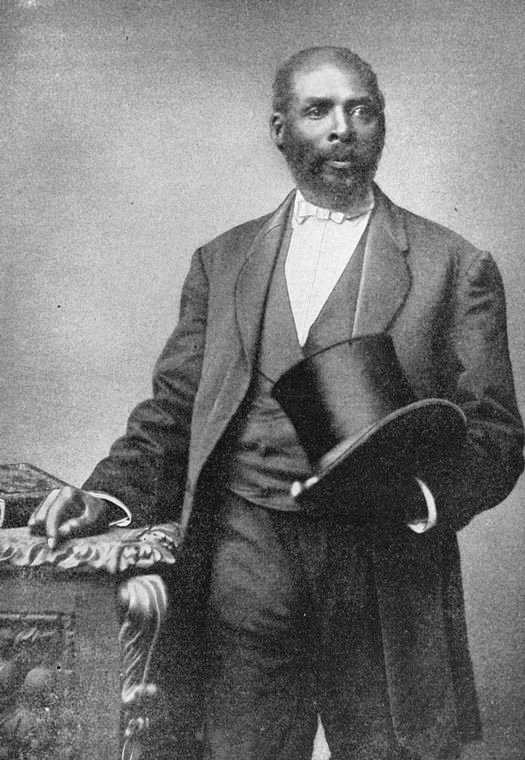
A picture of Jasper published in 1902.

After his own emancipation following the American Civil War, Rev. Jasper founded the Sixth Mount Zion Baptist Church in Richmond, which by 1887 had attracted 2500 members and served as a religious and social center of Richmond's predominantly black Jackson Ward—providing a Sunday School and other services. Jasper's vivid oratory and dramatic speaking style brought renown and calls for him to preach throughout the Eastern United States. His most famous sermon, The Sun Do Move, expressed his deep faith in God through the imagery of a flat Earth above which the sun circuits. He first preached this sermon in March 1878 on the basis of Biblical revelation. Despite his views being contrary to modern scientific theory, he went on to preach this sermon 273 times throughout the U.S., often to thousands of people at once, as well as in London, Paris, and before the Virginia General Assembly.

== Death and legacy ==
John Jasper left a lasting legacy as one of the most respected figures in Richmond's history, especially among the African-American and Southern Baptist communities. He delivered his last sermon a few days before his death at the age of 88. The Library of Virginia honored him as one of the African-American trailblazers in its "Strong Men and Women" series in 2012. The words of his most famous sermon, The Sun Do Move, have since been modernized into standard English from the original Patois. His name is remembered for his unswerving allegiance to the Bible from which he preached.

Historian Edward Guimont has argued that Jasper was hugely influential in spreading the idea of the Flat Earth in the late 19th century US, but that William Carpenter is better remembered by the modern Flat Earth movement despite having far less influence than Jasper at the time.
