= William Carpenter (flat-Earth theorist) =

Flat earth proponent

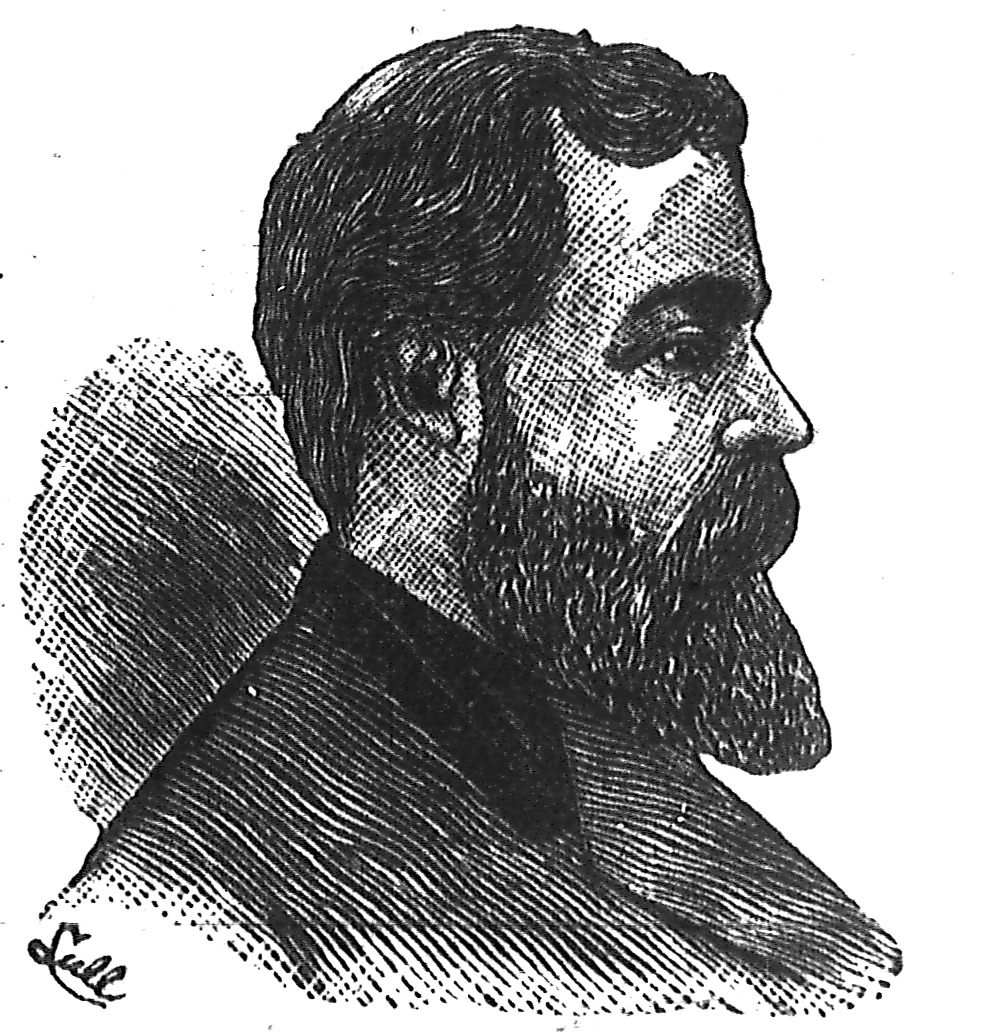
- Born: 25 February 1830; Greenwich, Kent, England
- Died: 1 September 1896 (aged 66); Baltimore, Maryland, United States
- Occupation: Printer
- Known for: Flat Earth proponent and author
- Spouse: Annie Gillett

William Carpenter (25 February 1830 – 1 September 1896) was an English printer and author, and a proponent of the flat Earth hypothesis, active in England and the United States in the nineteenth century. Carpenter immigrated to the United States and continued his advocacy of the Flat Earth movement.

== Life ==
Carpenter was born on 25 February 1830 in Greenwich, Kent, England, and baptised on 30 April 1830 at Maize Hill, formerly known as Bethel – Independent in Greenwich. He was the eldest son of Samuel Carpenter and Lucy Moss. He married Annie Gillett in January–March 1853, and they eventually had six children.

In Greenwich, Carpenter became a printer and stenographer by profession. In 1879, he moved from England to Baltimore, Maryland, where he continued his work as a printer. The 1880 US federal census shows him and his wife Annie with six children aged 11–25 years, whose occupations included milliner, architect, professor of music, and florist.

After arriving in Baltimore, Carpenter taught classes in shorthand. He published two books on the subject and became known as "Professor Carpenter". Carpenter had other eclectic beliefs per his Baltimore Sun obituary. "For many years Mr. Carpenter had also been a vegetarian, a believer in the power of mesmerism and a spiritualist. Upon each of these questions he wrote pamphlets. He thought that the eating of meat was responsible for many of the ills that humanity is heir to."

Carpenter died on Tuesday, 1 September 1896 at 1316 North Central Avenue, his home, in Baltimore. Per his obituary in the Baltimore Sun, his death was the result of "a stroke of apoplexy on Sunday". In the year before his death he had "a number of slighter strokes"

== Advocate of the flat Earth hypothesis ==
Carpenter was a passionate advocate of the flat Earth hypothesis, which holds that the Earth is not a globe.

Carpenter, a printer originally from Greenwich, England, published Theoretical Astronomy Examined and Exposed – Proving the Earth not a Globe in eight parts from 1864 under the name Common Sense. He later emigrated to Baltimore, where he published A Hundred Proofs the Earth is not a Globe in 1885.

Carpenter argued that:

- "There are rivers that flow for hundreds of miles towards the level of the sea without falling more than a few feet — notably, the Nile, which, in a thousand miles, falls but a foot. A level expanse of this extent is quite incompatible with the idea of the Earth's convexity. It is, therefore, a reasonable proof that Earth is not a globe."
- "If the Earth were a globe, a small model globe would be the very best – because the truest – thing for the navigator to take to sea with him. But such a thing as that is not known: with such a toy as a guide, the mariner would wreck his ship, of a certainty!, This is a proof that Earth is not a globe."

Carpenter was a proponent of English writer Samuel Rowbotham (1816–1885), who produced a pamphlet, with Carpenter's assistance, called Zetetic Astronomy in 1849 arguing for a flat Earth and published results of many experiments that tested the curvatures of water over a long drainage ditch, followed by another, called The iIonsistency of Modern Astronomy and its Opposition to the Scripture. Rowbotham also produced studies, mostly printed by Carpenter, that purported to show the effects of ships disappearing below the horizon could be explained by the laws of perspective in relation to the human eye.

== Principal works ==
Some of Carpenter's works found commercial publishers, but many were printed, bound, and sold by himself, at times under the pen-name "Common Sense". An incomplete list includes:

- Communion with 'Ministering Spirits', William Horsall, 1858.
- The Earth not a Globe, by Common Sense (a poem), London: Job Caudwell, 1864.
- Sir Isaac Newton's Theoretical Astronomy Examined and Refuted by Common Sense, n.p., n.d. (c. 1867).
- Something About Spiritualism: a Reply to Professor Airy's Ipswich Lectures to Workingmen, London: Job Caudwell, 1865.
- Theoretical Astronomy Examined and Exposed, London: Job Caudwell, 1866.
- Bosh and Bunkum: Religious Arguments Why the Earth is Not Round, London: Heywood & Co.; William Carpenter, Printer, Greenwich, 1868.
- Theoretical Astronomy Examined and Exposed, 1869.
- The Flying Philosophers, London: British & Colonial Publishing Co., 1871.
- Water, not Convex: the Earth not a Globe! Demonstrated by Alfred Russel Wallace on 5 March 1870, 1871.
- The Bedford Level Experiment, 1872.
- Sense versus Science, 1873.
- Proctor's Planet Earth, 1875.
- Wallace's Wonderful Water, London: Abel Heywood, 1875.
- Mr. Lockyer's Logic: An Exposition of Mr. J. Norman Lockyer's Astronomy, London: 1876.
- The Delusion of the Day, or Dyer's Reply to Parallax, London: Abel Heywood, 1877.
- One Hundred Proofs the Earth is Not a Globe, Baltimore: 1885.
- One Hundred Proofs the Earth is Not a Globe, Baltimore: 1885. Carpenter, William. archive.org

He also published two magazines, Carpenter's Folly, of which only a few issues were printed in 1887, and Shorthand, which was issued from 1893 to 1894.

== Legacy ==
Among the Flat Earth revival of the early 21st century, Carpenter's works, especially One Hundred Proofs, tend to be widely circulated and he is often one of the few pre-21st century Flat Earth advocates remembered. Historian Edward Guimont has argued that this has led to an inflation of how important he was at the time, with Guimont saying that John Jasper was much more influential in spreading the notion of a Flat Earth in the late 19th century US.
