= St. Luke Building =

- U.S. National Register of Historic Places
- Virginia Landmarks Register
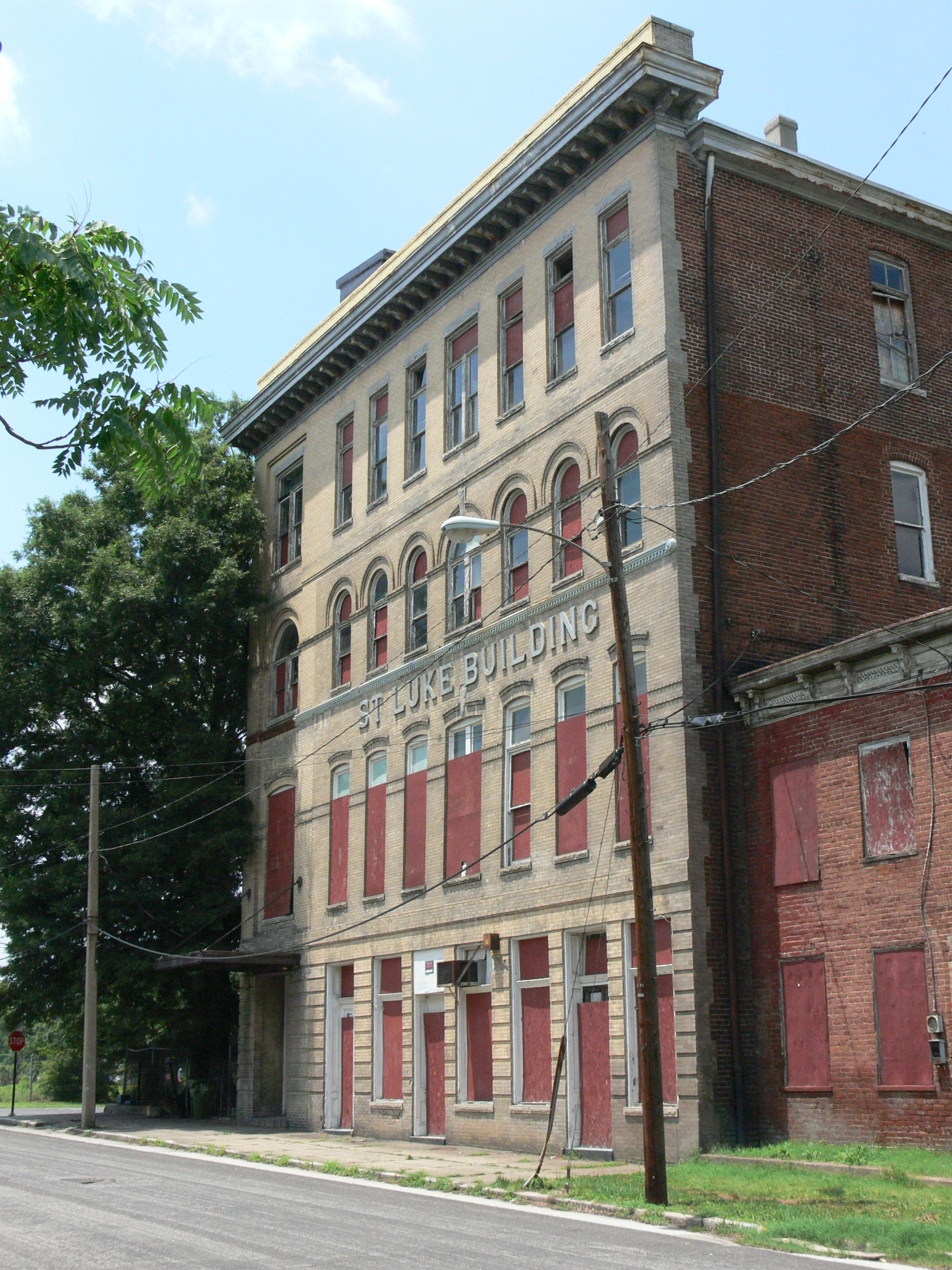
- St. Luke Building, July 2011

- Location within Virginia Location within the United States
- Location: 900 St. James St., Richmond, Virginia
- Coordinates: 37°33′4″N 77°26′15″W
- Area: 0.5 acres (0.20 ha)
- Built: 1902, 1915-1920
- Architect: White, John H.; Russell, Charles T.
- Architectural style: Edwardian
- NRHP reference No.: 82004589 (original); 100003005 (increase)
- VLR No.: 127-0352

Significant dates
- Added to NRHP: September 16, 1982
- Boundary increase: October 5, 2018
- Designated VLR: April 21, 1982

St. Luke Building is a historic office building located in Richmond, Virginia. It was built in 1902, and is a four-story, brick Edwardian style building. The original building was designed by John H. White. It was then remodeled and enlarged in 1915–1920. From its start, the building housed the offices of the Independent Order of St. Luke, an African-American fraternal society headquartered in Richmond.

The remodeled building was designed by Charles Thaddeus Russell, the first Black architect to be licensed in Richmond. It was his first professional commission, when Maggie L. Walker, the head of the Order, asked him to design the building to better support the St. Luke Penny Savings Bank.

The building has a yellow pressed-brick facade and red brick secondary walls. The office of Maggie L. Walker, who helmed the Order from 1899 until her death, is preserved as it was at the time of her death in 1934.

It was listed on the National Register of Historic Places in 1982.
