= Children's Museum of Richmond =

Museum in Richmond, Virginia, US

Coordinates: 37°33′44.7″N 77°28′1.7″W

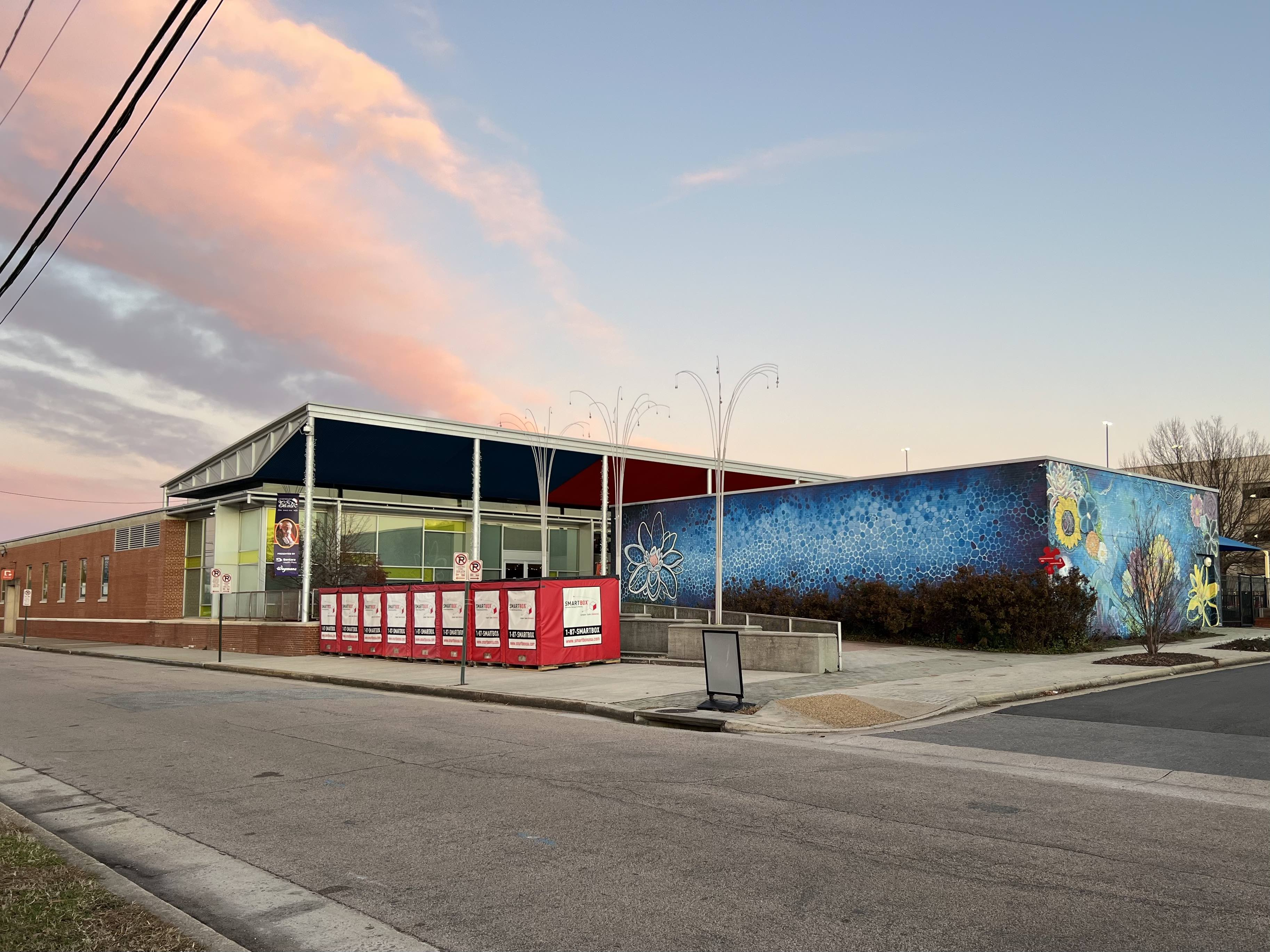
- Established: 1977
- Location: 2626 W Broad St Richmond, Virginia
- Director: Shannon L. Venable
- Website: www.c-mor.org

The Children's Museum of Richmond began in 1977 as the Richmond Children's Museum in the Navy Hill School building in downtown Richmond, Virginia. In 2000, the museum moved to its current location on Broad Street in Richmond. In 2010, the Children's Museum of Richmond became the first in the country to open a satellite location, at West Broad Village in Short Pump, located in the West End of Richmond. The Children's Museum of Richmond opened two other satellites in 2012 and 2014 in Chesterfield, Virginia and Fredericksburg, Virginia. On July 11, 2015, the Short Pump location moved from West Broad Village to Short Pump Town Center. The Short Pump & Fredricksburg locations closed in 2020 due to the COVID-19 pandemic. The Short Pump Town Center location was replaced by Draftcade. The museum is also home of Commonwealth Parenting and the Central Virginia Book Bank.

Highlights of Main Museum include:

- A newly renovated Hospital with a "'life size" operations game, x-ray center, ambulance dispatch center and an ambulance with interactive siren and lights.
- Little Farm, a special area for visitors age 3 and under, to explore!
