= Sixth Mount Zion Baptist Church =

Historic church in Virginia, US

- U.S. National Register of Historic Places
- Virginia Landmarks Register
- Richmond City Historic District
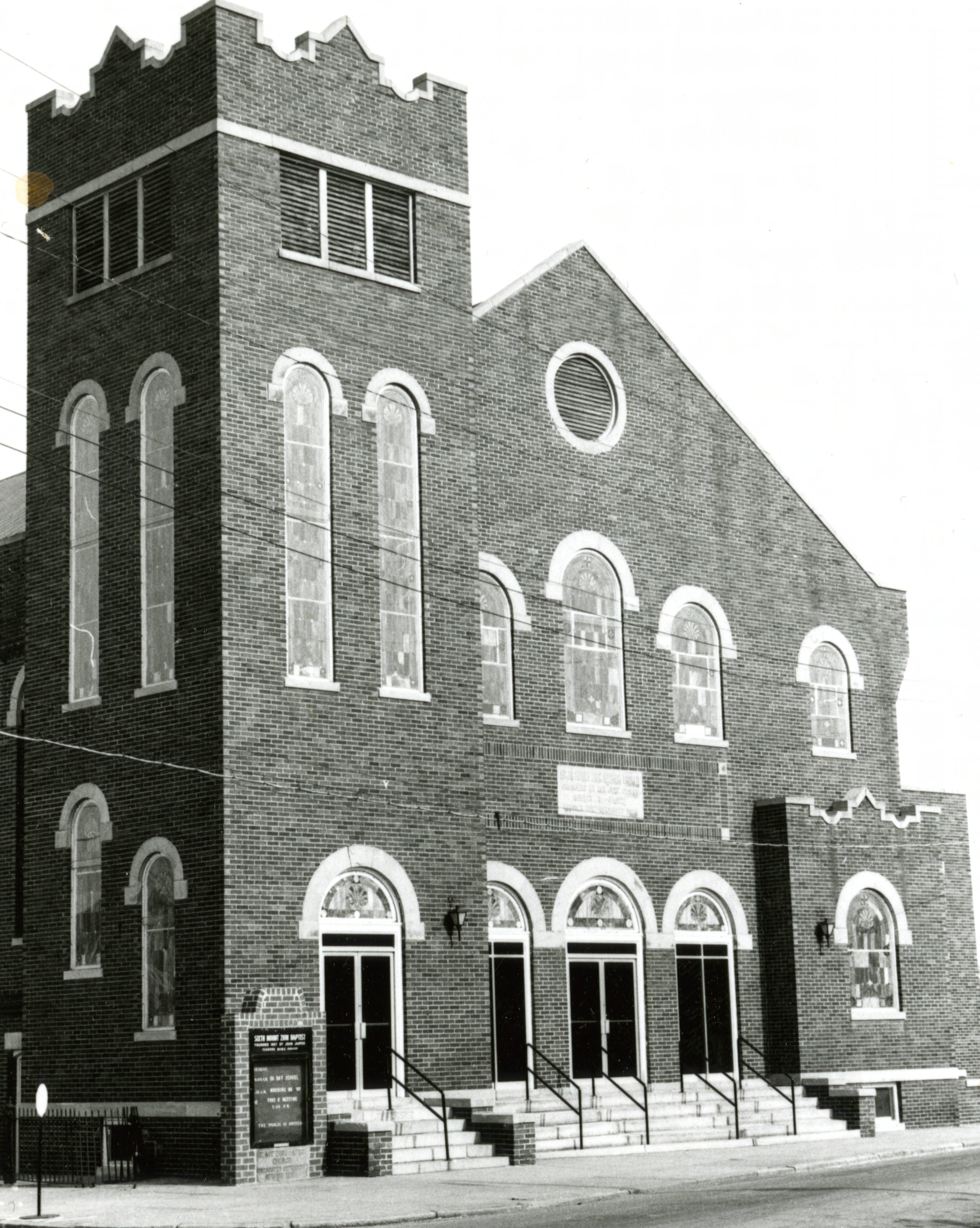
- Sixth Mount Zion Baptist Church, 1978

- Location within Virginia Location within the United States
- Location: 14 W. Duval St., Richmond, Virginia
- Coordinates: 37°33′2″N 77°26′19″W
- Area: 4 acres (1.6 ha)
- Built: 1867, 1925
- Architect: Russell, Charles T.; Boyd, George, et al.
- Architectural style: Late Gothic Revival
- Website: Sixth Mount Zion Baptist Church
- NRHP reference No.: 96001445
- VLR No.: 127-0472

Significant dates
- Added to NRHP: December 16, 1996
- Designated VLR: June 19, 1996

Sixth Mount Zion Baptist Church is a historic African-American Baptist church located in Richmond, Virginia. The church was founded in 1867. It was listed on the National Register of Historic Places in 1996.

== History ==
=== Background ===
The sanctuary was started in 1867 by John Jasper. The church began as a confederate horse stable which was situated on Brown's Island. The church congregation moved to 14 Duval Street in 1869, and in the 1880s a sanctuary was added by George W. Boyd.

In 1878 Jasper delivered his controversial "De Sun Do Move" (The Sun Do Move) sermon at the church.

=== Structure ===
It is a two-story, Late Gothic Revival style stuccoed brick structure. It features a large off-center tower that houses the church bell in belfry and accommodates a large stairwell to the gallery. Attached to the sanctuary is the two-level Jasper Memorial Education Annex added in 1925.

=== Expansion ===
In 1925, the church was remodeled and extended by an African American architect named Charles Thaddeus Russell.
