= Daniel Barclay Williams =

American educator (1861–1895)

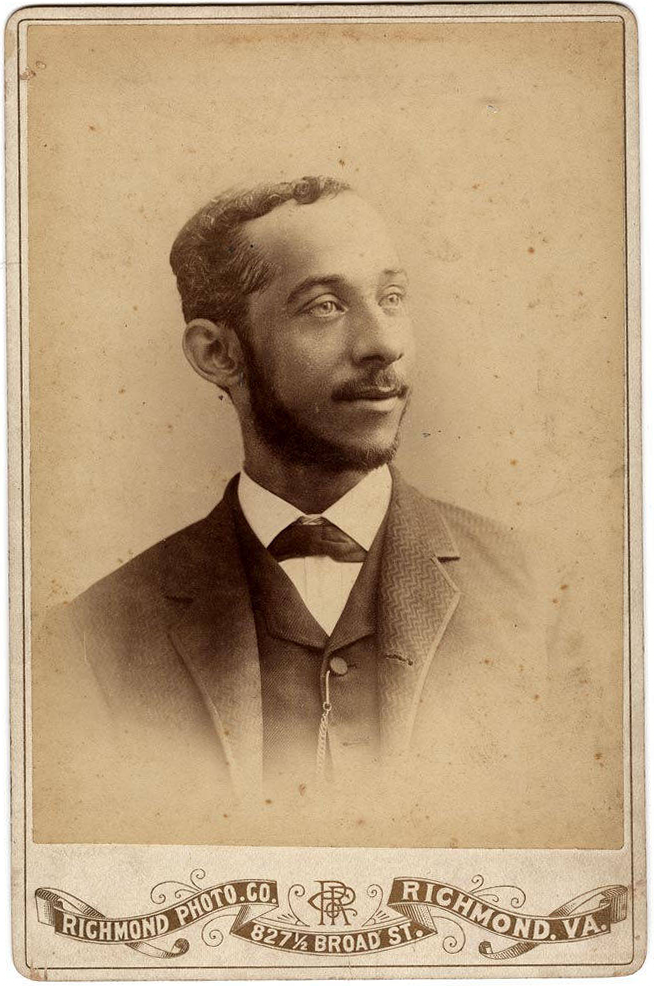
- Born: November 22, 1861
- Died: July 27, 1895 (aged 33); Petersburg, Virginia, U.S.
- Occupation: Educator
- Children: 1

Signature
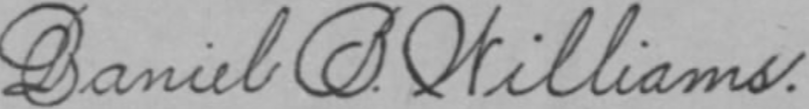

Daniel Barclay Williams (November 22, 1861 – July 27, 1895) was an American educator who worked at the Virginia Normal and Collegiate Institute, making him the first Black teacher of classics in the state.

== Early life ==
Daniel Barclay Williams was born on November 22, 1861, to a mother who the African American National Biography says was "apparently" single, in Richmond, Virginia. He graduated from Richmond Colored High and Normal School in 1877. While there, he was helped by Mary Elizabeth Knowles, the school's principal until 1876, and Ralza Morse Manly, who succeeded her, and earned a gold medal for "excellence in scholarship and conduct". He was a talented swimmer. Three years later he graduated from Worcester Academy. Williams attended Brown University, for a year in 1880. He may have left because of financial issues, and returned to Richmond. He continued to study while there.

== Career ==
In 1881, Williams worked at the First Baptist Church Sabbath School as an assistant superintendent, a post he had left by 1882. Two years later he found a job teaching in the Henrico County Public Schools. Williams left that post to teach from March to June 1885 in Richmond at the Moore Street Industrial School. Later that year he was hired to teach classics, math, science and the "art of teaching" at the Virginia Normal and Collegiate Institute (later Virginia State University). He worked in that role until 1887, when he was made professor of ancient languages, a post he held until his death. From 1891 to 1895 he was the department's dean. Williams' work at the Virginia Institute made him the state's first Black classics teacher. He published works and used other books by Black authors, such as William Sanders Scarborough. The Rutgers University Database of Classical Scholars describes Williams as having been "a one man department". He was also active in the Virginia Teachers Association, chairing its executive committee from 1889 to 1892 and serving as president in 1892.

He taught in the Navy Hill School in Richmond, Virginia, during the 1880s. Navy Hill was one of four schools in the city's segregated school system for Black children and the only to have any Black teachers.

He could read French, German, Hebrew, Latin, and Greek. Williams published The Negro Race: The Pioneers in Civilization (1883), a book arguing that Black civilizations in Africa had influenced the development of Greece and Rome and had been equally "civilized", as well as highlighting the successes of freed Black people in the United States after their emancipation. He was further published in The Industrial Herald and Richmond Planet and wrote several other books; he was also a devout Christian practicing biblical literalism. Williams' 1887 Science, Art, and Methods of Teaching later became a textbook. His book Freedom and Progress, originally published in 1890, went through several editions. These publications made Williams the first faculty member of the Virginia Institute to have written and published a book. Livingstone College awarded him an honorary MA in 1889, and Shaw University a PhD two years later.

== Personal life ==
Williams was married and had one child.

He died on July 27, 1895, while getting an operation in Petersburg, Virginia. James H. Holmes oversaw his funeral. His papers are held in the Johnston Memorial Library of Virginia State University.

== Bibliography ==
- Alexander, Ann Field (2002). Race man : the rise and fall of the "fighting editor," John Mitchell, Jr. Charlottesville : University of Virginia Press. ISBN 978-0-8139-2116-7.
