= Maggie L. Walker =

African-American businesswoman (1864–1934)

Maggie Lena Walker
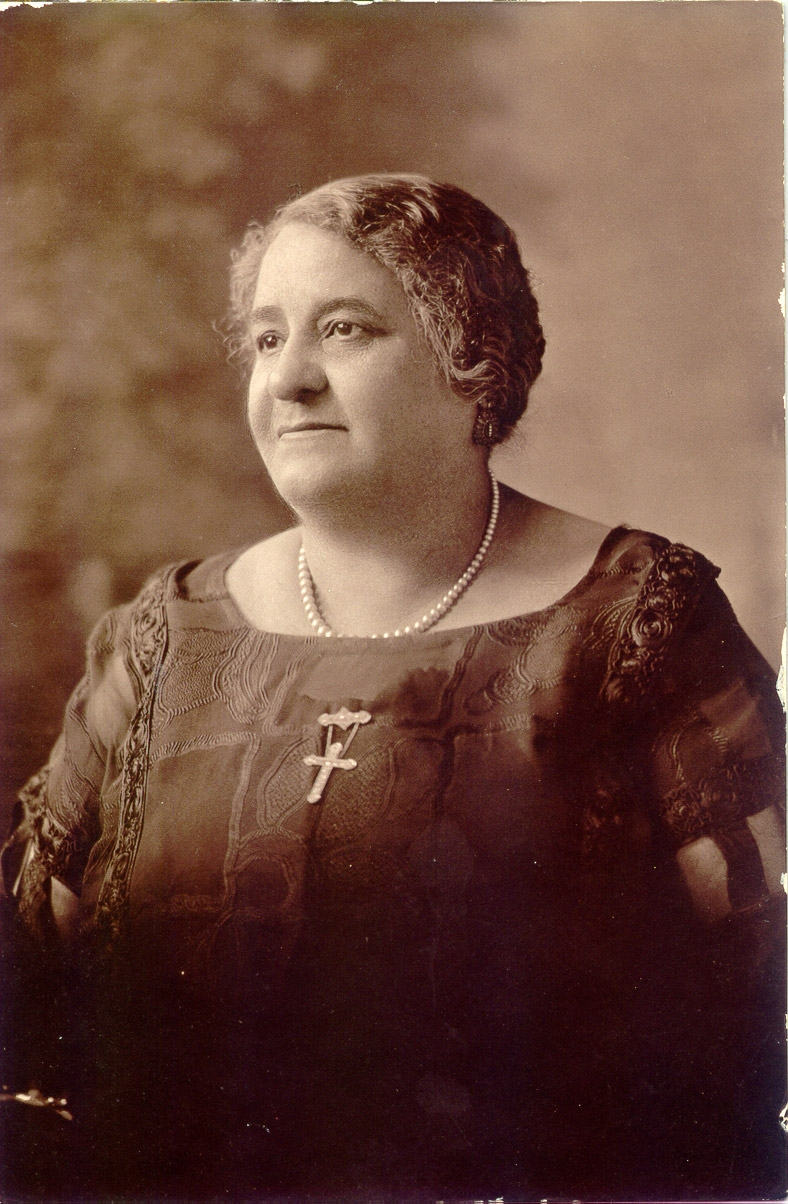
- Born: Maggie Lena Draper; July 15, 1864; Richmond, Virginia, U.S.
- Died: December 15, 1934 (aged 70); Richmond, Virginia, U.S.
- Occupations: Bank founder, businessperson, teacher, newspaper publisher.
- Known for: First African-American woman to charter a bank in the United States

Maggie Lena Walker (née Draper Mitchell; July 15, 1864 – December 15, 1934) was an American businessperson and teacher. In 1903, Walker became both the first African-American woman to charter a bank and the first African-American woman to serve as a bank president. As a leader, Walker achieved successes with the vision to make tangible improvements in the way of life for African Americans. Disabled by paralysis and a wheelchair user later in life, Walker also paved the way for people with disabilities.

Along with her leadership of the Independent Order of St. Luke, Maggie Walker was also involved with the NAACP, The National Association of Colored Women, the National Urban League and National Negro Business League, and the United Order of Tents.

Walker's restored and furnished home in the historic Jackson Ward neighborhood of Richmond, Virginia has been designated a National Historic Site, operated by the National Park Service.

== Childhood ==
Maggie Lena Draper was born on July 15, 1864, the daughter of Elizabeth Draper and Eccles Cuthbert. (Note: She was previously thought by most scholars to have been born in 1867 until 2009. When she married Armistead Walker Jr. in 1886, her birth year was stated to be 1864.) Her mother, a former slave, was an assistant cook at the Van Lew estate in Church Hill of Richmond, Virginia, where she met Cuthbert, an Irish American journalist for the New York Herald, based in Virginia. There is no record of a marriage between Draper and Cuthbert. Draper was employed by Elizabeth Van Lew, an abolitionist and philanthropist who had been a spy for the Union during the Civil War (1861–1865) in the Confederate capital city of Richmond. Draper married William Mitchell, a butler at the Van Lew estate, soon after Maggie Walker's birth. In 1870, Maggie's half-brother, Johnnie Mitchell was born to Elizabeth and William Mitchell.

After William Mitchell became headwaiter at the Saint Charles Hotel, the Mitchell family moved to their own home on College Alley off Broad Street, near Miss Van Lew's home, where Walker and her half-brother Johnnie were raised. The house was near the First African Baptist Church which, like many black churches at the time, was an economic, political, and social center for the local black community. After the untimely death of William Mitchell, Walker's mother supported her family by working as a laundress. Walker attended the newly formed Richmond Public Schools and helped her mother by delivering clean clothes. Starting in first grade, Walker attended the Valley School where she studied for an estimated eight years. She then went on to the Navy Hill School for two years, and the Richmond Colored Normal School for her final year of schooling.

When she was fourteen years old, Walker joined the local council of the Independent Order of St. Luke. This fraternal organization was originally established as a burial society in 1867 in Baltimore, Maryland by Mary Prout. The Independent Order of St. Luke ministered to the sick and aged, promoted humanitarian causes, and provided long-term economic and social support in the post-slavery, Reconstruction-era United States by acting cooperatively to provide African Americans with access to education, healthcare, banking, and insurance, among other services.

Walker graduated from the Richmond Colored Normal School in 1883, part of the segregated Richmond public school system. The black students were to receive diplomas in a church, while white students would walk in a theater. The black seniors protested at the split graduation and the choice of a church as their venue, and their principal informed them they could only combine events if seating was segregated. The students decided to graduate from their school's auditorium, and attendee Wendell Dabney claimed that this was "the first school strike of Negroes in America." Ten students graduated from the Richmond Colored Normal School that year, including Walker, Dabney, and businessperson Mary Burrell.

== Teaching career ==
After graduating high school, she taught for three years at her former school, the Valley School, also known as the Lancasterian School for a wage of thirty-five dollars a month. Her employment ended once she was married, in accordance with school policy against employing married women.

== Women's Union ==
While working at Valley School, she also worked part-time as an insurance agent with the Woman's Union and took night classes in accounting. The Woman's Union (WU) was a cooperative organization of women engaged in businesses to meet the needs of Richmond Virginia's black community.

== Independent Order of St. Luke ==
After leaving her teaching position in 1886, Walker devoted herself to the Order and rose steadily through its ranks. She served in numerous capacities of increasing responsibility for the Order, from that of a delegate to the biannual convention to the top leadership position of Right Worthy Grand Secretary in 1899. Walker saved the Independent Order of St. Luke from the brink of collapse after the financial mismanagement of its previous leader, William Forester, doubling the number of members within her first year at the top. Walker's social change activities with the Independent Order of St. Luke demonstrated her keen consciousness of oppression and her dedication to challenge racial and gender injustice.

A pioneering insurance executive, financier and civic icon, she established the Juvenile Branch of the Order in 1895 while serving as grand deputy matron. This branch encouraged education, community service, and thrift in young members.

Maggie L. Walker served as the leader of the order until her death in 1934. Soon after, Walker's daughter-in-law, Harriet N. F. Walker, took over her position and led the order until 1957.

=== The St. Luke Herald ===
In a 1901 speech at the convention for the Independent Order of St. Luke, Walker proposed that the order should create a newspaper for publicizing its actions. In March 29, 1902, she published the first issue of The St. Luke Herald, a newspaper for the organization. She was motivated by the need to draw attention to black issues in the community and increase communication for the Order. The first issue decried Jim Crow laws, a discriminatory justice system, and the restriction of public school privileges. The paper included a section for children, letting them publish letters to "The St. Luke Grandmother" and publishing her advice. Walker was the journal's editor for over 30 years.

The newspaper began as a weekly publication, edited and printed from the order's office headquarters. By 1916, it had 4,000 subscribers, and by 1929 it became Richmond's most popular black weekly newspaper, surpassing the Richmond Planet with 30% of black families in Richmond subscribed to the Herald. The paper suffered due to the Great Depression, adapting to become the monthly St. Luke Fraternal Bulletin and decreasing its journalism. National black weekly newspapers like the Chicago Defender and the Norfolk Journal and Guide filled a similar role in journalism and activism for the ensuing decades.

== Establishment of the St. Luke Penny Savings Bank ==
In 1903, Walker chartered the St. Luke Penny Savings Bank. She wanted to help finance black home ownership and turn saved cents into dollars for black people. Walker served as the bank's first president, which earned her the recognition of being the first African-American woman to charter a bank in the United States. Charles Thaddeus Russell was Richmond's first black architect and he designed the building for Walker. The St. Luke Penny Savings Bank's leadership also included several female board members.

Walker provided children's savings initiatives through the bank, giving children in Richmond's Jackson Ward cardboard boxes for saving pennies. She let them open bank accounts when they had saved a dollar, and claimed that many had saved $100–400 during this time.

By 1920, Walker claimed that the bank had helped 645 black families completely pay off their homes. Walker was bank president through two mergers, retiring to chairman of the board of directors due to poor health in 1932. Eventually, the bank was renamed to The Consolidated Bank and Trust Company, which grew to serve generations of Richmonders as an African-American owned institution.

== Community involvement ==
Walker volunteered for a number of organizations related to education and racial equality. She established and maintained a Community House in Richmond, helped recruit and keep a visiting nurse, and advised the Piedmont Sanitorium for black people with tuberculosis in Burkeville, Virginia. She handled the funds for the National League of Republican Colored Women and participated in women's suffrage and voter registration campaigns, and helped form the Virginia Lily-Black Republican Party. She ran unsuccessfully for Virginia's superintendent of public instruction at one point.

Walker served in many other organizations:

- Council of Colored Women (founder, president)
- NAACP Richmond Branch (cofounder)
- Negro Organization Society of Virginia (vice-president)
- NAACP (board member)
- National Urban League (board member)
- Virginia Interracial Committee (board member)
- State Federation of Colored Women
- International Council of Women of the Darker Races
- National Association of Wage Earners
- National Association of Colored Women's Clubs (executive committee)

Walker was the fifth vice president of the Acme Literary Association, a group of Richmond community activists that came together to have public discussions of various race issues. One of the founders of Acme Literary Association was Jame H. Hayes who was the President of the Valley School while Walker was working there.

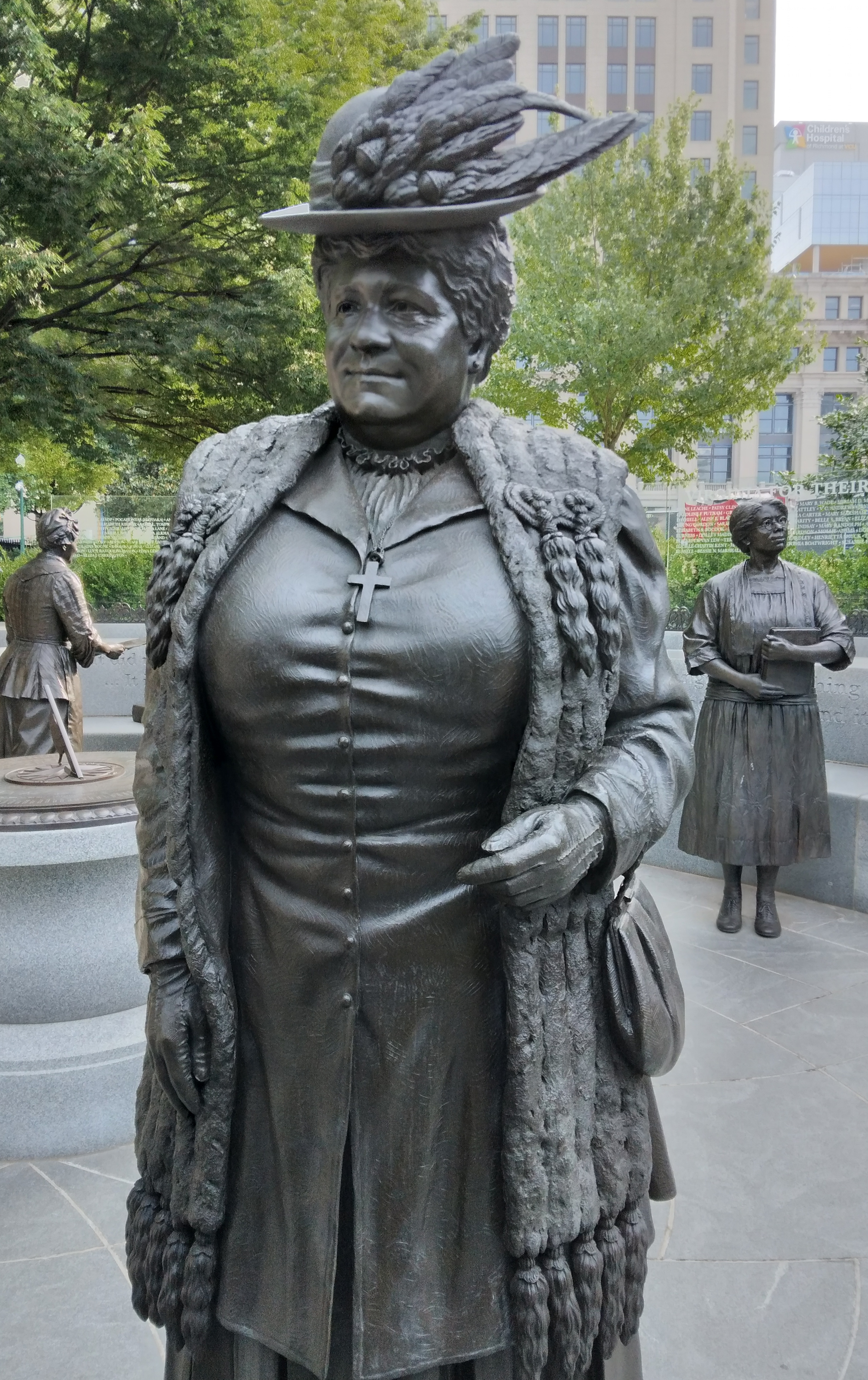
Maggie L. Walker statue at the Virginia Women's Monument

== Personal life ==
On September 14, 1886, in Richmond, she married Armstead Walker Jr. (1860–1914), a brick contractor. She spoke of her views on marriage:

"And since marriage is an equal partnership, I believe that the woman and the man are equal in power and should by consultation and agreement, mutually decide as to the conduct of the home and the government of the children"

They adopted a daughter, Polly Anderson, and had three sons: Russell Eccles Talmadge Walker born in 1890; Armstead Mitchell Walker born in 1893, but died seven months later; and Melvin DeWitt Walker who was born in 1897. The Walkers purchased a home in 1904 at 110 1/2 East Leigh Street, within the African-American Jackson Ward neighborhood of Richmond. It was enlarged over the years to accommodate their children's families.

In 1907 Walker fell on her front steps, damaging nerves and tendons in her knees. She suffered severe pain as a result and spent much of her last decade at home. In 1928 she used a caned wheelchair, adding a hand-operated elevator to her home, and modifying a 1929 eight-seat Packard to fit the chair.

On June 20, 1915, Walker's son, Russell Walker, at age 24–25, shot and killed his father, Armstead. Russell had mistaken Armstead for a burglar, for whom both he and his father had been searching. Russell was arrested and charged with murder and, after five months awaiting trial, was declared not guilty. The loss left Walker to manage a large household. Her work and investments kept the family comfortably situated.

Walker loved to entertain, and during this time, Walker still frequently invited black business, civic, and social leaders to dine at her house. Visitors included W.E.B. Du Bois, Langston Hughes, and Mary McLeod Bethune.

Russell never recovered from his father's death, and after eight years battling depression and alcoholism, died November 23, 1923. After Russell's death, his wife Harriet, or Hattie, and their daughter Maggie Laura Walker, moved in with Maggie Walker in Richmond. Hattie became a trusted advisor to Maggie within the Independent Order of St. Luke, quickly moving up the ranks.

Walker died December 15, 1934. The cause of death on her death certificate was diabetes gangrene.

Walker was inducted as an Honorary Member of the Nu Chapter of Zeta Phi Beta sorority at the chapter's first meeting in 1926.

== Legacy ==
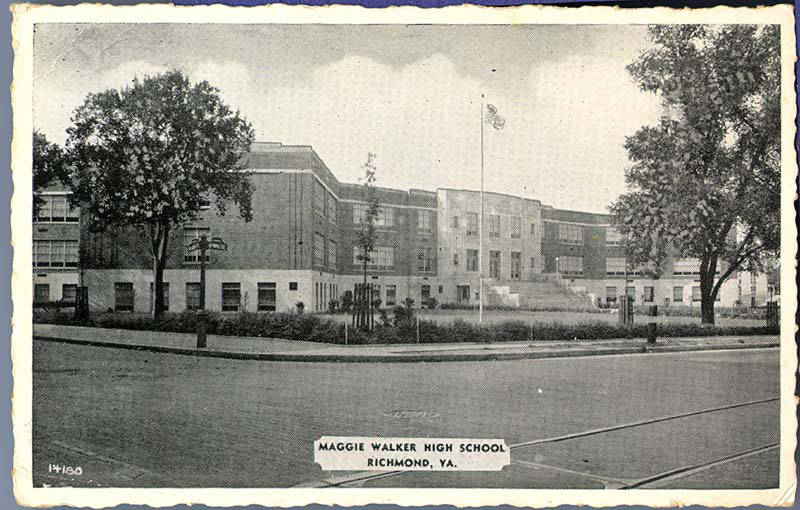
Maggie Walker High School, Richmond

In 1905, Walker was featured alongside other African-American leaders such as Mary Church Terrell, T. Thomas Fortune, and George Washington Carver, in a poster titled "101 Prominent Colored People".

Walker received an honorary master's degree from Virginia Union University in 1925, and became a trustee there in 1931. She also served as trustee to the National Training School in Washington D.C. She was inducted into the Junior Achievement U.S. Business Hall of Fame in 2001.

Walker's image was included in the 1945 painting Women Builders by William H. Johnson as part of his Fighters for Freedom series.

In Walker's honor, Richmond Public Schools built a large brick high school adjacent to Virginia Union University. Maggie L. Walker High School was one of two schools in the area for black students during the Jim Crow era; the other was Armstrong High School. Generations of students spent their high-school years at the school. It was totally refurbished to reopen in 2001 as the regional Maggie L. Walker Governor's School for Government and International Studies.

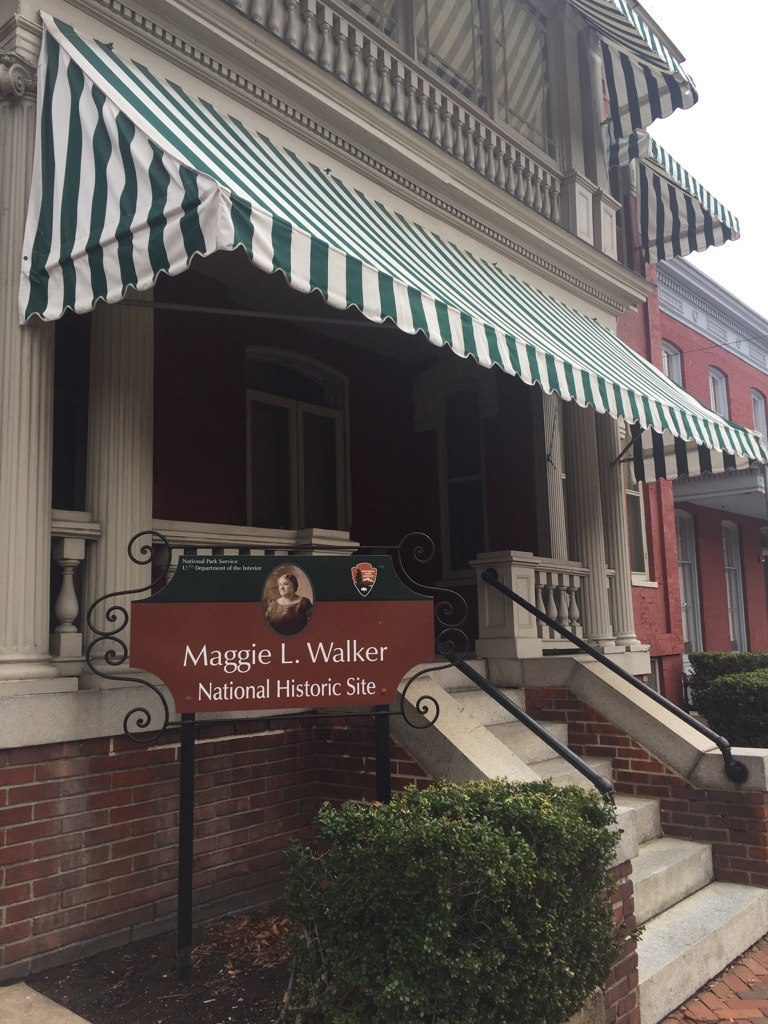
Maggie L Walker National Historic Site, Richmond

The St. Luke Building held the offices of the Independent Order of St. Luke, and the office of Maggie L. Walker. Walker's daughter-law, Harriet N. F. Walker, honored Maggie Walker's memory and worked to preserve her legacy. As late as 1981, Walker's office was preserved as it was at the time of her death in 1934. The building was listed on the National Register of Historic Places in 1982.

The National Park Service operates the Maggie L. Walker National Historic Site at her former Jackson Ward home. In 1978 the house was designated a National Historic Site and was opened as a museum in 1985. The site states that it "commemorates the life of a progressive and talented African-American woman. She achieved success in the world of business and finance as the first woman in the United States to charter and serve as president of a bank, despite the many adversities. The site includes a visitor center detailing her life and the Jackson Ward community in which she lived and worked and her residence of thirty years. The house is restored to its 1930s appearance with original Walker family pieces."

The National Park Service summarizes Walker's legacy with the statement: "Through her guidance of the Independent Order of St. Luke, Walker demonstrated that African American men and women could be leaders in business, politics, and education during a time when society insisted on the contrary."

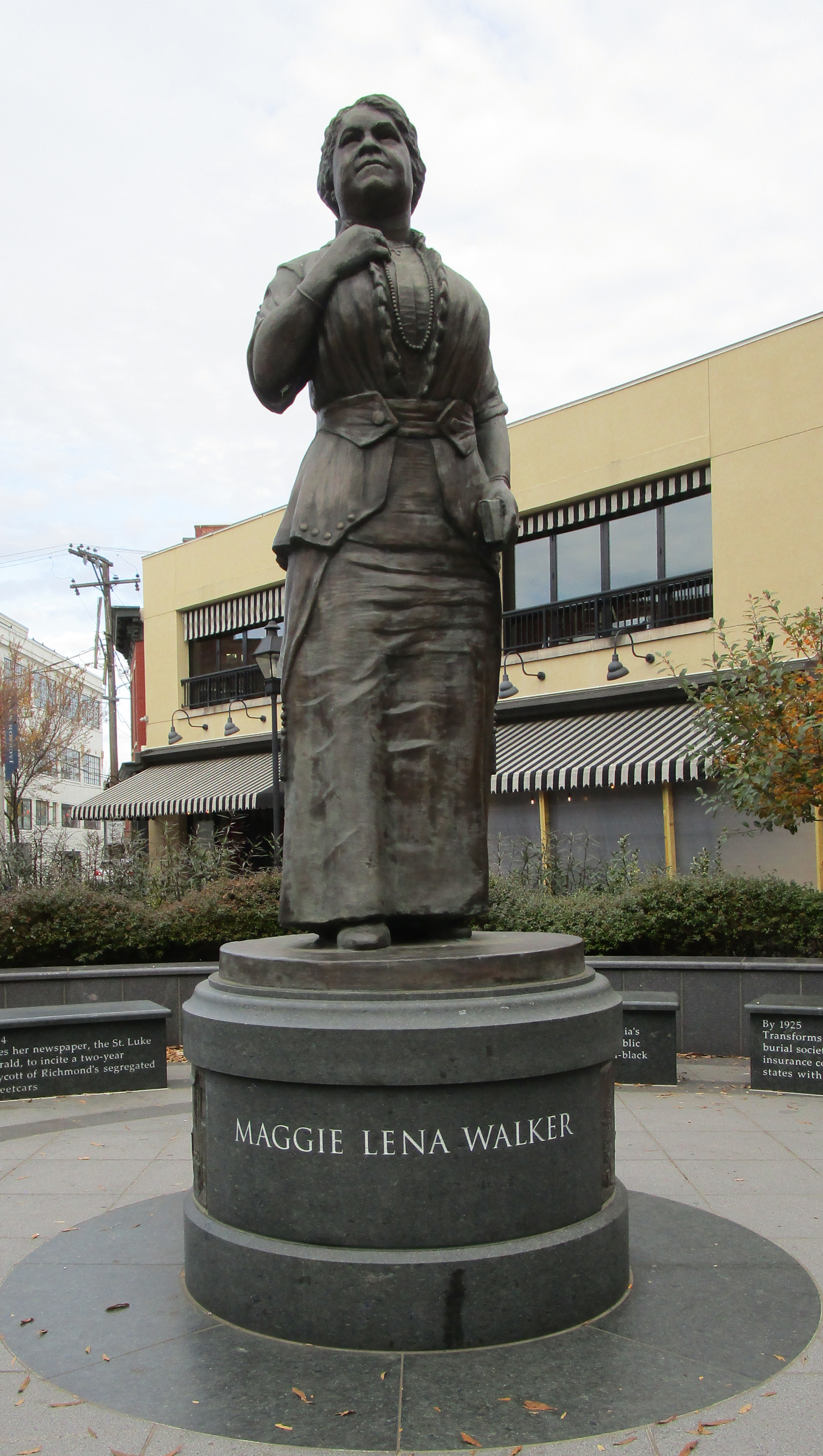
Statue of Walker

Walker was honored in 2000 as one of the first group of Virginia Women in History celebrated at the Library of Virginia.

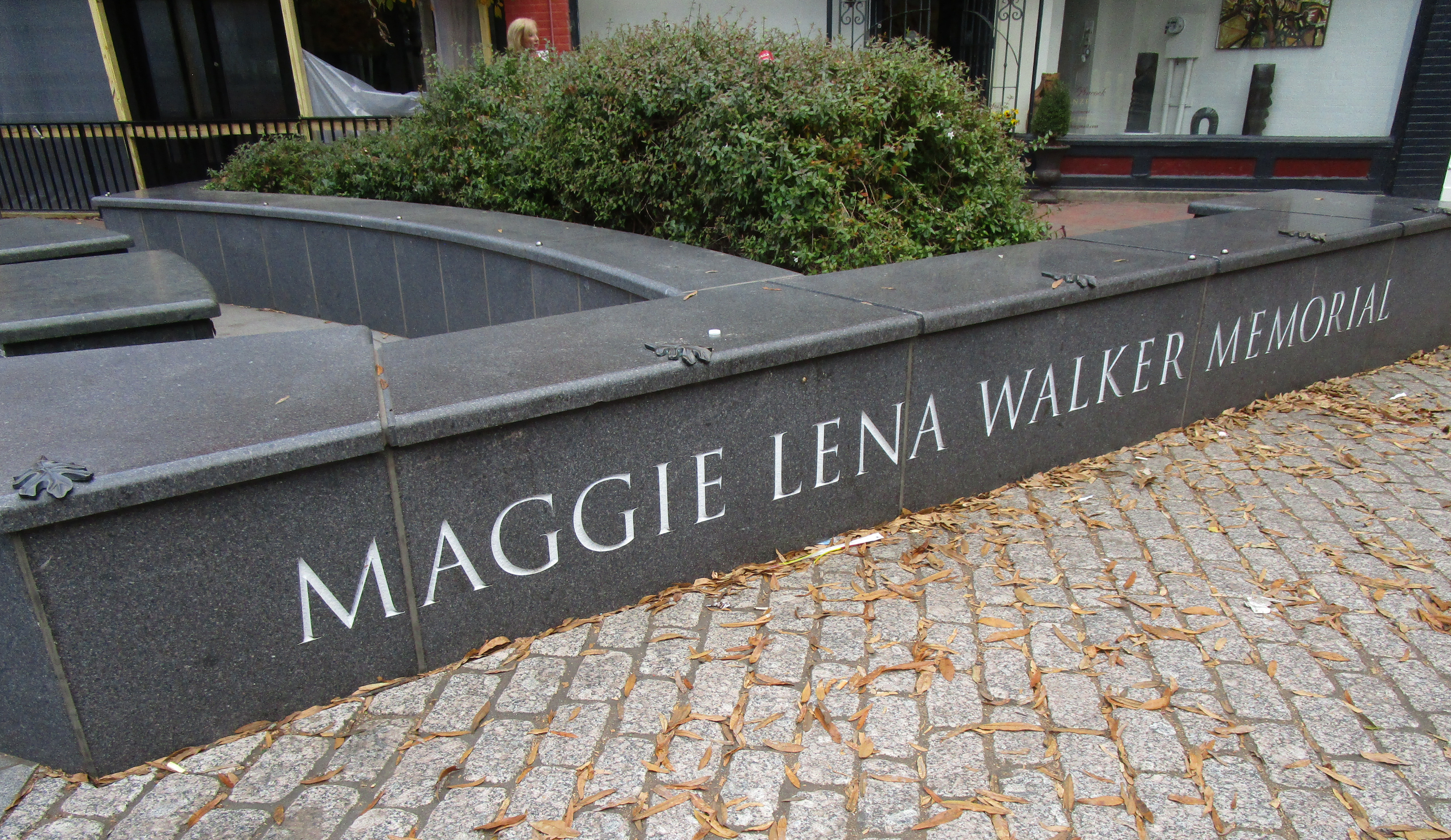
Maggie L. Walker Memorial Plaza

On July 15, 2017, a statue of Walker, designed by Antonio Tobias Mendez, was unveiled at the Maggie L. Walker Memorial Plaza on Broad Street in Richmond. The Washington Post noted that the bronze, 10-foot statue depicts Walker "as she lived—her glasses pinned to her lapel, a checkbook in hand."

In 2020, Walker was one of eight women achievers featured in "The Only One in the Room" display at the Smithsonian National Museum of American History.
