= Navy Hill School =

School in Richmond, Virginia

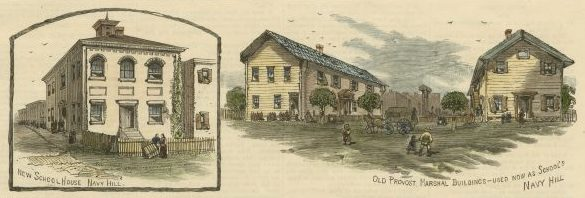
A drawing of the Navy Hill School published in Frank Leslie's Illustrated Newspaper in 1883

Navy Hill School was a school serving African American students in Richmond, Virginia. The school was in Richmond's Navy Hill neighborhood and opened in 1871. It was at Sixth Street and Duval Street. It was the first public school in Richmond to employ African American teachers. Peter Woolfolk, the first black teacher in Richmond, was part of the staff at the school.

Lizzie Knowles, the northern missionary teacher, served as principal of the school from 1873 to 1878 after which she was moved to the Richmond Colored Normal School.

Maggie Walker attended the school for two years around 1880. O.M. Stewart was her teacher at the school. He later wrote to Walker in a card: "If we are to judge the tree by its fruit, I conclude that in your case, the impressions must have been good and I therefore take some credit to myself. I consider that you, as well as many other of my old pupils have reflected great honor upon me as one of your old teachers."

In 1876 the school was recommended for closure due to poor conditions but was still operating in 1891. City documents in 1890 described the school's building as in poor condition and having been poorly built. A 1904 city directory includes teachers at the school and list Stephen T. Pendelton as its principal.

Daniel Webster Davis began teaching at the school in 1879. Daniel Barclay Williams taught at the school during the 1880s.

From 1977 to 2000 the Children's Museum of Richmond was housed in what was once the school's gymnasium.
