= Charles Thaddeus Russell =

Virginia's first black architect

- Charles Thaddeus Russell (Photo courtesy Sixth Mount Zion Baptist Church)
- Born: June 19, 1875; Richmond, Virginia, United States
- Died: August 24, 1952 (aged 77)
- Occupation: Architect
- Spouse: Ellen V. (née Trent) Russell
- Children: 2

Charles Thaddeus Russell (June 19, 1875 – August 24, 1952) was an American architect who was one of the first two licensed African American architects in Virginia. He was the first to be licensed in Richmond, Virginia and he designed buildings on what became known as the "Black Wall Street of America".

== Early life and education ==
Charles Thaddeus Russell was born in Richmond, Virginia in 1875. He grew up in a black section of Richmond called Jackson Ward. He began his studies at the Hampton Institute in 1893. He graduated from the Institute in 1899 and also received a certificate in carpentry. In 1901, he became a carpentry instructor at the Tuskegee Institute in Alabama. Russell worked on the campus buildings and supervised all of the carpentry. He also collaborated and worked closely with the architects on the project. It was at the Institute that he studied drafting and architecture and served a de facto apprenticeship. In 1907 he moved back to Virginia and became the superintendent of the grounds at Virginia Union University. In 1909 the Virginia Union President gave Russell permission to begin his career as an architect.

== Career ==
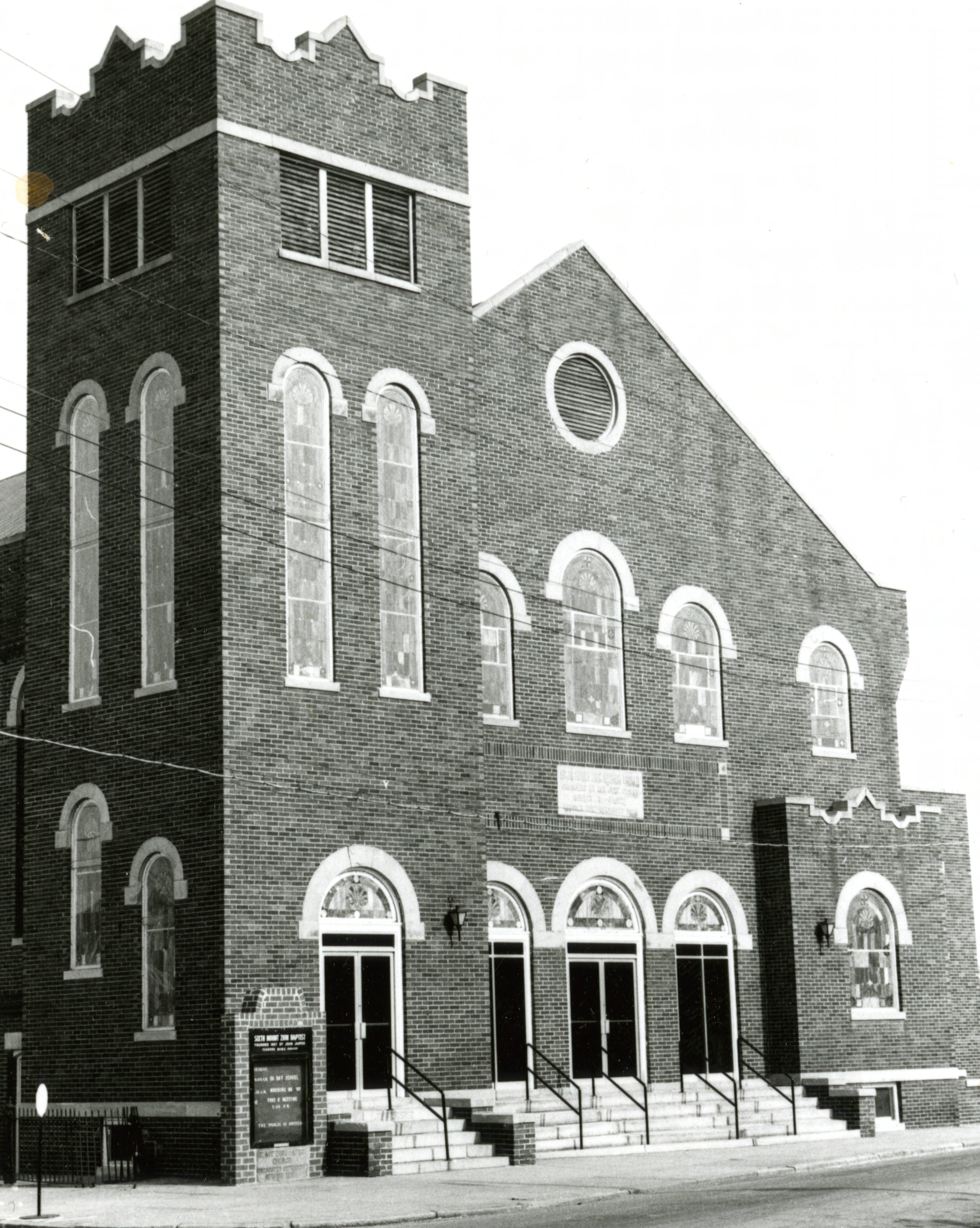
The Sixth Mount Zion Baptist Church was remodeled and extended by Russell in 1925.

Russell was one of Virginia's first two licensed black architects. Russell was issued his architect license October 2, 1922. The licenses were given in alphabetical order so another African American architect John A. Lankford was issued his license before Russell.

A majority of the workers and contractors hired by Russell were black. He designed homes and commercial buildings in what was called Postletown or "Apostle Town" (now known as Jackson Ward). The area was called "Posteltown" because the street names included the names of the Apostles in the New Testament. Russel's designs helped to transform the Jackson Ward area into a thriving area for commerce. His designs helped to transform the area into what was called the "Black Wall Street of America."

In 1910, he designed his first building for Virginia businesswoman Maggie Walker. The building was constructed as a bank but is now known as the St. Luke Building with 12 apartments on the upper levels. It is now being renovated to create loft apartments. The building was listed on the National Register of Historic Places in 1982. In 1915 he designed a home for a doctor named William Henry Hughes. He was also hired to remodel the 1873 Ebenezer Baptist Church in Jackson Ward. He altered the design of the church from Victorian Gothic to Neoclassical and added four unique spires to the top of the church in place of a steeple. He designed the Rialto Theatre in Petersburg, Virginia which was completed in 1923. In 1925, the historic Sixth Mount Zion Baptist Church was remodeled and extended by Russell.

In 1942, in one of Russell's last jobs as an architect, he was tasked with supervising the move and reconstruction of the Belgian Building on the Virginia Union University grounds. The building was constructed by Belgium for the 1939 New York World's Fair. The structure was supposed to be disassembled and returned to Belgium after the fair, but the German invasion of Belgium (1940) resulted in the building remaining in the United States. Twenty-seven different institutions wanted the building but it was granted to Virginia Union University.

== Death ==
Russell died on August 24, 1952 and was interred at Woodland Cemetery in Richmond.

== Gallery ==
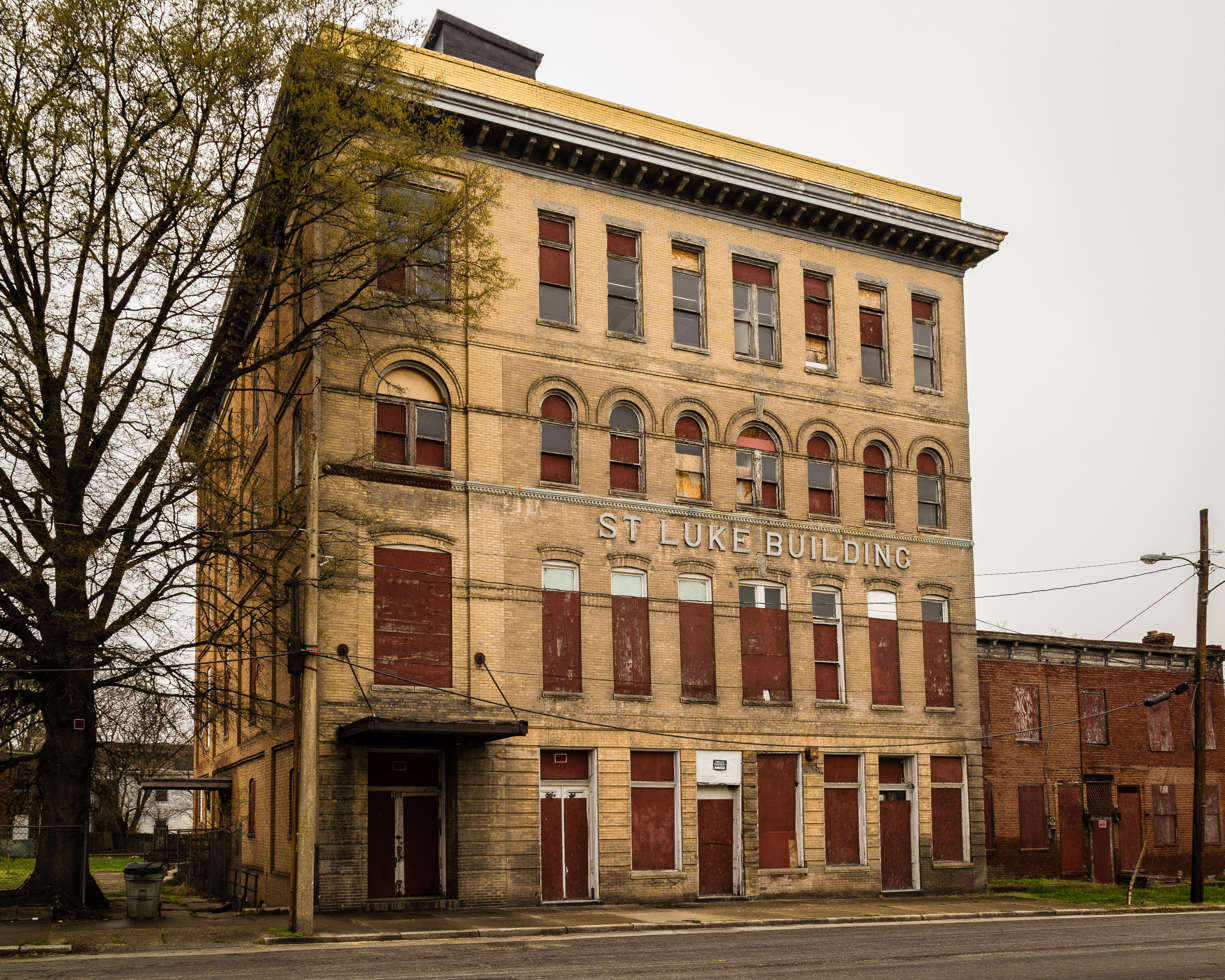
St. Luke Penny Savings Bank

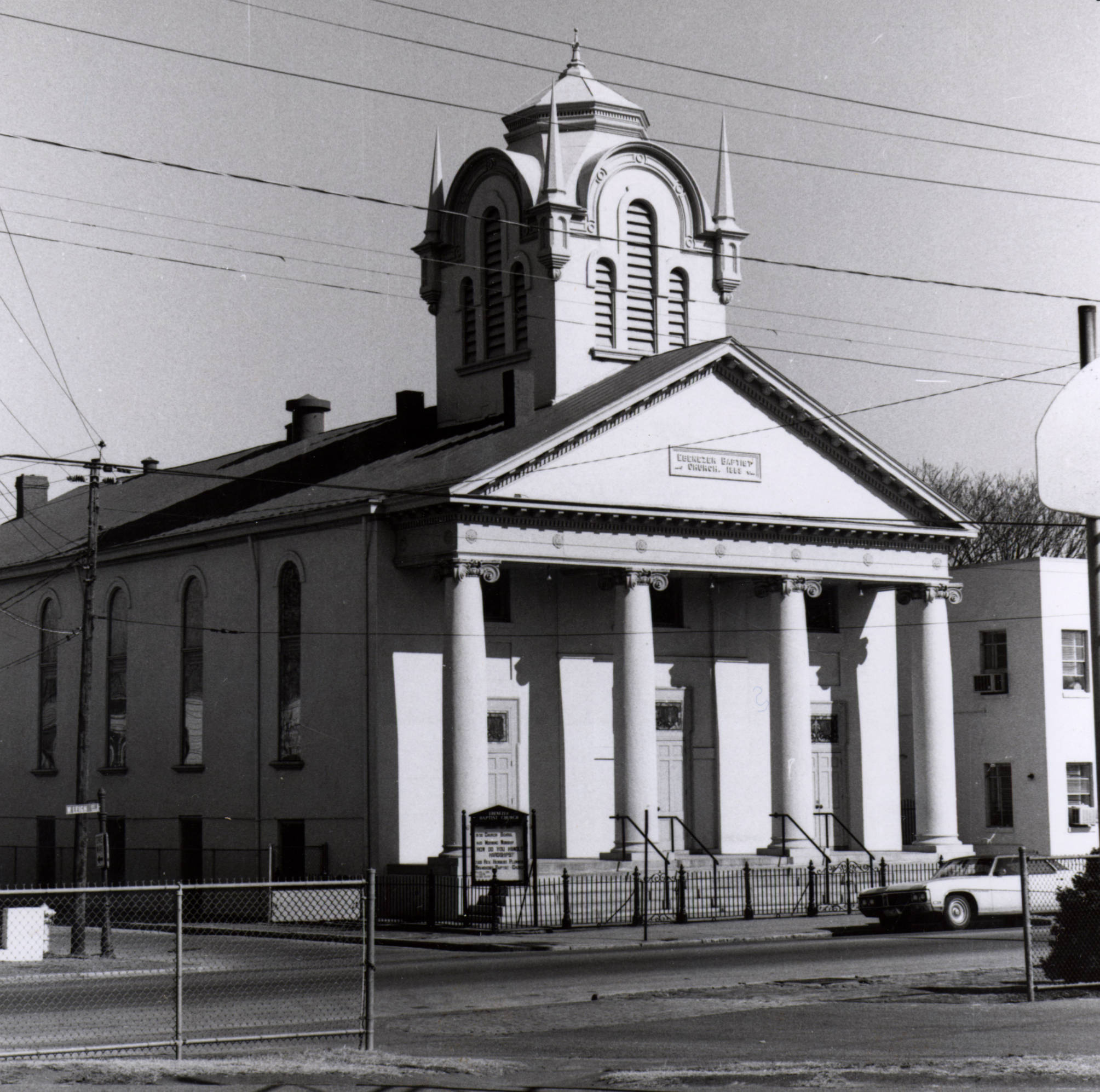
Ebenezer Baptist Church

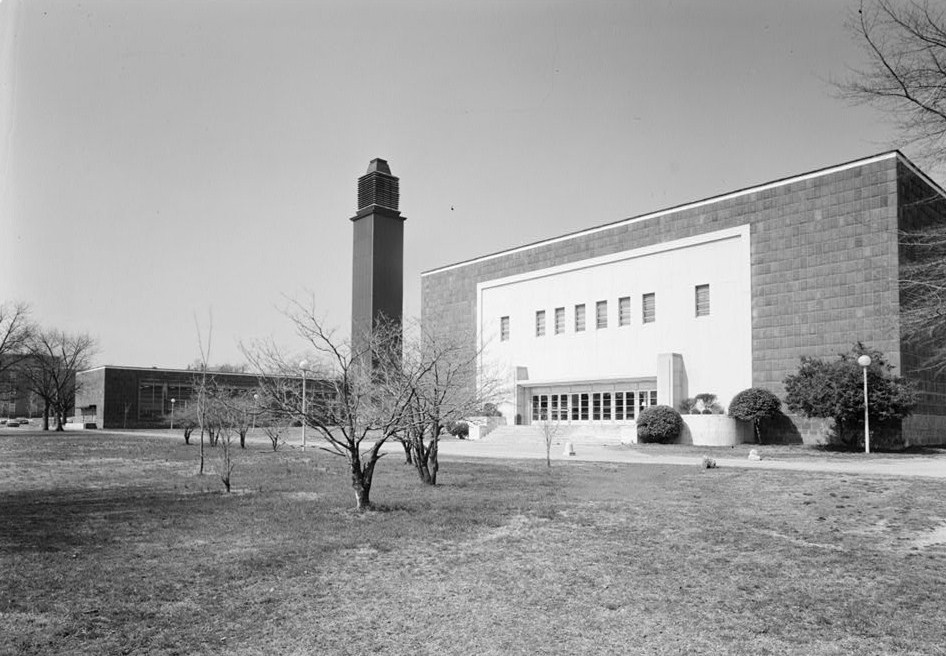
Belgian building
