= Mary Ann Prout =

African-American educator

- Born: Mary Ann Prout; February 14, 1800 or 1801; Maryland
- Died: 1884; Baltimore, Maryland
- Occupations: founder, businesswoman, teacher.
- Known for: Founder of the Black fraternal society, Independent Order of St. Luke

Mary Ann Prout (February 14, 1800 or 1801 – 1884) was an African-American educator and founder of the Black fraternal society, Independent Order of St. Luke. Prout died in Baltimore around 1884.

== Early life ==
Prout was thought to be born in either South River or Baltimore, Maryland in 1800 or 1801. Prout was enslaved at birth and was later freed before the American Civil War.

== Career ==
Prout founded a day school in Baltimore in 1830, and taught there until its closure in 1867. Prout was a member of the Bethel African Methodist Episcopal Church. She was involved in other humanitarian ventures; a trusteeship of the Gregory Aged Women's Home, president of the local chapter of the National Reform Educational Association, and founded a secret order in 1867 that became the Independent Order of St. Luke, a Black aid organization.

== The Independent Order of St. Luke ==
The Independent Order of St. Luke was founded in Baltimore, Maryland, in 1867 by Mary Ann Prout. Originally a women's only aid society, it allowed men to join in the 1880s.
