= Richmond, Virginia, in the American Civil War =

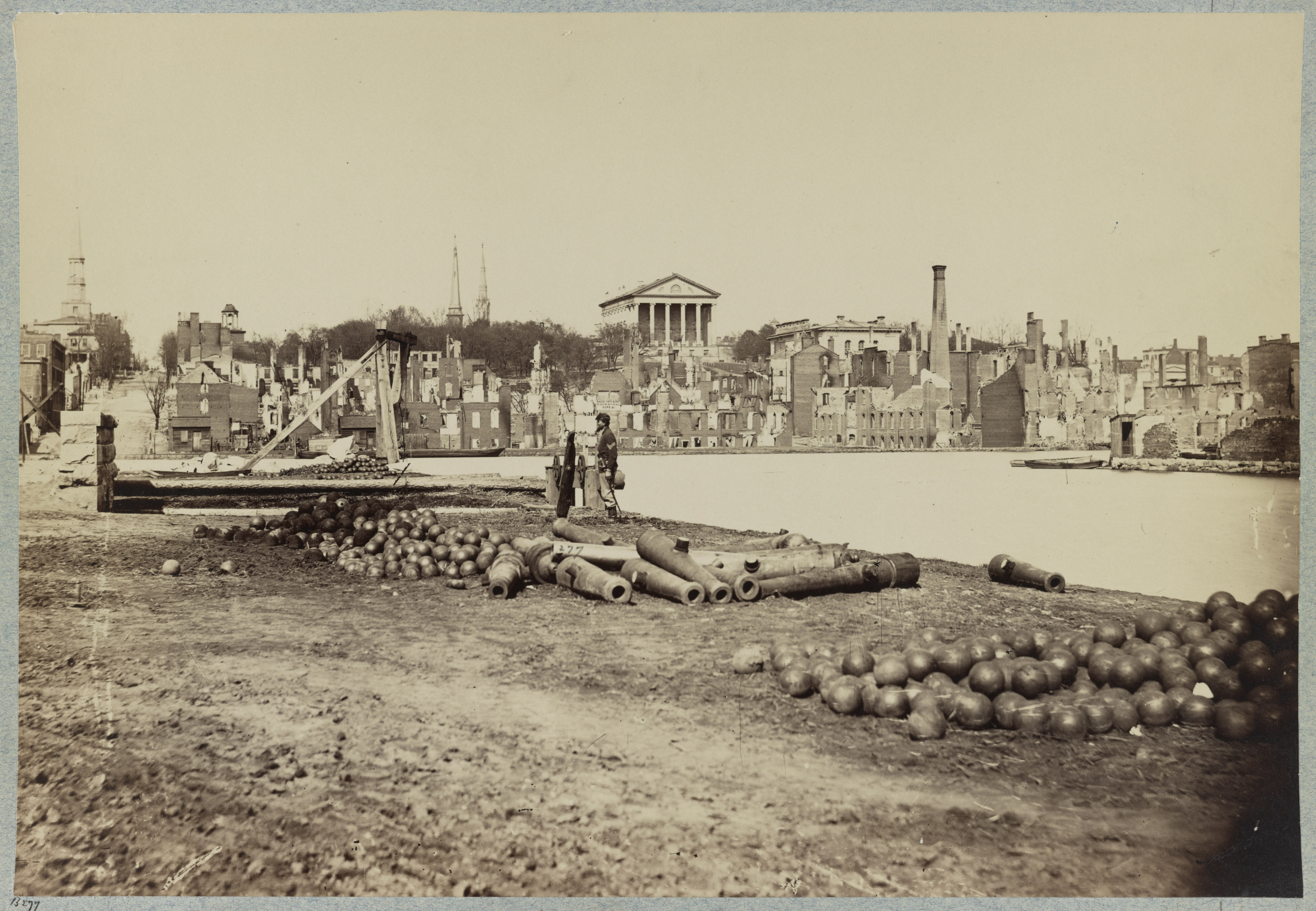
View of Richmond above the Canal Basin, after the Evacuation Fire of 1865

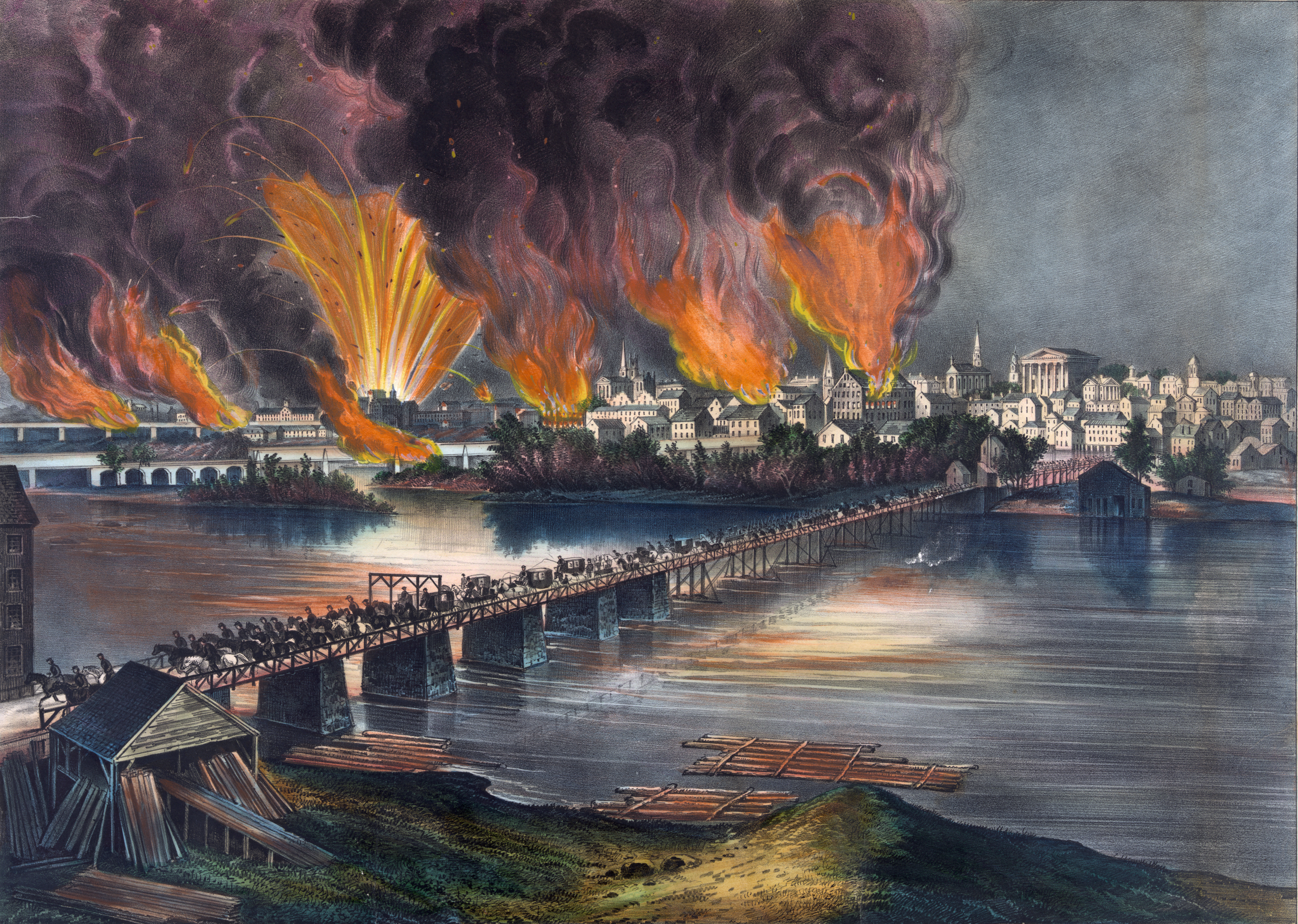
Lithograph depicting the Evacuation Fire (Currier & Ives, 1865)

Richmond, Virginia, served as the capital of the Confederate States of America during the American Civil War from May 1861 to April 1865. Besides its political status, it was a vital source of weapons and supplies for the war effort, as well as the terminus of five railroads; as such, it was defended by the Confederate States Army at all costs.

The Union made many attempts to invade Richmond. In the Peninsula Campaign of 1862, General George McClellan moved up the James River, almost to the suburbs of the city, but was beaten back by Robert E. Lee in the Seven Days Battles. In 1864–65, General Ulysses S. Grant laid siege to nearby Petersburg. By April 1865, the Confederate government realized the siege was almost over and abandoned the city lest they be captured. The retreating Confederates chose to burn military supplies rather than let them fall into Union hands; the resulting fire destroyed much of central Richmond.

== Strategic and symbolic significance ==
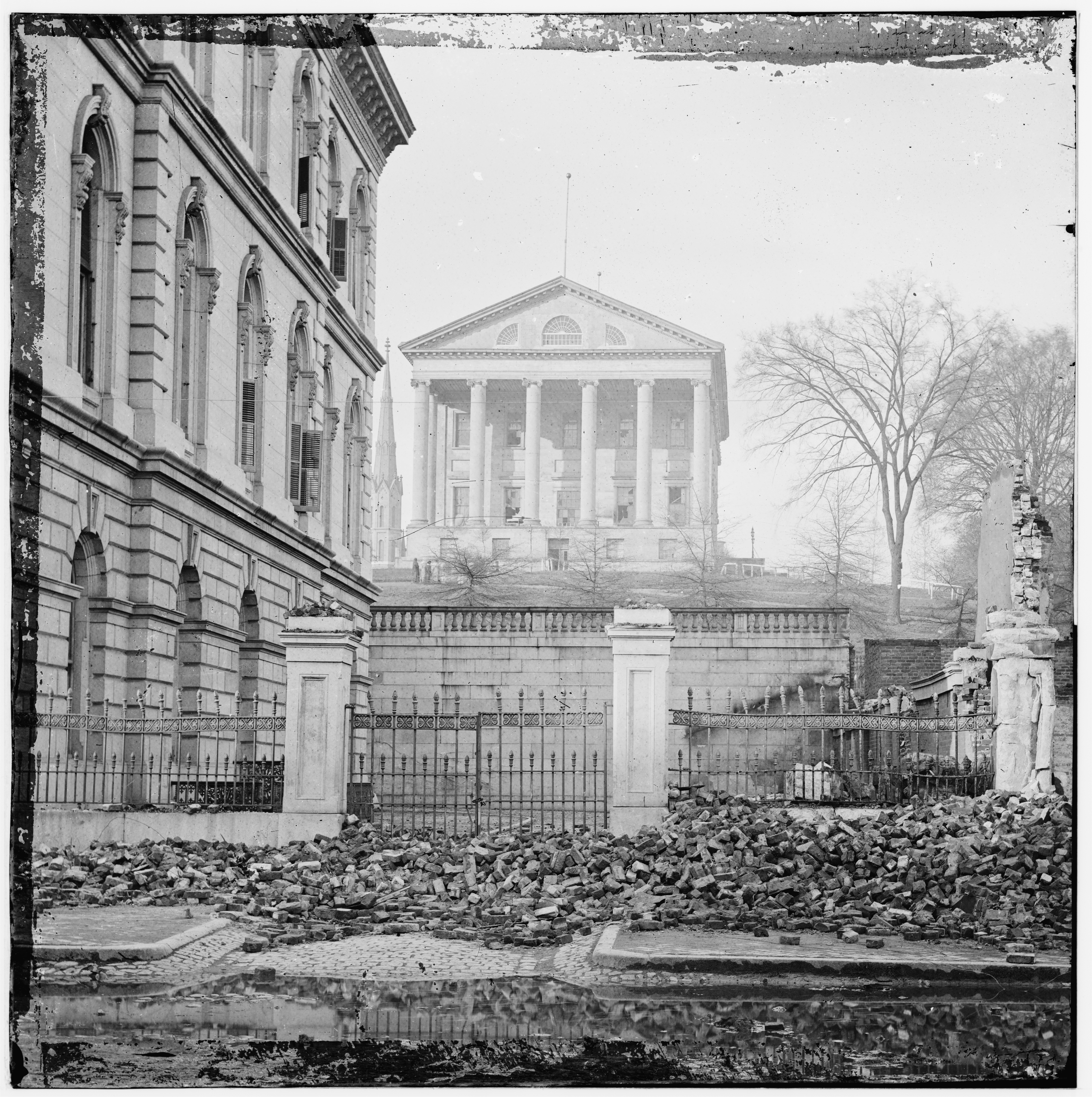
Virginia State Capitol, used as the Confederate Capitol. To the left is the Customs House, used by the Confederate Department of the Treasury and the offices of the President and Vice President.

In the 1860 United States census, Richmond was the 25th largest urban area in the United States, with a population of 37,910. The city had been the capital of Virginia since 1780, and became the third largest city in the Confederacy behind New Orleans and Charleston.

=== Capital of the Confederacy ===
The Confederate States of America was formed in early 1861 from the first states to secede from the Union. Montgomery, Alabama, was selected as the Confederate capital.

After the Confederate Army fired on Fort Sumter in Charleston, South Carolina, on April 12, 1861, beginning the Civil War, additional states seceded. Virginia voted to secede from the Union on April 17, 1861, ratified its secession by popular vote on May 23, and existed briefly thereafter as a republic before joining the Confederacy on June 19, 1861. However, on May 8, 1861, in the Confederate Capital City of Montgomery, Alabama, the decision was made to name the City of Richmond, Virginia as the new Capital of the Confederacy. The Confederate capital was moved to Richmond in recognition of Virginia's strategic importance. Virginia was the South's industrial center, with an industrial output nearly equal to that of all other Confederate states combined. The Confederacy also hoped the move would consolidate its hold on the state since it had difficulty securing other states bordering the Union.

The Seal of the Confederate States, adopted April 30, 1863, features a depiction of George Washington based on the Washington Monument adjacent to the Confederate Capitol building.

Richmond remained the capital of the Confederacy until April 2, 1865, at which point the government evacuated and was re-established, albeit briefly, in Danville, Virginia.

=== Industrial center ===
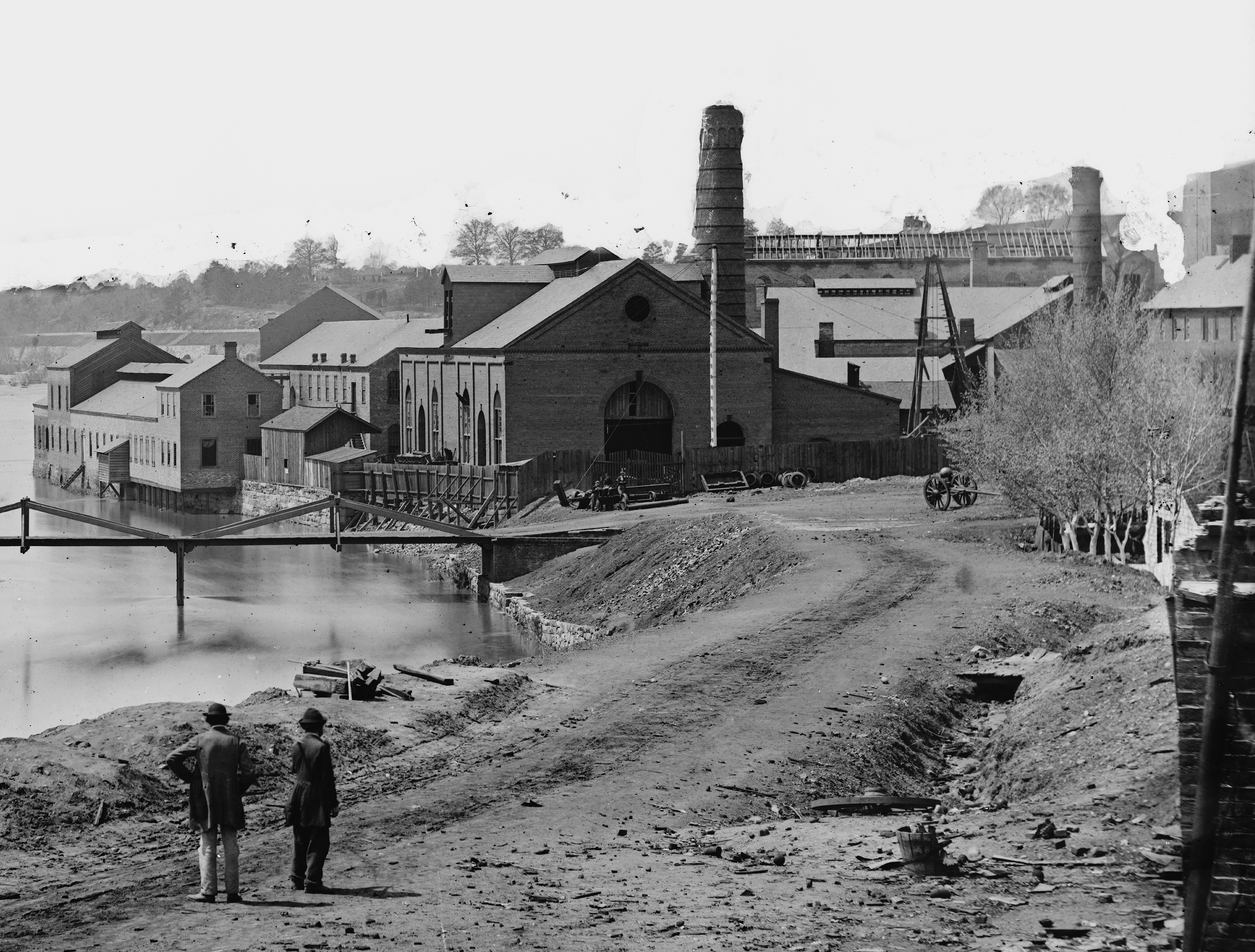
The Tredegar Iron Works (1865)

Positioned on the Fall Line along the James River, the city had ready access to an ample supply of hydropower to run mills and factories.

The Tredegar Iron Works, sprawling along the James River, supplied high-quality munitions to the Confederacy during the war. The company also manufactured railroad steam locomotives in the same period. Tredegar is also credited with the production of approximately 10,000 artillery pieces during the war which was about half of the South's total domestic production of artillery between the war years of 1861–1865. The foundry made the 723 tons of armor plating that covered the CSS Virginia (the former USS Merrimack), which fought the first battle between ironclad warships in March 1862. The Tredegar works were adjacent to the Richmond Arsenal, which was recommissioned in the lead-up to the war. On Brown's Island, the Confederate States Laboratory was established to consolidate explosives production to an isolated setting in the eventuality of an accidental explosion.

Tredegar-made 18-pounder artillery supply in the city defensive of Vicksburg.

Numerous smaller factories in Richmond produced tents, uniforms, harnesses and leather goods, swords and bayonets, and other war materials. As the war progressed, the city's warehouses became the supply and logistical center for much of the Confederate forces within the Eastern Theater.

Richmond was also a transportation hub. It was the terminus of five railroads: the Richmond, Fredericksburg, and Potomac Railroad; the Virginia Central Railroad; the Richmond and York River Railroad; the Richmond and Petersburg Railroad; and the Richmond and Danville Railroad. In addition, the James River and Kanawha Canal ran through it with access to the Chesapeake Bay and the Atlantic Ocean. At the fall of Richmond in April 1865, all but the Richmond and Danville Railroad and the canal had effectively been cut off by Union forces.

== Peninsula Campaign ==
In the late spring of 1862, a large Federal army under Major General George B. McClellan landed on the Virginia Peninsula. McClellan, who had enjoyed early publicity from a series of successes in western Virginia, was assigned the task of seizing and occupying Richmond. His military maneuvers and the resulting battles and engagements became collectively known as the Peninsula Campaign, culminating in the Seven Days Battles.

McClellan's starting base was the Union-held Fort Monroe at the eastern tip of the Peninsula. Efforts to take Richmond by the James River were successfully blocked by Confederate defenses at the Battle of Drewry's Bluff on May 15, about eight miles downstream from Richmond. The Union Army advance was halted shortly outside of the city at the Battle of Seven Pines on May 31 and June 1, 1862 (near the site of what is now Richmond International Airport).

=== Seven Days Battles ===
Over a period of seven days from June 25 to July 1, 1862, Richmond's defensive line of batteries and fortifications set up under Robert E. Lee, Confederate cavalry under J.E.B. Stuart, and Stonewall Jackson's "foot cavalry" combined to unnerve McClellan, and he initiated a Union retreat before Richmond.

Even as other portions of the South were already falling, the failure of the Peninsula Campaign to take Richmond led to almost three more years of warfare between the states.

== Mid-war years ==
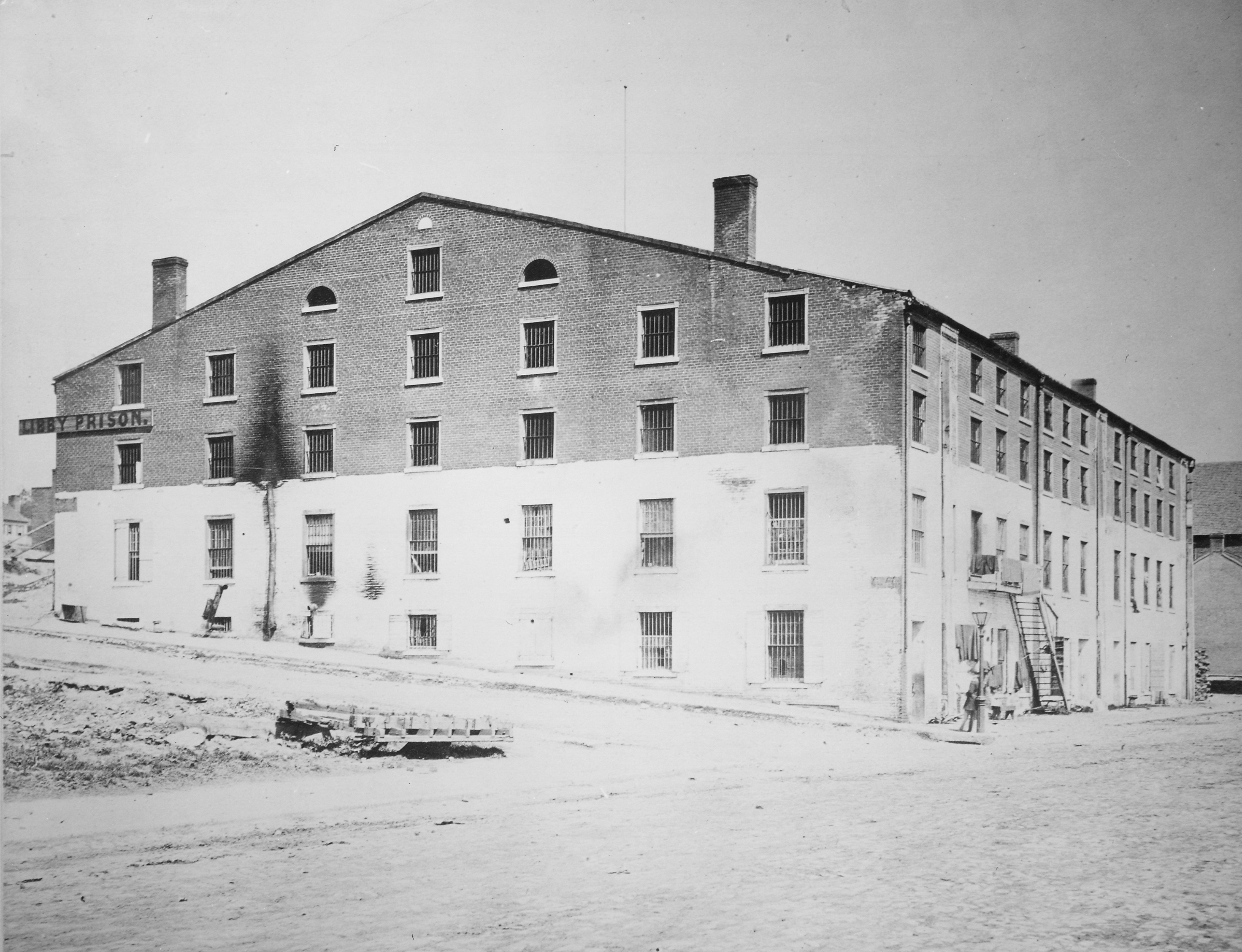
Libby Prison in 1865, viewed from Dock Street

As a result of its proximity to the battlefields of the Eastern Theater and its high level of defense, the city processed many casualties of both sides: as home to numerous hospitals (the largest such being Chimborazo Hospital), prisons (notably Libby Prison, Castle Thunder, and Belle Isle), and various cemeteries.

On March 13, 1863, the Confederate Laboratory on Brown's Island was rocked by an explosion that killed dozens of workers.

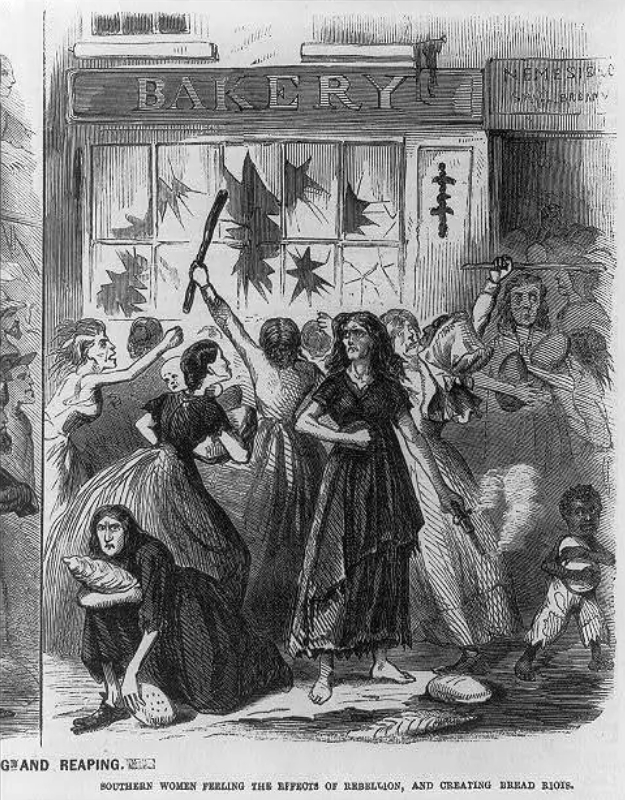
Bread riots in Richmond

On April 2, 1863, the city was beset by a large bread riot as housewives could no longer afford very high food prices and broke into stores. The riot was organized by Mary Jackson, a huckster and the mother of a soldier. The militia was called out to end the riot.

The Confederacy hit its high-water mark at the Battle of Gettysburg in July 1863. Subsequent campaigning in the balance of the year failed to bring about a decisive battle, and Richmond residents settled down to the winter of 1863–64 mostly still optimistic about the Confederacy's fortunes.

One of the Civil War's most daring prison breaks, the Libby Prison escape, took place in February 1864 when more than 100 Federal captives escaped and fled into the night. Fewer than half were recaptured, with the majority reaching Union lines and safety. The city was shaken shortly thereafter by the March 2, 1864 Dahlgren Affair, a failed Union raid on the city.

Ulysses S. Grant's 1864 Overland Campaign resulted in Robert E. Lee's Confederate army retiring to the vicinity of Richmond and Petersburg, where they checked Grant's progress.

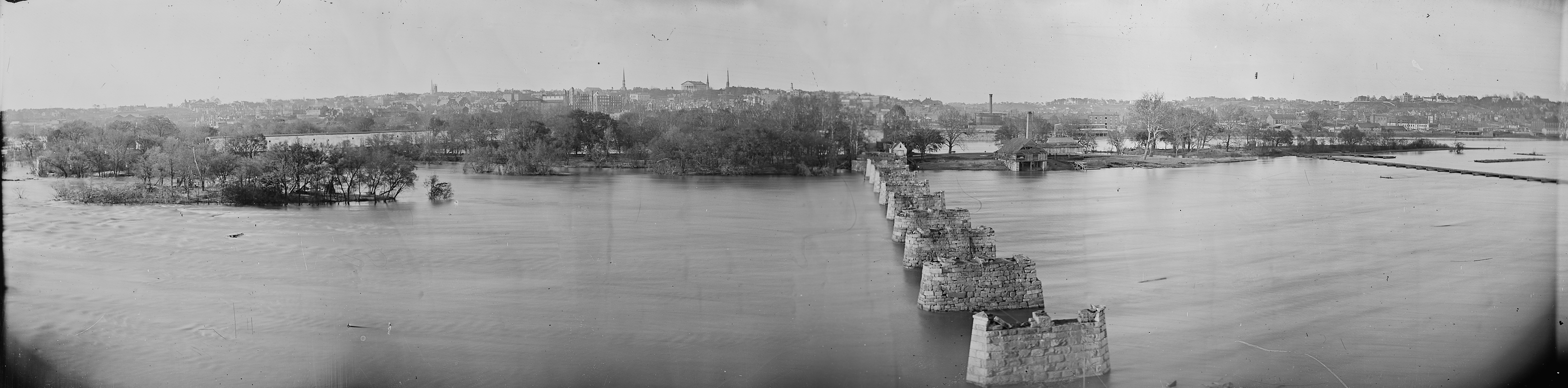
Richmond skyline after the Evacuation Fire, viewed from across the James. The burnt-out Mayo Bridge is in the foreground.

== Fall of Richmond ==
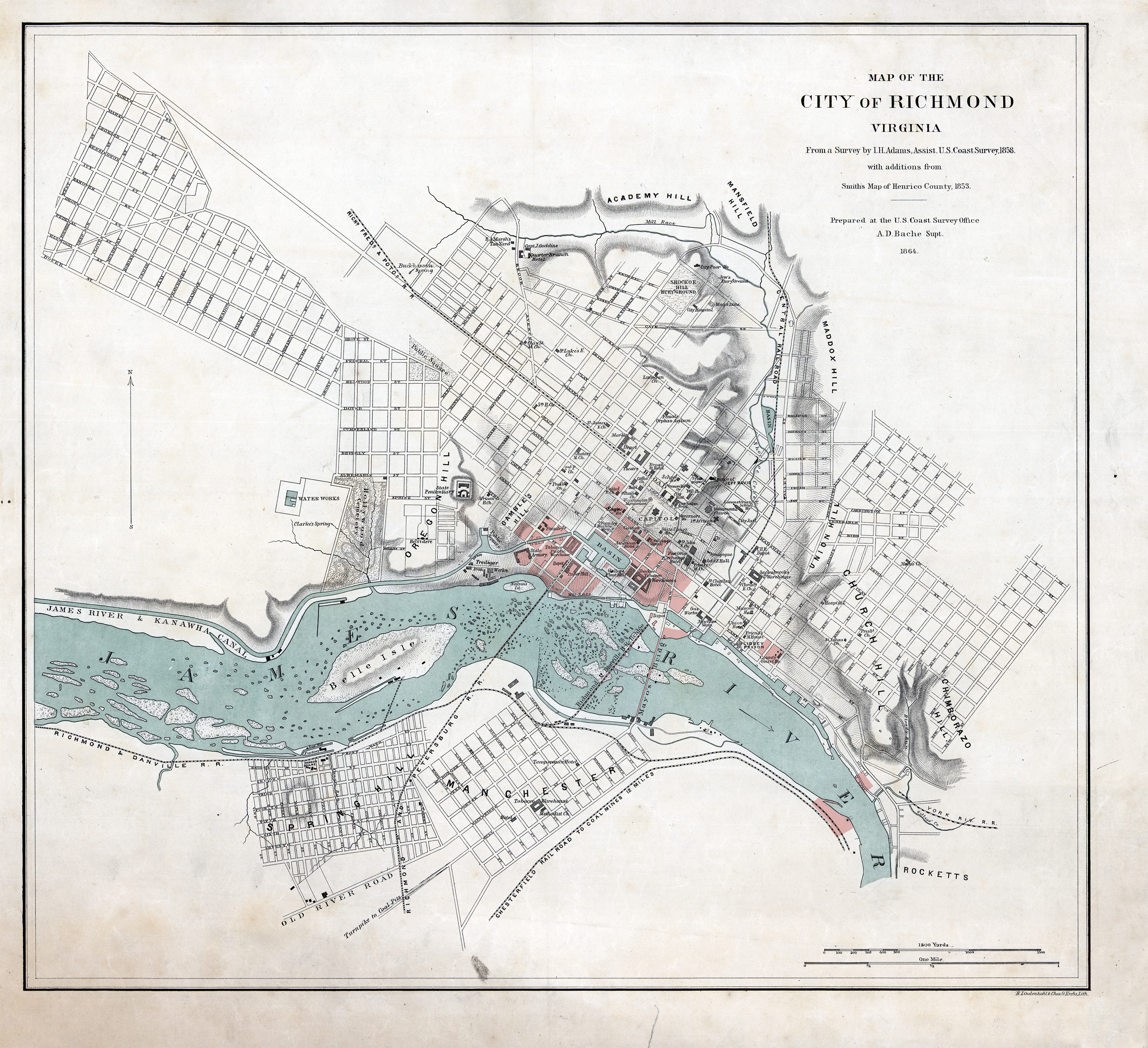
Map of Richmond during the war; areas burnt during the evacuation in red

After a long siege, Grant captured Petersburg and Richmond in early April 1865. As the fall of Petersburg became imminent, on Evacuation Sunday (April 2), President Davis, his Cabinet, and the Confederate defenders abandoned Richmond and fled south on the last open railroad line, the Richmond and Danville.

The retreating soldiers were under orders to set fire to bridges, and supply warehouses as they left. This included exploding the Powder Magazine in the early morning of April 3, at the Shockoe Hill Burying Ground, where the Alms-house was also located. The explosion killed several of the paupers who were being housed in a temporary Alms-house, and a sleeping person on 2nd St. The concussion shattered windows all over the city. The fire in the largely abandoned city spread out of control, and large parts of Richmond were destroyed, reaching to the very edge of Capitol Square mostly unchecked. The conflagration was not completely extinguished until the mayor and other civilians went to the Union lines east of Richmond on New Market Road (now State Route 5) and surrendered the city the next day. Union troops put out the raging fires in the city. The event became known as the Evacuation Fire. The occupation was overseen by General Godfrey Weitzel and later General Edward Ord.

President Lincoln, who had been visiting General Grant and staying nearby at City Point, toured the fallen city (April 4–7) by foot and carriage with his young son Tad, and visited the former White House of the Confederacy and the Virginia State Capitol.

About one week after the evacuation of Richmond, General Robert E. Lee surrendered to Grant on April 9 ending the Battle of Appomattox Courthouse. Within the same week, on the evening of April 14, President Lincoln was assassinated in Washington D.C. by the Confederate sympathizer John Wilkes Booth.

Damage from the Evacuation Fire
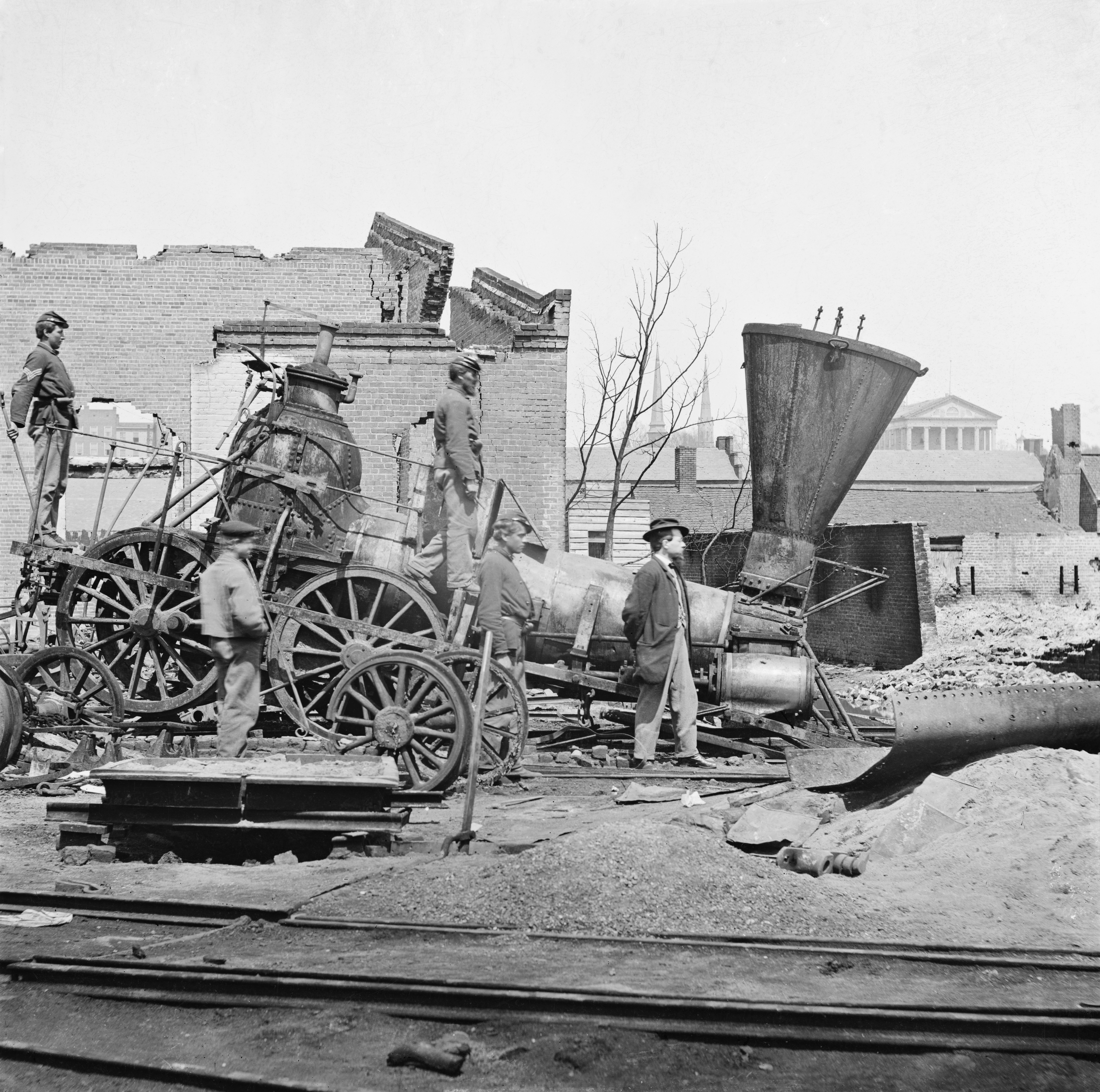
Remains of a locomotive of the Richmond and Petersburg Railroad

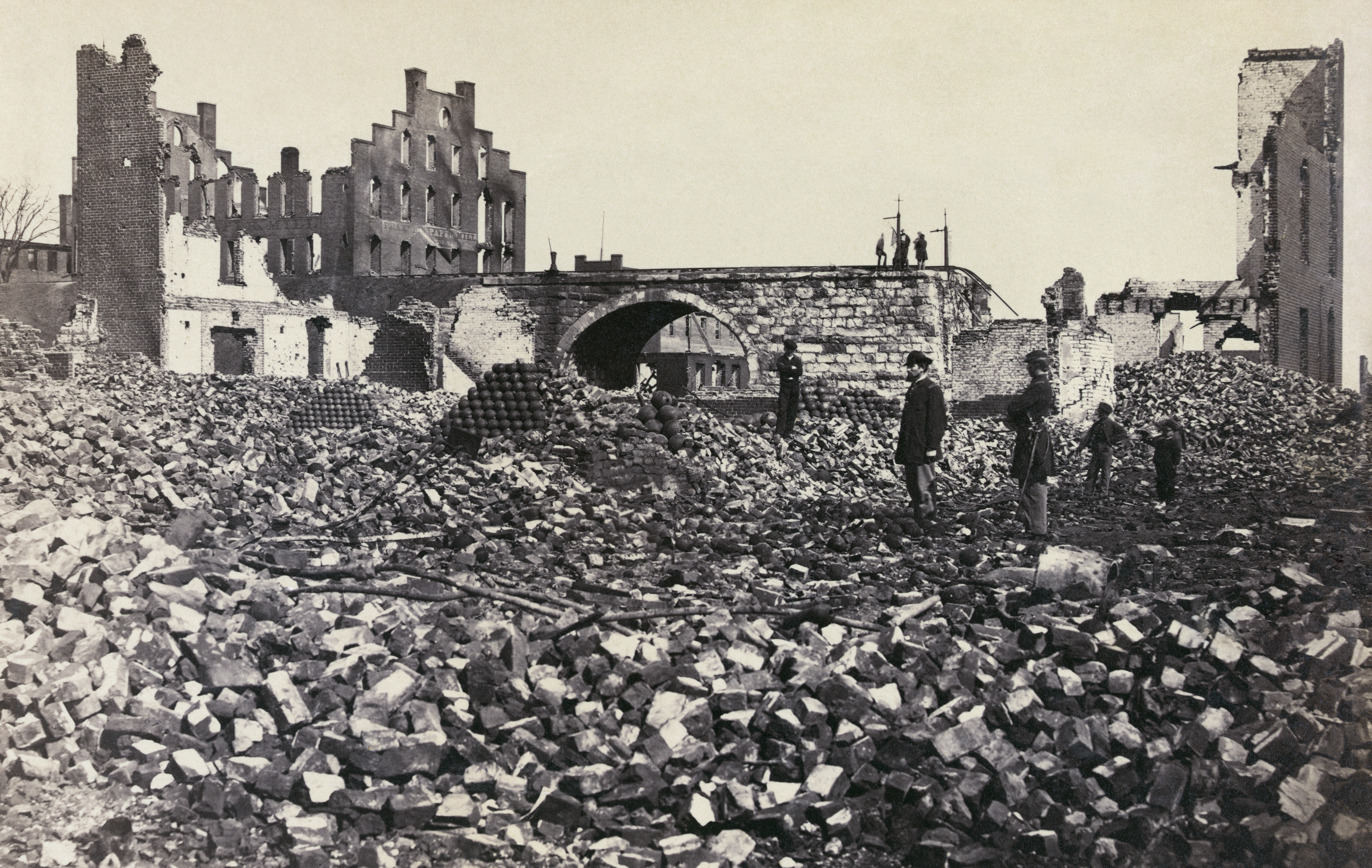
Damage near the Armory. Albumen print, 1865

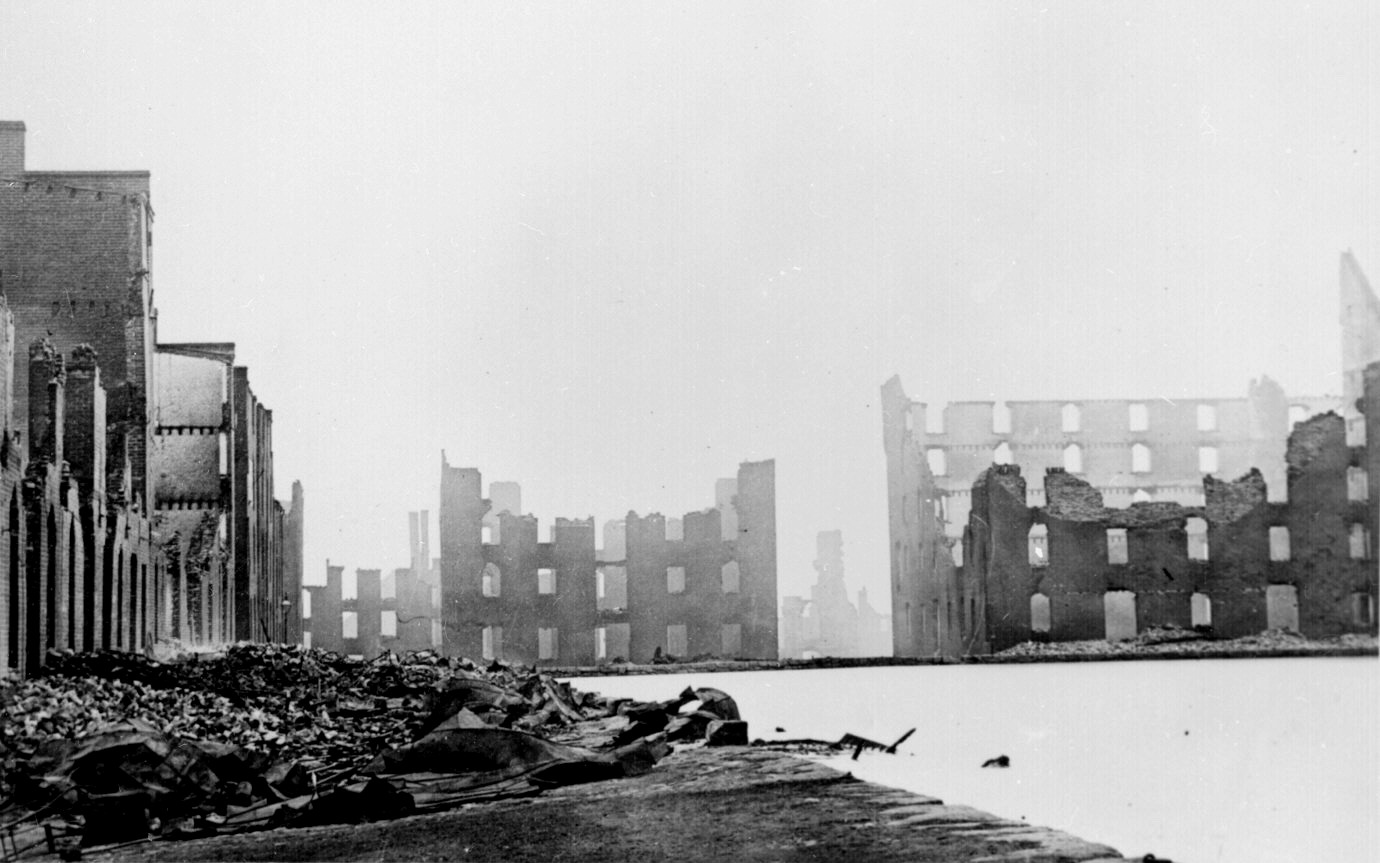
Ruins of the Gallego Mills

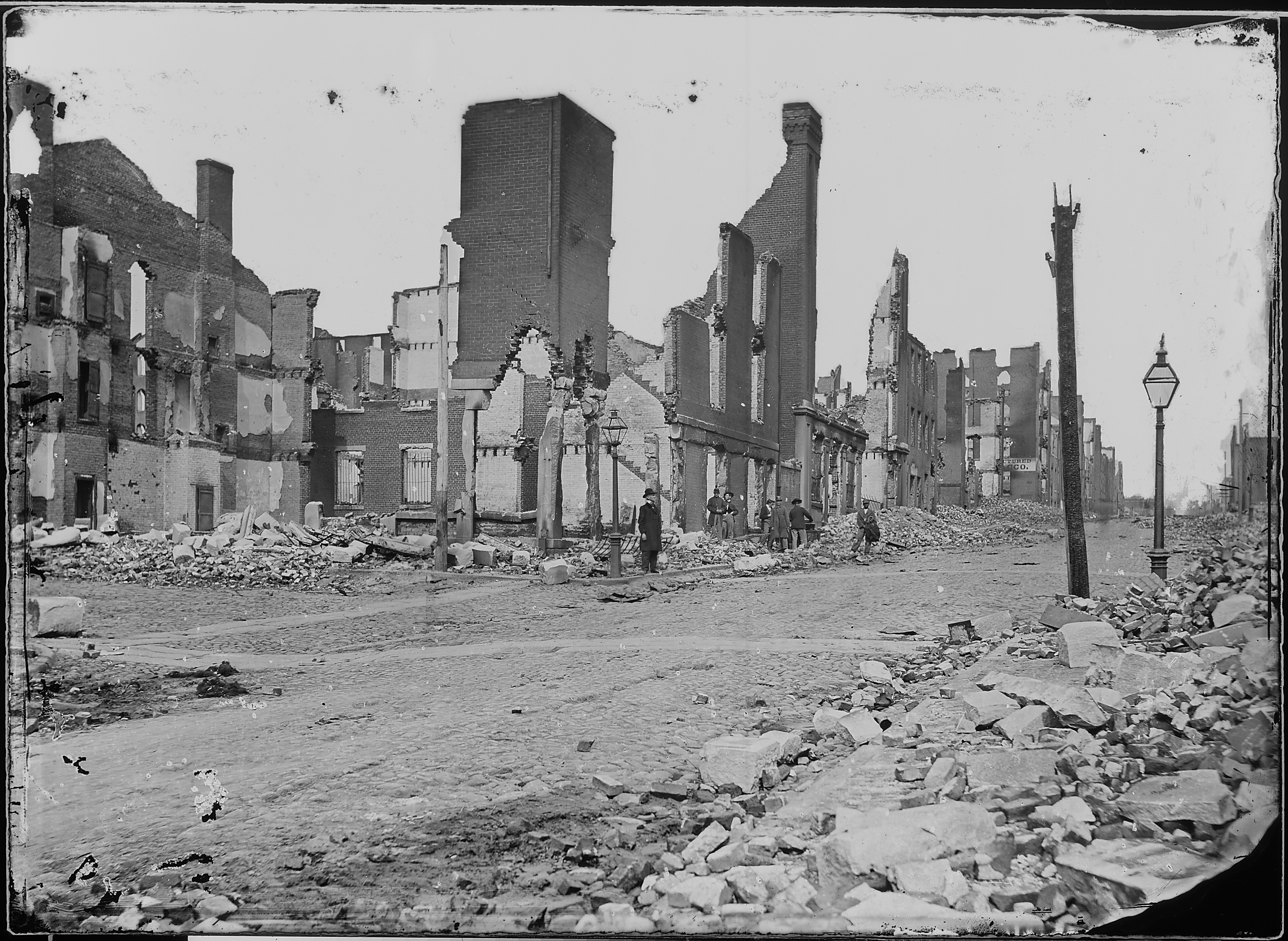
Ruins in the commercial district

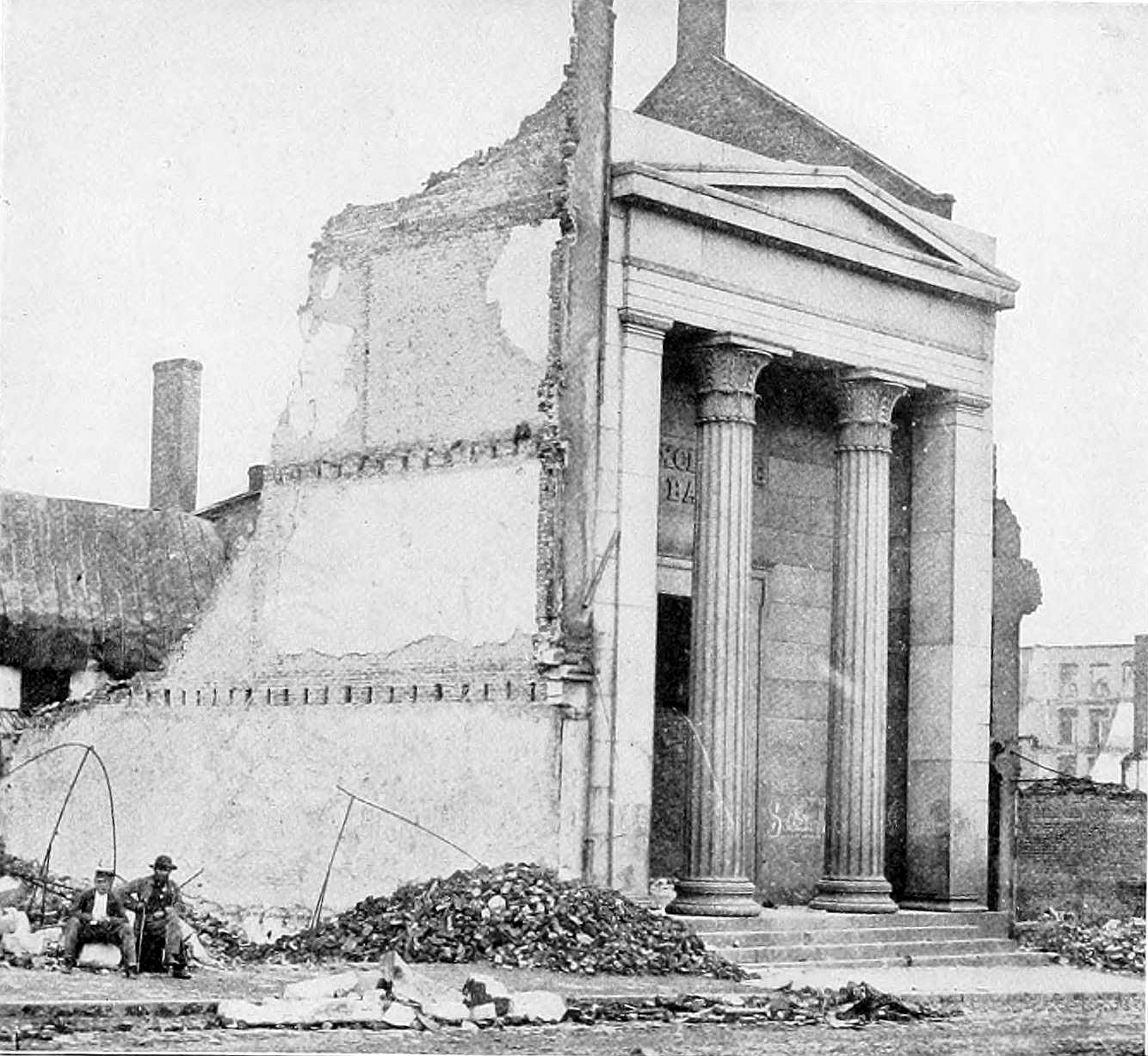
Exchange Bank in Richmond

== Legacy ==
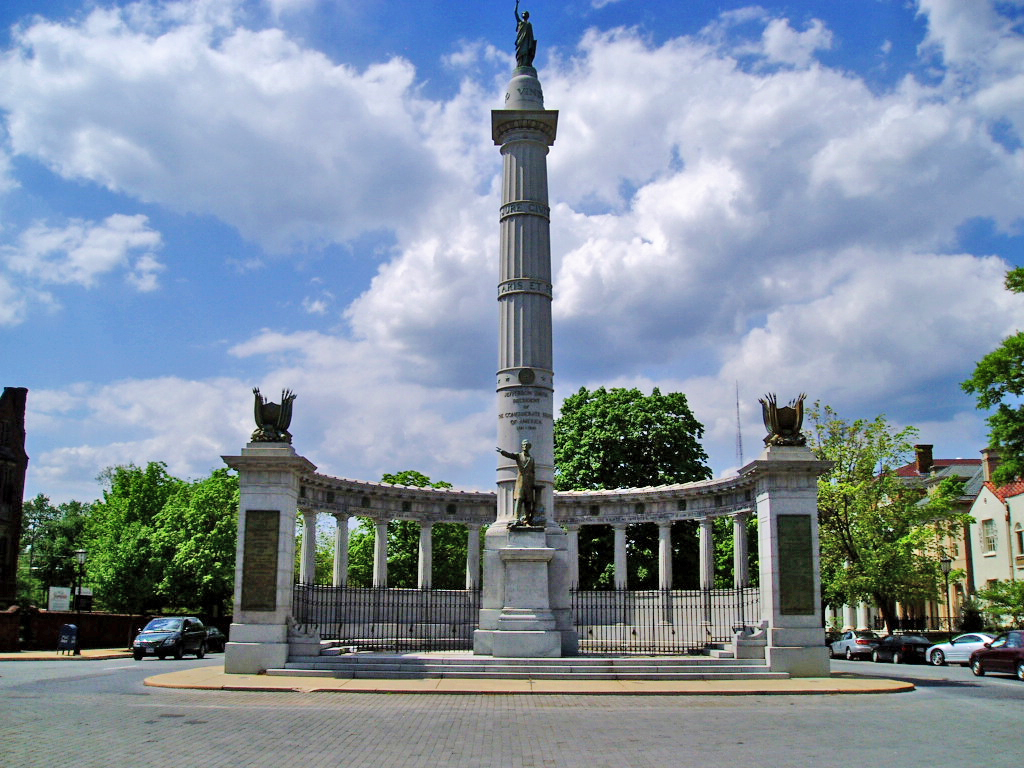
The Jefferson Davis Memorial, formerly located at the intersection of Monument Avenue and Davis Avenue in Richmond

Richmond's Hollywood Cemetery is the final burial place of many Civil War notables, including Jefferson Davis, Stuart, former U.S. president and Confederate Congressman John Tyler, Virginia Governors and Confederate Generals Henry A. Wise and William "Extra Billy" Smith, Tredegar Iron Works owner and Confederate Brigadier General Joseph Reid Anderson, and Major Generals George Pickett, Fitzhugh Lee, Henry Heth, and John Imboden. A large, stone pyramid dominates the Confederate Soldiers' section, where over 18,000 (many of whom are unknown) Confederates are buried.

War dead were also buried at Oakwood Cemetery, Shockoe Hill Cemetery, and the Confederate Soldiers section of the Hebrew Cemetery. Numerous Union dead who were buried at these sites were re-interred after the war to several national cemeteries outside of the city. Over 600 Union Prisoners of War had been originally interred in the Shockoe Hill African Burying Ground, and removed in 1867 to the Richmond National Cemetery.

The city used to have a number of markers and monuments commemorating the Civil War and the city's role in the Confederacy. Monument Avenue was laid out in 1887, with a series of monuments at various intersections honoring the city's Confederate heroes. Included (east to west) were J.E.B. Stuart, Robert E. Lee, Jefferson Davis, Stonewall Jackson, and Matthew F. Maury.

The Richmond National Battlefield Park, a unit of the National Park Service, maintains several battlefields from the Peninsula Campaign and subsequent actions. A driving tour through Civil War sites in Richmond and its surrounding counties is maintained by Virginia Civil War Trails. The White House of the Confederacy (part of the private, non-profit Museum of the Confederacy) has been fully restored to its wartime appearance and is open for daily tours. Immediately next door to the White House, the internationally renowned Museum of the Confederacy houses the largest comprehensive collection of artifacts and personal effects relating to the Confederacy. Other museums include the Virginia Historical Society. A statue of Lincoln, commemorating his visit to the former Confederate capitol, was unveiled in 2003, causing controversy.

== In popular culture ==
The Charlie Daniels Band song, "Trudy", compares the taking of Richmond by Grant with the narrator saying that he was "raking in chips like Grant took Richmond" in a poker game.

In 1969 The Band released "The Night They Drove Old Dixie Down", which features the lyric, "...by May the 10th (1865) Richmond had fell, it was a time I remember oh so well". On May 10, 1865, Confederate President Jefferson Davis, fleeing Richmond and having dissolved the Confederate government, was captured by Union forces in Irwinville, Georgia.

The Richmond-based punk band Love Roses features an image of the famous Currier and Ives print of the city burning as the cover art for their album A New Reason for the Same Old Mistakes.
