= Shockoe Creek =

Coordinates: 37°33′14″N 77°25′28″W

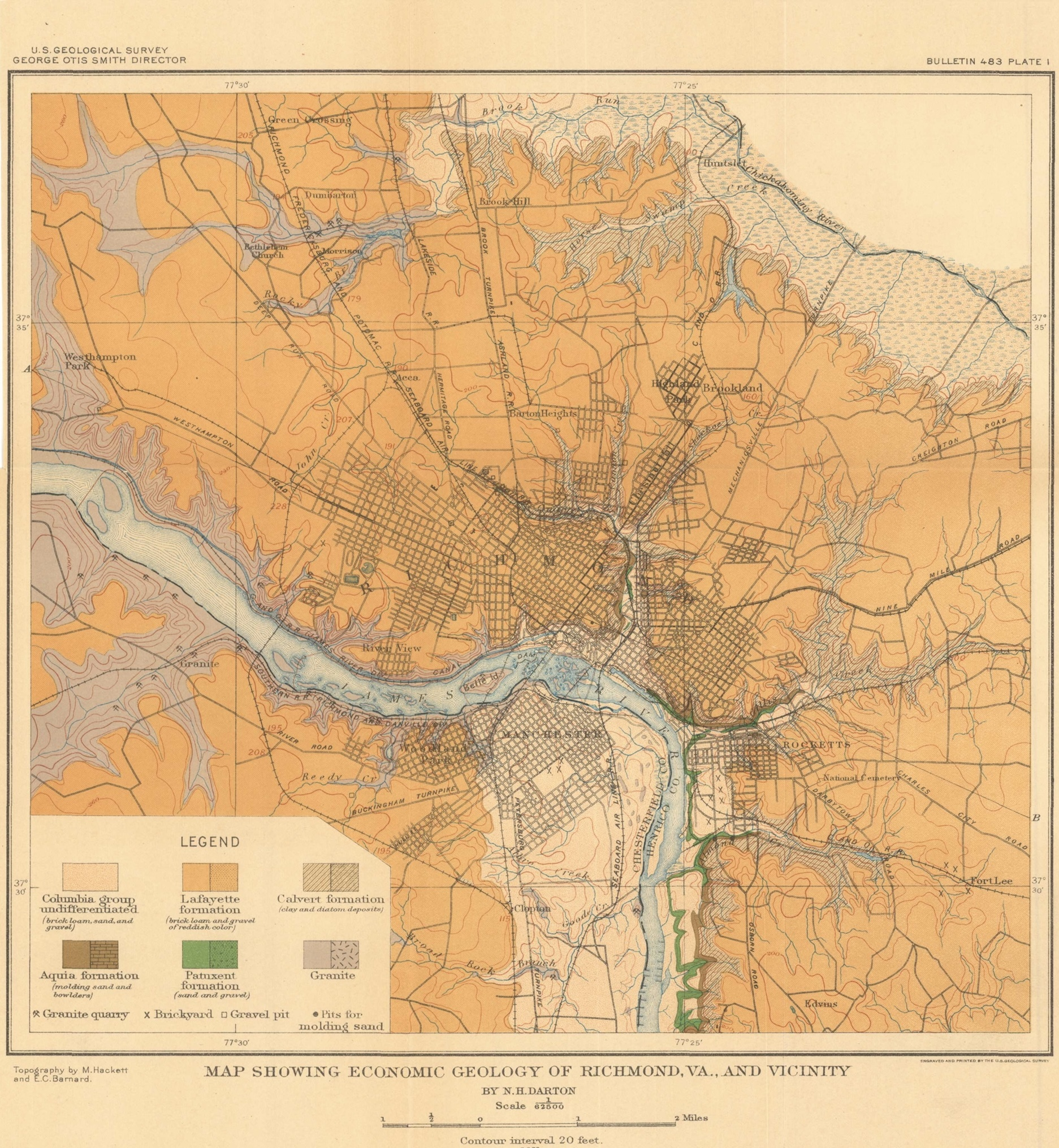
Richmond City, mapped c. 1911

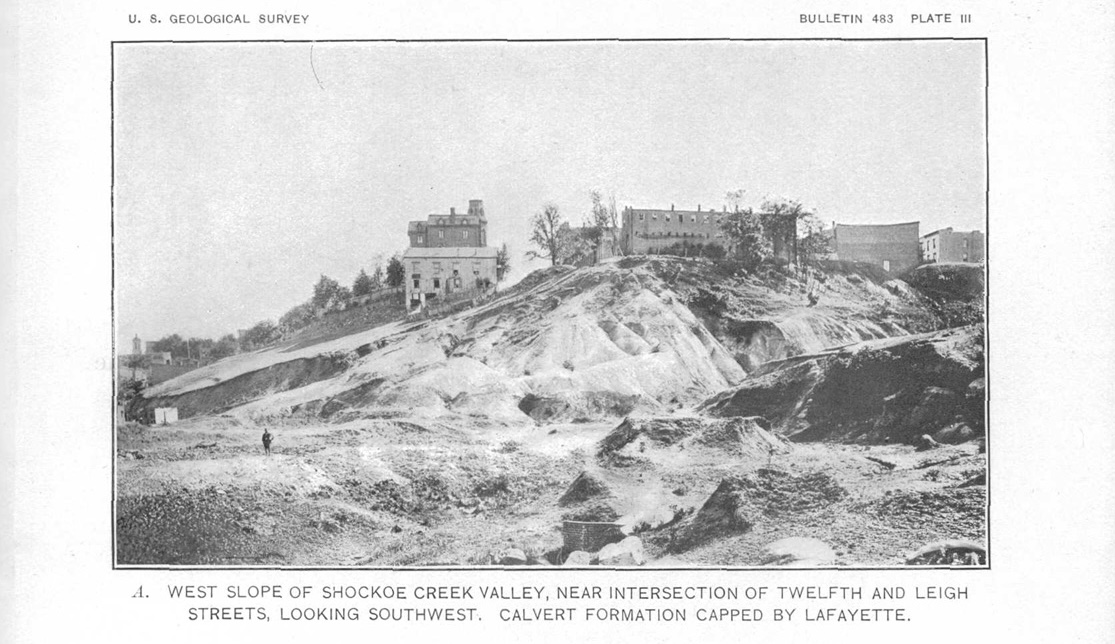
Shockoe Creek cut through Richmond

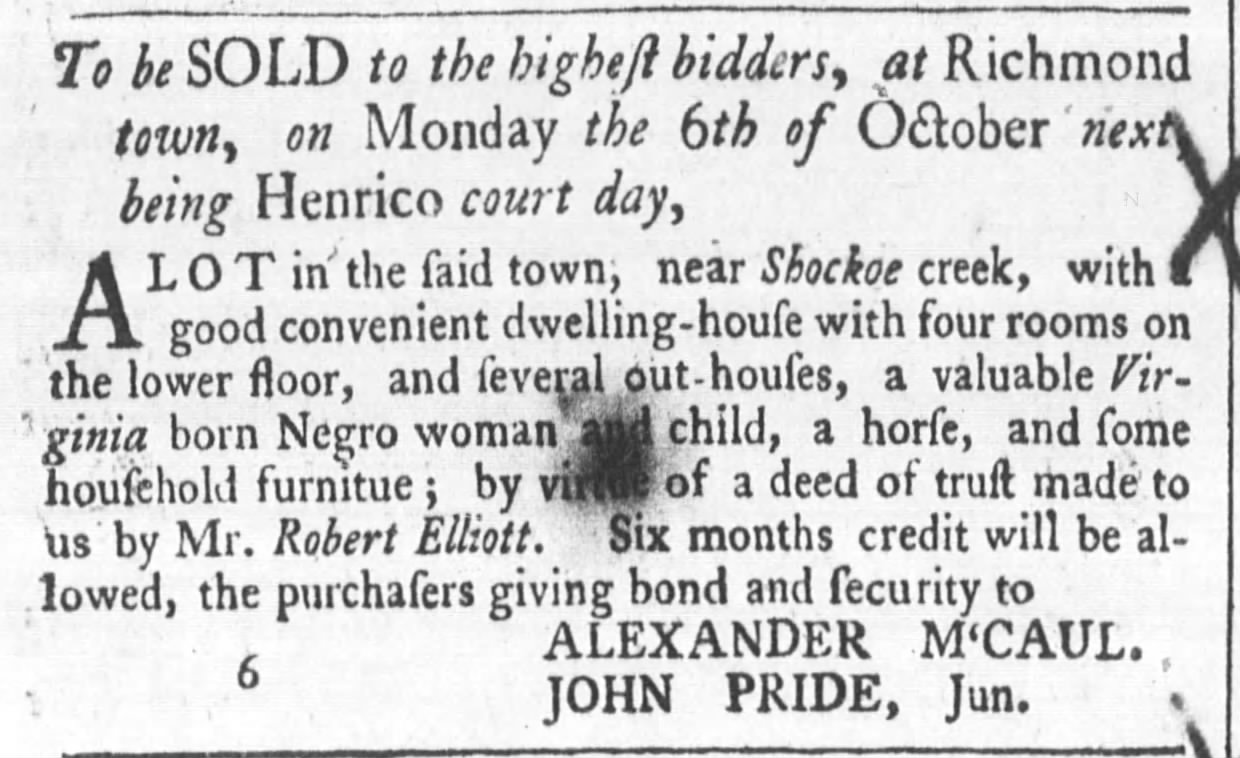
Land (and slaves) along Shockoe Creek listed for sale, 1766

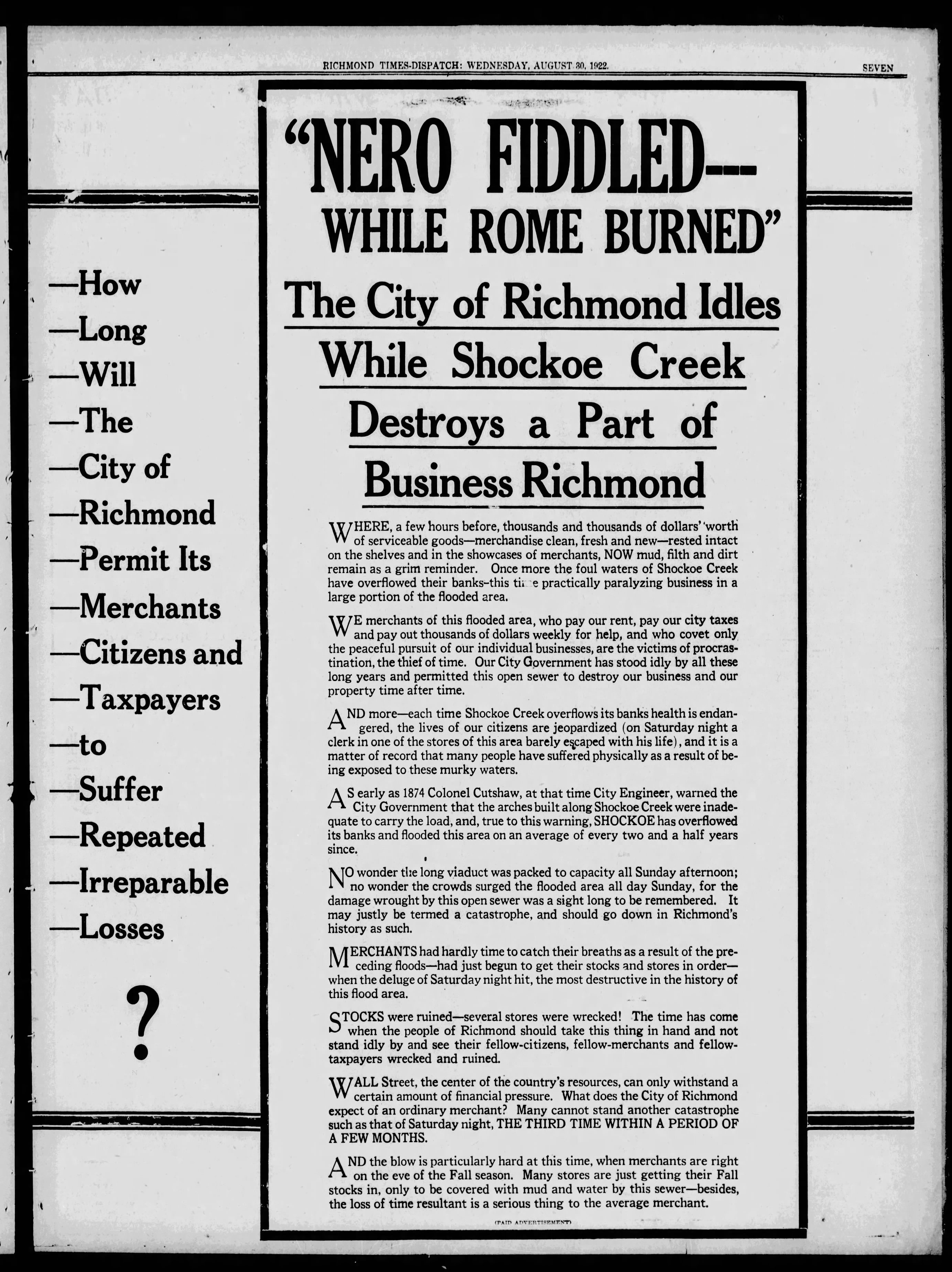
Local business owners protested Shockoe Creek flooding (Richmond Times Dispatch, 1922)

Shockoe Creek is a watercourse in Virginia, United States, tributary to the James River. The Shockoe Creek watershed drained "portions of Richmond's North Side, near West End, downtown and northeast Henrico County." Historic tributaries of Shockoe Creek included Bacon's Quarter Branch and Gum Tree Creek.

Shockoe Creek marked the western border of Richmond when it was incorporated as a municipality in 1742. The Shockoe Bottom neighborhood was the slave-trading district of Richmond, Virginia prior to the American Civil War. There were two water-powered mills along the creek in the 19th century. The creek has been channelized for flood control and pollution management since the 1920s.

== See also ==
- Shockoe Valley
- Shockoe Bottom African Burial Ground
- Shockoe Hill
- Shockoe Hill African Burying Ground
- Shockoe Hill Burying Ground Historic District
- Shockoe Hill Cemetery
