= Shockoe Hill =

Area of Richmond, Virginia, US

Coordinates: 37°32′54″N 77°25′39″W

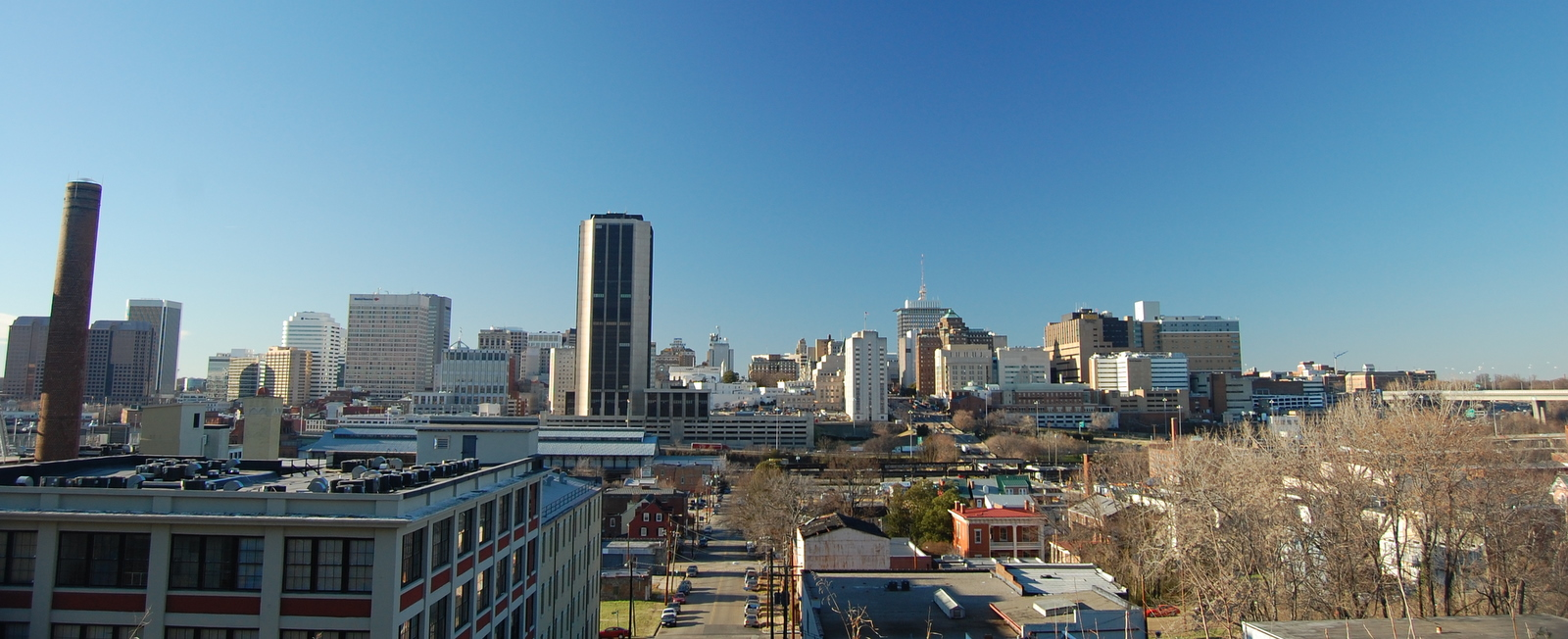
View of Shockoe Hill from Church Hill

Shockoe Hill is one of several hills on which much of the oldest portion of the City of Richmond, Virginia, U.S., was built. It extends from the downtown area, including where the Virginia State Capitol complex sits, north almost a mile to a point where the hill falls off sharply to the winding path of Shockoe Creek. Interstate 95 now bisects the hill, separating the highly urbanized downtown portion from the more residential northern portion.

Near the northern edge of Shockoe Hill are two important cemeteries. Shockoe Hill Cemetery is the burial place of Chief Justice John Marshall, American Revolutionary War hero Peter Francisco, Union spy Elizabeth Van Lew, and many other notables. It also is the resting place of many Confederate States of America soldiers. Over five hundred deceased Union Army POWs were buried in the Shockoe Hill African Burying Ground. The graves were located to the north and to the east of the City Hospital building (outside the eastern wall of Shockoe Hill Cemetery), and also in the vicinity of the Poorhouse. The remains of the soldiers were moved after the War to the Richmond National Cemetery.

The first Richmond Theatre (originally called Quesnay's Academy) was built on the brow of Shockoe Hill. It opened in 1786.

The Hebrew Cemetery of Richmond, founded in 1816, contains within it what is reputed to be the largest Jewish military burial ground in the world outside of Tel Aviv. Many of Richmond's Jewish elite, including William Thalhimer, founder of the Thalhimers department store, are found there.

Next to the Hebrew Cemetery is The Almshouse building, built in 1860 as a replacement to the city's 1806 poor house which was located in or about the same spot. The new Almshouse building first saw service as an American Civil War hospital and which in 1864-65 briefly served as the home of the Virginia Military Institute Corps of Cadets. Many Confederate soldiers buried in the two cemeteries had died while hospitalized in that building.

The long unacknowledged burial ground for the enslaved and free people of color, the Shockoe Hill African Burying Ground which in the 1870s came to be labeled on maps as "Potter's Field", is located at 5th and Hospital St. On the 1816 Plan of the City of Richmond Property it appears as the "Burying Ground for Free People of Colour" (One Acre), and the "Burying Ground for Negroes" (One Acre). On the 1817 Map of the City of Richmond it appears as "Free People of Colour's B.G." and "Negro(e's) B.G.". On the 1835 Plan of the City of Richmond it appears as the "Grave Yard for Free People of Colour" and "For Slaves". On the 1849 Plan of Richmond it is called the "Burying-ground for Coloured Persons". On the 1853 Smith's Map of Henrico County, Virginia it appears as the "African Burying Ground". Its original 2 acres is on the opposite side of 5th Street directly to the east of the Hebrew Cemetery and on both sides of Hospital Street, as the street was run through it. This cemetery originally comprised one acre for free people of color and one acre for slaves. It was established in 1816 by the City of Richmond and though segregated, it was a part of the Shockoe Hill Burying Ground also known as the Shockoe Hill Cemetery. The Shockoe Hill African Burying Ground was greatly expanded in size over time. It encompassed slightly more than 31 acres. This land, however, contains nothing on its surface that would cause it to be visibly recognizable as a cemetery today. It is presently referred to by some as the "2nd African Burial Ground" or "second African Burying Ground", and "African Burial Ground II".
