= Oakwood Cemetery (Richmond, Virginia) =

Historic cemetery

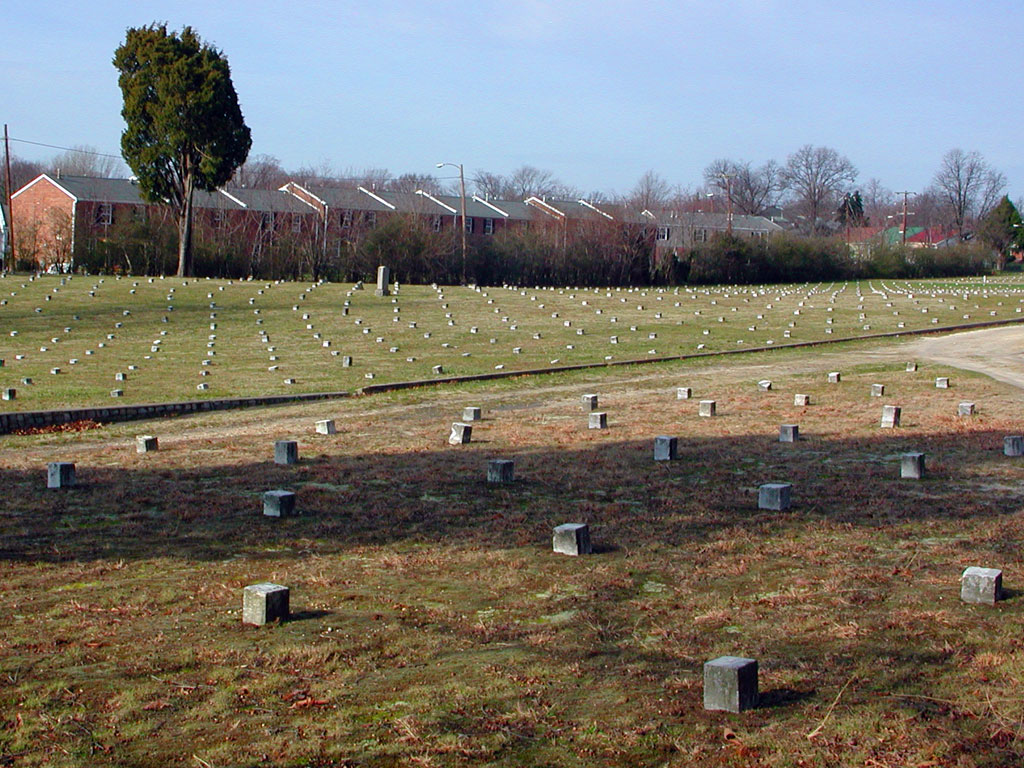
- View of a small portion of the Confederate Section
- Interactive map of Oakwood Cemetery

Details
- Established: 1854
- Location: Richmond, Virginia
- Country: United States
- Coordinates: 37°32′15″N 77°23′55″W
- Owned by: City of Richmond
- Size: 176 acres (71 ha)
- No. of interments: >48,000
- Website: restoreoakwood.com
- Find a Grave: Oakwood Cemetery

Oakwood Cemetery is a large, city-owned burial ground in the East End of Richmond, Virginia. It holds over 48,000 graves, including many soldiers from the Civil War.

== History ==
The City of Richmond purchased land in 1799 on the northern end of Shockoe Hill, for the main purpose of establishing a municipal burying ground. The Shockoe Hill Cemetery was established on those grounds in 1820. When space became scarce for new burials, the city responded by expanding the burying ground with the addition of 14 acres in 1850. Five of those acres were added to the walled Shockoe Hill Cemetery for white interments, and the remainder was added to the portion of the burying ground there located outside of the walls, reserved for the interment of people of colour and the enslaved (that portion of the burying ground was established in 1816). The city further responded by buying two tracts of land in what was then Henrico County in 1854, totaling 66 acres (27 ha). This land became Oakwood Cemetery. In early March 1855 the Committee on the Oakwood Cemetery and its Superintendent were ready to receive applications for interment of white persons who did not wish to buy a section, and for persons of color. In May 1855 it was reported that portion of ground intended for colored burials was ready, and a number of interments had already been made in it. However; the number of African American interments there was low, until after the closing of the Shockoe Hill African Burying Ground in June 1879. The Oakwood Cemetery Committee was a standing committee of the Richmond City Council.

In 1861, Richmond was named the capital of the new Confederate States of America. After the Civil War broke out, the city's hospitals and clinics received a large number of critically wounded soldiers. The City Council agreed to provide interment for soldiers who died in Richmond or Henrico County, and in July 1862 offered to have Oakwood Cemetery opened for large scale burial of Confederate soldiers, and set aside a separate section of the grounds for this purpose.

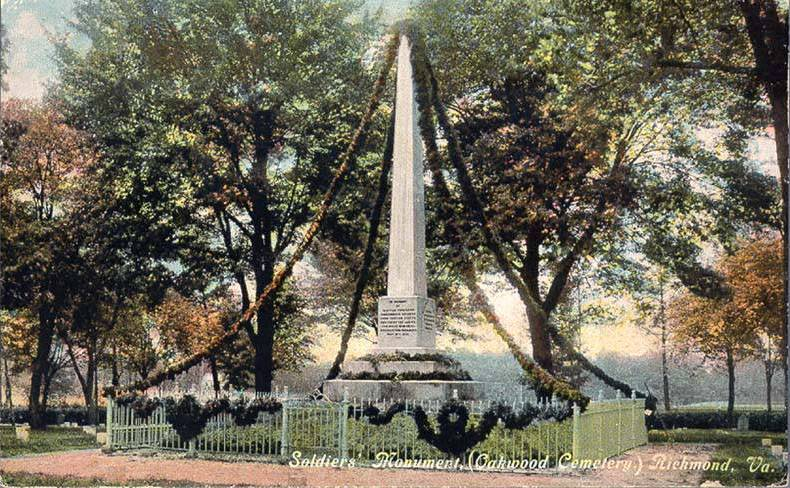
Soldiers Monument 1911.

Oakwood Cemetery was set as the final resting place of soldiers who died in treatment at Chimborazo Hospital, a massive facility on Church Hill. By the end of the war, the Confederate section of the cemetery covered about 7.5 acres (3.0 ha) and contained around 17,000 burials.

The United States Congress passed a resolution in 1866, a year after the war's end, providing for the creation of a system of national cemeteries for the interment of veterans and war dead. The resolution also called, controversially, for the removal of Union war dead and re-interment in the new national cemeteries. The Richmond National Cemetery received the remains of 5,896 Union Soldiers from 09/01/1866 – 09/30/1867. Of that number, 1,432 were re-interments of soldiers originally interred in Oakwood Cemetery.

On February 20, 1871 the Commission on Cemeteries reported to the Richmond City Council that Shockoe Hill Cemetery had been entirely filled up, leaving Oakwood the only City cemetery in which a person could purchase a section or part of one, or in which a person unable to buy the whole or part of a section could be decently buried. As Oakwood was limited in space, a recommendation was made that additional adjacent land be purchased for the interment of colored persons, (to be laid off into such sections as may be desired), and for the interment of those unable to buy a section. It was further mentioned that colored persons from Howard's Grove Hospital, a State Asylum, were actively being buried in Oakwood, which gave another reason for purchasing additional ground. Applications from various societies, as well as individuals, for sections were being received. The Committee therefore requested for an appropriation of two thousand five hundred dollars, for the laying of drive and walk ways, and for the making and laying off of sections, and for other essential additions or improvements. In June 1879 the burials of colored persons ceased completely at Shockoe Hill, and all new interments were then made at Oakwood Cemetery. Along with this shift in interments from one burial ground to the other came a new problem for Oakwood Cemetery, one that had been long prevalent in the colored burying ground on Shockoe Hill (Shockoe Hill African Burying Ground). The problem was grave robberies or body snatching. Graves were routinely robbed to supply medical cadavers for the medical colleges, especially the Medical College of Virginia (now VCU), and the University of Virginia. In 1878 it was discovered that Oakwood was being robbed of its dead.

Oakwood Cemetery today covers about 176 acres (71 ha) of ground, and continues to be maintained by the City of Richmond and various charitable trusts.

== Notable burials ==
- Ulric Dahlgren (1842–1864), Union Army Colonel
- Reddy Foster (1864–1908), MLB catcher for the New York Giants
- Minnie Jahnke (1872–1954), jeweler

== See also ==
- Hollywood Cemetery (Richmond, Virginia)
