= Minnie Jahnke =

American jeweler (1872–1954)

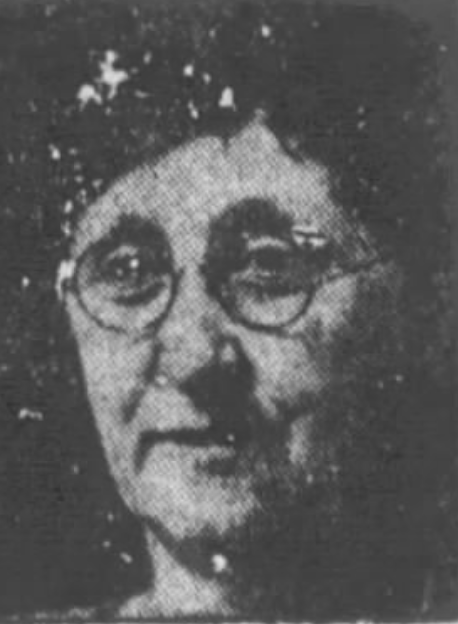
- Minnie A. Jahnke, from a 1923 newspaper
- Born: Minnie Augusta Jahnke; October 11, 1872; Bon Air, Virginia, U.S.
- Died: March 14, 1954 (aged 81); Richmond, Virginia, U.S.
- Resting place: Oakwood Cemetery
- Occupation: Jeweler
- Years active: 1900 to 1953

Minnie Augusta Jahnke (October 11, 1872 – March 14, 1954) was an American jeweler, based in Richmond, Virginia.

== Early life ==
Minnie Augusta Jahnke was born at "Shady Echo", her family's farm in Bon Air, Virginia, one of the ten children of Albert Franz Jahnke and Mary Beaufort Chalkley Jahnke. Her father was a jeweler, trained in Germany before he arrived in the United States. Several of her brothers were also jewelers.

== Career ==
When her brother died in the 1930s, Minnie Jahnke took over the family's jewelry shop in Richmond, where she had already worked for many years. She was known for buying, selling, and appraising antique gold, silver, clocks, gemstones, and other heirlooms, for prominent Southern families. She closed the business in 1952.

Minnie Jahnke was an active member of the Second Presbyterian Church in Richmond, and a charter member of Richmond's Quota Club and the Business and Professional Women's Club, involved in clubwork at the local and national levels.

== Personal life ==
Jahnke died in 1954, aged 81 years, at a hospital in Richmond. She was buried in Oakwood Cemetery. A road near Richmond is named for the Jahnke family of jewelers. The Jahnke family papers are held at the Valentine Museum in Richmond.
