= Shockoe Hill Burying Ground Historic District =

Hospital-cemetery complex in Virginia, U.S.

Coordinates: 37°33′05″N 77°25′46″W

- U.S. National Register of Historic Places
- U.S. Historic district
- Virginia Landmarks Register
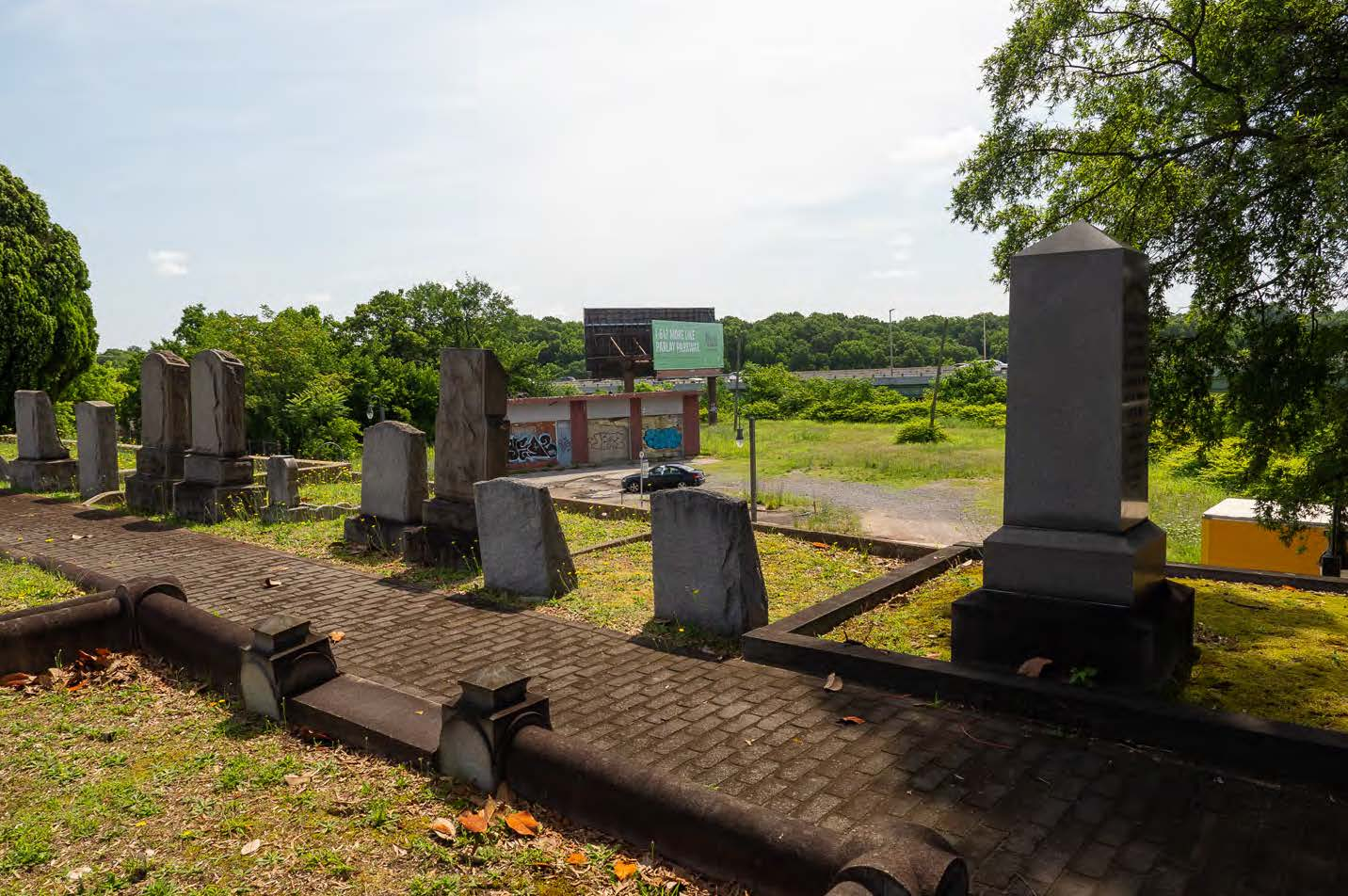
- View is from the eastern edge of the hill of the Hebrew Cemetery looking northeast across 5th St. to the original 1816 site of the Shockoe Hill African Burying Ground.
- Location: Bounded by 2nd St., northern limit of CSX right-of-way (now Virginia Passenger Rail Authority), Richmond, Virginia, U.S.
- NRHP reference No.: 100007793
- VLR No.: 127-7231
- Added to NRHP: June 16, 2022

The Shockoe Hill Burying Ground Historic District is a historic district located in the city of Richmond, Virginia, and is a significant example of a municipal almshouse–public hospital–cemetery complex of the sort that arose in the period of the New Republic, following disestablishment of the Anglican Church. The district illustrates changing social and racial relationships in Richmond through the New Republic, Antebellum, Civil War, Reconstruction, and Jim Crow/Lost Cause eras of the nineteenth and twentieth centuries.

It was listed to the National Register of Historic Places on June 16, 2022; and listed on the Virginia Landmarks Register on March 17, 2022.

== History ==
The Shockoe Hill Burying Ground Historic District occupies 43 acres (17 ha) of land bounded to the south by E. Bates Street, to the north by the northern limit of the Virginia Passenger Rail Authority (previously the CSX rail line) right-of-way (City of Richmond parcel #N0000233022) at the southern margin of the Bacon's Quarter Branch valley, to the west by 2nd Street, and to the east by the historic edge of the City property at the former location of Shockoe Creek. The District encompasses most of a 28.5-acre (11.5 ha) tract acquired by the city of Richmond in 1799 to fulfill several municipal functions, along with later additions to this original tract.

The district features a suite of municipal functions and services concerned with matters of public welfare, health, and safety, which the City of Richmond relegated to its then-periphery on its northern boundary during the nineteenth century. It includes three properties which have long been recognized and celebrated, that are individually listed on the Virginia Landmarks Register and the National Register of Historic Places: the Almshouse, Shockoe Hill Cemetery, and Hebrew Cemetery. It additionally includes four newly identified sites: the City Hospital and Colored Almshouse Site, the City Powder Magazine Site, the Poor House of 1806, and the Shockoe Hill African Burying Ground. The district was also the site of the city gallows.

The Shockoe Hill African Burying Ground is likely the largest burial ground for free people of color and the enslaved in the United States. It is conservatively estimated that over 22,000 people of African descent were buried in its 31 acres (13 ha). It was opened in 1816, and closed in 1879 due to overcrowded conditions. It is one of "Virginia's most endangered historic places". Current threats to the burial ground include the DC2RVA passenger rail project (high-speed rail), the east-west Commonwealth Corridor, and the proposed widening of I-64, along with various infrastructure projects.

== See also ==
- National Register of Historic Places listings in Richmond, Virginia
