= Shockoe Hill Cemetery =

Historic cemetery in Virginia, United States

- U.S. National Register of Historic Places
- Virginia Landmarks Register
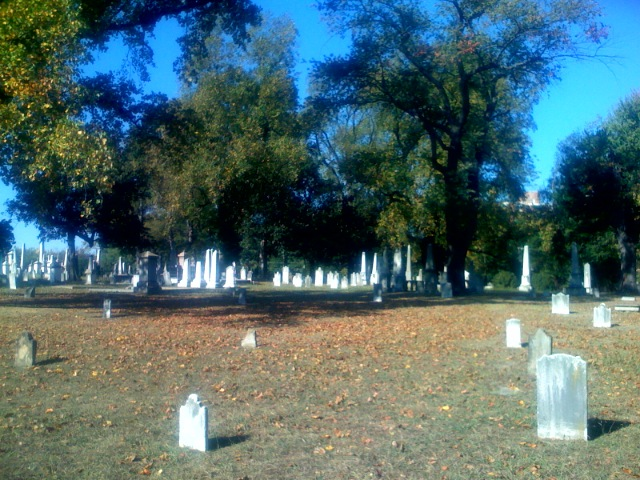

- Location within Virginia Location within the United States
- Location: Jct. of Hospital and 2nd Sts., Richmond, Virginia
- Coordinates: 37°33′5″N 77°25′56″W
- Area: 13 acres (5.3 ha)
- Built: 1820
- Architect: Davies, John W.; et al.
- Architectural style: Late Victorian, Early Republic, 19th-century Exotic Revival
- NRHP reference No.: 95000818
- VLR No.: 127-0389

Significant dates
- Added to NRHP: July 7, 1995
- Designated VLR: April 28, 1995

The Shockoe Hill Cemetery is a historic cemetery located on Shockoe Hill in Richmond, Virginia.

== History ==
Shockoe Hill Cemetery, as it is presently called, was established by the City of Richmond in 1820, with the initial burial made in 1822. It was earlier known as the "New Burying Ground" or the "Shockoe Hill Burying Ground". This cemetery has long been recognized as the city of Richmond's first truly municipal cemetery for white persons —- that is, the first to be conceived, opened, and operated using detailed record-keeping, by the City of Richmond. (A portion of the cemetery surrounding St. John's Church, founded by the Anglican Church, was owned and operated by the City as a municipal burying ground.) Shockoe Hill Cemetery expanded in 1833, in 1850, and in 1871, when it reached its present size of 12.7 acres. Before 1820, the City had opened and operated two municipal cemeteries for free and enslaved Black Richmonders: the Shockoe Bottom African Burial Ground (historically called the Burial Ground for Negroes), in 1799, and in 1816 the "Burying Ground for Free People of Color and the Burying Ground for Negroes (enslaved)", now called the "Shockoe Hill African Burying Ground" (see below)).

Among many notables interred at the Shockoe Hill Cemetery are Chief Justice John Marshall, Unionist spymaster Elizabeth Van Lew, Revolutionary War hero Peter Francisco, and Virginia Governor William H. Cabell. More than thirteen hundred servicemen are known to be buried here, including at least 22 Revolutionary War veterans; at least 400 War of 1812 veterans; and an estimated 900 Civil War soldiers, both veterans and wartime casualties. Members of the General Society of the War of 1812 have suggested that more veterans of that War are buried at Shockoe Hill, than at any other cemetery in the country.

More than 500 Union Army prisoners of war had been buried in Shockoe Hill Cemetery's adjoining African Burying Ground during the Civil War, but the soldiers remains were moved in 1866 to Richmond National Cemetery, three miles to the east. Two markers, one placed by the United Daughters of the Confederacy in 1938, and the other by the Military Order of the Loyal Legion of the United States (a/k/a MOLLUS) in 2002, memorialize those POW burials.

The Cemetery is open to burials of family members in existing family plots; the last such burial occurred in 2003. In July 2016 the City reclaimed title to several unused plots, on one of which there are plans to install a columbarium with niches to hold urns with cremated remains. Those plots (and eventually, niches) are available for purchase by the general public, marking the first sale of grave spaces in the Cemetery since about 1900. Shockoe Hill Cemetery is across Hospital Street from the Hebrew Cemetery of Richmond, a separate and privately owned cemetery.

Shockoe Hill Cemetery is on the Virginia Landmarks Register and National Register of Historic Places. The City still owns and maintains the cemetery. The Friends of Shockoe Hill Cemetery, a volunteer group formed in 2006, acts as a steward of the cemetery and assist with upkeep and improvement, including organizing the placement of government-issue military markers.

The City of Richmond acquired a 28 and 1/2-acre parcel in 1799 for the main purpose of creating a burial ground for white persons. On that same property, the City also established a "Poor-house" for indigent citizens. The land was well outside the center core of the City, located on its northern edge and extending into Henrico County. The earliest interments made there were of people who died at the Poor-house. The parcel eventually was divided to contain the walled Shockoe Hill Cemetery, and also a burial place for Richmonders of color, established on the northeast corner of 5th and Hospital streets, where burials began in 1816. This burial ground was originally composed of two adjacent one-acre plots, the "Burying Ground for Free People of Colour" and the "Burying Ground for Negroes" (Enslaved). Taken together, this ground for people of African descent (the Shockoe Hill African Burying Ground) was also greatly expanded over the following fifty years. The 1835 Plan of the City of Richmond shows an expansion of at least an acre to the slave burying ground. In 1850, when the city added 5 acres to the walled Shockoe Hill Cemetery, it also added 9 acres to what would come to be labeled on the 1853 Map of the County of Henrico as the "African Burying Ground", and additionally included the City Hospital grounds. An 1816 plan of the city property also depicts the areas in which people of colour and white persons who died at the Poor-house were interred.

This now-invisible Shockoe Hill African Burying Ground, functioned as a segregated adjunct to Shockoe Hill Cemetery until it was closed to burials in 1879. Its grounds eventually were disposed of by the city, some of which became part of the Hebrew Cemetery. This burying ground is today also referred to by some as the "2nd African Burial Ground" or "second African Burying Ground" and "African Burial Ground II". It has suffered numerous atrocities over time, and to this day continues to be threatened. Present threats include the DC2RVA high-speed passenger rail project, and the east-west Commonwealth Corridor, the proposed widening of I-64, as well as various infrastructure projects.

The Shockoe Hill African Burying Ground had never been included in the historical designations of the Shockoe Hill Cemetery, or the Hebrew Cemetery, and had been largely forgotten. However, on July 28, 2021 a newly completed nomination for the Shockoe Hill Burying Ground Historic District was submitted to the Virginia Department of Historic Resources (DHR), seeking inclusion in the Virginia Landmarks Register (VR) and the National Register of Historic Places (NRHP). The Shockoe Hill African Burying Ground is a part of the historic district. On March 17, 2022 the nomination was presented to the Virginia Board of Historic Resources, and the State Review Board. By their unanimous decision, the Shockoe Hill Burying Ground Historic District was added to the Virginia Landmarks Register. The nomination was then reviewed and considered by the National Park Service for inclusion in the National Register of Historic Places. Effective June 16, 2022 the Shockoe Hill Burying Ground Historic District was officially listed on the National Register of Historic Places.

== Notable burials ==
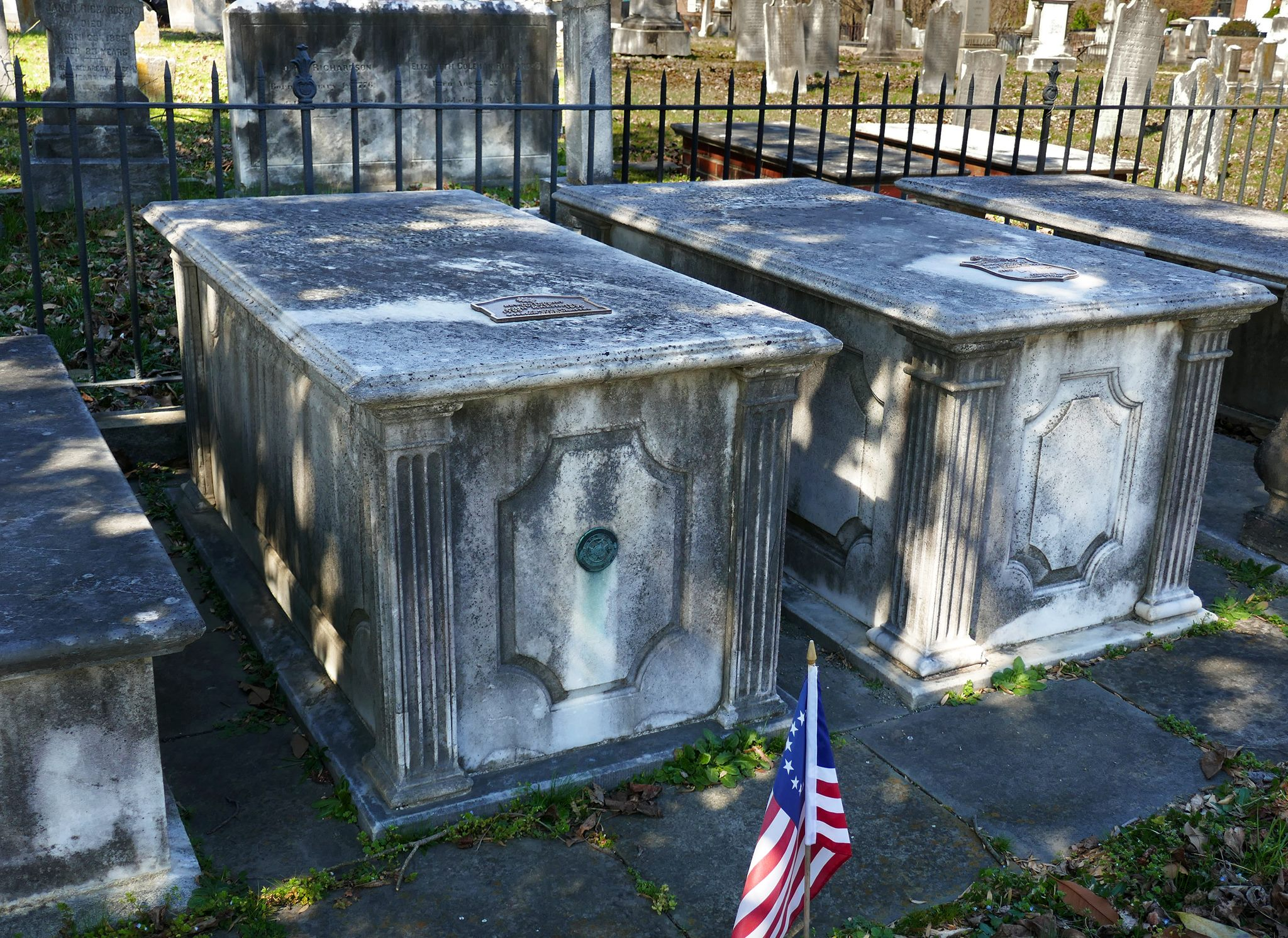
Crypts of Chief Justice John Marshall (left) and his wife, Mary Willis Ambler Marshall, in Shockoe Hill Cemetery, Richmond, VA.

Shockoe Hill Cemetery holds the graves of Chief Justice John Marshall; attorney John Wickham (counsel for Aaron Burr in Burr's 1807 treason trial); Revolutionary War hero Peter Francisco; famed Union spy Elizabeth Van Lew, as well as many members of her spy network; Richmond distiller Franklin Stearns, John Minor Botts, a Congressman and later a dedicated Unionist who helped lead opposition to the Confederate government; Virginia Governor William H. Cabell; acting Virginia governors John Mercer Patton (General George S. Patton's great-grandfather), John Rutherfoord, and John Munford Gregory; Judge Dabney Carr; United States Senators Powhatan Ellis and Benjamin W. Leigh; Dr. Daniel Norborne Norton, developer of the Norton grape; more than twenty Revolutionary War veterans; and hundreds of Confederate soldiers. It is believed the more than 400 veterans of the War of 1812 buried here is the largest such assemblage in the country.

Many people important in the life of Edgar Allan Poe, who grew up and lived much of his adult life in Richmond, are interred at Shockoe Hill. Among them are Frances K. Allan, beloved foster-mother to Poe, and her husband John; Sarah Elmira Royster Shelton, perhaps the great love of Poe's life; and Jane Stith Craig Stanard, wife of prominent judge Robert Stanard, a warm friend to a teenaged Poe, and the inspiration for his poem "To Helen". Poe is known to have visited the Cemetery many times in his life.

== See also ==
- List of burial places of justices of the Supreme Court of the United States
