= Richmond National Cemetery =

Historic veterans cemetery in Henrico County, Virginia

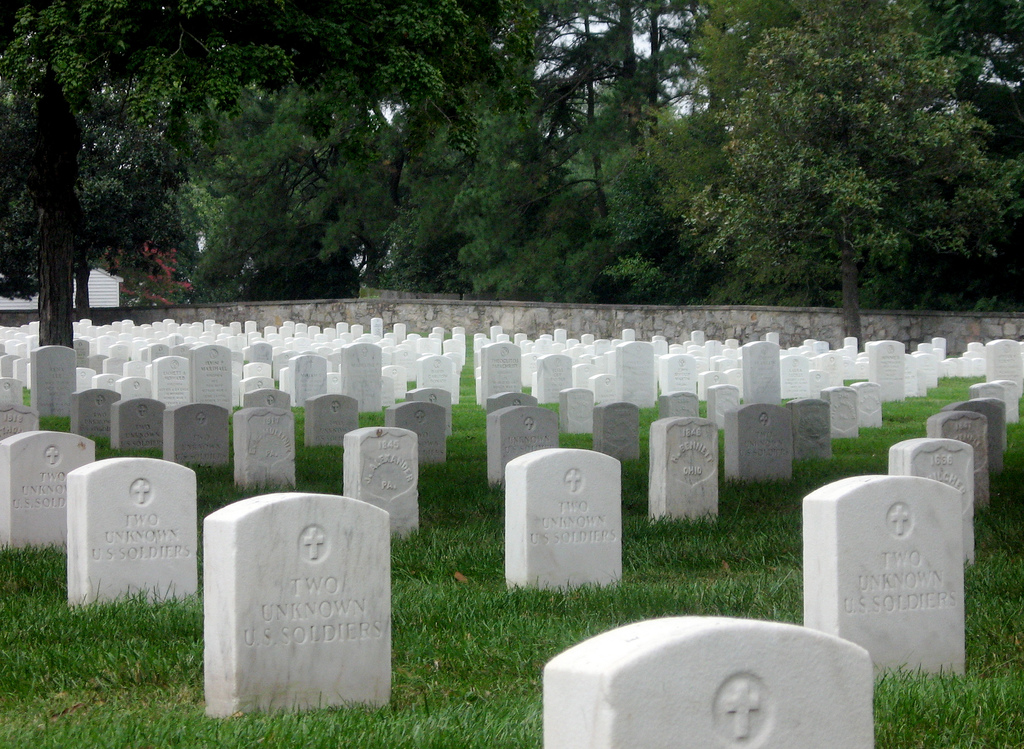
- Richmond National Cemetery.
- Interactive map of Richmond National Cemetery

Details
- Location: Henrico County, Virginia
- Country: United States
- Coordinates: 37°30′53″N 77°23′33″W
- Type: United States National Cemetery
- Size: 9.7 acres (3.9 ha)
- No. of interments: >11,000
- Website: cem.va.gov/CEM/cems/nchp/richmond.asp
- Find a Grave: Richmond National Cemetery
- Richmond National Cemetery
- U.S. National Register of Historic Places
- Virginia Landmarks Register
- Location within Virginia Location within the United States
- Location: 1701 Williamsburg Rd., near Richmond, Virginia
- Coordinates: 37°30′53″N 77°23′33″W
- Area: 9.7 acres (3.9 ha)
- Built: 1866
- Architect: Montgomery C. Meigs
- Architectural style: Second Empire
- MPS: Civil War Era National Cemeteries MPS
- NRHP reference No.: 95001183
- VLR No.: 043-0126

Significant dates
- Added to NRHP: October 26, 1995
- Designated VLR: August 28, 1995

Richmond National Cemetery is a United States National Cemetery three miles (4.8 km) east of Richmond in Henrico County, Virginia. Administered by the United States Department of Veterans Affairs, it encompasses 9.7 acres (3.9 ha), and as of 2021 had more than 11,000 interments. It is closed to new interments. Richmond National Cemetery was listed on the National Register of Historic Places in 1995.

== History ==
The cemetery lies within what was once Richmond's wartime fortification lines built when the Confederate army defended Richmond during the American Civil War. The cemetery was established by the United States Congressional legislation in 1866 but the original plot of land was not formally purchased from local resident William Slater until 1867. Additional land purchases in 1868 and 1906 brought the cemetery to its current size.

The original burials in the cemetery were re-interments from Oakwood Cemetery and Hollywood Cemetery in Richmond. Those re-interments were primarily of Federal Union soldiers who perished from the effects of wounds while prisoners of war in Richmond area military hospitals. Federal dead from the prisoner of war cemetery at Belle Island Prison Camp in the James River were also re-interred here. Some of the dead intended for the Seven Pines National Cemetery and Cold Harbor National Cemetery were transferred to Richmond when those smaller burial grounds quickly reached their capacities from post-war burials and reburials of the dead from the battle of Seven Pines (also known as Fair Oaks) and the battle of Cold Harbor.

Also re-interred in the Richmond National Cemetery were the remains of more than 500 Union prisoners of war, originally interred in the "Shockoe Hill African Burying Ground", the city of Richmond's second African Burying Ground. The "Shockoe Hill African Burying Ground" was Shockoe Hill Cemetery's segregated burying ground for slaves and free people of color.

Military veterans from later eras were also buried here before the cemetery reached capacity.

== Description ==
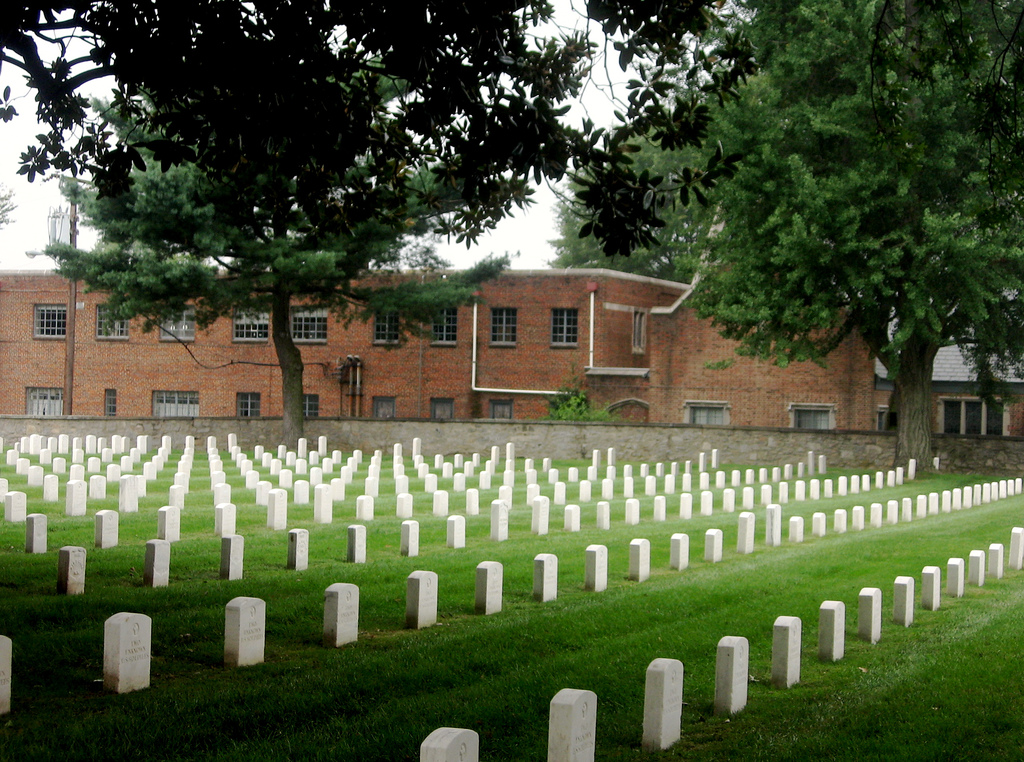
Richmond National Cemetery

The site is rectangular in shape and enclosed by a granite and sandstone wall, extending approximately 2,588 feet (789 m), constructed c. 1890. The main entrance is at the center of the north side and is protected by ornamental wrought iron gates supported by ornamental cast iron posts. Graves are marked with upright marble headstones.

The lodge was constructed in 1870 from a design by Quartermaster General Montgomery C. Meigs and is Second Empire in style. It is an L-shaped brick and stone structure with a slate mansard and tin roof. The main portion is one-and-one-half stories with dormer windows projecting from the mansard roof. The first floor contains an entry porch, living room, dining room, kitchen and office. The upper story contains two bed-rooms and a bath. The lodge also contains a basement, which is divided into two rooms by a masonry wall. A single-story rear addition was constructed c. 1900. There is a total of 1,501 square feet (139.4 m^{2}) of living space. The windows on the first story are one-over-one double-hung sash, while the upper-story windows are modern one-over-one sash replacements. The interior is finished with hardwood floors. The old porch was demolished in 1936 and a new larger porch constructed.

A 16-foot (4.9 m) octagonal iron gazebo, Chinese Chippendale in style, was constructed c. 1890 in the north-east segment of the cemetery at the intersection of Sections 13-A, 14-A, 21-A, and 22-A. It was built to be used as a rostrum. The gazebo was removed in 1952, leaving only a concrete base and floor.

In 1934, a combination brick and concrete utility building with comfort station, 33 feet 4 inches (10.16 m) by 22 feet 3 inches (6.78 m), was constructed to the rear and south of the lodge. The roof is asphalt.

A brick and concrete gasoline storage building, 8 feet 5 inches (2.57 m) by 8 feet (2.4 m), with an asphalt roof, was constructed in 1936 between the utility building and the northwest perimeter wall.

== Capacity ==
Richmond National Cemetery is closed to new interments. The only interments that are being accepted are subsequent interments for veterans or eligible family members in an existing gravesite. Periodically however, burial space may become available due to a canceled reservation or when a disinterment has been completed. When either of these two scenarios occurs, the gravesite is made available to another eligible veteran on a first-come, first-served basis.
