= Hebrew Cemetery (Richmond, Virginia) =

Historic cemetery in Richmond, Virginia

- U.S. National Register of Historic Places
- U.S. Historic district
- Virginia Landmarks Register
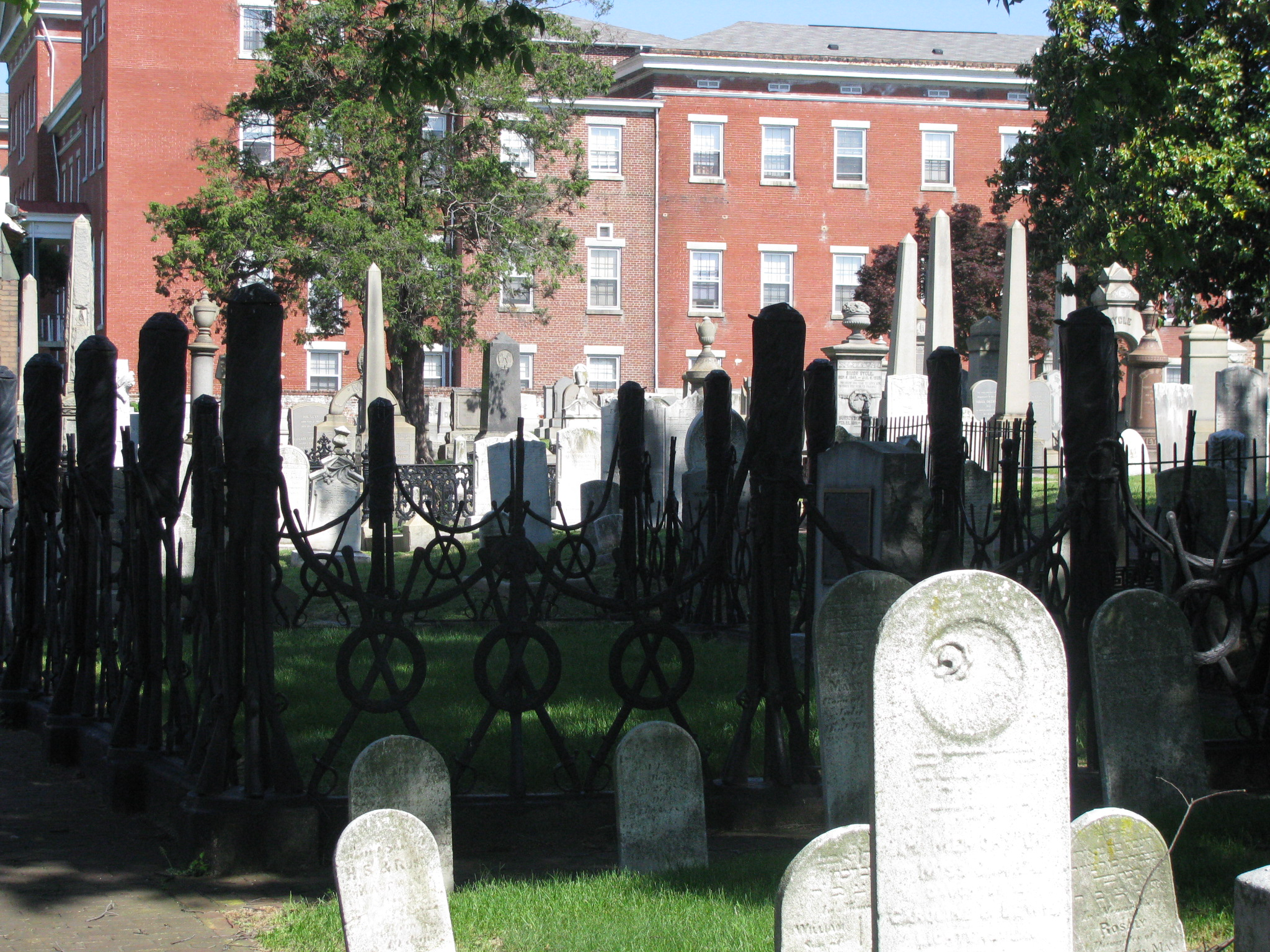

- Location within Virginia Location within the United States
- Location: 400 Hospital St., Richmond, Virginia
- Coordinates: 37°33′08″N 77°25′46″W
- Built: 1816
- Architect: Dimmock, James
- Architectural style: Romanesque
- NRHP reference No.: 06000348
- VLR No.: 127-6166

Significant dates
- Added to NRHP: May 5, 2006
- Designated VLR: March 8, 2006

The Hebrew Cemetery in Richmond, Virginia, also known as Hebrew Burying Ground, and previously the Jew's Burying Ground, dates from 1816. This Jewish cemetery, one of the oldest in the United States, was founded in 1816 as successor to the Franklin Street Burial Grounds of 1789. Among those interred here is Josephine Cohen Joel, who was well known in the early 20th century as the founder of Richmond Art Co. Within Hebrew Cemetery is a plot known as the Soldier's Section. It contains the graves of 30 Jewish Confederate soldiers who died in or near Richmond. It is one of only two Jewish military cemeteries outside of the State of Israel.

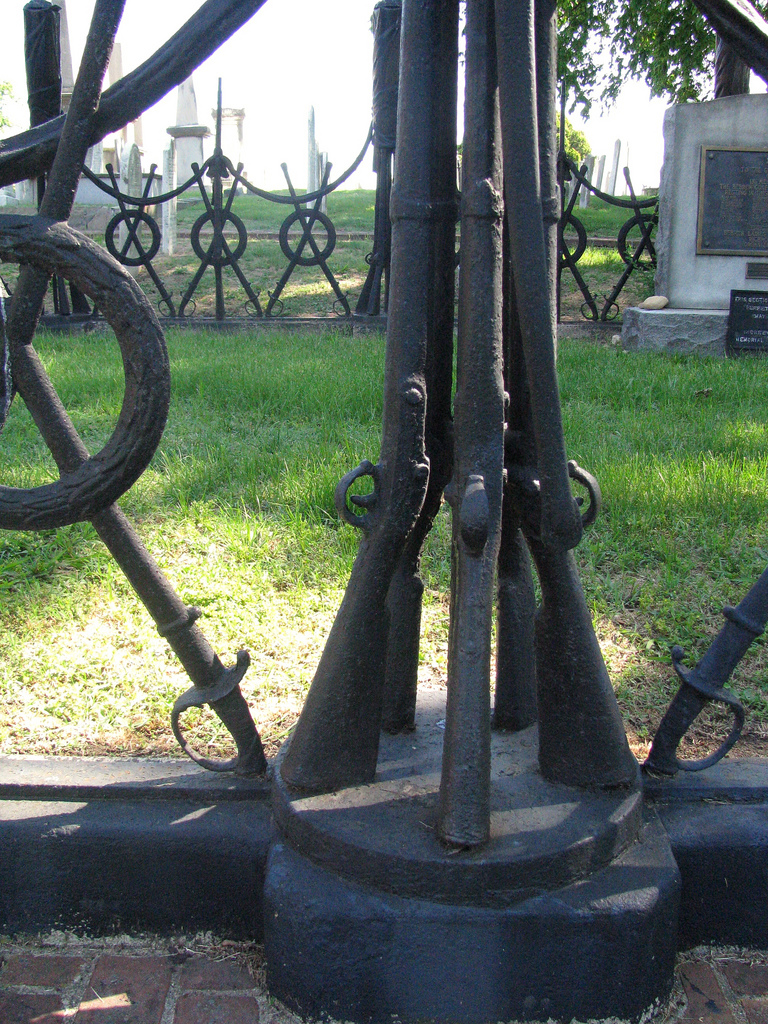
Detail of cast iron fencing

Located at Fourth and Hospital Streets on historic Shockoe Hill, it was listed on the National Register of Historic Places in 2006. It was listed a second time on the National Register of Historic Places on June 16, 2022 as part of the Shockoe Hill Burying Ground Historic District.

The Hebrew Cemetery is maintained by Congregation Beth Ahabah, a Reform congregation founded in Richmond in 1789.

== Cemetery for Hebrew Confederate Soldiers ==
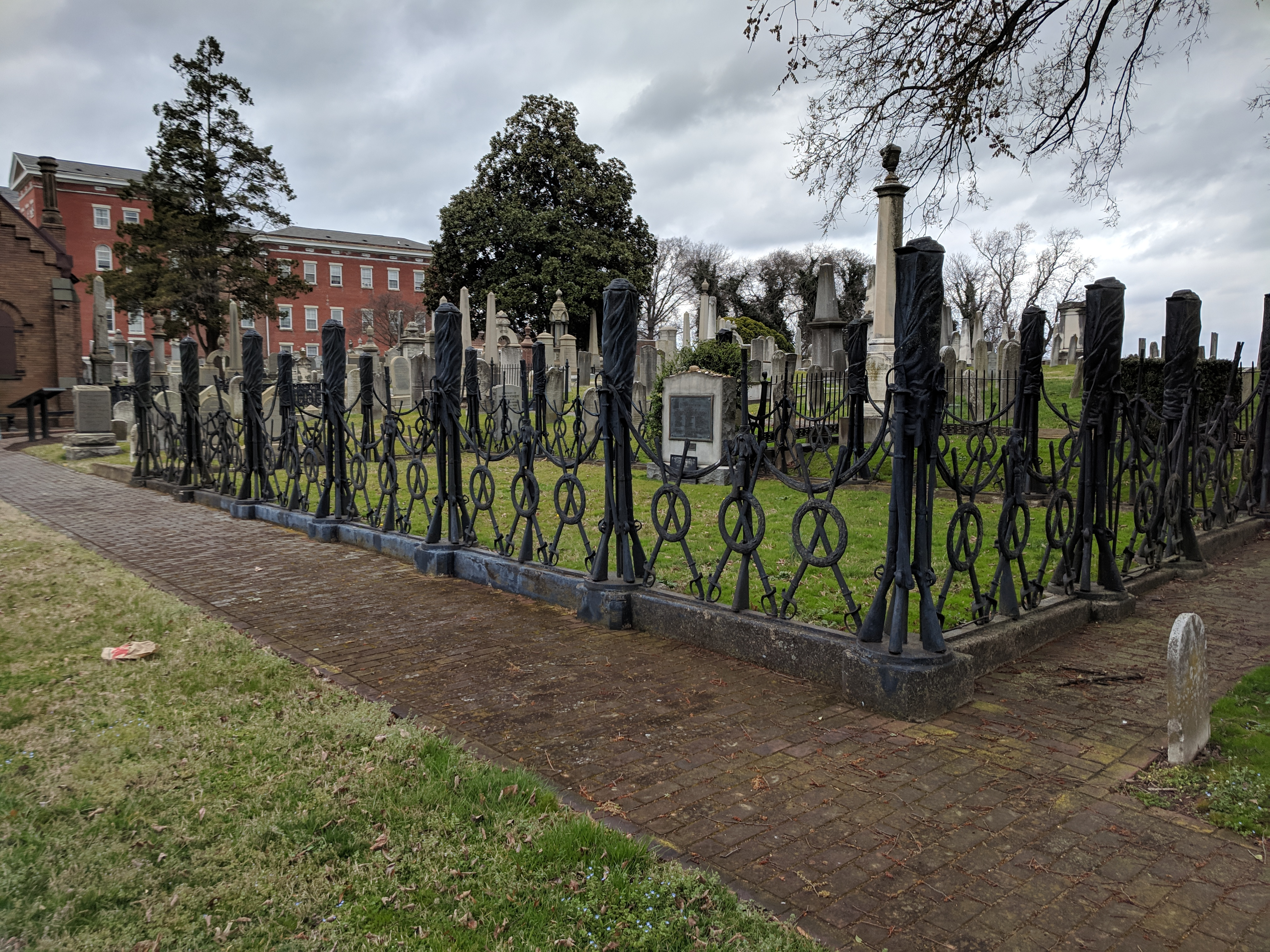
Cemetery for Hebrew Confederate Soldiers, March 2019

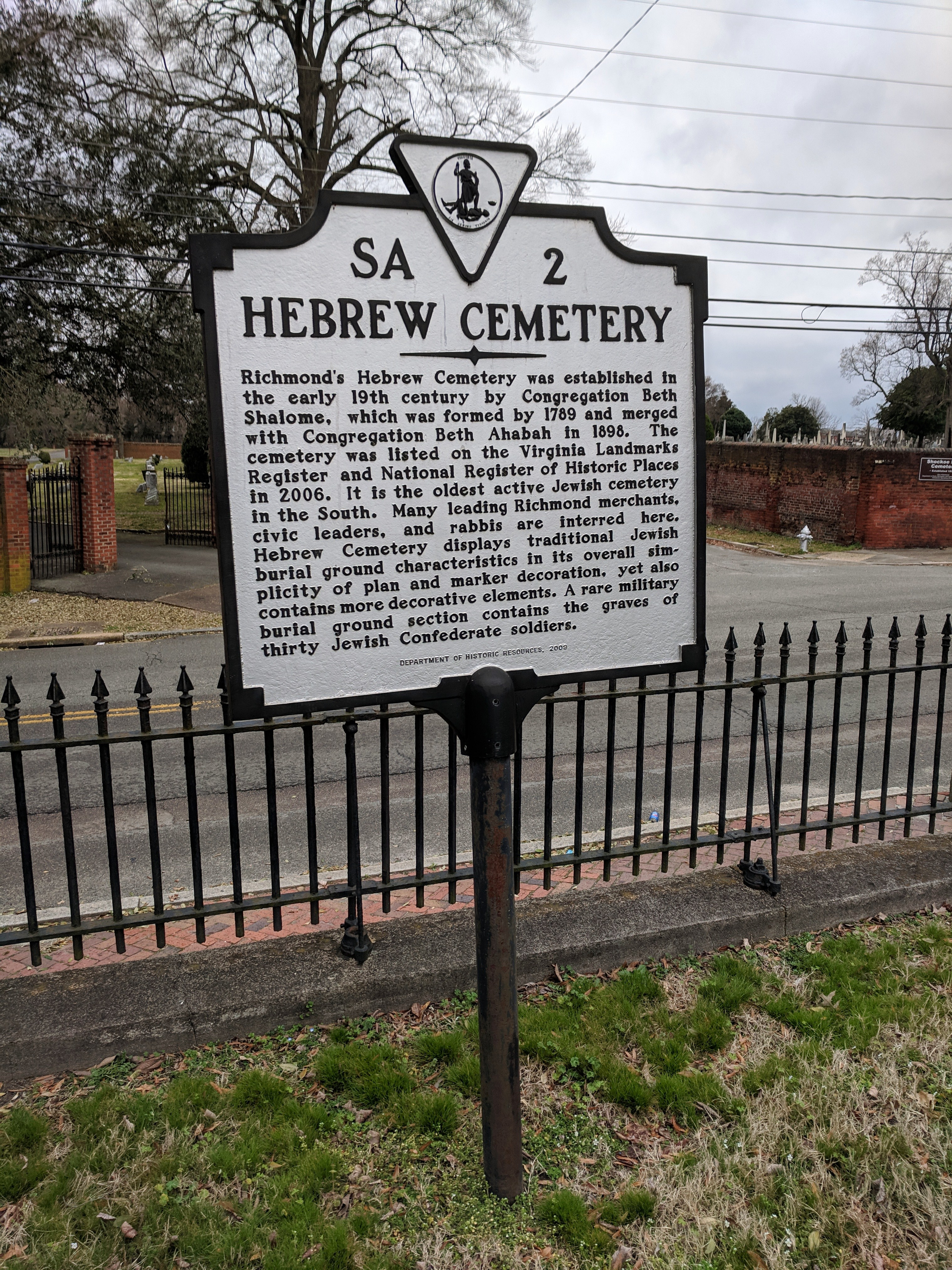
Historical marker

Within the Hebrew Cemetery is a section for Hebrew Confederate Soldiers. The cemetery for Jewish veterans of World War I located in Weissensee, Berlin, is the only Jewish military cemetery not located in Israel. The Confederate section is part of the Hebrew Cemetery on historic Shockoe Hill, and is also maintained by Congregation Beth Ahabah.
