= Shockoe Hill African Burying Ground =

Historic African American cemetery in Richmond, Virginia

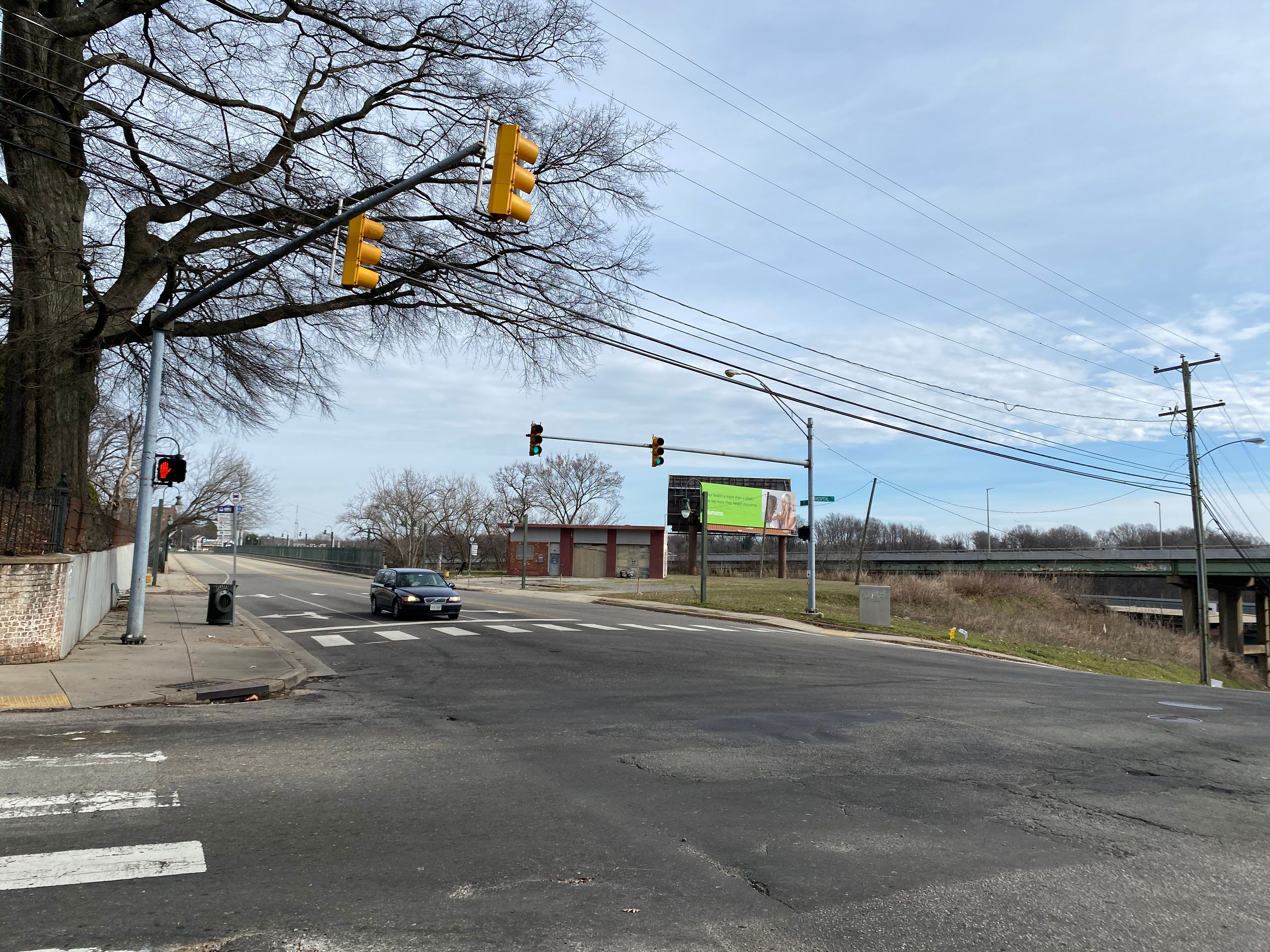

Details
- Established: 1816
- Location: Richmond, Virginia
- Country: United States
- Coordinates: 37°33′06.5″N 77°25′42.2″W
- Type: Public
- Owned by: City of Richmond (owns 1305 N 5th St., a 1.2 acre parcel of the 31 acre burial ground. The rest of the burial ground is divided between over a dozen owners.)
- Find a Grave: Shockoe Hill African Burying Ground

The Shockoe Hill African Burying Ground (Richmond's 2nd African Burial Ground) was established by the city of Richmond, Virginia, for the interment of free people of color, and the enslaved. The heart of this now invisible burying ground is located at 1305 N 5th St.

It was created as the replacement for the Burial Ground for Negroes, now also called the Shockoe Bottom African Burial Ground, (or African Burial Ground in Shockoe Bottom). Shockoe Bottom was known historically as Shockoe Valley. The Burial Ground for Negroes was closed in 1816 upon the opening of this new African Burying Ground on Shockoe Hill. The Shockoe Hill African Burying Ground is one of Virginia's most endangered historic places. Major threats to the burial ground are the DC2RVA high-speed rail project, the east-west Commonwealth Corridor, the proposed RVA757 Connector, as well as the widening of I-64, and various infrastructure projects.

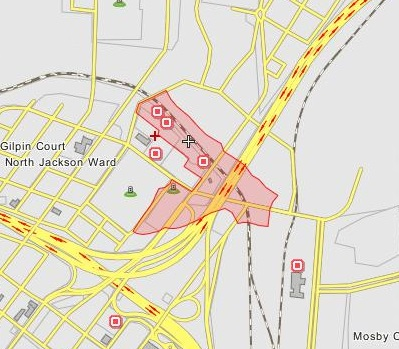
The red outline and shading represents the boundaries and footprint of the Shockoe Hill African Burying Ground.

== History ==
=== Establishment ===
The Shockoe Hill African Burying Ground was established in 1816. It was a segregated part of the Shockoe Hill Burying Ground, also known as the Shockoe Hill Cemetery, a municipal burying ground owned and operated by the City of Richmond. It was managed by the Superintendent of the Shockoe Hill Burying Ground, who was also the Superintendent of the Poorhouse (with the exception of the years 1863-1867 during which time the positions were separated) and the City Hospital The Poorhouse was also called the Almshouse. The burial ground was overseen by the Shockoe Hill Burying Ground Committee, which was a standing committee of the Richmond City Council. The African Burying Ground was active from its opening in February 1816 until its closure by the city due to overcrowded conditions in June 1879. The land that comprises this long unacknowledged burial ground, contains nothing on its surface that would cause it to be visibly recognizable as a cemetery today. Its original two one acre plots are located at the northeastern corner of 5th and Hospital St., across the road from the Hebrew Cemetery. It was greatly increased in size over time, expanding in every direction. By 1850 its grounds encompassed as many as 15 acres. Later maps indicate an even greater expansion, to slightly over 31 acres.

=== Maps ===
In the 1870s it came to be labeled on maps as Potter's Field, until it last appeared in 1905. The 1905 map showed that it extended west behind The Almshouse to 2nd St, and north to the Bacon's Quarter Branch. Some maps show it extending to the east almost as far as 8th St. Earlier maps show it by various names. On the 1816 Plan of the City of Richmond Property, the two one-acre plots were labeled "Burying Ground for Free People of Colour", and the "Burying Ground for Negroes". On the 1817 Map of the City of Richmond, it appears as the "Free People of Colour's B.G." and "Negro(e's) B.G.". The 1835 Plan of the City of Richmond has it recorded as the "Grave Yard for Free People of Colour" and "For Slaves". On that map the burying ground for slaves had been increased by about 1.3 additional acres. The 1842 Bates Map depicts it as "The Burying Ground for Coloured Persons" and "the Burying Ground for Slaves". On the 1849 Plan of Richmond, it is referred to as one place, and was called the "Burying-ground for Coloured Persons". In 1850 the Common Council increased the burying-ground for colored persons by 9 acres in addition to the grounds of the City Hospital. On the 1853 Smith's Map of Henrico County, Virginia, it appears twice. On the county portion of the map it appears under the "Shockoe Hill Burying Ground". On the separate city of Richmond portion of the map it appears as the "African Burying Ground". On the 1856 Map of the city of Richmond, Henrico County, the entire burying ground (black and white) appears under one name, without the additional labels showing its segregated status. Though still segregated, it appears simply as the "Shockoe Hill Burying Ground". This is also the name under which it appears in the majority of records, such as interment reports. It is also true for some maps from the 1860s. However; it is from the combination of the two names under which it appears on the 1853 Map that the name "Shockoe Hill African Burying Ground" was derived.

=== City Hospital grounds ===
During the Civil War, the bodies of more than 500 deceased Union Army Prisoners of War were interred in the Shockoe Hill African Burying Ground. Shortly after the war their remains were removed from the African Burying Ground and then re-interred in the Richmond National Cemetery. The majority of the soldiers had been buried to the north, and to the east of the City Hospital (for smallpox). Interments were also made in the vicinity of the Poorhouse. It was reported that 428 soldiers were removed from the City Hospital, and 128 from the vicinity of the Poorhouse. The City Hospital building was converted into the Colored Almshouse, which then opened its doors in April 1868. The City Hospital was included on the 1842 Bates Map, and may have been constructed about that time. It was located directly to the east of the walled Shockoe Hill Cemetery. Its grounds were added to the African Burying Ground by the City Council in 1850. The 1816 plan of the city property shows that the northern grounds of the hospital were already in use for the interment of paupers who had died at the Poorhouse, both black and white. This early part of the burial ground extended across present day N 4th St.

=== Desecrations and threats ===
The burying ground has suffered several desecrations. Throughout its years of active operation, it was a main target for body snatching by and for the medical colleges, especially the Medical College of Virginia and the University of Virginia. It suffered from the explosion of a gunpowder magazine on April 3, 1865, and the later construction of two new powder magazines in 1867. As a cemetery, it was abandoned by the city and visually erased from the landscape. All of its grave markers were removed. It was rendered unrecognizable, removed from maps, and almost completely forgotten. Its grounds were divided up, most were sold and others gifted to new owners. In addition, it has had roads, a railway, and the highway run through it grounds. An old Sunoco gas station sits upon a portion of its original 2 acres, along with a billboard; while other parts lie beneath Interstate 64, 4th St., 5th St., 7th St. Hospital St. and also the railroad tracks. Three approaching threats to the burial ground are DC2RVA passenger rail (high-speed rail), the east-west Commonwealth Corridor, and the proposed widening of I-64. The most recently known appears to be the installation of underground cables which were run through the burial ground in the area of Hospital St. and 7th St. in early 2022. Plans proposed in 2024 for additional infrastructure work at the intersection of N 7th St., and Hospital St. by the city, if carried out as planned will also harm the burial ground.

One of the newer threats to the Shockoe Hill African Burying Ground is mis-identification and confusion. In the fall of 2022 the Shockoe Hill African Burying Ground was confused in the media with the Shockoe Bottom African Burial Ground, though the distance between them is more than a mile. It was reported multiple times that the Shockoe Hill African Burying Ground was the burial ground located next to Lumpkin's Jail. Historically, it is the Shockoe Hill African Burying Ground, that was the active municipal burial ground for the city of Richmond for African-Americans during the time that Lumpkin's Jail was in operation. But physically, it is the older African Burial Ground in Shockoe Bottom (which was closed in 1816) that is located next to Lumpkin's Slave Jail.

=== Estimations ===
Reports of interments were regularly made and submitted to the Richmond City Council by the Superintendent of the Shockoe Hill Burying Ground. It is estimated that over 22,000 interments were made in the Shockoe Hill African Burying Ground, likely making it the largest burial ground of free people of color and the enslaved in the United States. It is presently referred to by some as the 2nd African Burial Ground or second African Burying Ground.

=== Developments ===
Recent advocacy led by Lenora McQueen, a descendant of people interred at the Shockoe Hill African Burying Ground, resulted in gaining the support of the city of Richmond. In 2020, Mayor Levar Stoney and his administration sponsored two important ordinances regarding the burial ground. Ordinance #2020-213 added the property at 1305 N 5th St. to the Richmond Slave Trail, and provided for the funding of its intended acquisition. Ordinance #2020-240 paved the way for the purchase of the property. Both ordinances were presented before the Richmond City Council who passed them with unanimous support. Though 1305 N. 5th St. is only a small portion of the Shockoe Hill African Burying Ground, it is a significant part. It is 1.2 acres of the original 2 acre 1816 burial ground. More specifically, it is roughly 0.80 acres of the "Burying Ground for Free People of Colour", and about 0.40 acres of the "Burying Ground for Negroes" (enslaved). On February 17, 2021, the city of Richmond successfully bid on 1305 N. 5th St. at a property tax sale. On April 16, 2021, the acquisition of 1305 N. 5th St. was completed.

On May 11, 2021, Preservation Virginia, named the Shockoe Hill African Burying Ground, one of Virginia's Most Endangered Historic Places.
