= The Almshouse (Richmond, Virginia) =

Historic buildings in Virginia, US

- U.S. National Register of Historic Places
- Virginia Landmarks Register
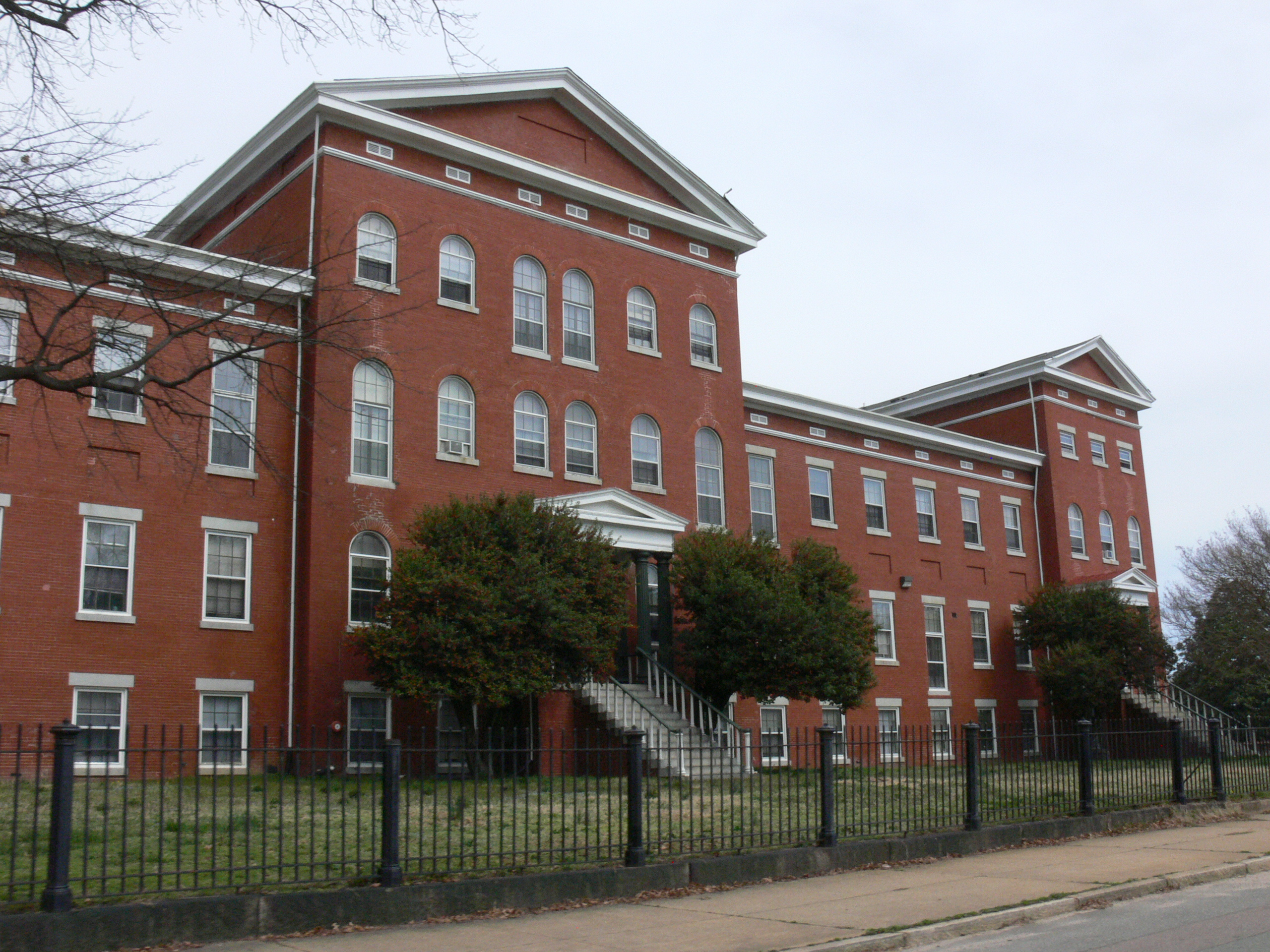
- The Almshouse, March 2011

- Location within Virginia Location within the United States
- Location: 210 Hospital St., Richmond, Virginia
- Coordinates: 37°33′11″N 77°25′50″W
- Area: 7.5 acres (3.0 ha)
- Built: 1860-1861, 1908
- Architect: Gill, Washington Jr.
- Architectural style: Italianate
- NRHP reference No.: 81000647, 89001913 (Boundary Increase)
- VLR No.: 127-0353

Significant dates
- Added to NRHP: October 29, 1981, June 13, 1990 (Boundary Increase)
- Designated VLR: July 21, 1981, August 15, 1989

The Almshouse, also known as the City Home, is a historic almshouse and hospital complex located in Richmond, Virginia.

== History ==
=== The Almshouse ===
The Richmond Almshouse and hospital complex includes the Main Building, a one-story administration building built c. 1950, the West Building, and the Garage. The Main Almshouse Building was built in 1860–61, and is an Italianate style brick building consisting of three symmetrically spaced pavilions linked by hyphens. Each pavilion is three stories tall, three bays wide, and rises above a raised full-story basement. The West Building was built in 1908. Its basic design is very similar to the 1860-61 Almshouse, except that each pavilion is two stories tall.

=== The Colored Almshouse ===
The West Building was built to be the new Colored Almshouse, also known as the new Colored Home. It replaced the old "Colored Almshouse" and hospital which was opened in 1868. It was located on what is now the grounds of the Hebrew Cemetery Annex. Those same grounds were the former location of the City Hospital for smallpox, along with a portion of the Shockoe Hill African Burying Ground. The new Colored Almshouse also housed a charity hospital for African-American residents of Richmond. The garage is a two-story masonry and wood frame two bay building. The Almshouse, later called the Richmond Nursing Home, continued to serve the less-fortunate members of the Richmond community until the late 1970s. It is now in use again as a privately managed home for low-income residents.

=== General Hospital #1 ===
From 1861 to 1864, the Almshouse served as a Confederate States hospital, officially designated General Hospital No. 1 but also widely known as the Alms House Hospital. It operated under the direction of Dr. Charles Bell Gibson, the head of surgical department at the Medical College of Virginia. Many casualties from the battles of First and Second Manassas, Ball's Bluff, the Seven Days, Fredericksburg, and Chancellorsville were treated here. For much of that time, Union sick and wounded were treated in the building as well. In 1864, the building transitioned briefly to use as an officers-only facility until closing as a hospital in mid-1864. In December 1864, it became the home of the Virginia Military Institute, after that campus had been burned by Union troops under the command of Gen. David Hunter. The institute and its cadets occupied the building until the fall of Richmond to Union forces in April 1865.

=== Temporary and former Almshouse ===
While the new 1861 Almshouse was under construction and also during the Civil War, a temporary Almshouse was operated on the property of John W. Smith, the former keeper of the Gun Powder Magazine. The new Almshouse was the replacement for the former Almshouse also called the Poor-house and the Poor and Work House which was located at the same place. Its construction was completed in 1806. It was once the third largest building in the city of Richmond.

The 1861 Almshouse was listed on the National Register of Historic Places in 1981, with a boundary increase in 1990.
