= List of cemeteries in the United States =

Cemeteries in the United States listed here include both active and historic sites. Pet cemeteries are not included. There is a separate section for cemeteries in territories of the United States. Only notable cemeteries are listed.

== Alabama ==
- List of historic cemeteries in Alabama, from the Alabama Historic Cemetery Register

== Arizona ==
- Boothill Graveyard, Tombstone
- Citizens Cemetery, Flagstaff (site of mass grave of victims of 1956 Grand Canyon mid-air collision)
- City of Mesa Cemetery, Mesa
- Double Butte Cemetery, Tempe
- Glendale Memorial Park Cemetery, Glendale
- Grand Canyon Pioneer Cemetery
- Greenwood/Memory Lawn Mortuary & Cemetery, Phoenix
- Hardyville Pioneer Cemetery, Bullhead City
- National Memorial Cemetery of Arizona, Phoenix
- Pioneer and Military Memorial Park, Phoenix
- Prescott National Cemetery, Prescott
- St. Francis Catholic Cemetery, Phoenix
- Twin Buttes Cemetery, Twin Buttes (ghost town)

== Colorado ==
- Church of the Brethren, Hygiene, Colorado
- Fairmount Cemetery, Denver
- Fairmount Mausoleum, Denver
- Fairview Cemetery, Colorado Springs
- Fort Logan National Cemetery, Denver
- Fort Lyon National Cemetery, Las Animas
- Grandview Cemetery, Fort Collins
- Mount Olivet Cemetery, Wheat Ridge
- Pikes Peak National Cemetery, Colorado Springs
- Riverside Cemetery, Denver
- Silver Cliff Cemetery
- Tower of Memories, Wheat Ridge
- United States Air Force Academy Cemetery, Colorado Springs

=== Listed on the National Register of Historic Places in Colorado ===
- Evergreen Cemetery, Colorado Springs
- Riverside Cemetery, Denver
- Tower of Memories
- Ute Cemetery

== Connecticut ==
- Abbey of Regina Laudis Cemetery, Bethlehem
- Cedar Hill Cemetery, Hartford
- Evergreen Cemetery, New Haven
- Mountain Grove Cemetery, Bridgeport

== Delaware ==
- Immanuel Episcopal Church on the Green
- Newark Union Church and Cemetery

== District of Columbia ==
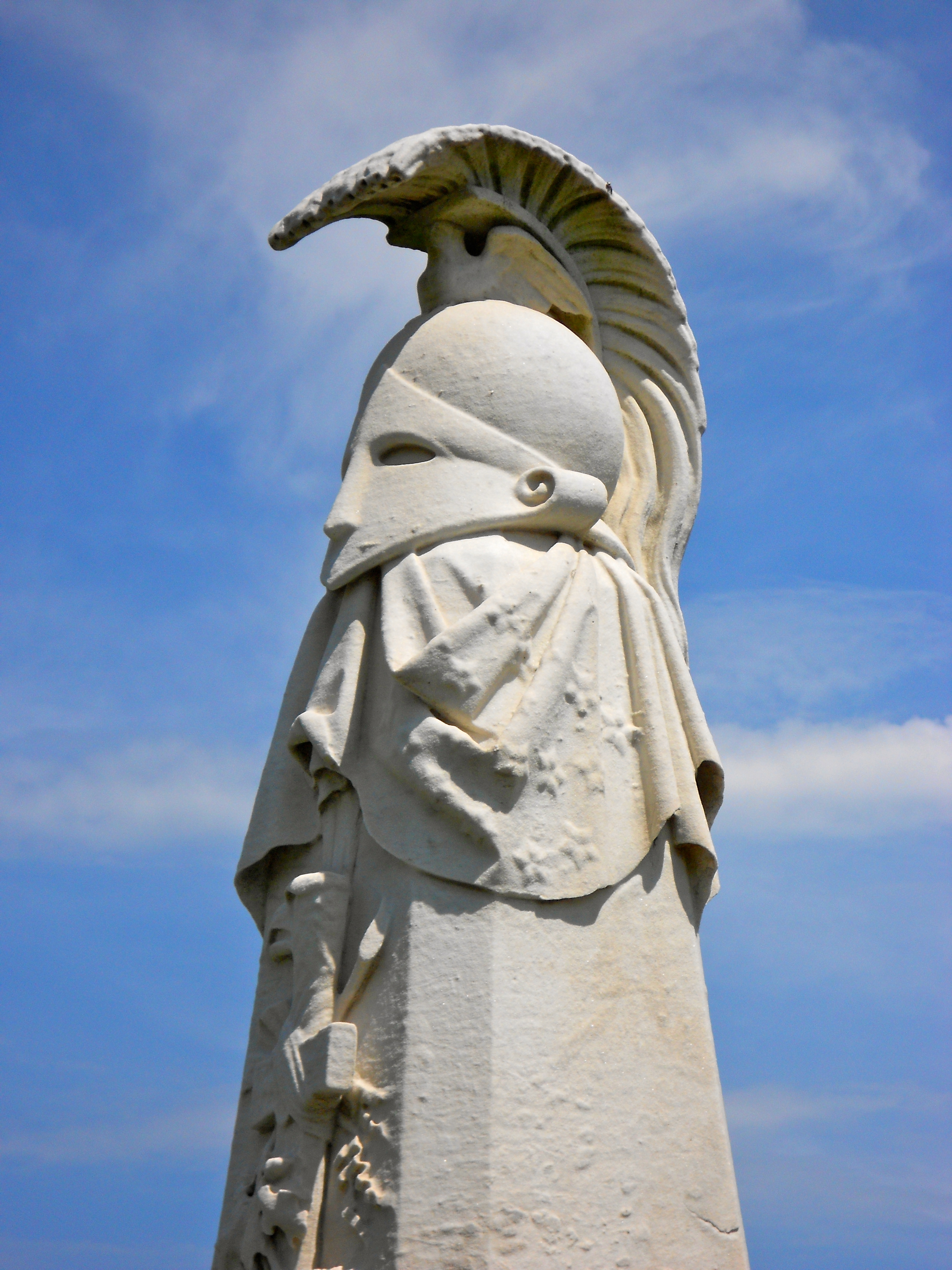
Alexander Macomb's grave at the Congressional Cemetery

- Battleground National Cemetery
- Congressional Cemetery
- Glenwood Cemetery
- Holy Rood Cemetery
- Jesuit Community Cemetery (on the campus of Georgetown University)
- Mount Olivet Cemetery
- Oak Hill Cemetery
- Prospect Hill Cemetery
- Rock Creek Cemetery
- United States Soldiers' and Airmen's Home National Cemetery
- Washington National Cathedral
- Woodlawn Cemetery

== Florida ==
- Caballero Rivero Woodlawn Park North Cemetery and Mausoleum, Miami
- Florida National Cemetery
- South Florida National Cemetery
- Woodlawn Cemetery (West Palm Beach, Florida)

== Georgia ==
- Bonaventure Cemetery, Savannah
- Greenwood Cemetery, Atlanta
- Rose Hill Cemetery, Macon
- South-View Cemetery, Atlanta
- Mordecai Sheftall Cemetery, Savannah
- Levi Sheftall Family Cemetery, Savannah
- Westview Cemetery, Atlanta

== Illinois ==
- All Saints Cemetery, Des Plaines
- Bachelor's Grove Cemetery, Chicago
- Burr Oak Cemetery, Alsip
- Chippiannock Cemetery, Rock Island (listed on the cemetery National Registry in 1994)
- Evergreen Cemetery, Bloomington
- German Waldheim Cemetery, Forest Park, Illinois
- Graceland Cemetery, Chicago
- Holy Sepulchre Cemetery, Worth
- Homewood Memorial Gardens, Homewood
- Lake Forest Cemetery, Lake Forest
- Lincoln Cemetery, Blue Island
- Montrose Cemetery, Chicago
- Mount Carmel Cemetery, Hillside
- Oak Ridge Cemetery, Springfield
- Oak Woods Cemetery, Chicago
- Queen of Heaven Cemetery, Hillside
- Ramsey Cemetery
- Restvale Cemetery, Alsip
- Riverside Cemetery, Moline
- Rock Island National Cemetery
- Rosehill Cemetery, Chicago
- St. Adalbert Cemetery, Niles
- Westlawn Cemetery, Chicago
- Showmen's Rest (circus performers)

== Indiana ==
- Crown Hill Cemetery, Indianapolis
- Greenlawn Cemetery, Indianapolis
- Heady Lane Cemetery, Fishers
- Lindenwood Cemetery, Fort Wayne
- Noggle Cemetery, Cass Township, Pulaski County
- Pleasant Valley Cemetery, Parke County
- Beech Grove Cemetery, Muncie

== Kentucky ==
- Camp Nelson National Cemetery, Jessamine County
- Cave Hill Cemetery, Louisville
- Danville National Cemetery, Danville
- Frankfort Cemetery, Frankfort
- Lebanon National Cemetery, Lebanon
- Lexington Cemetery, Lexington
- Mill Springs National Cemetery, Nancy
- St. Louis Cemetery, Louisville
- Zachary Taylor National Cemetery, Louisville

== Louisiana ==
- Chalmette National Cemetery, Chalmette
- Girod Street Cemetery (defunct)
- Greenwood Cemetery, New Orleans
- Holt Cemetery, New Orleans
- Locust Grove State Historic Site, St. Francisville
- Metairie Cemetery, New Orleans
- Minden Cemetery, Minden
- Port Hudson National Cemetery
- Saint Louis Cemetery, New Orleans

== Massachusetts ==
- Edson Cemetery, Lowell
- Granary Burying Ground, Boston (17th century)
- Oak Grove Cemetery, Fall River
- Pine Grove Cemetery, Lynn
- Sleepy Hollow Cemetery, Concord

== Missouri ==
- Alexander Cemetery, Carterville
- Bellefontaine Cemetery, St. Louis
- Bollinger County Memorial Park Cemetery, Marble Hill
- Calvary Cemetery, St. Louis
- Cold Water Cemetery, Florissant, St. Louis County
- Columbia Cemetery, Columbia
- Eddie Cemetery, St. Louis County
- Elmwood Cemetery, Kansas City, Missouri
- Father Dickson Cemetery, Crestwood, St. Louis County
- Forest Hill Calvary Cemetery, Kansas City, Missouri
- Grand View Burial Park, Hannibal
- Greenwood Cemetery, Hillsdale, Missouri
- Jewell Cemetery State Historic Site, Columbia
- Mount Zion Cemetery, Boone County
- Quinette Cemetery, Kirkwood, St. Louis County
- Union Cemetery, Kansas City, Missouri
- Washington Park Cemetery, Berkeley, St. Louis County

== Nebraska ==
- Forest Lawn Memorial Park, Omaha
- Fort McPherson National Cemetery
- St. John's Evangelical Lutheran German Church and Cemetery
- Wyuka Cemetery, Lincoln

== Nevada ==
- Austin Cemetery
- Goodsprings Cemetery
- St. Thomas Memorial Cemetery
- Woodlawn Cemetery, Las Vegas

== New Jersey ==
- Cedar Lawn Cemetery, Paterson
- Fairview Cemetery, Westfield
- Floral Park Cemetery, South Brunswick
- Gate of Heaven Cemetery
- Harleigh Cemetery, Camden
- Hillside Cemetery
- Mt. Pleasant Cemetery, Newark
- Princeton Cemetery, Princeton
- Riverview Cemetery, Trenton

== New Mexico ==
- Fort Bayard National Cemetery
- Santa Fe National Cemetery

== New York ==
- Baron Hirsch Cemetery, Staten Island
- Bayside Cemetery, Ozone Park, Queens
- Beth David Cemetery, Elmont, Long Island
- Calvary Cemetery (Queens), Woodside, New York
- Cypress Hills Cemetery, Brooklyn and Queens
- Ferncliff Cemetery, Hartsdale
- Forest Hill Cemetery, Utica
- Forest Lawn Cemetery, Buffalo
- Gate of Heaven Cemetery, Hawthorne
- Green-Wood Cemetery, Brooklyn
- Hartsdale Pet Cemetery and Crematory, Hartsdale – National Register of Historic Places since 2012
- Kensico Cemetery, Valhalla
- Locust Valley Cemetery, Locust Valley, New York
- Machpelah Cemetery, Glendale, Queens
- Montefiore Cemetery, Springfield Gardens, Queens
- Mount Lebanon Cemetery, Glendale, Queens
- Mount Hebron Cemetery, Flushing, Queens
- Mount Hope Cemetery, Rochester
- Mount Zion Cemetery (Elmweir), Maspeth, Queens
- New Montefiore Cemetery, West Babylon, New York
- Saint Charles Cemetery, East Farmingdale
- Salem Fields Cemetery, Cypress Hills, Brooklyn
- Sleepy Hollow Cemetery, Sleepy Hollow
- Trinity Church Cemetery, Manhattan
- Washington Cemetery, Mapleton, Brooklyn
- Westchester Hills Cemetery, Hastings-on-Hudson
- White Plains Rural Cemetery, White Plains
- Woodlawn Cemetery, The Bronx
- Woodlawn Cemetery, Elmira

== Pennsylvania ==
- Chester Rural Cemetery, Chester, Pennsylvania
- Christ Church Burial Ground, Philadelphia
- Eden Cemetery, Collingdale
- Greenwood Cemetery, Pittsburgh
- Ivy Hill Cemetery, Philadelphia
- Lebanon Cemetery, Philadelphia, Pennsylvania
- Monument Cemetery, Philadelphia
- Mount Moriah Cemetery, Philadelphia and Yeadon
- Mount Peace Cemetery, Philadelphia
- Mount Vernon Cemetery, Philadelphia
- Oaklands Cemetery, West Chester
- Wildwood Cemetery (Pennsylvania), Williamsport, Pennsylvania
- The Woodlands, Philadelphia

== Rhode Island ==
- Arnold Burying Ground, Newport
- Chestnut Hill Baptist Church and Cemetery, Exeter
- Common Burying Ground, Newport (adjacent to Island Cemetery), established in 1640
- DeWolf Cemetery, Bristol
- Island Cemetery, Newport (adjacent to Common Burying Ground)
- Little Neck Cemetery, East Providence
- Newport Memorial Park Cemetery, Middletown
- North Burial Ground, Providence, oldest cemetery in Providence
- Old Burying Ground, Little Compton
- Old Friends' Burial Ground, Jamestown
- Precious Blood Cemetery, Woonsocket
- Prince's Hill Cemetery, Barrington, Rhode Island
- Swan Point Cemetery, Providence
- Touro Cemetery, Newport – colonial era Jewish cemetery, subject of a famous poem by Henry Wadsworth Longfellow

== South Dakota ==
- Black Hills National Cemetery, Sturgis
- De Smet Cemetery, De Smet
- Fort Meade National Cemetery, Sturgis
- Hot Springs National Cemetery, Hot Springs
- Mount Moriah Cemetery, Deadwood
- Saint John Cemetery, Beresford

== Tennessee ==
- Chattanooga National Cemetery, Chattanooga
- Elmwood Cemetery, Memphis
- Forest Hill Cemetery, Memphis
- Graceland, Memphis
- Hendersonville Memory Gardens, Hendersonville
- Memorial Park Cemetery, Memphis
- Spring Hill Cemetery, Nashville
- Woodlawn Memorial Park, Nashville

== Texas ==
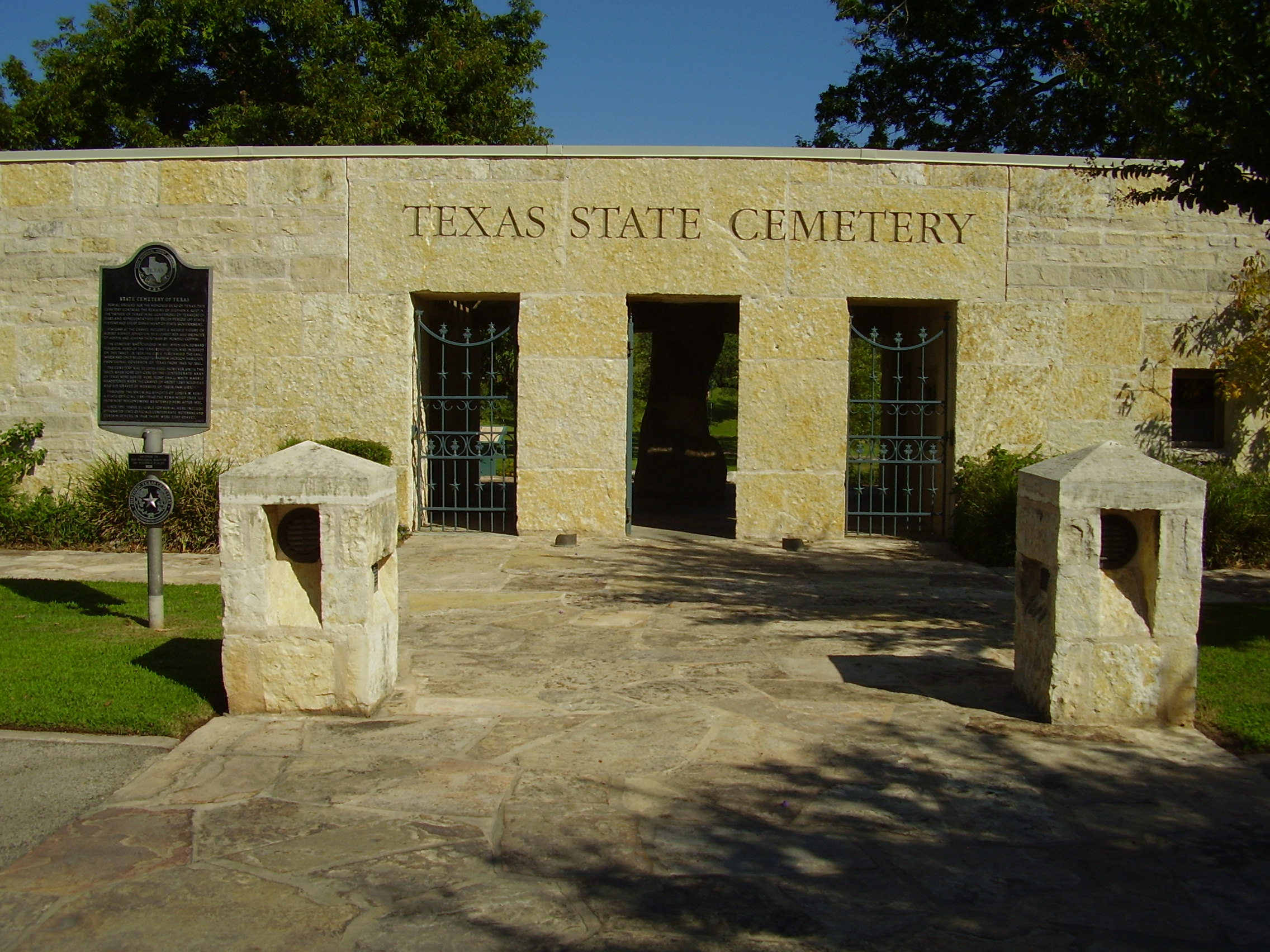
Texas State Cemetery, Austin

- Der Stadt Friedhof, Fredericksburg – pioneer cemetery
- Founders Memorial Cemetery, Houston – oldest cemetery in Houston
- Jackson Ranch Church Cemetery and Eli Jackson Cemetery, Hidalgo County, Texas
- Olivewood Cemetery, Houston – the city's earliest African-American cemetery, founded around 1870
- Texas State Cemetery, Austin
- Whittaker Memorial Cemetery, Kildare, Texas

== Vermont ==
- Laurel Glen Cemetery, Cuttingsville
- Lyndon Center Cemetery, Lyndon Center

== Virginia ==
- African Burial Ground, Richmond, Virginia (a.k.a. Shockoe Bottom African Burial Ground)
- Alexandria National Cemetery, Alexandria
- Arlington National Cemetery, Arlington
- Barton Heights Cemeteries, Richmond, Virginia
- Belmont Plantation, Loudoun County, Family and slave cemeteries
- Blandford Cemetery, Petersburg
- Columbia Gardens Cemetery, Arlington
- Dumfries Cemetery, Dumfries
- East End Cemetery, Richmond
- Evergreen Cemetery, Richmond
- Cemetery for Hebrew Confederate Soldiers, Richmond – the only Jewish military cemetery outside Israel
- Hollywood Cemetery, Richmond
- Oakwood Cemetery, Richmond, Virginia
- Richmond National Cemetery
- Mount Olivet United Methodist Church Cemetery, Arlington
- Shockoe Hill African Burying Ground, Richmond, Virginia
- Richmond's African Burial Grounds and Historic African American Cemeteries
- Woodland Cemetery, Richmond – historically African American cemetery

== Washington ==
- Calvary Cemetery, in the Ravenna/Bryant neighborhood of Seattle
- Comet Lodge Cemetery, Beacon Hill, Seattle – abandoned; founded 1895
- Evergreen Washelli Memorial Park, Seattle
- Grand Army of the Republic Cemetery, Seattle, adjacent to Lake View Cemetery
- Greenwood Memorial Park, Renton
- Lake View Cemetery, Seattle
- Tahoma National Cemetery, Kent

== West Virginia ==
- Greenbrier Memorial Gardens
- Spring Hill Cemetery (Historic District)
- West Virginia National Cemetery
- Mountain View Memorial Park

== Wisconsin ==
- Calvary Cemetery, Milwaukee
- Evergreen Cemetery, Menomonie
- Forest Home Cemetery, Milwaukee
- Forest Hill Cemetery, Madison
- Historic St. Ann's, Greenwood
- La Belle Cemetery, Oconomowoc
- La Pointe Indian Cemetery, La Pointe, Wisconsin
- Mound Cemetery (Racine, Wisconsin)
- Mount Olivet Cemetery, Janesville
- Mount Olivet Cemetery (Milwaukee), Milwaukee
- Peshtigo Fire Cemetery, Peshtigo
- Riverside Cemetery, Oshkosh
- Riverside Cemetery, Withee
- Rutland United Brethren, Rutland
- St. Augustine, Trenton
- St. Joseph of the Lake, Menominee Indian Reservation
- Stockbridge Indian Cemetery, Stockbridge
- Wood National Cemetery, Milwaukee

== Territories and former territories ==
=== Guam ===
- Guam Veterans Cemetery
- Sumay Cemetery, on the National Register of Historic Places listings in Guam
- Guam Windward Memorial
- U.S. Naval Cemetery

=== Puerto Rico ===
- Atlantic Gardens Veterans Cemetery
- Cementerio Católico San Vicente de Paul
- Cementerio Municipal de Mayaguez
- Old Urban Cemetery
- Panteón Nacional Román Baldorioty de Castro
- Puerto Rico National Cemetery
- Santa María Magdalena de Pazzis Cemetery

=== Republic of Palau ===
- Olekull Ra Ngersuul

== See also ==
- Boot Hill
- List of African American cemeteries
- List of Jewish cemeteries in the United States
- List of rural cemeteries in the United States
- United States National Cemetery System
