= List of cemeteries in Colorado =

This list of cemeteries in Colorado includes currently operating, historical (closed for new interments), and defunct (graves abandoned or removed) cemeteries, columbaria, and mausolea which are historical and/or notable. It does not include pet cemeteries.

== Bent County ==
- Fort Lyon National Cemetery, near Las Animas

== Boulder County ==
- St. Vrain Church of the Brethren, Hygiene; NRHP-listed

== Custer County ==
- Silver Cliff Cemetery, near Silver Cliff

== Denver County ==
- Fairmount Cemetery, Denver
- Fairmount Mausoleum, Denver
- Fort Logan National Cemetery, Denver
- Riverside Cemetery, Denver; NRHP-listed

== Douglas County ==
- Parker Cemetery, Parker

== El Paso County ==
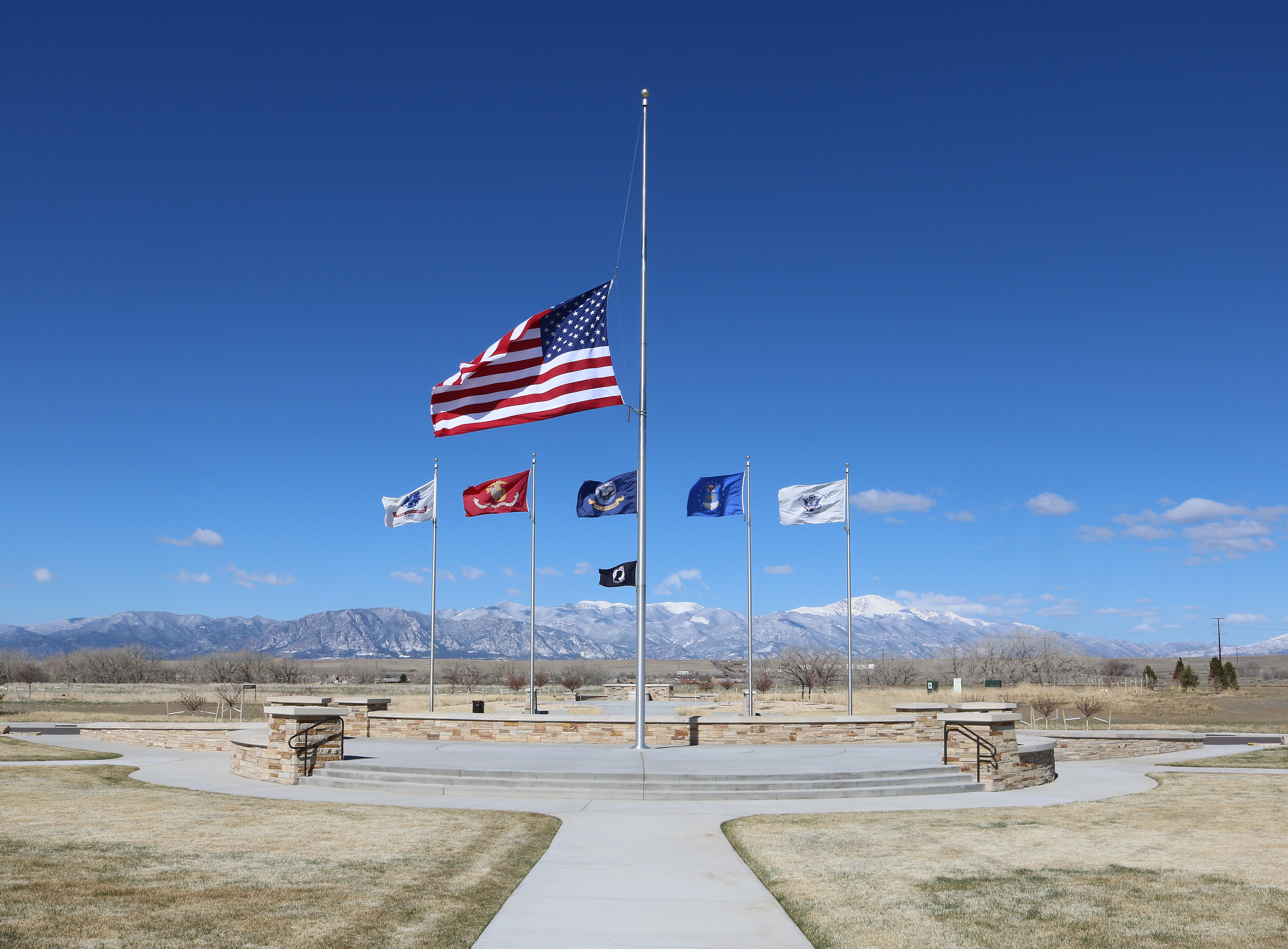
Pikes Peak National Cemetery in El Paso County

- Crystal Valley Cemetery, Manitou Springs; NRHP-listed
- Evergreen Cemetery, Colorado Springs
- Fairview Cemetery, Colorado Springs
- Pikes Peak National Cemetery, near Colorado Springs
- United States Air Force Academy Cemetery, Colorado Springs; NRHP-listed

== Jefferson County ==
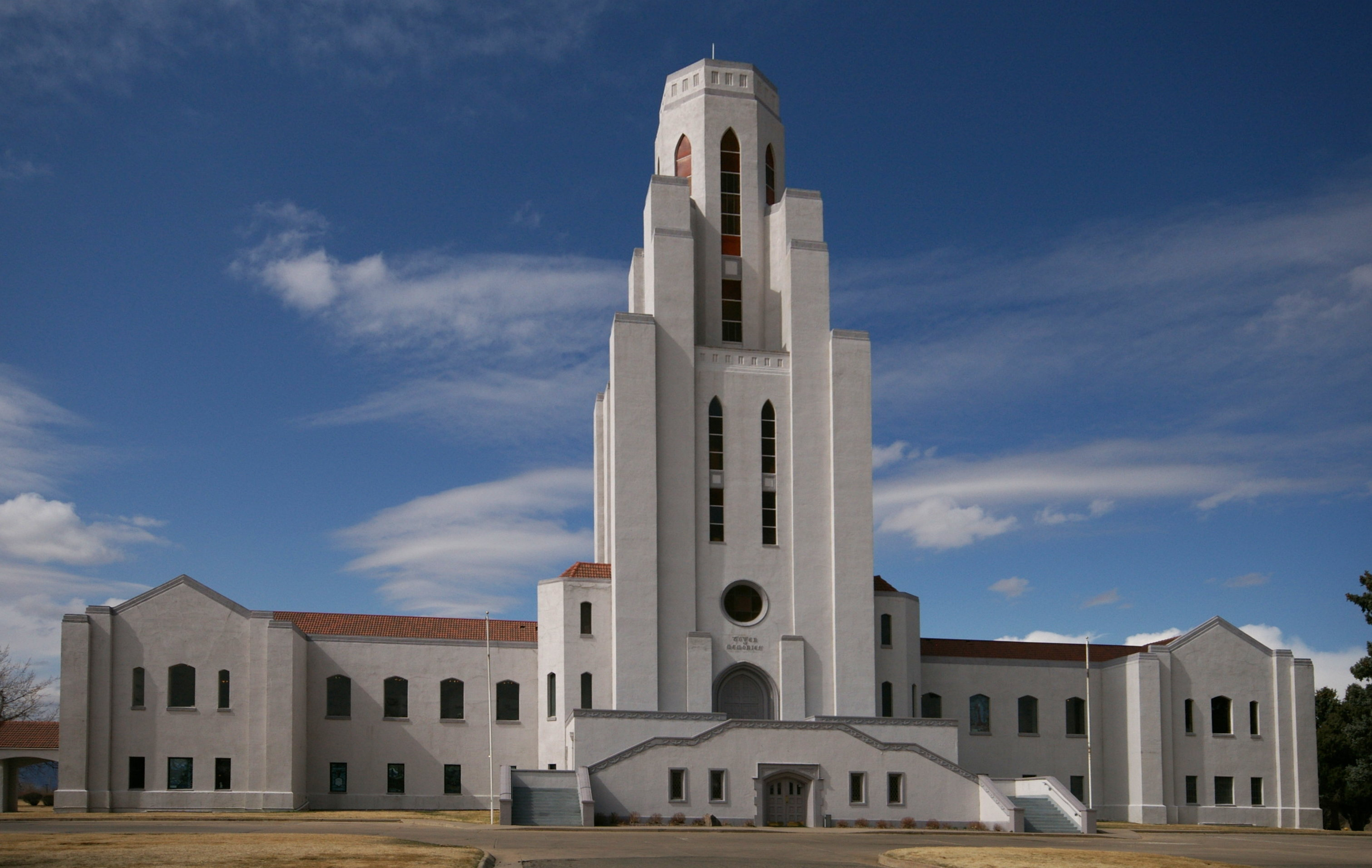
The Tower of Memories mausoleum, in the Crown Hill Cemetery, in Jefferson County

- Mount Olivet Cemetery, Wheat Ridge
- Tower of Memories mausoleum, Crown Hill Cemetery, Wheat Ridge; NRHP-listed

== Larimer County ==
- Grandview Cemetery, Fort Collins

== Las Animas County ==
- Our Lady of Guadalupe Church and Medina Cemetery, Medina Plaza; NRHP-listed

== Pitkin County ==
- Ute Cemetery, Aspen

== See also ==
- List of cemeteries in the United States
- Pioneer cemetery
