= Withee =

Withee may refer to:

- Mabel Withee (c. 1897 – 1952), American actress
- Niran Withee (1827–1887), American politician
- Withee, Wisconsin, a village, United States
- Withee (town), Wisconsin, a town, United States
