= Eaton, Clark County, Wisconsin =

Eaton, Wisconsin
- Town
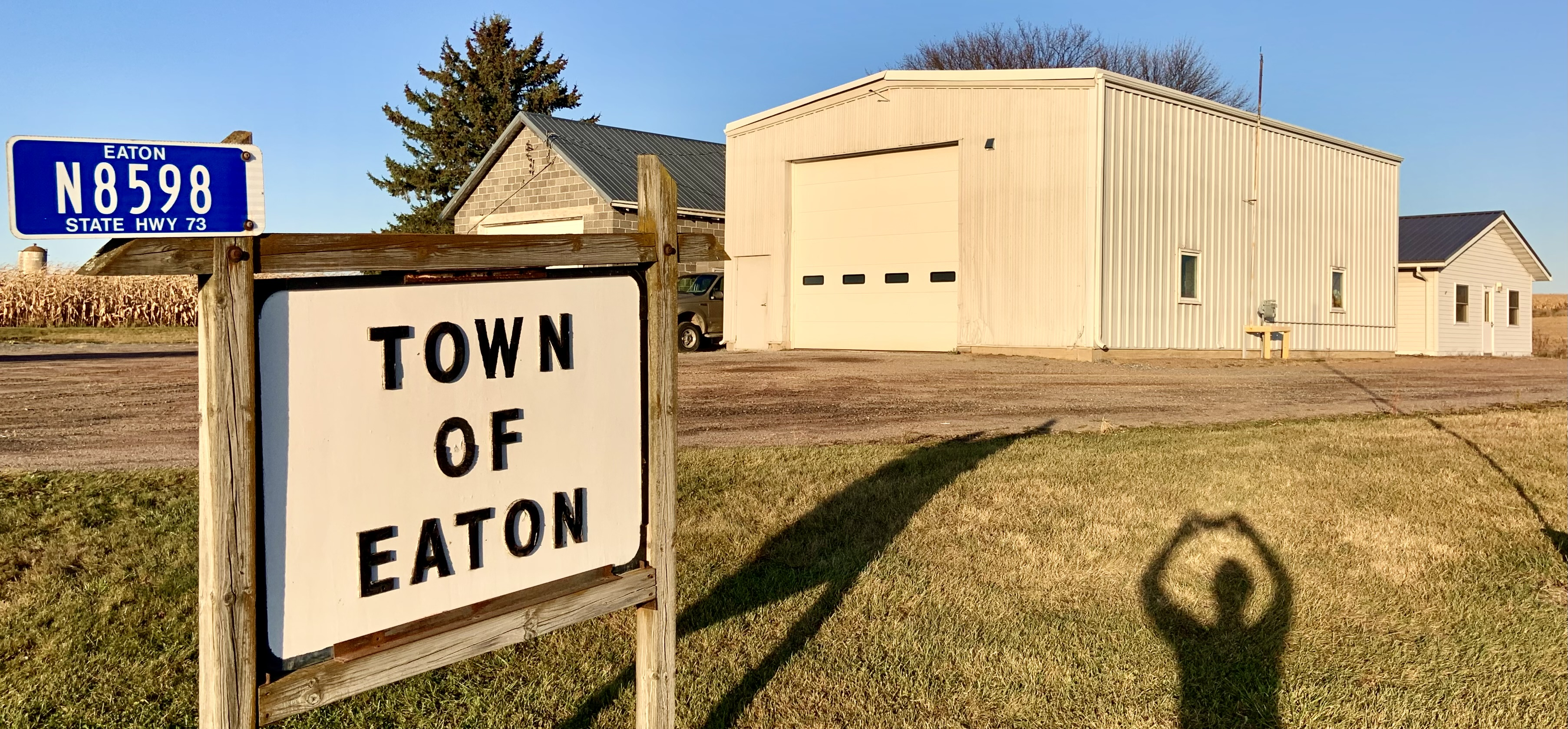
- Town hall

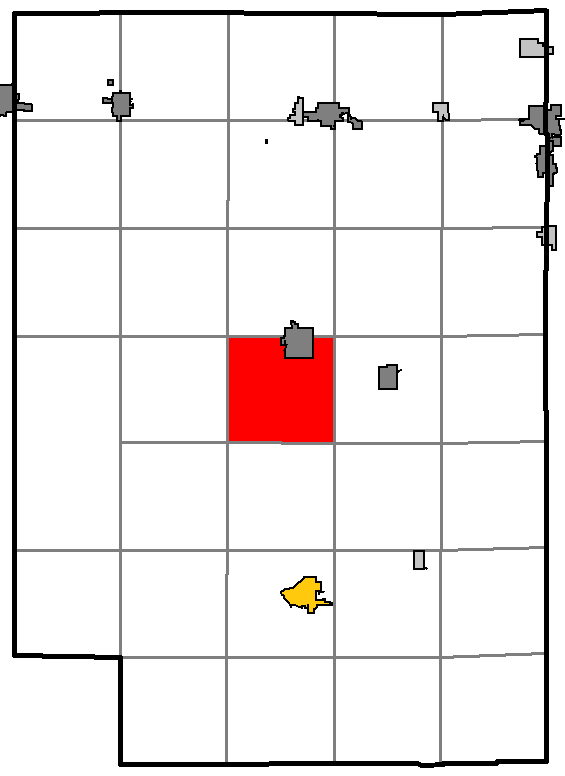
- Location of Eaton, Clark County

- Location of Clark County, Wisconsin
- Coordinates: 44°43′17″N 90°36′30″W
- Country: United States
- State: Wisconsin
- County: Clark

Area
  - Total: 33.9 sq mi (87.7 km^{2})
  - Land: 33.5 sq mi (86.7 km^{2})
  - Water: 0.39 sq mi (1.0 km^{2})
- Elevation: 1,086 ft (331 m)

Population (2020)
  - Total: 718
  - Density: 21.4/sq mi (8.28/km^{2})
- Time zone: UTC-6 (Central (CST))
  - Summer (DST): UTC-5 (CDT)
- Area codes: 715 & 534
- FIPS code: 55-22250
- GNIS feature ID: 1583122
- PLSS township: T26N R2W

Eaton is a town in Clark County in the U.S. state of Wisconsin. The population was 718 at the 2020 census.

== Geography ==
The Town of Eaton is located in the center of Clark County and is bordered to the north by the city of Greenwood. According to the United States Census Bureau, the town of Eaton has a total area of 33.9 square miles (87.7 km^{2}), of which 33.5 square miles (86.7 km^{2}) is land and 0.39 square miles (1.0 km^{2}), or 1.11%, is water. The Black River flows from north to south through the center of the town.

== History ==
The outline of the six mile square that would become Eaton was first surveyed in June 1847 by a crew working for the U.S. government. Then in October and November of the same year the same crew marked all the section corners in the township, walking through the woods and swamps, measuring with chain and compass. The survey produced a map which shows a "Waggon Road" winding east of the Black River and sites of four cabins along the river, including "Vanduser's cabin," along with Vanduser's millsite near the future site of Greenwood. When done, the deputy surveyor filed this general description:

T26N R2W is 2nd rate gently rolling land Some good Pine in the NE part of the Township between Black and Rock rivers. A Saw Mill is about being built on black river in the NE 1/4 Sec 3 [near Greenwood] There(?) are the finest kind of Sugar Lind Elm & Some ash timber The Mill Sites on Black and Rock rivers are without Number Black river is a Swift (?) rough and rocky Stream all through this and the two adjoining TownShips. This township is well calclulate(?) for agricultural purposes well water timber and good quality of sile(?) and will Some day contain a large population(?).

An 1873 map of Clark County showed a "highway" reaching up from Neillsville through Eaton and Greenwood, and into what would become Longwood. Though the road followed the course of modern Highway 73, this was a dirt wagon road. Greenwood was already marked on this map, and three miles south of Greenwood, a Lumberman post office. A wagon road ran east from 73 along what is now Twenty Six Road. West of the Black River, some sort of road followed the course of modern County O for five miles, then jogged off a mile to the west.

By 1880 Eaton consisted of the modern townships of Hendren and Eaton. The plat map from that year shows no settler homesteads west of the Black River; instead much of the land there was in large blocks owned by lumbermen and speculators, with C.C. Washburn and D.J. Spaulding Estate holding the largest share. East of the river, roads had been added since 1873, and many settlers along those roads, particularly in the northeast corner near Greenwood. A school stood where Twenty Six Road now crosses 73, and a "hotel" 3/4 mile to the north. A flood dam had been built on Cawley Creek in the southeast corner of the town. That road from the 1873 map along County O is largely missing from this map.

By 1890 the Neillsville-to-Withee stage passed through Eaton each day, following a dirt road that would become modern highway 73.

By 1893 more roads had been added east of the Black, with about 50 settler homes lining those roads. The plat map from that year shows a mill west of Greenwood where the Rock River meets the Black, another mill south of Greenwood where the Rock now crosses 73, and another near where Mann Road now crosses 73. A spur of the Wisconsin Central Railroad snaked in from Marshfield through Loyal to the south side of Greenwood. A rural schoolhouse had been added a half mile west of where Hinker Road now meets Owen Avenue. Much of the west side of the river was still held in large blocks, with the largest portions held by J.J. Hogan, Geo. Hiles & Midland Lumber Manufacturing Company, and Greenwood Manufacturing & Merchandise Company. The plat map shows some sort of road following much of the course of modern Reesewood Avenue, then cutting over to where County O now runs, with a few settlers near a rural school where O crosses West Eaton Road.

By 1906 more roads had been added, and many more settlers. East of the river, a church had appeared where Willard Road now crosses Fairground Avenue, with a rural school a half mile to the east. A wagon-road predecessor of County OO reached from the future highway 73 across the river to join up with a north-south road that would become County O. A quarter mile east of that intersection stood a new rural school. A few other road segments connected to those, with a couple dozen settlers' homes west of the Black. A new railroad arced across the top of Eaton, the Fairchild and Northeastern, swooping south of Greenwood on its way to Owen. Some large blocks of unsettled land remained - mostly west of the Black - and some smaller blocks were still held by the land companies that sold cutover lands left by logging companies to settlers.

By 1920 Eaton had its current six by six mile footprint, with Hendren split off as a separate township. The plat map shows the modern road grid 90% complete and most of the town settled - even west of the river. Cheese factories appear on this map: one three miles south of Greenwood on Fairground Avenue, one where OO crosses 73, and one on the south edge of the town where Bobwhite Road now crosses O. The transition from logging to agriculture was well underway.

== Demographics ==
As of the census of 2000, there were 665 people, 201 households, and 163 families residing in the town. The population density was 19.7 people per square mile (7.6/km^{2}). There were 221 housing units at an average density of 6.5 per square mile (2.5/km^{2}). The racial makeup of the town was 98.50% White, 0.45% African American, 0.15% Native American, 0.15% Asian, 0.30% from other races, and 0.45% from two or more races. Hispanic or Latino of any race were 0.30% of the population.

There were 201 households, out of which 45.3% had children under the age of 18 living with them, 74.1% were married couples living together, 4.0% had a female householder with no husband present, and 18.9% were non-families. 17.4% of all households were made up of individuals, and 7.5% had someone living alone who was 65 years of age or older. The average household size was 3.31 and the average family size was 3.77.

In the town, the population was spread out, with 38.6% under the age of 18, 6.2% from 18 to 24, 25.9% from 25 to 44, 19.2% from 45 to 64, and 10.1% who were 65 years of age or older. The median age was 32 years. For every 100 females, there were 113.1 males. For every 100 females age 18 and over, there were 110.3 males.

The median income for a household in the town was $37,000, and the median income for a family was $42,679. Males had a median income of $28,194 versus $19,464 for females. The per capita income for the town was $12,250. About 15.8% of families and 23.2% of the population were below the poverty line, including 35.0% of those under age 18 and 5.3% of those age 65 or over.
