= Riverside Cemetery (Withee, Wisconsin) =

Cemetery in Clark County, Wisconsin, US

- Interactive map of Riverside Cemetery

Details
- Established: 1904
- Location: Withee, Wisconsin
- Country: United States
- Coordinates: 44°57′07″N 90°37′50″W
- Type: Public
- Owned by: Riverside Cemetery Board
- Website: Riverside Cemetery Information
- Find a Grave: Riverside Cemetery

Riverside Cemetery is a cemetery in Withee, Wisconsin. It is located on the corner of French Town Road and Highway X.

== History ==
Riverside Cemetery is located 1-1/2 miles west of Withee and was platted on March 11, 1904 by C.S. Stockwell, surveyor. Most headstones were brought to Withee via train and moved by horse and wagon to the cemetery. Several individuals were moved from Longwood Cemetery and reburied in Riverside.

== Mission statement ==
The Cemetery maintains a secure and landscaped environment for visitors.

== Governing body ==
The governing body for the cemetery, as per its 1986 by-laws, contains: The Mayor of the City of Owen, The President of the Village of Withee, The Chairperson of the Town of Hixon plus one delegate from each of these municipalities.

== Notable features ==
- Tufts' Veterans Memorial - the "Court of Remembrance" Built in 1961, is a Veterans of Foreign Wars memorial. It displays emblems of the four branches of the United States Armed Forces. With a bench and podium, this special granite memorial is used every Memorial Day.
- Rock of Remembrance and Reflection - Situated among the majestic spruce trees, a 24x26x60 inch rock for resting and reflecting on the memories of loved ones.
- Columbarium - Installed in 2013, this granite fixture houses 96 cinerary urn niches.

== Interments ==
- Friederika Kruger - (Earliest Marker in cemetery) born Deutschland, 22 August 1825, deceased 11 April 1895
- John Tufts - Veteran of the Spanish–American War of 1898
- Walter Smith - (1867-1903) Whose large marker is used as a landmark in giving cemetery directions
- Ludwig Krueger - Died 1895, patriarch of the Krueger Family World War I tragedy
- C.J. Moody - (1837-1911) Member of the Iron Brigade, 6th Wisconsin Co. during the American Civil War
- Alexander Andrews - (1844-1923) American Civil War, Co.I,30th Wisconsin Volunteer Infantry Regiment
- Louis C. Meyer - (1873-1952) Spanish–American War. Pvt. Co. A, 3rd Regt.
