= Hixon, Wisconsin =

- Town
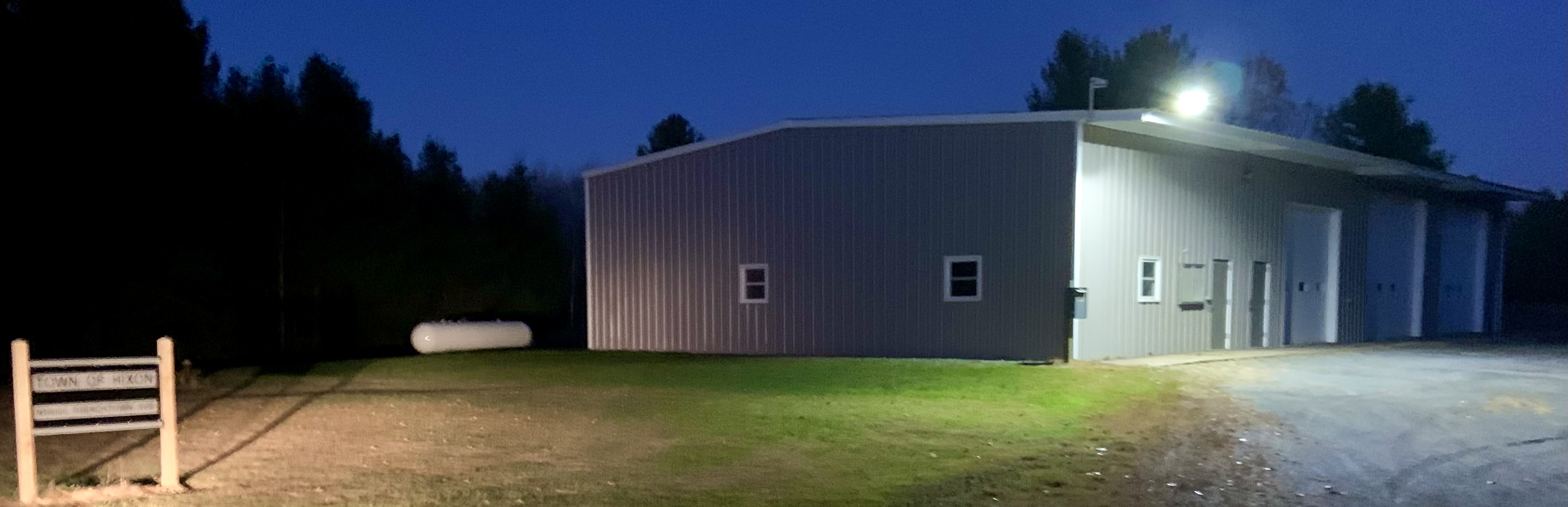
- Town hall

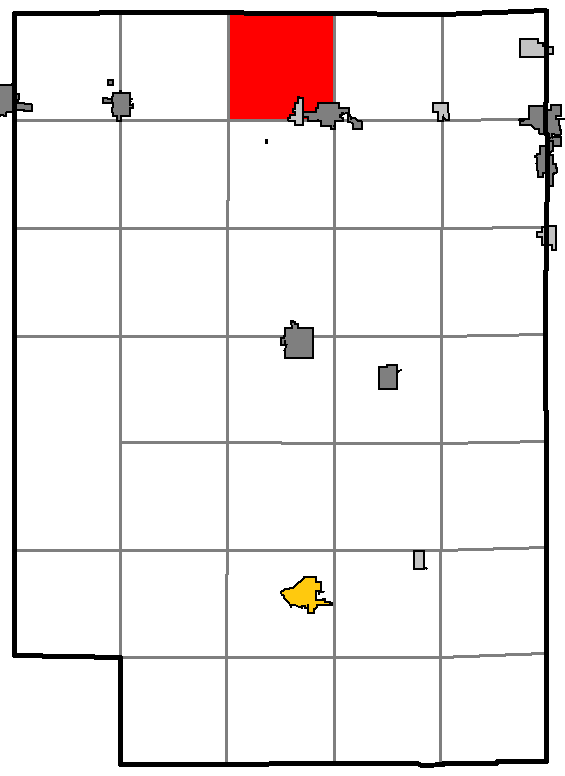
- Location of Hixon, Clark County

- Location of Clark County, Wisconsin
- Coordinates: 44°58′50″N 90°36′47″W
- Country: United States
- State: Wisconsin
- County: Clark

Area
  - Total: 33.7 sq mi (87.4 km^{2})
  - Land: 33.4 sq mi (86.4 km^{2})
  - Water: 0.39 sq mi (1.0 km^{2})
- Elevation: 1,266 ft (386 m)

Population (2020)
  - Total: 902
  - Density: 27.0/sq mi (10.4/km^{2})
- Time zone: UTC-6 (Central (CST))
  - Summer (DST): UTC-5 (CDT)
- Area codes: 715 & 534
- FIPS code: 55-35050
- GNIS feature ID: 1583395
- PLSS township: T29N R2W

Hixon is a town in Clark County in the U.S. state of Wisconsin. The population was 902 at the 2020 census. Most of the village of Withee, most of the city of Owen, and the ghost town of Clark are located in Hixon.

== Geography ==
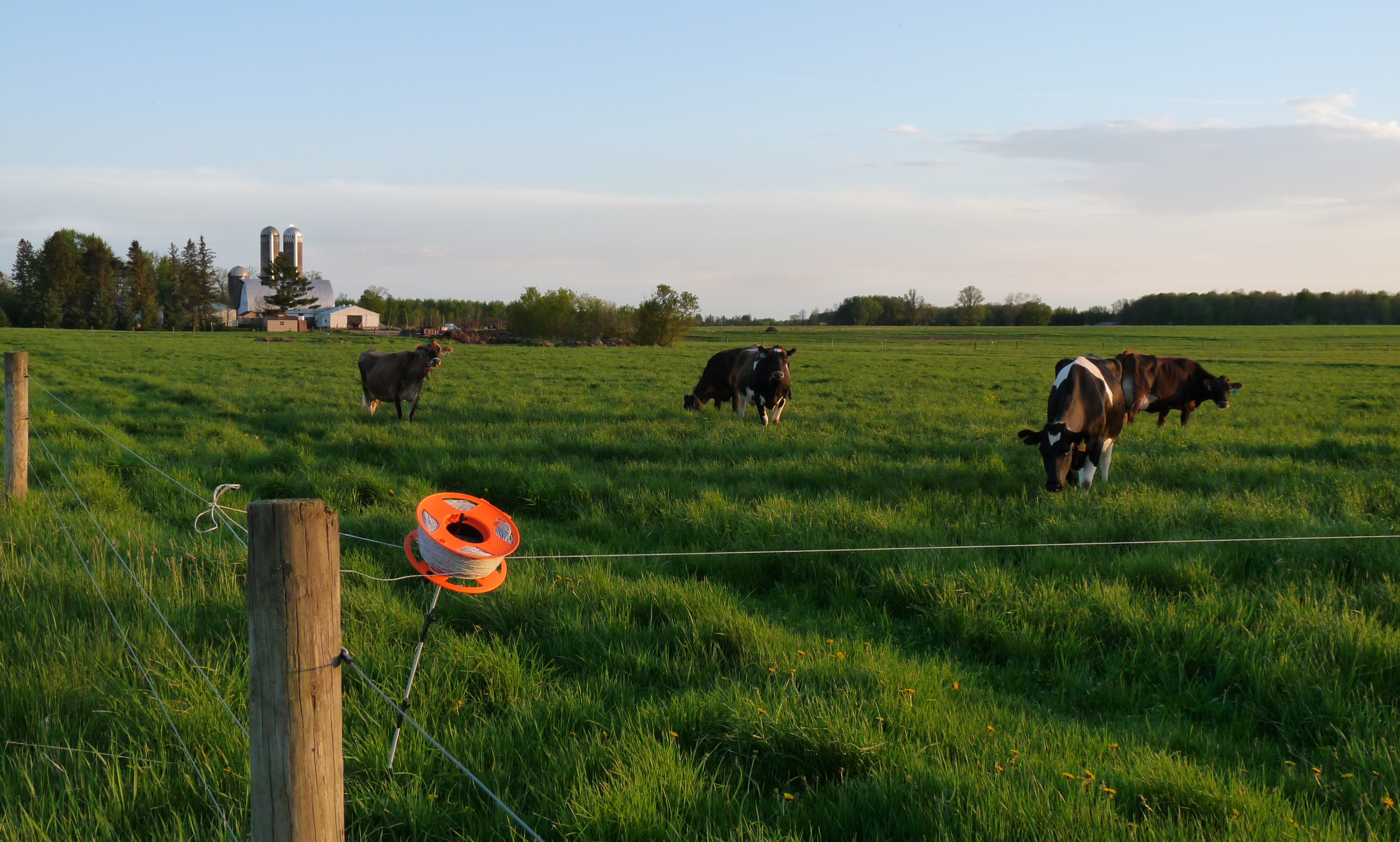
Much of Hixon's terrain is fairly flat with heavy soil. Family dairy farms like this are becoming fewer.

According to the United States Census Bureau, the town has a total area of 33.7 square miles (87.4 km^{2}), of which 33.3 square miles (86.4 km^{2}) is land and 0.4 square mile (1.0 km^{2}) (1.13%) is water. The Black River cuts across the west side of Hixon.

Except for stream cuts, Hixon's terrain is fairly flat. The soil is mostly Colby silt loam, weathered from the drift left by a glacier so long ago that erosion has mostly levelled it. Beneath the drift, the bedrock is volcanic schists and hornblende in the north of Hixon - Mount Simon sandstone in the south.

== History ==
The outline of the six mile square that would become Hixon was first surveyed in the summer of 1847 by a crew working for the U.S. government. Then in late 1853 another crew marked all the section corners in the township, walking through the woods and swamps, measuring with chain and compass. When done, the deputy surveyor filed this general description:

The Surface of this Township is generally level except a small portion near the Margin of Black River. The Soil is mostly second rate. The Timber is principally White Pine of good quality and valuable for lumber.

There are Several large Swamp in the Township most of which are unfit for cultivation. The Township is well watered with numerous Small Streams. Black River Enter this Township in Section 5 and runs through it in Southerly direction until it leaves the Township in Section 32 the banks of which are generally high water from 1 to 2 feet deep and averaging about 150 links in width. It is well adapted to logging purposes. There are no Settlers in the Township.

An 1873 map of Clark County showed an early town of Hixon encompassing many 6-mile squares in the county's northwest corner, which then included the southern twelve miles of what is now Taylor County. No signs of development were marked on the 6-mile square which is modern Hixon, in contrast to the area around Neillsville, which had roads reaching out from a settlement grid. The nearest road to modern Hixon was the one wagon road that ran up through the center of the county, ending two miles north of Longwood. The town was named for Gideon C. Hixon, a lumber executive from La Crosse.

An 1880 map of the area showed Taylor County split off and Hixon reduced, but Hixon still covering the modern towns of Hixon, Withee, Reseburg, and Longwood. The Wisconsin and Minnesota Railroad ran across the south of what would be modern Hixon. It had been built just that year by the owners of the Wisconsin Central Railroad, who were eager to connect their railroad at Abbotsford with the economic activity at Chippewa Falls, which was already connected by rail to the Twin Cities. The map showed a wagon road following the future course of French Town Road to the north edge of the modern Hixon. (Half of that road would disappear in the next map, so take that road with a grain of salt.) Another road followed the course of modern Highway 73 up through what would become Withee and then turned east on what is now Willow Road. A few homesteads were marked along French Town Road, an A.L. Godwin had a home marked west of the Black River, and a homestead was marked near the future site of Owen on D.J. Spaulding land on the Popple River. Most of the land was in large blocks, with W.T. Murray owning the most, followed by D.J. Spaulding, W.H. Polley & Sons. Hixon and Bussell own a few small parcels, as does N. H. Withee.

An 1893 map of Hixon showed French Town Road only 3.5 miles into the township, but it showed a dozen settlers sprinkled along it - among them a Thibert, a Lambert, and two Daphners. It showed a hamlet of Withee with a school, and wagon roads from Withee to French Town along what are now Hixwood and Willow. A sawmill was marked where the railroad crossed the Black River, and at the site where Owen would grow, a sawmill was labelled Owens Mill. Most of the land away from the roads was in large blocks with W.T. Murray owning the most land, followed by D.J. Spaulding, H.H. Camp, and the N. H. Withee estate. At this point, John S. Owen still owned only a few small parcels.

Around 1894 John S. Owen of Eau Claire bought the timber land and two sawmills of Dudley J. Spaulding and Midland Lumber and Manufacturing Company, which had gone bankrupt. Owen dismantled Spaulding's sawmill west of Withee, shipped it on the railroad two miles east, and rebuilt it on Brick Creek, starting the city of Owen. Around 1902 Owen's company partnered with the Wisconsin Central to build a new rail line northwest from Owen to Ladysmith, cutting across Hixon.

A 1906 plat map shows the new village of Owen in the southeast corner of Hixon, with the new railroad cutting across diagonally. By then the network of roads had grown and settlers were filling in along all the roads. Of note, a large portion of the names north of Withee were Scandinavian - many members of the Danish community centered on Nazareth Lutheran. Rural schools had appeared where modern County T meets Hickory, on French Town Road, and 3 miles west of Withee on what is now County X. This is the first map where a cemetery is marked at Riverside. Some land was still in large blocks, with J.S. Owen Lumber Company the largest owner.

A plat map from around 1920 shows practically the whole town settled. Cheese factories were marked on the map for the first time: two on the outskirts of Withee, one between Withee and Owen, and one near Amber, the settlement near the north end of Hixon which is now called Clark on some maps.

== Demographics ==
As of the census of 2000, there were 740 people, 232 households, and 180 families residing in the town. The population density was 22.2 people per square mile (8.6/km^{2}). There were 252 housing units at an average density of 7.6 per square mile (2.9/km^{2}). The racial makeup of the town was 99.32% White, 0.14% Asian, 0.14% from other races, and 0.41% from two or more races. Hispanic or Latino of any race were 0.81% of the population.

There were 232 households, out of which 41.8% had children under the age of 18 living with them, 68.5% were married couples living together, 6.9% had a female householder with no husband present, and 22.4% were non-families. 16.8% of all households were made up of individuals, and 9.1% had someone living alone who was 65 years of age or older. The average household size was 3.19 and the average family size was 3.65.

In the town, the population was spread out, with 35.8% under the age of 18, 6.1% from 18 to 24, 25.9% from 25 to 44, 18.5% from 45 to 64, and 13.6% who were 65 years of age or older. The median age was 32 years. For every 100 females, there were 105.6 males. For every 100 females age 18 and over, there were 97.9 males.

The median income for a household in the town was $36,375, and the median income for a family was $38,611. Males had a median income of $26,912 versus $20,179 for females. The per capita income for the town was $12,092. About 8.6% of families and 12.1% of the population were below the poverty line, including 14.2% of those under age 18 and 19.0% of those age 65 or over.
