= Richard Fillmore Tancil =

American doctor and community leader

Richard Fillmore Tancil (1859–1928) was a medical doctor, developer, and community leader who founded various institutions in Richmond, Virginia including Nickel Savings Bank in 1896. His office was at 601 North 30th Street.

Tancil was an 1882 graduate of Howard University. He received a degree in medicine from the Howard University College of Medicine, and worked at Freedmen's Hospital in Washington D.C.

He moved to Richmond, Virginia and founded the Nickel Savings Bank in 1896 in Richmond's Church Hill neighborhood. Tancil also served as president of the Virginia Medical Association, was a director of the Memorial Burial Ground Association, and was involved in civil rights efforts including the boycott of Richmond's segregated Virginia Passenger and Power Company streetcars in 1903 and 1904 during the Jim Crow era. The bank closed in 1910 after a run on it. Richard J. Bass and Roscoe C. Brown also worked for the bank.

A historical marker commemorates the history of one of the properties he bought and developed.

One of his daughters married Rev. R. J. Langston.

The True Reformers Bank also served African Americans.

Tancil is buried in the East End Cemetery in Richmond. In 2016, the cemetery was vandalized and Tancil's headstone was stolen. Community members replaced it and held a dedication ceremony in memory of Tancil's contributions.

== See also ==
- Maggie L. Walker
