= Laura Bell McDaniel =

American brothel madam

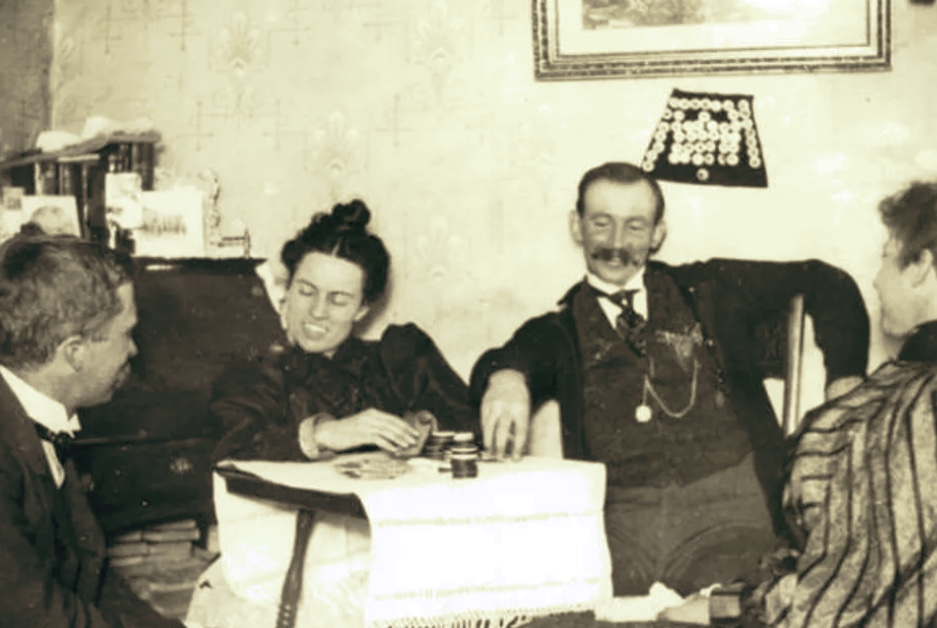
- A Cripple Creek brothel. The photograph may include Laura Bell McDaniel. From Pikes Peak Library District collection
- Born: Laura Bell Horton; November 27, 1861 nr. Buffalo Lick, Missouri, US
- Died: January 1918 (aged 56); Colorado Springs, Colorado, US
- Resting place: Fairview Cemetery, Colorado Springs; 38°50′29.21″N 104°52′19.16″W
- Other names: Courtesan of Colorado City; Queen of the Colorado City Tenderloin
- Occupation: Brothel madam
- Years active: 1884–1918
- Spouse(s): 1. Samuel Dale (c. 1880 – 1884); 2. John Thomas "Tom" McDaniel (1887–1893); 3. Herbert N. Berg (1911–1916)
- Children: Eva Pearl Dale (born 1884)
- Parent(s): James and Anna Horton

Laura Bell McDaniel (November 27, 1861 – January 1918) was an American madam and brothel owner in Colorado City, now called Old Colorado City, and Cripple Creek during the late 19th century and early 20th century. She was also known the "Courtesan of Colorado City" and "Queen of the Colorado City Tenderloin". She had entered the profession after being left with an infant daughter. McDaniel maintained a close relationship with her mother and family over her career and she sent her daughter to boarding school. Her clients were among the wealthy citizens of the Colorado Springs area and she was said to have the "most spectacular [house] in town", managed by a number of servants. Although she was encouraged to leave town by citizens and law enforcement, she continued to operate her business until her death.

== Early years ==
Laura Bell Horton was born on November 27, 1861, near Buffalo Lick, Missouri, to farmers, James and Anna Horton. (Note: MacKell states that she was born on November 27, 1860, but the picture of her headstone states she was born in 1861. and Enss stated she was born in 1861.) Her father died in 1870 and her mother continued to farm the land and raise Laura and her brother James. Anna then married John Warmoth (died by 1884), and in 1878 they had a daughter named Birdie. When she was 19 years old, about 1880, she married Samuel Dale from Brunswick, Missouri. Soon after they were married, they moved to Salida, Colorado, a new railroad town. In 1884, their daughter Eva Pearl Dale was born. Samuel left within a few months of his daughter's birth.

When she began having marital problems, her mother moved to Colorado and opened a boarding house and worked as a laundress. She operated the boarding house with McDaniel's two younger sisters. In 1885, McDaniel purchased a house next her mother's house and worked as a clerk as she raised her daughter and nine-year old nephew, Wiley Short. She began dating John Thomas McDaniel, called Tom. Her house was destroyed by a fire when she was on a trip to Leadville with Tom. She had an insurance policy to cover the cost of the damage, but one of her mother's boarders, Morgan Dunn, was thought to have set the fire. She moved to a house in the town's red-light district. There was an investigation of arson regarding her house, but nothing could be proved, and McDaniel received the insurance money.

She married Tom on April 7, 1887, and the couple was scheduled to go on their honeymoon on April 14. After McDaniel told her husband that Dunn had tried to kiss her, Tom confronted Dunn and the two men got into a fight. Tom later shot and killed Dunn, claiming he did so in self-defense. Town residents believed that Dunn had set fire to McDaniel's house as agreed upon so that she could get the insurance money, and Tom killed him to keep him from talking about it. The local paper stated that Dunn was unarmed when he was shot and he was recovering from a broken collarbone and arm from a bar fight. The McDaniels gave an interview to the paper providing information that was inconsistent with the account given by Anna Horton. There was a trial that found Tom not guilty.

== Career ==
=== Colorado City ===
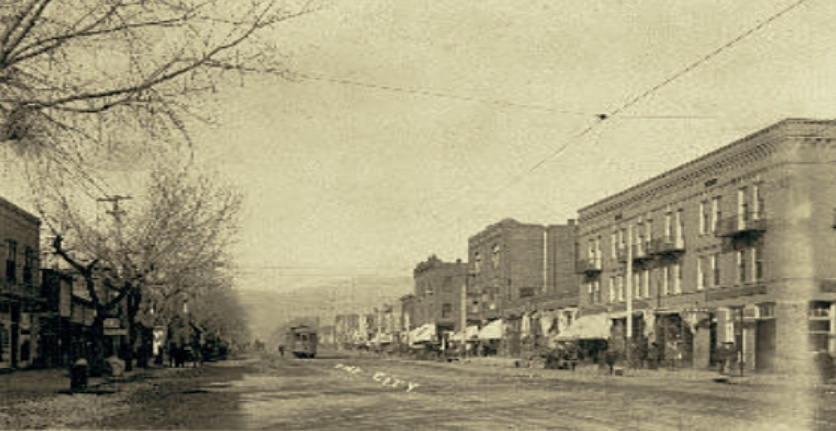
Colorado Avenue, Old Colorado City, circa 1910. The respectable businesses were on the north (right) side of the street and the saloons and bordellos on the south side (left) and Cucharas Street. To avoid being seen entering the businesses, customers could enter the saloons and bordellos via tunnels that went underneath Colorado Avenue.

Both of the McDaniels left Salida and went their separate ways. Laura McDaniel settled in Colorado City by 1888. She now referred to herself as Mrs. Bell McDaniel. She bought a house for a brothel on Washington Street (now Cucharas Street), which was visited by wealthy and well-known people. It was one of the "most spectacular in town" with expensive furniture, chandeliers, and a ballroom. She employed a cook, bartender, and other servants. In 1889, her Faro dealer was Bob Ford, who killed Jesse James. There were tunnels that went under Colorado Avenue and directly to her house, so that customers would not be seen entering the bordello. She charged $250 for one of her girls, at a time when women made $2 working a day as a laundress.

People that had a significant role in her life included Charles L. Tutt Sr., a real estate and mining magnate; Minnie Smith, a female gambler; and John O'Bryne, nicknamed "Prairie Dog", who was a hack driver and brakeman for the Atchison, Topeka and Santa Fe Railway.

Aside from dealing with the challenges of running a bordello—suicidal employees, unruly customers, and managing competition with other houses—McDaniel also had to manage law enforcement issues, which became more stringent in the early 1900s. Citizens became involved, warning and beating prostitutes and burning down brothels. In 1903, she was arrested for prostitution and indicted for running a house of ill repute and paid a bond of $500. She also paid monthly fines for running her business. Her houses were burned down, but she always rebuilt. Her nicest house, called the Mansion, was a big brick building that cost more than $10,000 (equivalent to $349,963 in 2024) to construct. In late 1917, she was arrested for stealing 34 bottles of liquor from Charles Baldwin, a wealthy resident of Colorado Springs. A trial was held in January 1918, during which a friend, Dusty McCarthy, testified that the liquor was planted in her house. The case was dismissed. McCarthy was a lifelong friend and cousin of Billy the Kid.

=== Cripple Creek ===
Between 1903 and 1905, she ran a brothel in Cripple Creek. She returned in 1905, and then began running houses in both towns. Between 1901 and 1907, she had established two brothels.

== Personal life ==
McDaniel sent her daughter, Eva Pearl, to boarding school to improve the likelihood that she would have better opportunities. In 1890, her mother, Anna Horton, moved to Colorado City and lived around the corner from McDaniel. That year, Horton married John Kistler (died 1898). Over the years, McDaniel contributed to her family's finances.

In 1893, she divorced Tom McDaniel. Within ten years, her sister Birdie, Birdie's husband, and their infant son lived with Horton by 1900. In 1901, Eva Pearl lived with her grandmother, who died in 1905. By 1907, McDaniel bought a house on Grand Street (now Vermijo Street). McDaniel married Herbert N. Berg, the financial editor of the Colorado Springs Gazette Telegraph in February 1911 and she continued to operate her businesses. Berg filed for divorce in 1912 and it was granted in October. Berg died in 1916.

She shopped within the red-light district and conducted herself with dignity while in public. She helped the homeless by helping them find a place to live and giving them money. She also donated to charities.

On January 25, 1918, the day after the legal case against McDaniel was closed, she was in a car accident on a drive to Denver. She died a few days later at Memorial Hospital in Colorado Springs. Her niece, Laura Pearson, was killed and Dusty McCarthy was injured in the crash that occurred near Castle Rock. McDaniel and Pearson were buried next to each other at the Fairview Cemetery in Colorado Springs. Her daughter inherited McDaniel's estate of about $15,000 (equivalent to $313,573 in 2024). It was later determined that there was a car with the deputy district attorney and two other men following close behind McDaniel's car on the day of the crash, but since McCarthy was blind there was not enough evidence for prosecution.
