= East End Cemetery (Richmond, Virginia) =

Historic African-American cemetery

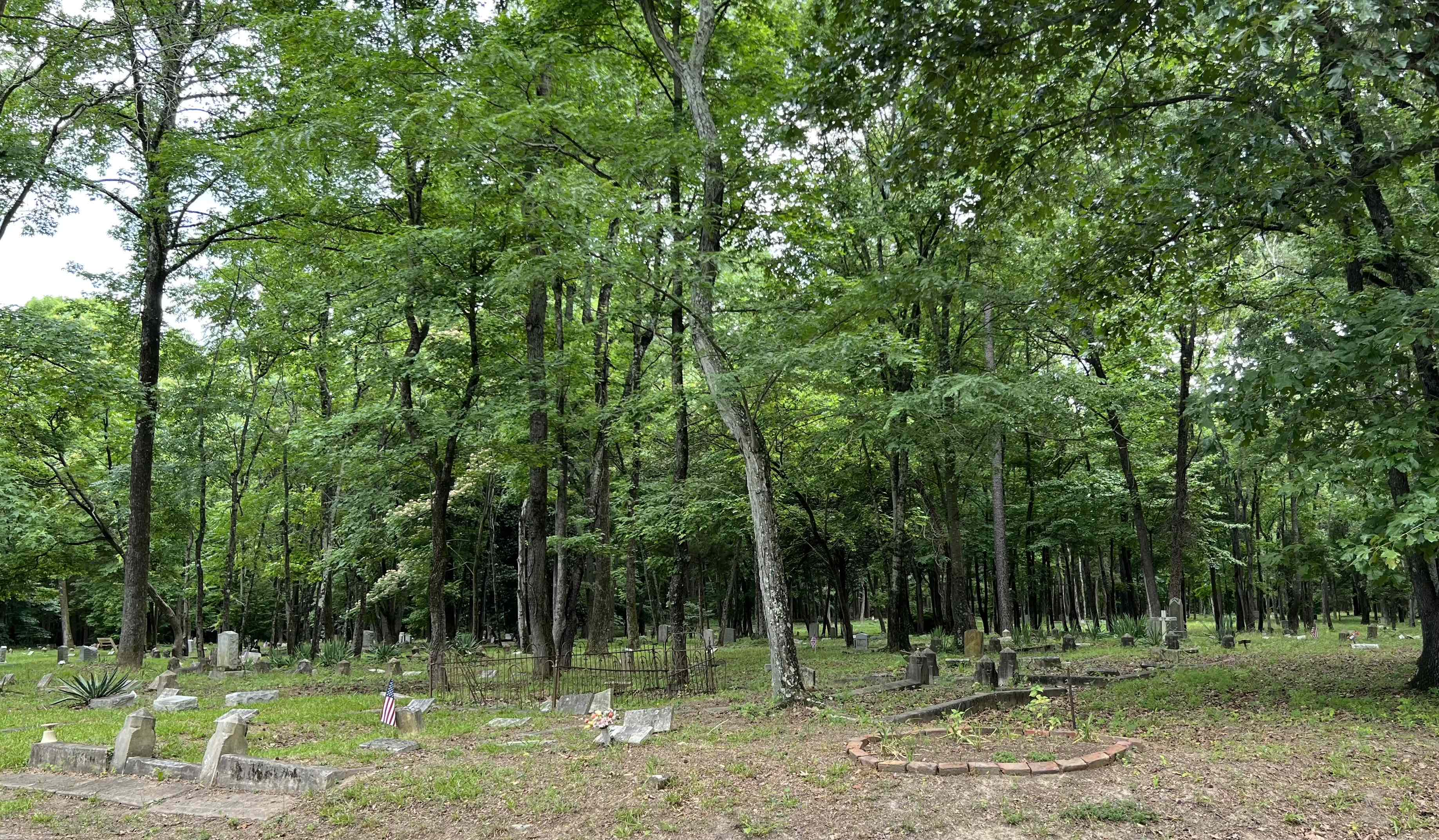

Details
- Established: 1891
- Location: Richmond, Virginia
- Country: United States
- Coordinates: 37°32′12″N 77°23′10″W
- Owned by: Enrichmond Foundation (now defunct)
- Size: 14.29 acres (5.78 ha)
- No. of interments: approximately 17,500
- Find a Grave: East End Cemetery

East End Cemetery is an historic African-American cemetery located at 50 Evergreen Rd., in the East End of Richmond, Virginia.

== History ==
Founded in 1897 by a group of prominent black citizens of the city of Richmond, East End Cemetery was originally incorporated as Greenwood Cemetery in 1891. It straddles the border between the city of Richmond and Henrico County. Colored Pauper's Cemetery lies to its west, and Evergreen Cemetery to its south.

== Interments ==
East End Cemetery is estimated to contain 17,500 burials.

Notable burials include:

- Rosa Dixon Bowser, educator and journalist
- Richard Fillmore Tancil, doctor and community leader
