= Niran Withee =

19th century American politician (1827–1887)

Niran H. Withee
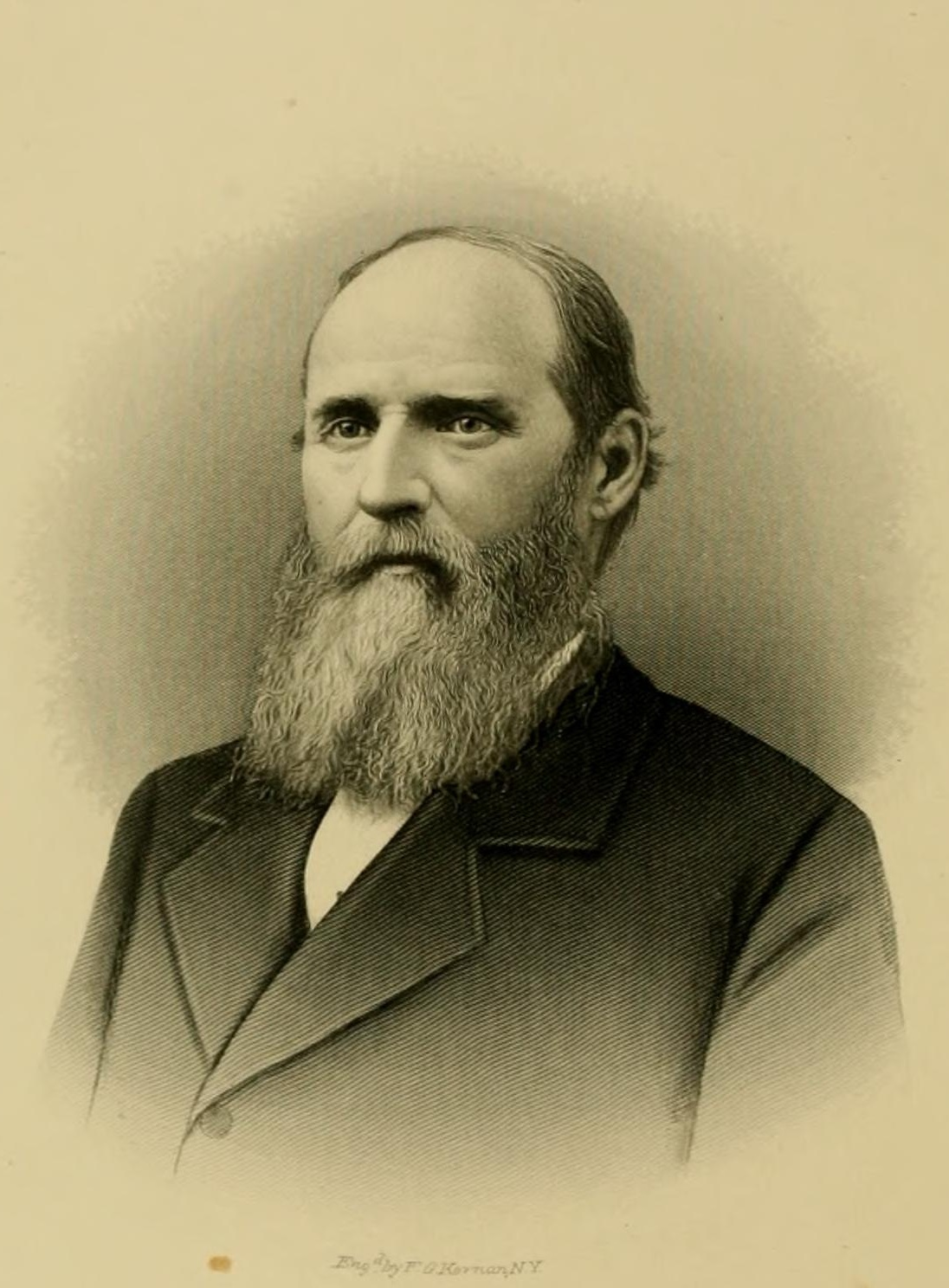
- Engraving by F. G. Kernan

Member of the Wisconsin State Assembly from the Clark–Lincoln–Taylor–Wood district
- In office January 6, 1879 – January 3, 1881
- Preceded by: Solomon Nason
- Succeeded by: Myron H. McCord

Personal details
- Born: June 21, 1827 Norridgewock, Maine, U.S.
- Died: July 2, 1887 (aged 60) La Crosse, Wisconsin, U.S.
- Resting place: Oak Grove Cemetery, La Crosse, Wisconsin
- Party: Republican
- Spouse: Louisa Adelaide Wood
- Children: Niran Haskell Withee^{(b. 1868; died 1952)}; Genevieve Withee^{(b. 1870; died 1871)}; Infant Girl^{(b. 1874; died 1874)}; William Wood Withee^{(b. 1875; died 1955)}; Theodore Owen Withee^{(b. 1880; died 1950)}
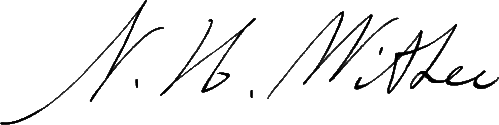
- Signature

Niran Haskell Withee (June 21, 1827 – July 2, 1887) was an American businessman, Republican politician, and Wisconsin pioneer. He served two years in the Wisconsin State Assembly, representing Clark County and neighboring areas. He is the namesake of Withee, Wisconsin.

== Biography ==
Born in Norridgewock, Maine, Withee settled in the village of North La Crosse, Wisconsin, in 1852. He was in the logging and lumber business. In 1868, Withee served as president of the village of North La Crosse. In 1870, Withee settled on a farm in the town of Hixon, Clark County, Wisconsin, and also owned a house in La Crosse. He was one of the owners of the Island Mill Lumber Company and was also involved in the railroad business. Withee served on the Clark County Board of Supervisors and was county treasurer. In 1879 and 1880, Withee served in the Wisconsin State Assembly as a Republican. He died at his home in La Crosse, Wisconsin on July 2, 1887. The Wisconsin village and town of Withee was named in his honor.

== Personal life and family ==
Niran Withee was a son of Zachariah Withee and his wife Polly (née Longley). Zachariah Withee was a veteran of the War of 1812 and received land as a reward for his service. Levi Withee was one of seven children. His younger brother Levi Withee also worked as a lumberman in the La Crosse area and was a member of the Wisconsin Legislature.

Niran Withee married Louisa Adelaide Wood. They had five children, though two died in infancy.

Wisconsin State Assembly
Preceded by Solomon Nason	Member of the Wisconsin State Assembly from the Clark–Lincoln–Taylor–Wood district January 6, 1879 – January 3, 1881	Succeeded by Myron H. McCord
