= Fort Lyon National Cemetery =

Veterans cemetery in Bent County, Colorado

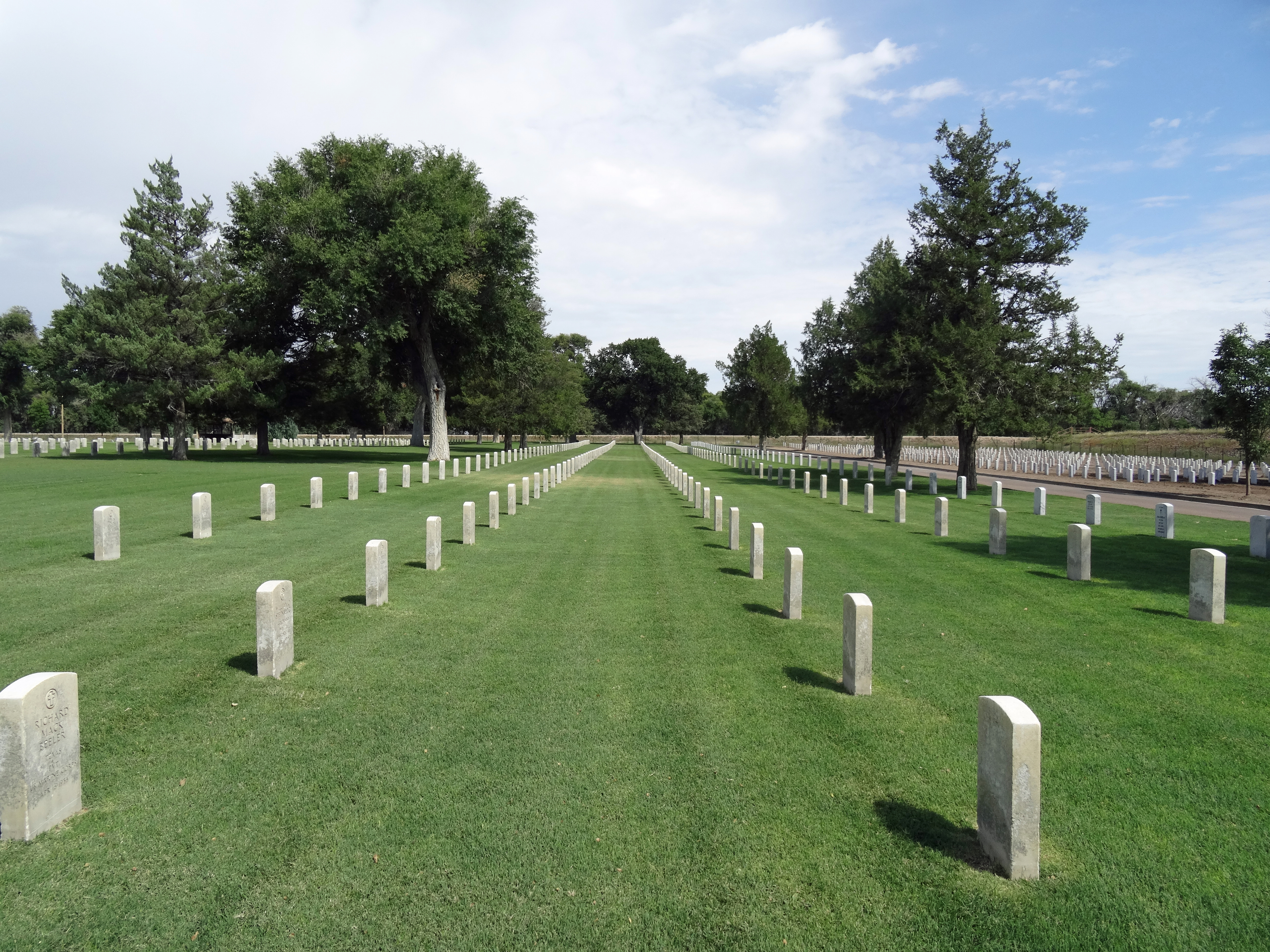
- The cemetery in 2013.
- Interactive map of Fort Lyon National Cemetery

Details
- Established: 1887
- Location: Bent County, Colorado
- Country: United States
- Coordinates: 38°05′05″N 103°07′46″W
- Type: United States National Cemetery
- Owned by: U.S. Department of Veterans Affairs
- Size: 52 acres (21 ha)
- No. of graves: >2,750
- Website: Official
- Find a Grave: Fort Lyon National Cemetery

Fort Lyon National Cemetery is a United States National Cemetery located near the city of Las Animas in Bent County, Colorado. It encompasses 51.9 acres (21.0 hectares) and as of 2014 had 2,556 interments. It is administered by the Fort Logan National Cemetery in Denver County, Colorado.

== History ==
Named for the first Union General to die in the Civil War, Nathaniel Lyon, the cemetery was established as part of Fort Lyon the first time in 1887. The fort was abandoned in 1897 and the remains buried in the cemetery were transferred to Fort McPherson National Cemetery in Nebraska. In 1906 the fort buildings were converted into a sanitarium to treat soldiers and prisoners of war with tuberculosis, and burials began in 1907. The cemetery was transferred to the National Cemetery system in 1973 to be managed by the United States Department of Veterans Affairs. It was listed on the National Register of Historic Places in 2017.

== See also ==
- List of cemeteries in Colorado
