= Saint Joseph of the Lake Church and Cemetery =

Historic site in Menominee County, Wisconsin, US

- U.S. National Register of Historic Places
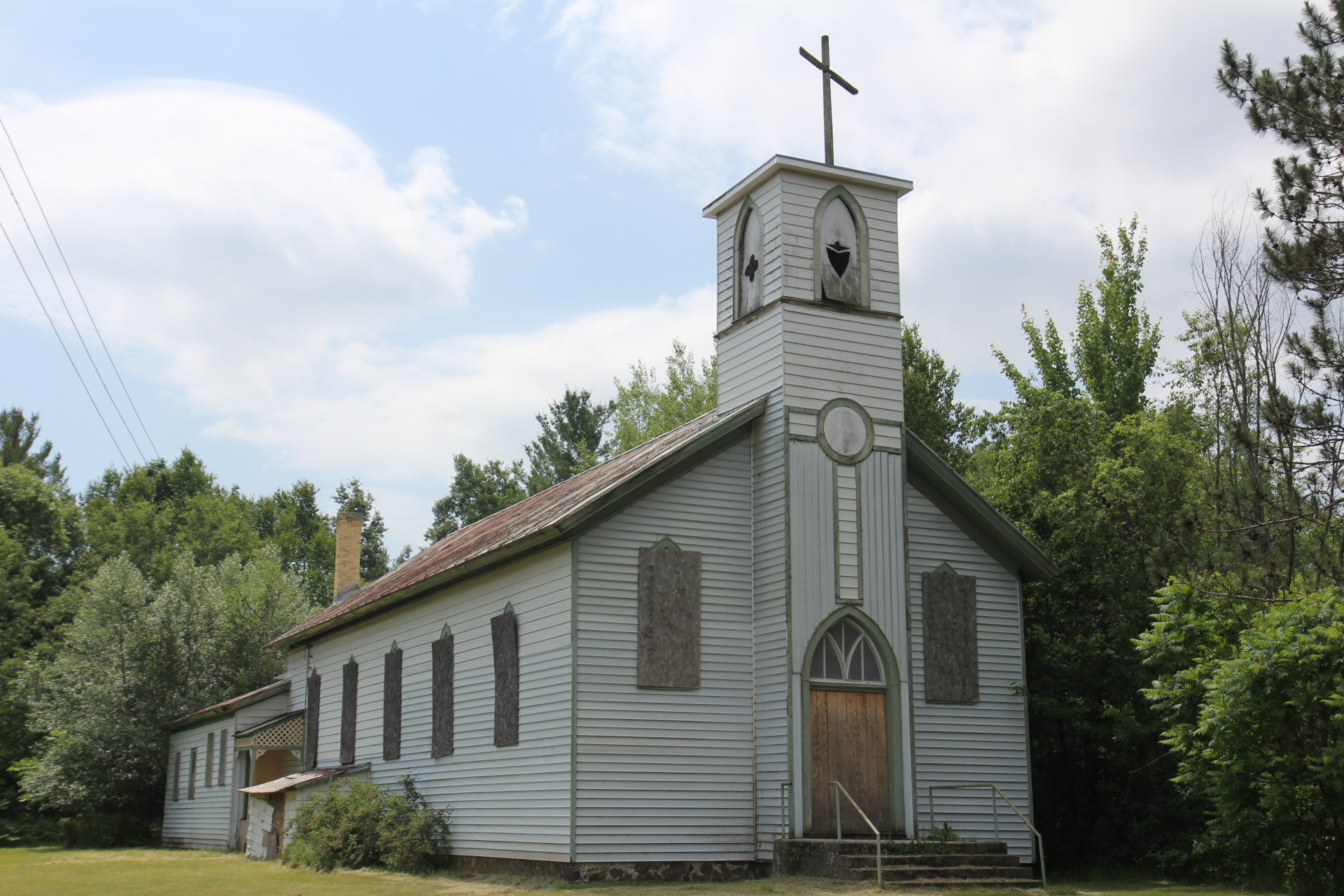
- Church in 2016

- Location within Wisconsin Location within the United States
- Location: Menominee Reservation, Wisconsin
- Coordinates: 45°1′52″N 88°30′48″W
- Area: 6 acres (2.4 ha)
- Built: 1876
- Architect: Krake, Father Blase
- Architectural style: Gothic Revival
- NRHP reference No.: 00000602
- Added to NRHP: June 2, 2000

The Saint Joseph of the Lake Church is located on the Menominee Indian Reservation in Menominee County, Wisconsin. It was added to the National Register of Historic Places in 2000.

== History ==
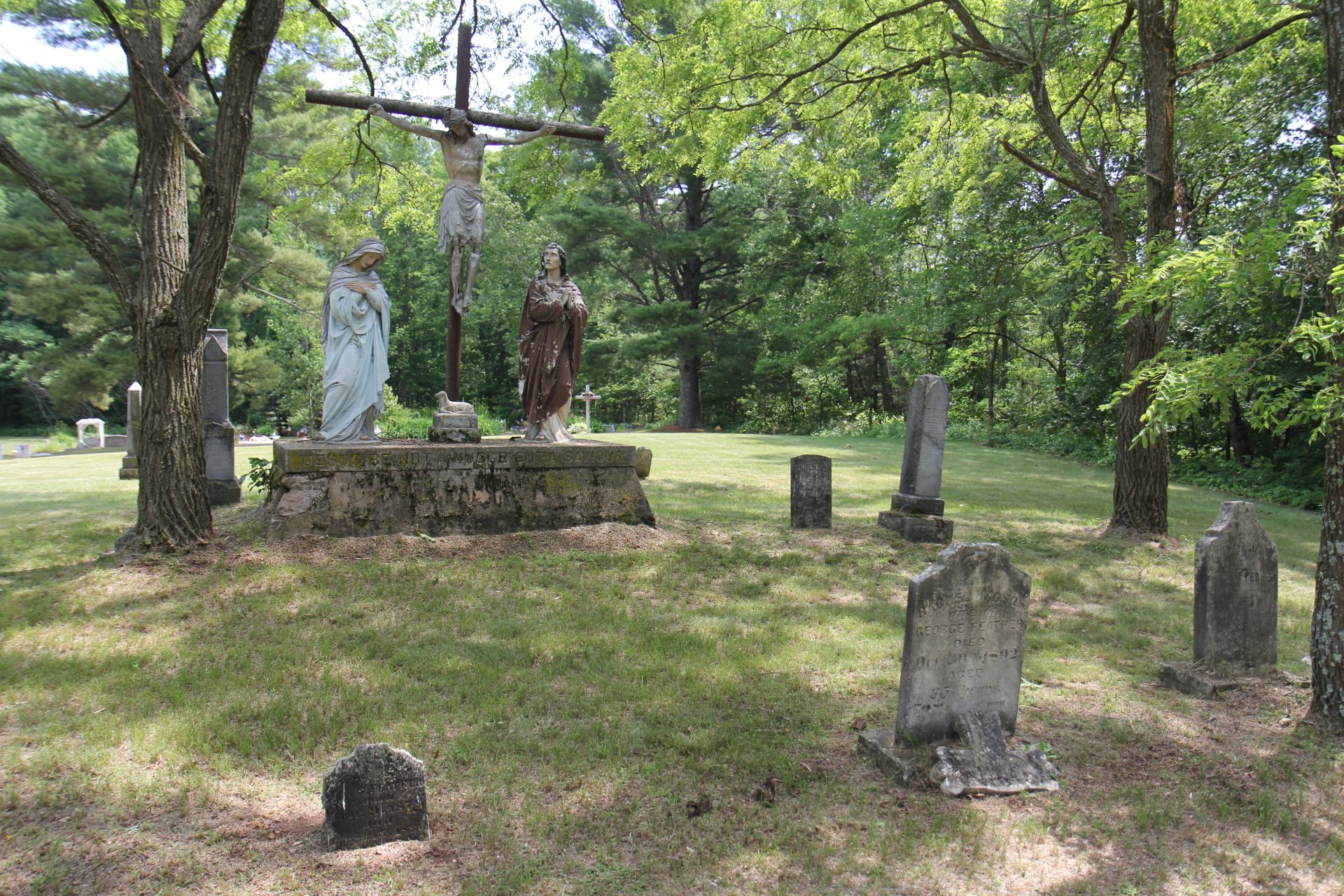
Cemetery

Roman Catholic missionaries had settled in the area by 1875, serving both the Menominee and other white settlers. The cemetery for Roman Catholics and a burial ground for non-Roman Catholics were established soon after. Under the direction of Father Blase Krake, the church was constructed in the 1890s. The site would become a sanctuary for the Menominee to live their way of life. As the federal government of the United States began prohibiting many Native American tribes from speaking their traditional languages and performing their traditional ceremonies, the church allowed the Menominee to do such things on the property. It has been credited for allowing the Menominee way of life and traditions to be passed on to further generations.
