= Longwood, Wisconsin =

- Town
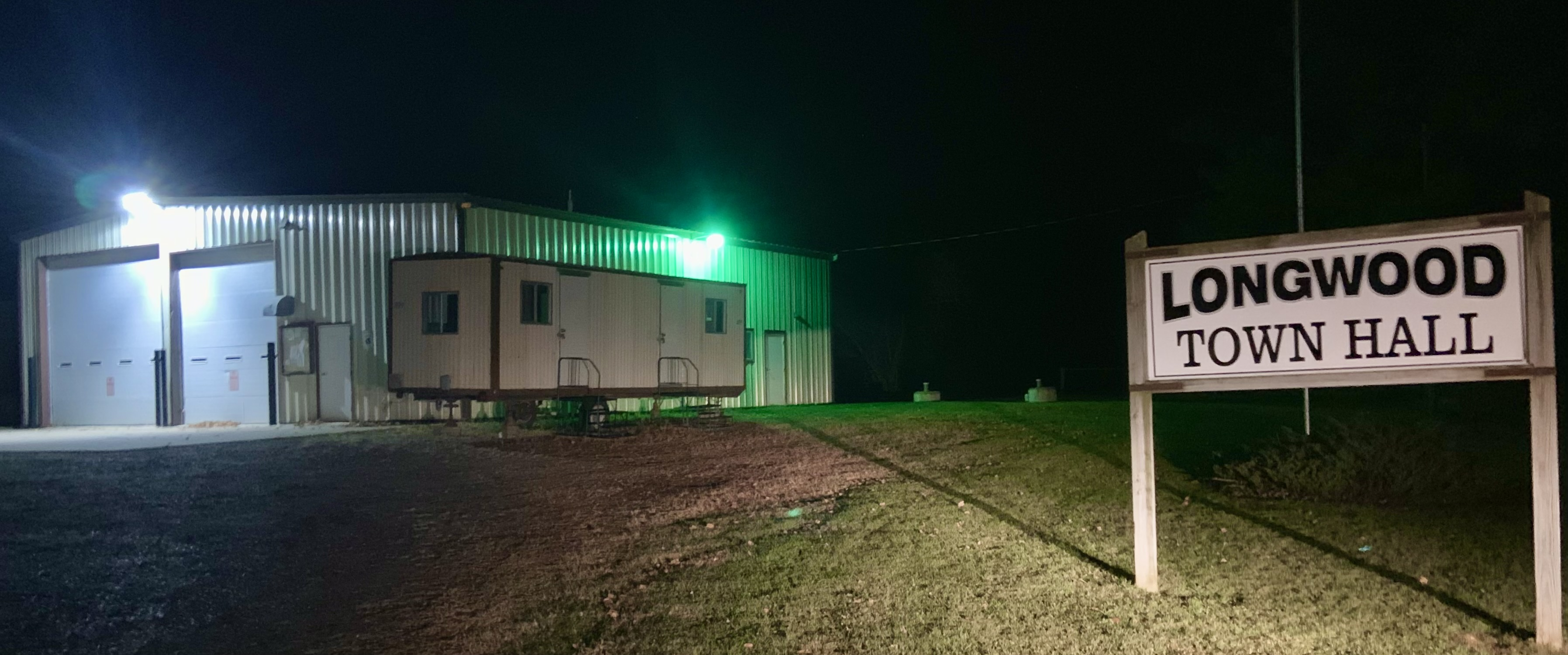
- Town hall

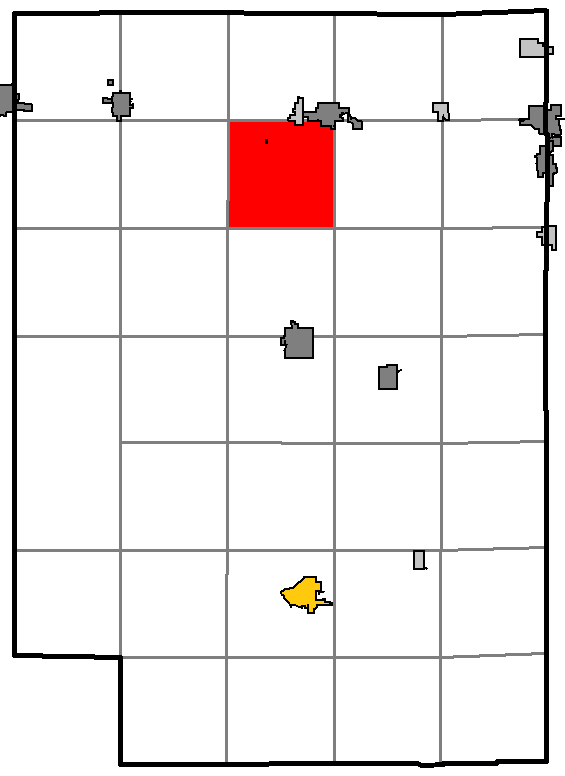
- Location of Longwood, Clark County

- Location of Clark County, Wisconsin
- Coordinates: 44°54′19″N 90°36′30″W
- Country: United States
- State: Wisconsin
- County: Clark

Area
  - Total: 35.7 sq mi (92.5 km^{2})
  - Land: 35.7 sq mi (92.5 km^{2})
  - Water: 0 sq mi (0.0 km^{2})
- Elevation: 1,250 ft (381 m)

Population (2020)
  - Total: 877
  - Density: 24.6/sq mi (9.48/km^{2})
- Time zone: UTC-6 (Central (CST))
  - Summer (DST): UTC-5 (CDT)
- Area codes: 715 & 534
- FIPS code: 55-45700
- GNIS feature ID: 1583598
- PLSS township: T28N R2W
- Website: https://townoflongwood.com/

Longwood is a town in Clark County in the U.S. state of Wisconsin. The population was 877 at the 2020 census.

== Geography ==
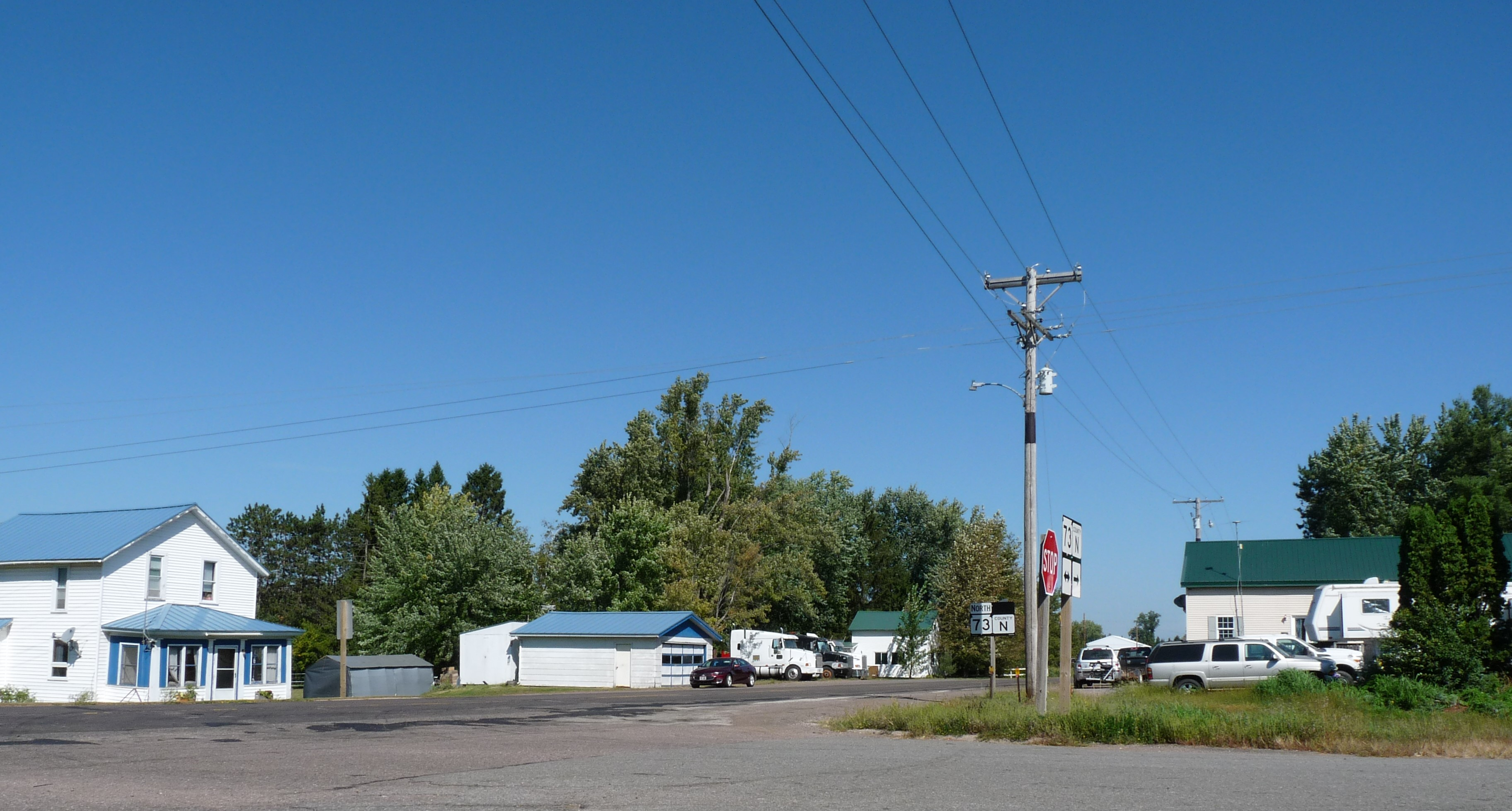

According to the United States Census Bureau, the town has a total area of 35.7 square miles (92.5 km^{2}), of which 35.7 square miles (92.5 km^{2}) is land and 0.03% is water.

== History ==
The outline of the six mile square that would become Longwood was first surveyed in June 1847 by a crew working for the U.S. government. Then in December 1848 another crew marked all the section corners in the township, walking through the woods and swamps, measuring with chain and compass. When done, the deputy surveyor filed this general description:

The surface of the township ... is mostly rolling, some slightly rolling and a small part level. There are but few swamps in it except Black Alder swamps along the small streams. The township is watered by Black River, running nearly in a south direction through the western part, and the Sauteetswasin(?) River running through the eastern part of the township and numerous small streams emptying into them. The soil is generally of a 2nd rate quality, and is mostly tolerably well adapted for agricultural purposes. The timber is White Pine, Lind, Birch, Sugar Maple, Soft Maple, Elm, Black and White Oak, Hemlock, Ash, Ironwood and Balsam.

An 1873 map of Clark County showed a road reaching up from Neillsville through Greenwood to "Longwood PO" at the current Longwood corners, ending two miles north of there. Though this followed the course of modern Highway 73, this was probably a dirt wagon road. The Popple River is labelled on this map with its modern name - changed from the Indian name in the surveyors' notes above.

By 1880 the future town of Longwood was part of a larger town of Hixon. Much of the land was owned in large blocks by logging operations and land speculators, with C.C. Washburn, N.H. Withee, and the D.J. Spaulding Estate holding the largest share. The wagon road along the future Highway 73 had been extended through to the future Withee, where the railroad had just arrived. Other wagon roads followed sections of the future County N, Black River Road, and River Avenue. The 1880 map shows a dozen homesteads scattered along the roads, one school a half mile south of Longwood corner, and another where Black River Road now meets River Ave. The map also shows a "flood dam" in section 13, to help drive logs down the Popple River when the natural flow was insufficient.

By 1893 Longwood was still part of Hixon township. Lumber companies still owned large chunks, with J.J. Hogan and John S. Owen new major players, but wagon roads had grown to cover more of the town, lined with more settlers on smaller parcels. A schoolhouse had been added where Sandy Lane Road now meets County O, and a sawmill on Black River Road.

A 1906 plat map shows the modern road grid nearly complete. Farms are sprinkled through the township, with large gaps remaining only on the west and east sides. The remaining large blocks of land are mostly owned by W.W. Withee and J.S. Owen. The community at Longwood corner shows a blacksmith, a store, two churches, a creamery, and a school. The two rural schools nearby had disappeared, but another rural school had appeared on the future 73 north of Eddy Road. Another church had appeared in the southwest part of the town north of where County O meets Popple River Road. By this time Longwood corner also had a creamery.

A plat map from around 1920 shows the modern road grid complete and much of town settled, except for a few parcels owned by lumber enterprises. Two more cheese factories had been added - one where Colby Factory Road and River Avenue now cross and one where County N now meets O. The transition from logging to agriculture was well underway.

== Demographics ==
As of the census of 2000, there were 698 people, 226 households, and 181 families residing in the town. The population density was 19.6 people per square mile (7.5/km^{2}). There were 241 housing units at an average density of 6.8 per square mile (2.6/km^{2}). The racial makeup of the town was 99.57% White, 0.14% African American, and 0.29% from two or more races. Hispanic or Latino of any race were 0.72% of the population.

There were 226 households, out of which 38.5% had children under the age of 18 living with them, 69.0% were married couples living together, 6.2% had a female householder with no husband present, and 19.9% were non-families. 16.8% of all households were made up of individuals, and 8.8% had someone living alone who was 65 years of age or older. The average household size was 3.09 and the average family size was 3.49.

In the town, the population was spread out, with 34.1% under the age of 18, 8.0% from 18 to 24, 21.1% from 25 to 44, 23.9% from 45 to 64, and 12.9% who were 65 years of age or older. The median age was 34 years. For every 100 females, there were 107.1 males. For every 100 females age 18 and over, there were 111.0 males.

The median income for a household in the town was $30,000, and the median income for a family was $33,333. Males had a median income of $26,339 versus $21,346 for females. The per capita income for the town was $13,200. About 9.8% of families and 17.8% of the population were below the poverty line, including 33.3% of those under age 18 and 6.7% of those age 65 or over.
