= St. Vrain Church of the Brethren =

Historic church in Colorado, United States

- Church of the Brethren
- U.S. National Register of Historic Places
- Colorado State Register of Historic Properties
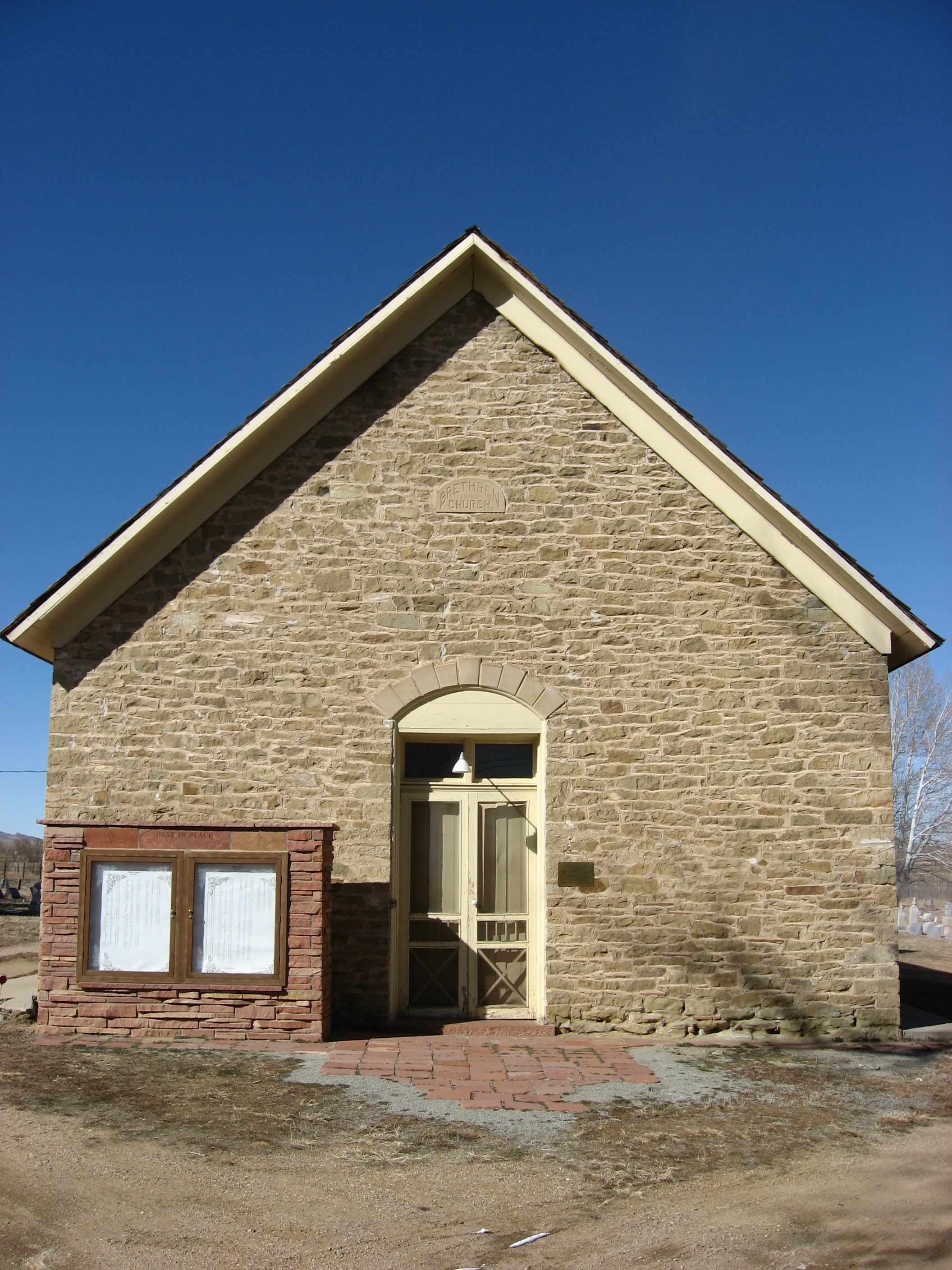

- Location within Colorado Location within the United States
- Nearest city: 8220 Hygiene Road, Hygiene, Colorado
- Coordinates: 40°11′19″N 105°10′6″W
- Area: 1.5 acres (0.61 ha)
- Built: 1888
- NRHP reference No.: 84000794
- CSRHP No.: 5BL.422
- Added to NRHP: January 5, 1984

The Church of the Brethren, also known as the St. Vrain Church of the Brethren and the Old Dunkard Church, is an historic Church of the Brethren meeting house located on Hygiene Road (17th Avenue) in Hygiene in the St. Vrain Valley of Boulder County, Colorado. In 1874, formal organization of the Church of the Brethren was held at the ranch home of Mr. and Mrs. J. R. Ullery led by the itinerant preacher, James R. Gish.

The first influx of Brethren came to Colorado from Iowa, settling south of Hygiene in Pella, Colorado. Rev. Jacob S. Flory left Greeley, Colorado with his wife and eight children to carry on the work of the church.

In 1879, land was donated for the church. In 1880, the building was erected of rough cut stone, which came from Lyons and was laid in courses of unequal thickness. The total cost of construction, including donated labor, was $2,000. The Hygiene Cemetery surrounded the church, with the original Pella Cemetery lying to the south. Church services were suspended in 1907.

In 1984, the church building and the land surrounding it were added to the National Register of Historic Places. In 2004, the Hygiene Dunkard Church was awarded Landmark status in Boulder County.

In 2009, the church was deeded to the Hygiene Cemetery Association, which began the work of restoring it. It is the oldest Brethren church still standing in Colorado.
