= Hygiene, Colorado =

Unincorporated community in Boulder County, CO, USA

- Unincorporated community
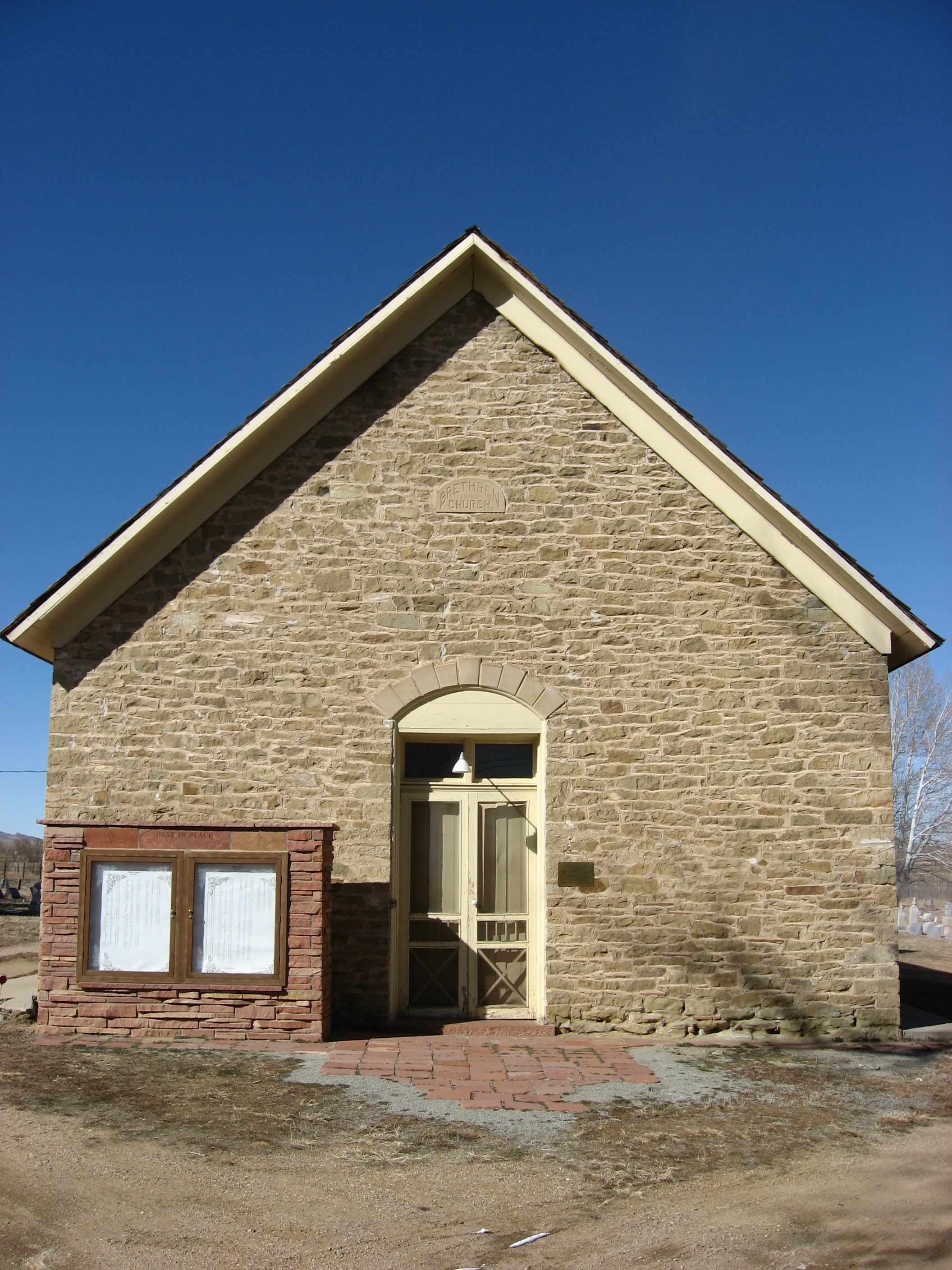
- St. Vrain Church of the Brethren in Hygiene

- Location within the state of Colorado
- Coordinates: 40°11′19″N 105°10′51″W
- Country: United States
- State: Colorado
- Counties: Boulder
- Elevation: 5,089 ft (1,551 m)
- Time zone: UTC-7 (MST)
  - Summer (DST): UTC-6 (MDT)
- ZIP code: 80533
- GNIS feature ID: 178333

Hygiene is an unincorporated community with a U.S. Post Office in Boulder County, Colorado, United States. Application for the first Hygiene Post Office was made by Jacob Stoner Flory of the United Church of the Brethren on May 28, 1883. Originally named Pella, the community's present name stems from a time when it had a sanatorium to work with tuberculosis patients. St. Vrain Church of the Brethren, a historic Church of the Brethren congregation, is located in the town.

== Description ==
The first Brethren services in what is modern day Hygiene were led by James R. Gish in 1874. Jacob S. Flory, a Virginian Church of the Brethren (also known as "German Baptist") minister, arrived in the Pella area in 1873 with his wife and eight children, establishing the St. Vrain congregation there in 1877. The St. Vrain Church of the Brethren was constructed by this congregation in 1880 and was the denomination's first meetinghouse in Colorado. Flory would establish the Hygiene Home, a sanitarium for tuberculosis patients in 1881. The three-story, 35-room house was sought by patients who hoped the area's "clean, mountain air, low humidity, high elevation, and year-round sunshine" would help them recover; roughly one-third of Colorado's population in 1900 were those seeking tuberculosis treatment. It is from the Hygiene House that the community receives its name.

Flory and other members of the congregation moved to California in the 1890s; the meetinghouse would close to Brethren services in 1907 and the congregation later dissolved. Hygiene House would close after eight years of operation and be torn down in 1926 after a stint as a hotel St. Vrain Church was given for free by the Church of the Brethren to the Hygiene Community Cemetery Association, which had used the church building and cemetery for community events, in 2005. With a $43,000 matching grant from the Colorado Historic Fund, renovations on the church building were begun in 2010.

Hygiene has a US Post Office (80533), a United Methodist church, a school (Hygiene Elementary) and a cemetery. A Methodist congregation in Hygiene was formed by 1903 and the next year the formation of a church began. A church, constructed at the cost of $4,000, was consecrated by Bishop Henry White Warren. The congregation had initially relied on the same pastor as that in Lyons. However, the zeal among both the Hygiene and Lyons congregations was such that by 1907 each insisted on supporting their own pastors; this was achieved in 1911. The church's stained glass windows, composed of a large triptych and three smaller lancets, date from 1875 and were donated from a Longmont Presbyterian church in 1905. In 2016, the History Colorado authorized $54,495 from the Colorado Historic Fund to go towards preserving and restoring the stained glass.

The Hygiene congregation numbered 44 in 1912, managing an enlargement of the original church building in 1913. However, the woes of the First World War and Great Depression saw the congregation struggle; often, ministers had to again be shared with Lyons or Longmont. The Hygiene congregation was recorded as having 47 members in 1940.

The Hygiene Community Association was formed in 2011 to preserve historical information and promote the community. "Hygiene Hay Days" was created as an autumn community festival by Hygiene business owners in 2012 and has continued as a community event organized by the association through at least 2019.

The BNSF Railway has trackage on the south edge of Hygiene which is a branch line connecting Longmont and the Cemex cement plant at Lyons.

== See also ==
- 2013 Colorado floods
