= Fairview Cemetery (Colorado Springs, Colorado) =

Cemetery in Colorado Springs, Colorado

Coordinates: 38°50′29.21″N 104°52′19.16″W

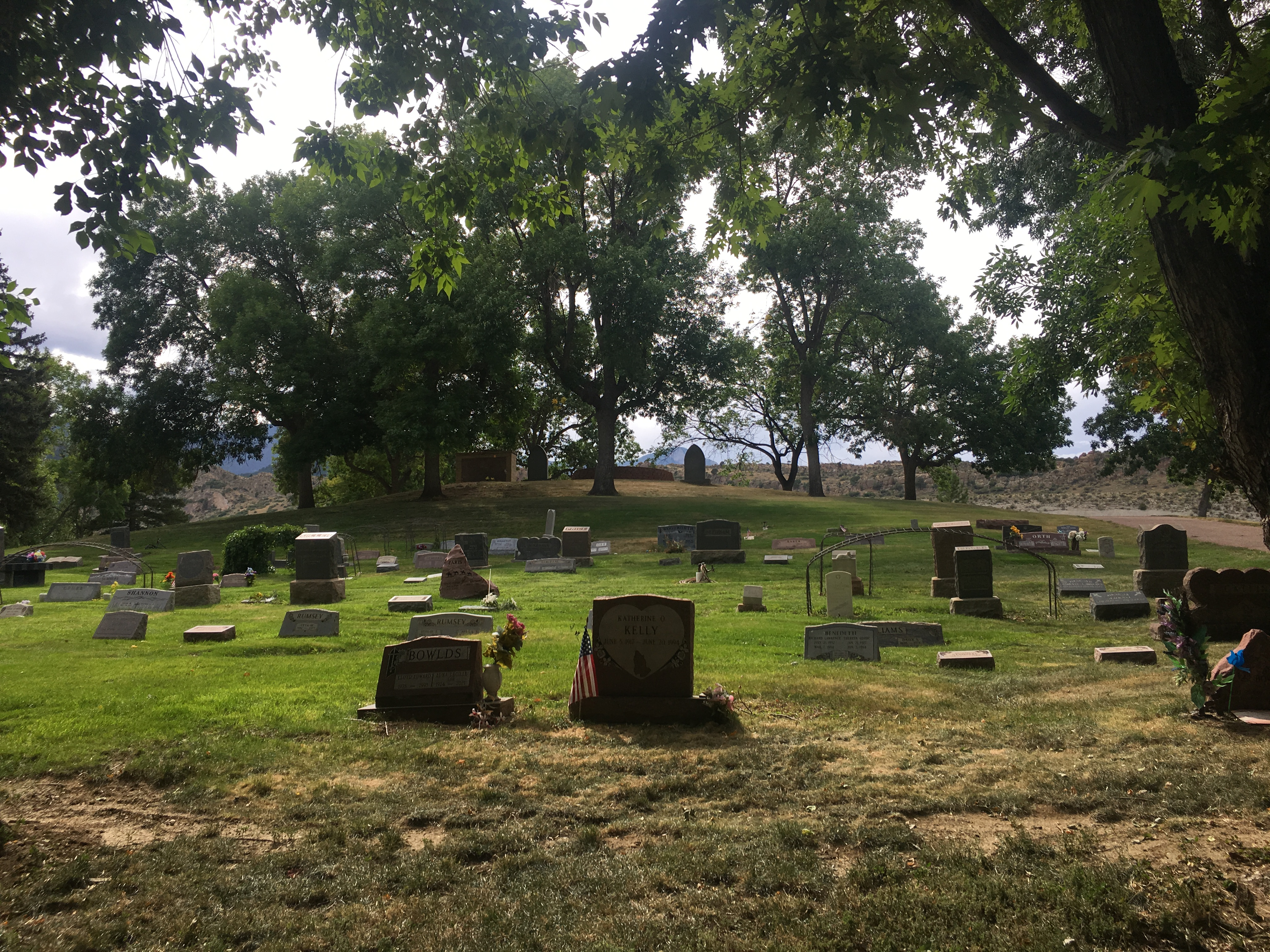
Fairview Cemetery, September 2019

Fairview Cemetery is a 32-acre cemetery owned by the city of Colorado Springs, Colorado. A cemetery for area pioneers, the cemetery was founded in 1895 on the west side of the city, but there were earlier burials on the land. The land was donated by Anthony Bott in exchange for water rights. Bott was a founder of Colorado City, now known as Old Colorado City. It offers views of Garden of the Gods and Cheyenne Mountain. Buried in the cemetery are Anthony Bott, madam Laura Bell McDaniel, Civil War veterans, gold prospectors, and saloon keepers. There are up to 15,000 remains buried in the cemetery.

== Notable people ==
- Louis Unser (1896–1979), an American auto racer

== See also ==
- Evergreen Cemetery (Colorado Springs, Colorado)
