= Pikes Peak National Cemetery =

Veterans cemetery in El Paso County, Colorado

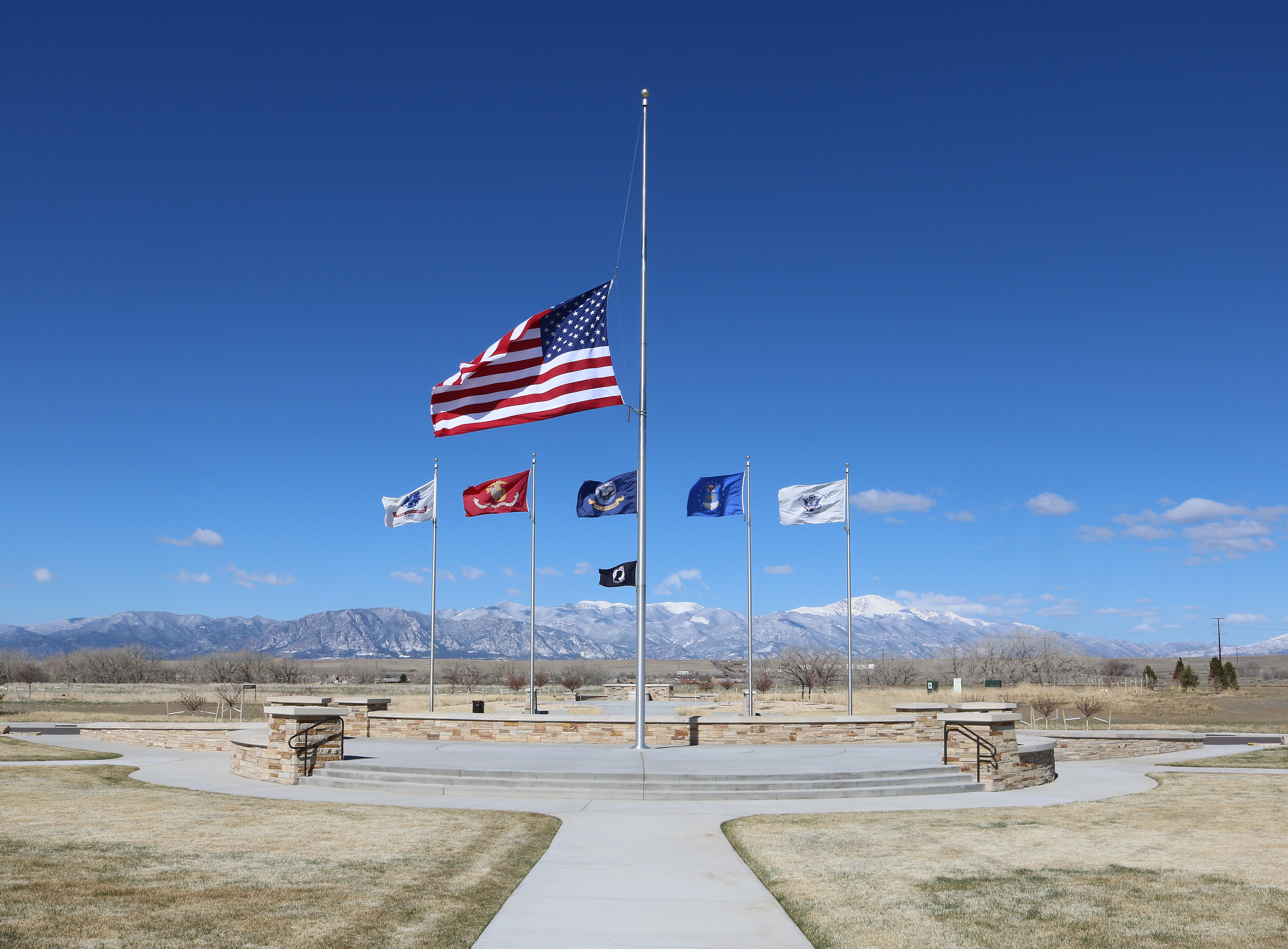
- Looking west towards Pikes Peak
- Interactive map of Pikes Peak National Cemetery

Details
- Established: 2018
- Location: El Paso County, Colorado
- Country: United States
- Coordinates: 38°46′42.55″N 104°38′0.74″W
- Type: United States National Cemetery
- Size: 374 acres (151 ha)
- Find a Grave: Pikes Peak National Cemetery

Pikes Peak National Cemetery is a 374-acre (151-hectare) Department of Veteran Affairs (VA) national cemetery located in El Paso County, Colorado. The cemetery serves the burial needs of veterans, their spouses and eligible family members. When fully developed, the cemetery will have 95,000 graves and columbarian niches.

== History and location ==
The cemetery, the third national cemetery established in Colorado, opened in 2018. The cemetery occupies land that was once the Rolling Hills Ranch. It is located between Bradley and Drennan roads in unincorporated El Paso County southeast of Colorado Springs.
