= Withee, Wisconsin =

- Village
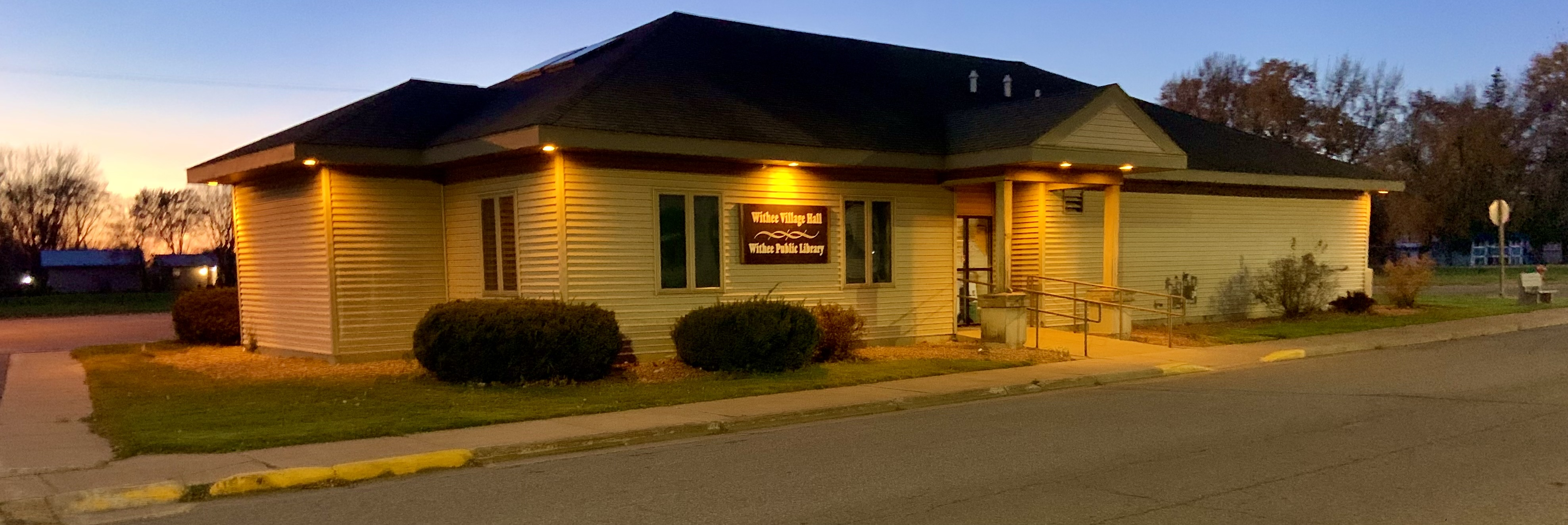
- Withee Village Hall

- Location of Withee in Clark County, Wisconsin.
- Coordinates: 44°58′51″N 90°43′48″W
- Country: United States
- State: Wisconsin
- County: Clark

Area
  - Total: 0.83 sq mi (2.16 km^{2})
  - Land: 0.83 sq mi (2.16 km^{2})
  - Water: 0 sq mi (0.00 km^{2})
- Elevation: 1,250 ft (380 m)

Population (2020)
  - Total: 506
  - Density: 607/sq mi (234/km^{2})
- Time zone: UTC-6 (Central (CST))
  - Summer (DST): UTC-5 (CDT)
- Area codes: 715 & 534
- FIPS code: 55-88300
- GNIS feature ID: 1576921
- Website: www.villageofwithee.com

Withee is a village in Clark County in the U.S. state of Wisconsin. The population was 506 at the 2020 census. The village is located mostly within the Town of Hixon, with a small portion extending south into the Town of Longwood.

== History ==
James S. Boardman was the first settler in Withee, arriving in 1870. George Richards and David R. Goodwin arrived shortly after. A post office named Winneoka was established there in 1874 at the farm of Bernard Brown, who also sold small supplies. Before that, both mail and supplies had been hauled from Greenwood and Chippewa Falls.

In 1880 the Wisconsin Central Railroad built the line through Withee connecting Abbotsford to Chippewa Falls. The initial village of Withee was platted the following year, named for Niran Withee, a Maine schoolteacher, La Crosse lumberman, and Wisconsin legislator. With the railroad came fast growth. E.A. Eaton built Withee's first store in 1881, then sold it to W.S. Tufts, who ran the post office there. Then William Valiquette added a saloon. Another general store soon followed, a grocery and confectionery, a hotel, a blacksmith, another saloon, and a lumber yard. The first one-room school was built in 1883. A four-room school was added in 1890. By 1890, a stage line ran north out of Neillsville, through Christie, Greenwood, and Longwood, connecting with the railroad at Withee.

In 1893, attracted by Spaulding Company's offer of land for a church, a Danish Lutheran minister from Chicago, a follower of N. F. S. Grundtvig, moved with a few families into the Town of Hixon, north of Withee, to form a Danish community and church. Other Danes joined them from around the state, and by 1896 the congregation included thirty families. The Danish language was spoken, and in 1913 the community even hired a teacher of Danish folk-dancing and gymnastics. Gradually the Danish community blended with the surrounding English speakers, but Nazareth Lutheran church remains.

Withee incorporated as a village in 1901, and was the shipping point for D.J. Spaulding Mills of Owen through the Soo Line Railroad. Electricity became available in the village in 1902, provided by the Paul A. Paulsen mill. Most living outside the village went without electricity for another 35 years, when electric lines were finally put up about 1937 by the new Clark Electric Cooperative, funded by a loan from the New Deal Rural Electrification Administration. The village water system was installed in 1907 and a volunteer fire department was established in 1908. The 1906 plat map shows the depot, post office, and a church in the original plat between Division and Pine streets. By then other plats had been added east of Division Street, holding the school, two more churches, a hall, and the State Bank of Withee.

Today, Withee is largely a farming community located one mile from the city of Owen. It includes one gas station, 5 churches, a post office and pharmacy, as well as a few smaller shops. Although the Village of Withee and the City of Owen are separate municipalities, they operate and communicate as one large community, even sharing the same elementary and high school, the Owen-Withee school district.

== Geography ==
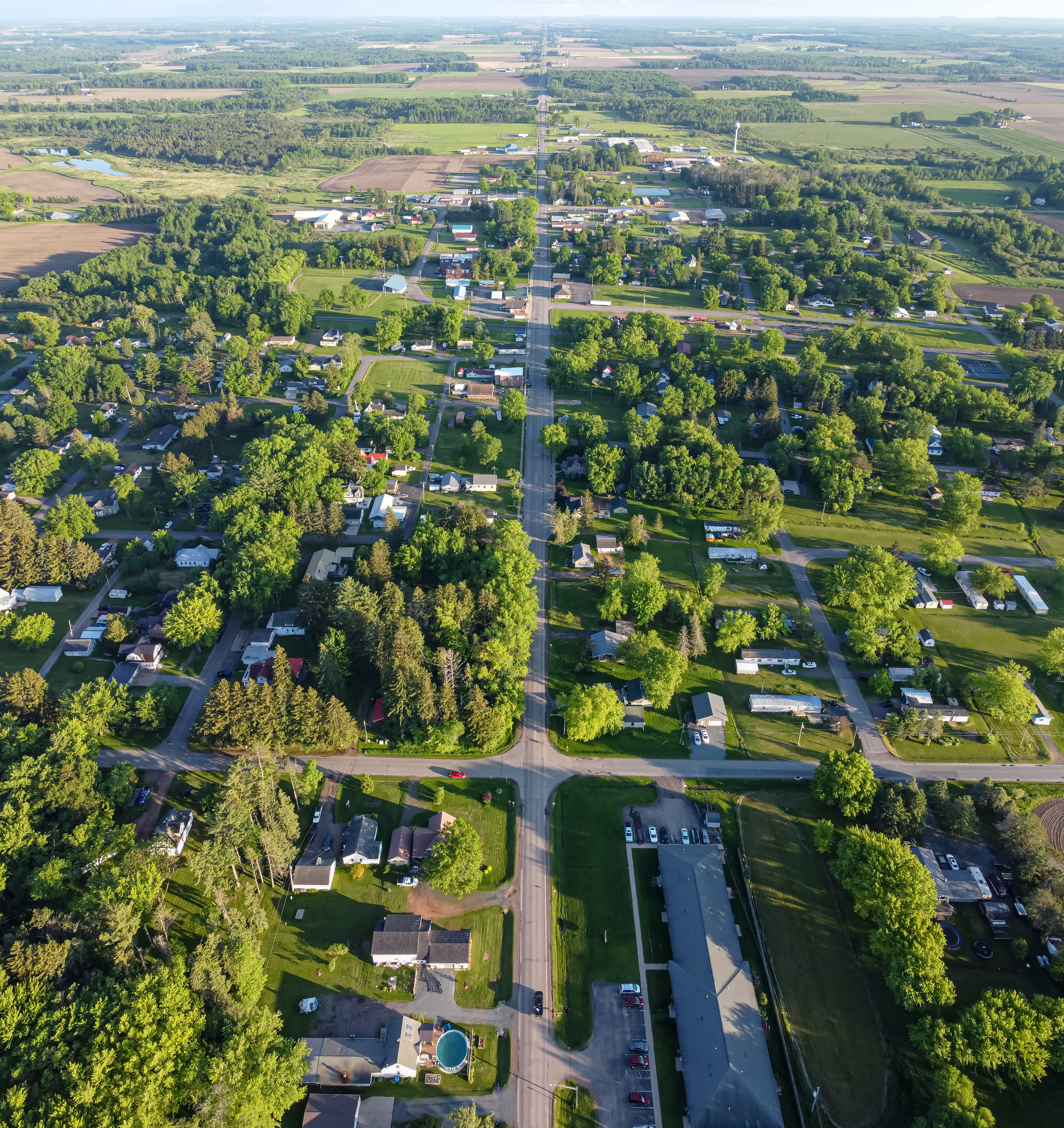
Withee, Wisconsin

Withee is located at 44°57′18″N 90°35′56″W (44.955168, -90.598908).

According to the United States Census Bureau, the village has a total area of 0.83 square miles (2.15 km^{2}), all land.

== Demographics ==
Historical population
Census	Pop.	Note	%±
1910	443		—
1920	380		−14.2%
1930	380		0.0%
1940	329		−13.4%
1950	421		28.0%
1960	442		5.0%
1970	480		8.6%
1980	509		6.0%
1990	503		−1.2%
2000	508		1.0%
2010	487		−4.1%
2020	506		3.9%
U.S. Decennial Census

=== 2010 census ===
As of the census of 2010, there were 487 people, 232 households, and 131 families living in the village. The population density was 586.7 inhabitants per square mile (226.5/km^{2}). There were 254 housing units at an average density of 306.0 per square mile (118.1/km^{2}). The racial makeup of the village was 99.0% White, 0.2% Native American, 0.2% Asian, and 0.6% from two or more races. Hispanic or Latino of any race were 2.3% of the population.

There were 232 households, of which 23.3% had children under the age of 18 living with them, 41.8% were married couples living together, 9.1% had a female householder with no husband present, 5.6% had a male householder with no wife present, and 43.5% were non-families. 37.1% of all households were made up of individuals, and 16.8% had someone living alone who was 65 years of age or older. The average household size was 2.10 and the average family size was 2.76.

The median age in the village was 45.5 years. 21.1% of residents were under the age of 18; 4.2% were between the ages of 18 and 24; 23.9% were from 25 to 44; 31.4% were from 45 to 64; and 19.5% were 65 years of age or older. The gender makeup of the village was 49.3% male and 50.7% female.

=== 2000 census ===
As of the census of 2000, there were 507 people, 213 households, and 142 families living in the village. The population density was 606.2 people per square mile (233.5/km^{2}). There were 228 housing units at an average density of 272.1 per square mile (104.8/km^{2}). The racial makeup of the village was 98.43% White, 0.39% Native American, 0.20% Asian, 0.20% from other races, and 0.79% from two or more races. 0.39% of the population were Hispanic or Latino of any race.

There were 213 households, out of which 28.6% had children under the age of 18 living with them, 51.6% were married couples living together, 11.3% had a female householder with no husband present, and 33.3% were non-families. 29.6% of all households were made up of individuals, and 18.8% had someone living alone who was 65 years of age or older. The average household size was 2.36 and the average family size was 2.89.

In the village, the population was spread out, with 24.0% under the age of 18, 5.9% from 18 to 24, 28.5% from 25 to 44, 21.1% from 45 to 64, and 20.5% who were 65 years of age or older. The median age was 40 years. For every 100 females, there were 94.6 males. For every 100 females age 18 and over, there were 85.6 males.

The median income for a household in the village was $29,625, and the median income for a family was $38,542. Males had a median income of $31,250 versus $21,250 for females. The per capita income for the village was $18,874. About 3.8% of families and 6.8% of the population were below the poverty line, including 15.2% of those under age 18 and 9.5% of those age 65 or over.

== Notable people ==
- Bruce F. Beilfuss (1915–1986), chief justice of the Wisconsin Supreme Court
