= Withee (town), Wisconsin =

Town in Clark County, Wisconsin

Withee, Wisconsin
- Town
- Town of Withee
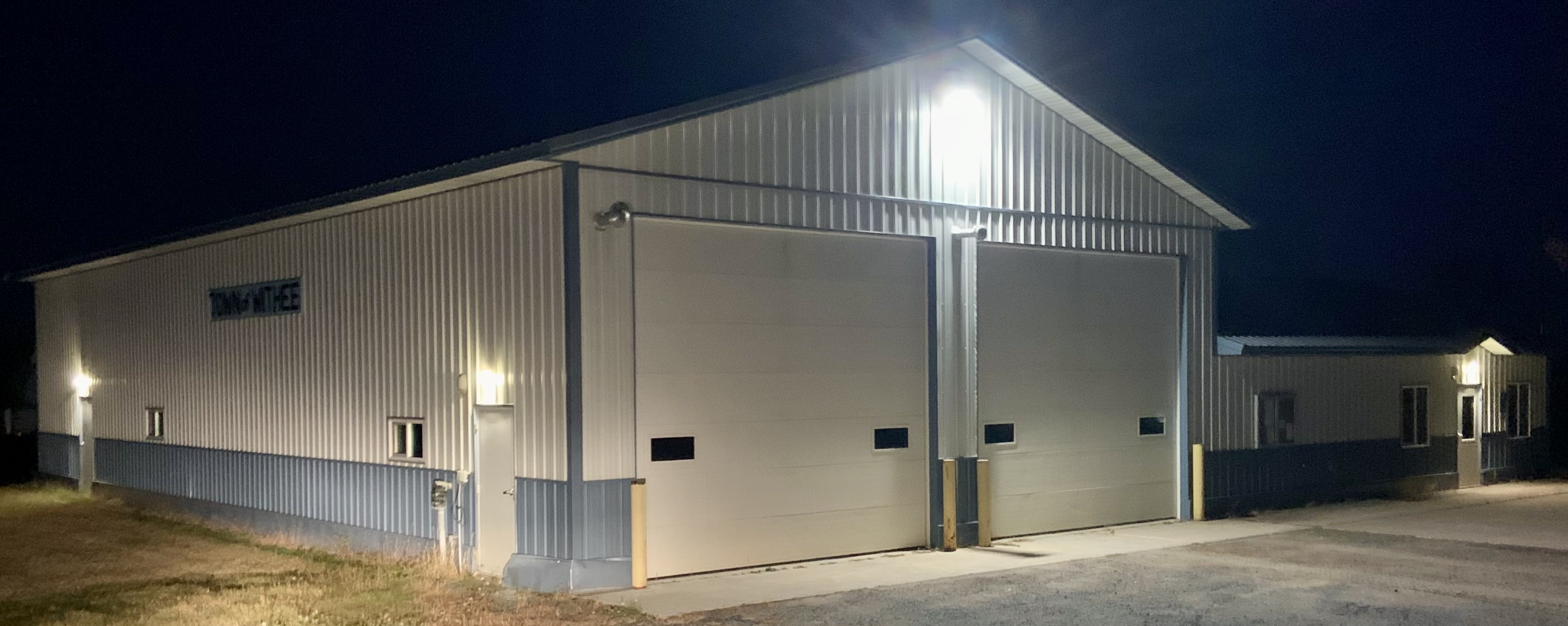
- Withee Town Hall

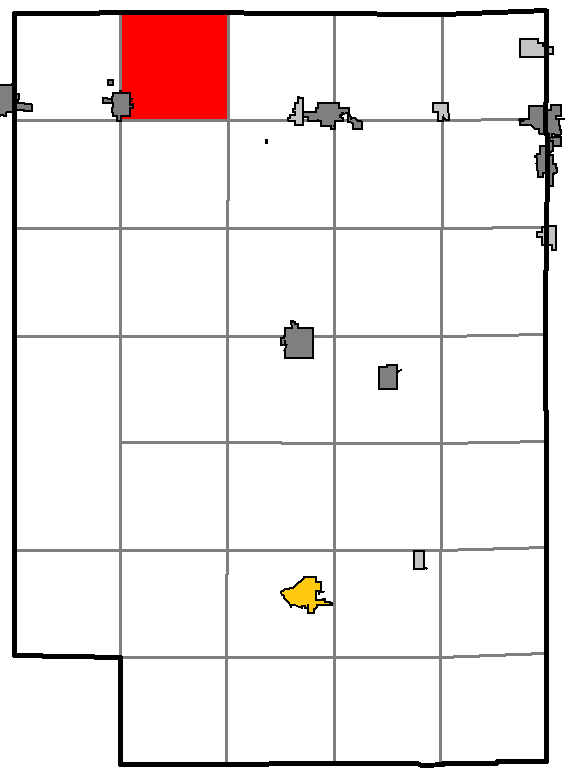
- Location of WIthee, Clark County

- Location of Clark County, Wisconsin
- Coordinates: 44°59′30″N 90°43′59″W
- Country: United States
- State: Wisconsin
- County: Clark

Area
  - Total: 35.13 sq mi (91.0 km^{2})
  - Land: 35.05 sq mi (90.8 km^{2})
  - Water: 0.08 sq mi (0.21 km^{2})

Population (2020)
  - Total: 1,033
  - Density: 29.47/sq mi (11.38/km^{2})
- Time zone: UTC-6 (Central (CST))
  - Summer (DST): UTC-5 (CDT)
- Area code(s): 715 and 534
- GNIS feature ID: 1584465
- PLSS township: T29N R3W

Withee is a town in Clark County in the U.S. state of Wisconsin. The population was 1,033 at the 2020 census. The unincorporated community of Lombard is located in the town.

== Geography ==
According to the United States Census Bureau, the town has a total area of 35.2 square miles (91.1 km^{2}), of which 35.1 square miles (91.0 km^{2}) is land and 0.04 square miles (0.1 km^{2}) (0.06%) is water.

== History ==
The outline of the six mile square that would become the town of Withee was first surveyed in the summer of 1847 by a crew working for the U.S. government. Then in late 1853 another crew marked all the section corners in the township, walking through the woods and swamps, measuring with chain and compass. When done, the deputy surveyor filed this general description:

This Township contains numerous(?) Small Swamps and many of considerable extent most of which are Tamarac though some of them are Timbered with Spruce Alder and Black Ash most of which are unfit for cultivation The Swamps are situated mostly in the North part of the Township the Surface of the Township is mostly level Soil 2nd & 3rd rate in the South part of the Township it is generally good 2nd rate and generally well adapted for farming purposes The Timber on the South 1/2 of the Township is principally Linden White Pine & Sugar tree On the North 1/2 it is principally Hemlock & White Pine (the White Pine is of good quality) There are no Settlers in the Township.

== Demographics ==
As of the census of 2000, there were 885 people, 262 households, and 213 families residing in the town. The population density was 25.2 people per square mile (9.7/km^{2}). There were 277 housing units at an average density of 7.9 per square mile (3.0/km^{2}). The racial makeup of the town was 99.66% White, 0.11% Native American, 0.11% Asian, and 0.11% from two or more races. 0.11% of the population were Hispanic or Latino of any race.

There were 262 households, of which 45.4% had children under the age of 18 living with them, 73.3% were married couples living together, 3.4% had a female householder with no husband present, and 18.7% were non-families. 14.9% of all households were made up of individuals, and 8.4% had someone living alone who was 65 years of age or older. The average household size was 3.35 and the average family size was 3.79.

In the town, the population was 37.2% under the age of 18, 9.9% from 18 to 24, 22.5% from 25 to 44, 20.5% from 45 to 64, and 9.9% who were 65 years of age or older. The median age was 28 years. For every 100 females, there were 102.5 males. For every 100 females age 18 and over, there were 107.5 males.

The median income for a household in the town was $33,839, and the median income for a family was $36,607. Males had a median income of $28,750 versus $18,056 for females. The per capita income for the town was $13,826. About 12.4% of families and 15.3% of the population were below the poverty line, including 18.6% of those under age 18 and 17.4% of those age 65 or over.

A large percentage of the population relies on farming or agriculture-related work. The surrounding community includes many Mennonite people, most of whom are farmers, but some own shops.
