= African burial grounds and historic African American cemeteries of Richmond, Virginia =

Historic African American cemetery in Richmond, Virginia

The historic city of Richmond, Virginia has two African Burial Grounds, the Shockoe Bottom African Burial Ground (active 1799–1816), and the Shockoe Hill African Burying Ground (active 1816–1879). The city is also home to several other important and historic African American cemeteries, as well as a few lesser known, long hidden, unrecognizable or forgotten places of interment such as the Old Baptist Church Burying Ground

== Richmond's African burial grounds ==
- Shockoe Bottom African Burial Ground was active from 1799 to 1816. It was the first municipal burial ground of the city of Richmond. It was historically known as the "Burial Ground for Negroes". It is located at 1554 E Broad St. (alternate address 1520 E Marshall St.), across from the site of Lumpkin's Jail, in Shockoe Bottom, historically known as Shockoe Valley.
- Shockoe Hill African Burying Ground, (Richmond's 2nd African Burial Ground) was established in 1816 by the city of Richmond, as the replacement for the Burial Ground for Negroes. It began as two (1 acre) parcels at the northeastern corner of N 5th St. and Marshall St. (now called Hospital St.). It was expanded over time to 31 acres. Over 22,000 people of African descent were interred within its grounds. It is the largest known burial ground for free people of color and the enslaved in the United States. It is located at 1305 N. 5th St., on the northern edge of Shockoe Hill, a mile and a half away from the Shockoe Bottom African Burial Ground. It is one of Virginia's most endangered historic places. Current threats to the burial ground include the DC2RVA high-speed rail project, the east-west Commonwealth Corridor, and the proposed widening of I-64, as well as other infrastructure projects.

== Richmond's other historic African American cemeteries ==
- Barton Heights Cemeteries is the present day name of six contiguous cemeteries located within the city of Richmond. The Phoenix Burial Ground (est. 1815) later renamed Cedarwood, was the first of the six cemeteries to be established. The other five cemeteries are Union (est. 1846) called Mechanics after emancipation, Methodist (est. 1855), Ebenezer (est. 1858), Sons and Daughters of Ham (est. 1867), and Sycamore (est. circa 1879). Though they are part of and owned by the city of Richmond today, the cemeteries were originally in Henrico County, and privately owned.
- Oakwood Cemetery was established in 1854 by the city of Richmond. It is a cemetery which included segregated African American sections. The first people buried in Oakwood in 1855 were African American. Though very few African American burials occurred there until the Shockoe Hill African Burying Ground was closed in June 1879.
- Mount Olivet Cemetery was originally the segregated African American section of the Maury Cemetery, which was founded in Manchester, Virginia in 1874. When Manchester was annexed into the city of Richmond in 1910, the city granted a petition of two residents to change the name of the "colored section" of the cemetery to Mount Olivet. It is now known as the "Maury and Mount Olivet Cemeteries."
- St. Joseph's Cemetery formerly called Bishop's Cemetery, in about 1884 it became a cemetery of African American Catholics. In 1971 it was sold to the Richmond Redevelopment and Housing Authority for use as a playground at Whitcomb Court. Seventy One graves were excavated and re-interred in Holy Cross and Mount Calvary Cemeteries.
- Evergreen Cemetery was founded in 1891 and owned by the Evergreen Cemetery Association. The Enrichmond Foundation (now defunct) acquired Evergreen Cemetery in 2017. The city of Richmond acquire Evergreen Cemetery in 2024.
- East End Cemetery was formed in 1897, by the East End Memorial Burial Association. It is located partially in the city of Richmond a partially in Henrico County. East End was acquired by the Enrichmond Foundation (now defunct) in 2019. The city of Richmond acquire ownership of East End Cemetery in 2024.
- Colored Paupers Cemetery (a.k.a. The Garden of Lilie's) established in 1896 by the city of Richmond, on land adjoining the city's Oakwood Cemetery.
- Woodland Cemetery was acquired in 1916 and opened in 1917, by the Richmond Planet newspaper editor John Mitchell. It is currently owned by Marvin Harris, founder of the Woodland Cemetery Restoration Foundation.

== City of Richmond Cemeteries Division of the Department of Parks ==
The City of Richmond's Department of Parks oversees the Richmond Cemeteries Division, which manages several cemeteries within the city. The division's oversight of African American burial grounds has included those owned by the city, such as the now-inactive Barton Heights Cemeteries and Mount Olivet Cemetery. Oakwood Cemetery, however, remains open for burials.

In 2024, the city acquired ownership of Evergreen Cemetery and East End Cemetery, bringing both under the oversight of the Richmond Cemeteries Division.

The city also manages a 1.2-acre portion of the Shockoe Hill African Burying Ground, reacquired in 2021. This site, along with the Shockoe Bottom African Burial Ground, were originally municipal burial grounds for African Americans. However, they were later repurposed and their land distributed, leading to desecration and erasure from historical recognition. Recent advocacy has contributed to their rediscovery and re-acknowledgment. The city's reacquisition of portions of these grounds is part of the Shockoe Project, an initiative aimed at memorializing these sites. The Shockoe Hill African Burying Ground was listed by Preservation Virginia in 2021 as one of Virginia's Most Endangered Historic Places. While the 1.2-acre parcel acquired by the city in April 2021 was officially established as a cemetery in November 2024 by City Council Ordinance 2024-283, the remaining approximately 30 acres are under various ownerships and are viewed by some as threatened by development. The Federal Railroad Administration (FRA) determined that the planned DC2RVA high-speed rail project would have an adverse effect on the Shockoe Hill African Burying Ground, and the Virginia Department of Historic Resources (DHR) concurred with this determination.

Neither Shockoe Bottom African Burial Ground nor Shockoe Hill African Burying Ground were officially designated as cemeteries, meaning they were not under the oversight of the Cemeteries Division. The Shockoe Bottom African Burial Ground is zoned light industrial, with a section beneath I-95. Shockoe Hill African Burying Ground is fragmented with diverse zoning that includes areas classified as both light and heavy industrial, and is traversed by roads, I-64, and railroad tracks. Ordinance 2024-283 provides formal recognition of a small portion of the Shockoe Hill African Burying Ground as a cemetery.

== East Marshall Street Well ==
The East Marshall Street Well at Virginia Commonwealth University (VCU) is a site containing human remains related to past medical practices, serving as a place of interment due to its history and the presence of human remains. Research indicates that in the 19th century, VCU's Medical College (formerly the Medical College of Virginia) obtained cadavers for anatomy instruction, which included the illegal practice of body snatching. The bodies were reportedly stolen from various locations, with **the Shockoe Hill African Burying Ground identified as a significant source**. These remains, primarily of African descent, were used for dissection and anatomical study. Accounts indicate that after being used in anatomy classes, the remains were discarded in a well, which was later capped around 1860. The well was rediscovered in April 1994 during construction of the Kontos Building on the VCU campus.

VCU has undertaken memorialization efforts to honor the people whose remains were found in the well. This includes the installation of commemorative panels at the Hermes A. Kontos Medical Sciences Building detailing the history of the discovery and the individuals involved.

== Freedmen's Bureau, "New Negro Cemetery" at Chimborazo Hospital ==
The Freedmen's Bureau established a cemetery at Chimborazo Hill (circa 1865), "for the convenience of the Negro colony settled at Chimborazo Hospital". It was reported on 2/10/1866 in the Richmond Examiner that two or three hundred were buried there by that time.

== Old Baptist Church Burying Ground ==
The Old Baptist Church Burying Ground was physically connected to the old Baptist Church meeting house at its original location on the north side of Cary St. between 2nd St. and 3rd St. The old Baptist Church now known as First Baptist Church, first organized as the Richmond Baptist Church, and was established in 1780. The burying ground was described as "being a piece of unenclosed wooded land, a kind of potters' field attached to the old Baptist church and used principally for the burial of Negroes." It was also said to have been the burial place of Gabriel and others of his followers who were executed at the usual place for their participation in the planned slave insurrection of 1800. In 1800 the usual place of execution in Richmond was on Gallows Hill near Canal St. at 1st St., a few blocks away from the old Baptist Church. Over time the usual place of execution was moved. After 1806 the gallows were located at the Burial Ground for Negroes in Shockoe Bottom. By 1816 it was moved to the Shockoe Hill African Burying Ground.

Human bones were discovered during excavation of the foundation for the new residence of Capt. John A. Coke's house in 1871. According to another source, "tombstones protruded from the ground at 2nd and Cary before 1861." Coke's house was constructed within plot (#659), which was located on the northwestern corner of Cary St. at 3rd St. The plot was previously owned by the Baptist Church. A newspaper article gave speculation that the bones uncovered could have belonged to Gabriel, Solomon and Peter, as well as others who were executed nearby for their involvement in the slave insurrection. It was indicated that after being executed, they were buried in the burial ground connected to the old Baptist Church. (Note: While the 1871 Daily Dispatch account is a primary source for the physical discovery of remains at this location, modern scholars and preservationists note that Reconstruction-era press accounts often utilized speculative narratives and racial stereotypes when reporting on Black historical figures.)
