= Joca =

Joca may refer to:

== Footballers ==
- Joca (footballer, born 1981), full name Ricardo Jorge da Silva Pinto Pereira, Portuguese former football midfielder
- Joca (footballer, born 1995), full name João Carlos Almeida Leandro, Portuguese football defender
- Joca (footballer, born 1996), full name Jorge Samuel Figueiredo Fernandes, Portuguese football midfielder

== Places ==
- Joca Marques, a municipality in the state of Piauí, Brazil
- Joca Claudino, a municipality in the state of Paraíba, Brazil
