= September 13 =

September 13 this year in various calendars
- Sunday, 13 September 2026
Akan	Monokwasi
Armenian	25 Hoṙi 1476
Aztec	Tititl 6, 13 Ocēlōtl
Babylonian	30 Abu, 2337 SE
Balinese pawukon	Menga, Kajeng, Menala, Pon, Maulu, Redite of Parangbakat, Uma, Erangan, Suka
Bengali	29 Bhadro, BS 1433
Chinese	Yang Metal Tiger・Star Mansion; Fire Horse Year, Month 8, Day 3 (Bailu, 10 days until Qiufen)
Common Era	13 September 2026 CE
Coptic	3 Thout, AM 1743
Egyptian	30 Tybi, 2775 NE
Ethiopian	3 Maskaram, 2019 Amätä Məhrät
French Republican	Décade III, Septidi de Fructidor de l'Année 234 de la République
Gregorian	13 September, AD 2026
Hebrew	2 Tishrei, AM 5787
Hindu	Hasta・Śukla; Solar: 28 Bhādrapada, 1948 SE; Lunisolar: Dvitīyā, Śukla pakṣa of Bhādrapada, 2083 VE; Rāudra・5127 KY・1,872,831
Icelandic	Sunnudagur, 20 Tvímánuður 2026
Islamic	30 Rabi' al-awwal, AH 1448 (using tabular method)
ISO week date	2026-W37-7
Japanese	3 Hazuki, Reiwa 8 (Hakuro, 10 days until Shūbun)
Julian	31 August, AD 2026 (AM 7534)
Julian day	2461297
Korean	3 Dakdal, 4359 DE
Maya	13.0.13.16.14; 7 Chen, 13 Ix
Roman	Pridie Kalendas Septembres, MMDCCLXXIX AUC
Solar Hijri	22 Shahrivar, SH 1405
Tibetan	2 khrums, me pho rta 2153 or 1772 or 1000

<<	September					>>
Su	Mo	Tu	We	Th	Fr	Sa
		1	2	3	4	5
6	7	8	9	10	11	12
13	14	15	16	17	18	19
20	21	22	23	24	25	26
27	28	29	30
2026

September 13 in recent years
2026 (Sunday)
2025 (Saturday)
2024 (Friday)
2023 (Wednesday)
2022 (Tuesday)
2021 (Monday)
2020 (Sunday)
2019 (Friday)
2018 (Thursday)
2017 (Wednesday)

September 13 is the 256th day of the year (257th in leap years) in the Gregorian calendar; 109 days remain until the end of the year.

== Events ==
=== Pre-1600 ===
- 585 BC – Lucius Tarquinius Priscus, king of Rome, celebrates a triumph for his victories over the Sabines, and the surrender of Collatia.
- 509 BC – The Temple of Jupiter Optimus Maximus on Rome's Capitoline Hill is dedicated on the ides of September.
- 531 – Khosrow I becomes king of the Sassanid Empire following the death of his father Kavad I. He starts negotiations with the Byzantine Empire to end the Iberian War.
- 533 – Belisarius of the Byzantine Empire defeats Gelimer and the Vandals at the Battle of Ad Decimum, near Carthage, North Africa.
- 604 – Consecration of pope Sabinian following the death of pope Gregory I earlier that year.
- 1229 – Ögedei Khan is proclaimed Khagan of the Mongol Empire in Kodoe Aral, Khentii: Mongolia.
- 1437 – Battle of Tangier: a Portuguese expeditionary force initiates a failed attempt to seize the Moroccan citadel of Tangier.
- 1500 – Pedro Álvares Cabral and his Portuguese fleet arrive in Calicut, having crossed both the Atlantic and Indian Ocean.

=== 1601–1900 ===
- 1609 – Henry Hudson reaches the river that would later be named after him – the Hudson River.
- 1645 – Wars of the Three Kingdoms: Scottish Royalists are defeated by Covenanters at the Battle of Philiphaugh.
- 1743 – Great Britain, Austria and the Kingdom of Sardinia sign the Treaty of Worms.
- 1759 – Battle of the Plains of Abraham: the British defeat the French near Quebec City in the Seven Years' War, known in the United States as the French and Indian War.
- 1782 – American Revolutionary War: Franco-Spanish troops launch the unsuccessful "grand assault" during the Great Siege of Gibraltar.
- 1788 – The Congress of the Confederation sets the date for the first presidential election in the United States, and New York City becomes the country's temporary capital.
- 1791 – King Louis XVI accepts the new French constitution.
- 1807 – Beethoven's Mass in C major, Op. 86, is premiered, commissioned by Nikolaus I, Prince Esterházy, and displeasing him.
- 1808 – Finnish War: In the Battle of Jutas, Swedish forces under Lieutenant General Georg Carl von Döbeln beat the Russians, making von Döbeln a Swedish war hero.
- 1812 – War of 1812: A supply wagon sent to relieve Fort Harrison is ambushed in the Attack at the Narrows.
- 1814 – In a turning point in the War of 1812, the British fail to capture Baltimore. During the battle, Francis Scott Key composes his poem "Defence of Fort McHenry", which is later set to music and becomes the United States' national anthem.
- 1843 – The Greek Army rebels (OS date: September 3) against the autocratic rule of king Otto of Greece, demanding the granting of a constitution.
- 1847 – Mexican–American War: Six teenage military cadets known as Niños Héroes die defending Chapultepec Castle in the Battle of Chapultepec. American troops under General Winfield Scott capture Mexico City in the Mexican–American War.
- 1848 – Vermont railroad worker Phineas Gage survives an iron rod 1 1/4 inches (3.2 cm) in diameter being driven through his brain; the reported effects on his behavior and personality stimulate discussion of the nature of the brain and its functions.
- 1862 – American Civil War: Union soldiers find a copy of Robert E. Lee's battle plans in a field outside Frederick, Maryland. It is the prelude to the Battle of Antietam.
- 1880 – The Basuto Gun War breaks out after the Basuto launch a rebellion against the Cape Colony.
- 1882 – Anglo-Egyptian War: English forces defeat the Egyptian army in the battle of Tel el-Kebir.
- 1898 – Hannibal Goodwin patents celluloid photographic film.
- 1899 – Mackinder, Ollier and Brocherel make the first ascent of Batian (5,199 m – 17,058 ft), the highest peak of Mount Kenya.
- 1900 – Filipino insurgents defeat a small American column in the Battle of Pulang Lupa, during the Philippine–American War.

=== 1901–present ===
- 1906 – The Santos-Dumont 14-bis makes a short hop, the first flight of a fixed-wing aircraft in Europe.
- 1922 – The final act of the Greco-Turkish War, the Great Fire of Smyrna, commences.
- 1923 – Following a military coup in Spain, Miguel Primo de Rivera takes over, setting up a dictatorship.
- 1933 – Elizabeth McCombs becomes the first woman elected to the New Zealand Parliament.
- 1942 – World War II: Second day of the Battle of Edson's Ridge in the Guadalcanal Campaign. U.S. Marines successfully defeat attacks by the Japanese with heavy losses for the Japanese forces.
- 1944 – World War II: Start of the Battle of Meligalas between the Greek Resistance forces of the Greek People's Liberation Army (ELAS) and the collaborationist security battalions.
- 1948 – Deputy Prime Minister of India Vallabhbhai Patel orders the Army to move into Hyderabad to integrate it with the Indian Union.
- 1948 – Margaret Chase Smith is elected United States senator, and becomes the first woman to serve in both the U.S. House of Representatives and the United States Senate.
- 1953 – Nikita Khrushchev is appointed General Secretary of the Communist Party of the Soviet Union.
- 1956 – The IBM 305 RAMAC is introduced, the first commercial computer to use disk storage.
- 1956 – The dike around the Dutch polder East Flevoland is closed.
- 1962 – An appeals court orders the University of Mississippi to admit James Meredith, the first African-American student admitted to the segregated university.
- 1964 – South Vietnamese Generals Lâm Văn Phát and Dương Văn Đức fail in a coup attempt against General Nguyễn Khánh.
- 1964 – Martin Luther King Jr. addresses a crowd of 20,000 West Berliners on Sunday, in Waldbühne.
- 1968 – Cold War: Albania leaves the Warsaw Pact.
- 1971 – State police and National Guardsmen storm New York's Attica Prison to quell a prison revolt, which claimed 43 lives.
- 1971 – Chairman Mao Zedong's second in command and successor Marshal Lin Biao flees China after the failure of an alleged coup. His plane crashes in Mongolia, killing all aboard.
- 1979 – South Africa grants independence to the "homeland" of Venda (not recognised outside South Africa).
- 1982 – Spantax Flight 995 crashes at Málaga Airport during a rejected takeoff, killing 50 of the 394 people on board.
- 1985 – Super Mario Bros. is released in Japan for the NES, which starts the Super Mario series of platforming games.
- 1986 – A magnitude 6.0 earthquake strikes Kalamata, Greece with a maximum Modified Mercalli intensity of X (Extreme), killing at least 20 and causing heavy damage in the city.
- 1987 – Goiânia accident: A radioactive object is stolen from an abandoned hospital in Goiânia, Brazil, contaminating many people in the following weeks and causing some to die from radiation poisoning.
- 1988 – Hurricane Gilbert is the strongest recorded hurricane in the Western Hemisphere, later replaced by Hurricane Wilma in 2005 (based on barometric pressure).
- 1989 – Largest anti-Apartheid march in South Africa, led by Desmond Tutu.
- 1993 – Israeli Prime Minister Yitzhak Rabin shakes hands with Palestine Liberation Organization chairman Yasser Arafat at the White House after signing the Oslo Accords granting limited Palestinian autonomy.
- 1997 – A German Air Force Tupolev Tu-154 and a United States Air Force Lockheed C-141 Starlifter collide in mid-air near Namibia, killing 33.
- 2001 – Civilian aircraft traffic resumes in the United States after the September 11 attacks.
- 2007 – The Declaration on the Rights of Indigenous Peoples is adopted by the United Nations General Assembly.
- 2007 – The McLaren F1 team are found guilty of possessing confidential information from the Ferrari team, fined $100 million, and excluded from the constructors' championship standings.
- 2008 – Delhi, India, is hit by a series of bomb blasts, resulting in 30 deaths and 130 injuries.
- 2013 – Taliban insurgents attack the United States consulate in Herat, Afghanistan, with two members of the Afghan National Police reported dead and about 20 civilians injured.

== Births ==
=== Pre-1600 ===
- AD 64 – Julia Flavia, Roman daughter of Titus (died AD 91)
- 678 – Kʼinich Ahkal Moʼ Nahb III, Mayan ruler (died 730)
- 1087 – John II Komnenos, Byzantine emperor (died 1143)
- 1373 – Minkhaung I, King of Ava (died 1431)
- 1475 – Cesare Borgia, Italian cardinal (died 1507)
- 1502 – John Leland, English poet and historian (died 1552)
- 1521 – William Cecil, 1st Baron Burghley, English academic and politician, Lord High Treasurer (died 1598)
- 1594 – Francesco Manelli, Italian theorbo player and composer (died 1667)

=== 1601–1900 ===
- 1604 – Sir William Brereton, 1st Baronet, English commander and politician (died 1661)
- 1755 – Oliver Evans, American inventor, engineer and businessman (died 1819)
- 1802 – Arnold Ruge, German philosopher and author (died 1880)
- 1813 – John Sedgwick, American general and educator (died 1864)
- 1818 – Lucy Goode Brooks, Former American slave and a founder of Friends' Asylum for Colored Orphans (died 1900)
- 1819 – Clara Schumann, German pianist and composer (died 1896)
- 1830 – Marie von Ebner-Eschenbach, Austrian author (died 1916)
- 1842 – John H. Bankhead, American soldier and politician (died 1920)
- 1851 – Walter Reed, American physician and biologist (died 1902)
- 1857 – Michał Drzymała, Polish rebel and activist (died 1937)
- 1857 – Milton S. Hershey, American businessman, founded The Hershey Company (died 1945)
- 1860 – John J. Pershing, American general and lawyer (died 1948)
- 1865 – William Birdwood, Indian-English field marshal (died 1951)
- 1872 – Kijūrō Shidehara, Japanese politician and diplomat, 44th Prime Minister of Japan (died 1951)
- 1873 – Constantin Carathéodory, German mathematician and author (died 1950)
- 1874 – Henry F. Ashurst, American lawyer and politician (died 1962)
- 1874 – Arnold Schoenberg, Austrian composer and painter (died 1951)
- 1876 – Sherwood Anderson, American novelist and short story writer (died 1941)
- 1877 – Wilhelm Filchner, German-Swiss explorer (died 1957)
- 1877 – Stanley Lord, English captain (died 1962)
- 1879 – Annie Kenney, leading British suffragette (died 1953)
- 1880 – Jesse L. Lasky, American film producer, co-founded Famous Players–Lasky (died 1958)
- 1882 – Ramón Grau, Cuban physician and politician, 6th President of Cuba (died 1969)
- 1883 – LeRoy Samse, American pole vaulter (died 1956)
- 1883 – Petros Voulgaris, Greek admiral and politician, 136th Prime Minister of Greece (died 1957)
- 1885 – Wilhelm Blaschke, Austrian-German mathematician and academic (died 1962)
- 1886 – Amelie Beese, German pilot and sculptor (died 1925)
- 1886 – Robert Robinson, English chemist and academic, Nobel Prize laureate (died 1975)
- 1887 – Leopold Ružička, Croatian-Swiss biochemist and academic, Nobel Prize laureate (died 1976)
- 1890 – Antony Noghès, French-Monegasque businessman, founded the Monaco Grand Prix (died 1978)
- 1891 – Max Pruss, German captain and pilot (died 1960)
- 1893 – Larry Shields, American clarinet player (died 1953)
- 1894 – J. B. Priestley, English novelist and playwright (died 1984)
- 1894 – Julian Tuwim, Polish poet, playwright, and director (died 1953)
- 1895 – Morris Kirksey, American rugby player and sprinter (died 1981)
- 1898 – Roger Désormière, French conductor and composer (died 1963)
- 1898 – C. Sittampalam, Sri Lankan lawyer and politician (died 1964)
- 1899 – Corneliu Zelea Codreanu, Romanian politician (died 1938)

=== 1901–present ===
- 1903 – Claudette Colbert, American actress (died 1996)
- 1904 – Alberta Williams King, American civil rights organizer, mother of Martin Luther King, Jr. (died 1974)
- 1904 – Gladys George, American actress (died 1954)
- 1908 – Chu Berry, American saxophonist (died 1941)
- 1908 – Karolos Koun, Greek director and playwright (died 1987)
- 1908 – Sicco Mansholt, Dutch farmer and politician, 4th President of the European Commission (died 1995)
- 1908 – Mae Questel, American actress and vocal artist (died 1998)
- 1909 – Ray Bowden, English footballer (died 1998)
- 1909 – Frits Thors, Dutch journalist and radio host (died 2014)
- 1911 – Bill Monroe, American singer-songwriter and mandolin player (died 1996)
- 1912 – Maurice K. Goddard, American colonel and politician (died 1995)
- 1912 – Reta Shaw, American actress (died 1982)
- 1913 – Kai Setälä, Finnish physician and professor (died 2005)
- 1914 – Leonard Feather, English-American pianist, composer, producer, and journalist (died 1994)
- 1916 – Roald Dahl, British novelist, poet, and screenwriter (died 1990)
- 1917 – Carol Kendall, American historian and author (died 2012)
- 1917 – Robert Ward, American soldier, composer, and educator (died 2013)
- 1918 – Ray Charles, American singer-songwriter and conductor (died 2015)
- 1918 – Dick Haymes, Argentinian actor and singer (died 1980)
- 1919 – Mary Midgley, English philosopher and author (died 2018)
- 1919 – George Weidenfeld, Baron Weidenfeld, Austrian-English journalist, publisher, and philanthropist (died 2016)
- 1920 – Else Holmelund Minarik, Danish-American journalist and author (died 2012)
- 1922 – Charles Brown, American singer and pianist (died 1999)
- 1922 – Caroline Duby Glassman, American lawyer and jurist (died 2013)
- 1923 – Édouard Boubat, French photographer and journalist (died 1999)
- 1924 – Harold Blair, Australian tenor and educator (died 1976)
- 1924 – Scott Brady, American actor (died 1985)
- 1924 – Maurice Jarre, French composer and conductor (died 2009)
- 1925 – Mel Tormé, American singer-songwriter and actor (died 1999)
- 1926 – Andrew Brimmer, American economist and academic (died 2012)
- 1926 – Emile Francis, Canadian ice hockey player, coach, and manager (died 2022)
- 1926 – J. Frank Raley Jr., American soldier and politician (died 2012)
- 1928 – Robert Indiana, American painter and sculptor (died 2018)
- 1928 – Tzannis Tzannetakis, Greek soldier and politician, 175th Prime Minister of Greece (died 2010)
- 1930 – Robert Gavron, Baron Gavron, English publisher and philanthropist (died 2015)
- 1931 – Barbara Bain, American actress
- 1931 – Robert Bédard, Canadian tennis player and sportscaster
- 1931 – Marjorie Jackson-Nelson, Australian sprinter and politician, 33rd Governor of South Australia
- 1931 – Rein Maran, Estonian cinematographer
- 1932 – Fernando González Pacheco, Spanish-Colombian journalist and actor (died 2014)
- 1932 – Radoslav Brzobohatý, Czech actor (died 2012)
- 1932 – Bengt Hallberg, Swedish pianist and composer (died 2013)
- 1933 – Eileen Fulton, American actress (died 2025)
- 1933 – Donald Mackay, Australian businessman and activist (died 1977)
- 1933 – Lewie Steinberg, American bass player (died 2016)
- 1934 – Tony Pickard, English tennis player and coach
- 1936 – Stefano Delle Chiaie, Italian activist, founded National Vanguard (died 2019)
- 1937 – Don Bluth, American animator, director, and producer, co-founded Sullivan Bluth Studios and Fox Animation Studios
- 1938 – John Smith, Scottish lawyer and politician, Shadow Chancellor of the Exchequer (died 1994)
- 1939 – Arleen Auger, American soprano and educator (died 1993)
- 1939 – Richard Kiel, American actor and voice artist (died 2014)
- 1939 – Guntis Ulmanis, Latvian economist and politician, 5th President of Latvia
- 1939 – Joel-Peter Witkin, American photographer
- 1940 – Óscar Arias, Costa Rican politician, President of Costa Rica, Nobel Prize laureate
- 1940 – Brian Brain, English cricketer (died 2023)
- 1940 – Kerry Stokes, Australian businessman
- 1941 – Tadao Ando, Japanese architect and academic, designed Piccadilly Gardens
- 1941 – David Clayton-Thomas, English-Canadian singer-songwriter and guitarist (died 2026)
- 1941 – Ahmet Necdet Sezer, Turkish judge and politician, 10th President of the Republic of Turkey
- 1942 – Michel Côté, Canadian businessman and politician
- 1943 – Mildred D. Taylor, American author
- 1944 – Carol Barnes, English journalist (died 2008)
- 1944 – Jacqueline Bisset, English actress and producer
- 1944 – Peter Cetera, American singer-songwriter, bass player, and producer
- 1944 – Midget Farrelly, Australian surfer (died 2016)
- 1945 – Noël Godin, Belgian actor, director, and screenwriter
- 1945 – Andres Küng, Swedish journalist and politician (died 2002)
- 1946 – Frank Marshall, American director and producer
- 1946 – Henri Kuprashvili, Georgian swimmer
- 1948 – Nell Carter, American actress and singer (died 2003)
- 1948 – Dimitri Nanopoulos, Greek physicist and academic
- 1948 – Sitiveni Rabuka, Fijian general and politician, 3rd Prime Minister of Fiji
- 1949 – Jim Cleamons, American basketball player and coach
- 1949 – John W. Henry, American businessman
- 1950 – Włodzimierz Cimoszewicz, Polish lawyer and politician, 8th Prime Minister of Poland
- 1950 – Christine Estabrook, American actress
- 1950 – Pat Holland, English footballer and manager
- 1950 – Jeff Lowe, American mountaineer (died 2018)
- 1951 – Anne Devlin, Irish author, playwright, and screenwriter
- 1951 – Salva Kiir, South Sudanese politician, 1st President of South Sudan
- 1951 – Jean Smart, American actress
- 1952 – Réjean Giroux, Canadian ice hockey player
- 1952 – Randy Jones, American pop and disco singer
- 1952 – Don Was, American bass player and producer
- 1954 – Steve Kilbey, English-Australian singer-songwriter and bass player
- 1954 – Isiah Whitlock Jr., American actor (died 2025)
- 1955 – Colin Moynihan, 4th Baron Moynihan, English rower and politician, Minister for Sport and the Olympics
- 1955 – Joe Morris, American guitarist and composer
- 1956 – Alain Ducasse, French-Monégasque chef
- 1956 – Anne Geddes, Australian-New Zealand photographer and fashion designer
- 1956 – Martin Hurson, Irish Republican, died on hunger strike (died 1981)
- 1956 – Joni Sledge, American singer and songwriter (died 2017)
- 1957 – Vinny Appice, American rock drummer
- 1957 – Judy Blumberg, American ice dancer and sportscaster
- 1957 – Mal Donaghy, Northern Irish footballer and manager
- 1957 – Brad Hooker, English-American philosopher and academic
- 1957 – Eleanor King, English lawyer and judge
- 1957 – John G. Trueschler, American lawyer and politician
- 1957 – Mark Wiebe, American golfer
- 1957 – Keith Black, American neurosurgeon and academic
- 1957 – Bongbong Marcos, 17th President of the Philippines
- 1958 – Bobby Davro, English comedian and actor
- 1958 – Paweł Przytocki, Polish conductor and academic
- 1958 – Kōji Tamaki, Japanese singer-songwriter and actor
- 1959 – Tatyana Mitkova, Russian journalist
- 1960 – Kevin Carter, South African photojournalist (died 1994)
- 1960 – Bob Eggleton, American artist
- 1961 – Dave Mustaine, American singer-songwriter, guitarist, and producer
- 1961 – KK Null, Japanese singer-songwriter and guitarist
- 1961 – Peter Roskam, American lawyer and politician
- 1962 – Neal Lancaster, American golfer
- 1962 – Tõnu Õnnepalu, Estonian author
- 1963 – Yuri Alexandrov, Russian boxer (died 2013)
- 1963 – Antony Galione, English pharmacologist
- 1963 – Theodoros Roussopoulos, Greek journalist and politician
- 1963 – Robin Smith, South African-English cricketer (died 2025)
- 1964 – Tavis Smiley, American talk show host, journalist, and author
- 1965 – Annie Duke, American poker player and author
- 1965 – Jeff Ross, American comedian, director, and author
- 1965 – Zak Starkey, English drummer
- 1966 – Maria Furtwängler, German physician and actress
- 1966 – Brendan Hall, Australian rugby league player
- 1966 – Igor Kravchuk, Russian ice hockey player
- 1966 – Louis Mandylor, Australian actor
- 1967 – Michael Johnson, American former sprinter and journalist
- 1967 – Tim "Ripper" Owens, American singer-songwriter and guitarist
- 1967 – Stephen Perkins, American drummer and songwriter
- 1968 – Brad Johnson, American football player
- 1968 – Bernie Williams, Puerto Rican-American baseball player and guitarist
- 1969 – Daniel Fonseca, Uruguayan footballer
- 1969 – Dominic Fumusa, American actor
- 1969 – Tyler Perry, American actor, director, producer, and screenwriter
- 1969 – Shane Warne, Australian cricketer, coach, and sportscaster (died 2022)
- 1970 – Lee Abramson, American bass player and composer (died 2016)
- 1970 – Martín Herrera, Argentinian footballer
- 1970 – Louise Lombard, English actress
- 1971 – Ben Alexander, Australian rugby league player (died 1992)
- 1971 – Goran Ivanišević, Croatian tennis player and coach
- 1971 – Stella McCartney, English fashion designer
- 1971 – Manabu Namiki, Japanese pianist and composer
- 1973 – Christine Arron, French runner
- 1973 – Fabio Cannavaro, Italian footballer and manager
- 1973 – Carlo Nash, English footballer and photographer
- 1974 – Travis Knight, American basketball player
- 1974 – Éric Lapointe, Canadian football player
- 1974 – Craig Rivet, Canadian ice hockey player
- 1975 – Akihiro Asai, Japanese race car driver
- 1975 – Joe Don Rooney, American singer-songwriter and guitarist
- 1975 – Idan Tal, Israeli footballer
- 1976 – Ro Khanna, American politician
- 1976 – Craig McMillan, New Zealand cricketer, coach, and sportscaster
- 1976 – Elvis Mihailenko, Latvian boxer, trainer, and sportscaster
- 1976 – José Théodore, Canadian ice hockey player and sportscaster
- 1976 – Puma Swede, Swedish pornographic actress
- 1977 – Fiona Apple, American singer-songwriter, producer, and pianist
- 1977 – Ivan De Battista, Maltese actor, singer, director, and producer
- 1977 – Daisuke Tsuda, Japanese singer-songwriter and drummer
- 1978 – Swizz Beatz, American rapper and producer
- 1978 – Peter Sunde, Swedish businessman
- 1978 – Masato Shibata, Japanese wrestler
- 1979 – Geike Arnaert, Belgian singer
- 1979 – Tony Henry, English footballer
- 1980 – Andreas Biermann, German footballer (died 2014)
- 1980 – Han Chae-young, South Korean actress
- 1980 – Daisuke Matsuzaka, Japanese baseball player
- 1980 – Evangelos Nastos, Greek footballer
- 1980 – Viren Rasquinha, Indian field hockey player
- 1980 – Ben Savage, American actor
- 1981 – Koldo Fernández, Spanish cyclist
- 1981 – Angelina Love, Canadian-American wrestler
- 1982 – Lloyd Dyer, English footballer
- 1982 – Nenê, Brazilian basketball player
- 1982 – Rickie Weeks, American baseball player
- 1982 – Colin Marston, American guitarist, bassist, and producer/engineer
- 1982 – Miha Zupan, Slovenian basketball player
- 1983 – James Bourne, English singer-songwriter, guitarist, and producer
- 1983 – Molly Crabapple, American illustrator and journalist
- 1983 – Ryan Del Monte, Canadian ice hockey player
- 1983 – Eduard Ratnikov, Estonian footballer
- 1984 – Nabil Abou-Harb, American director, producer, and screenwriter
- 1984 – Baron Corbin, American wrestler
- 1985 – David Jordan, English singer-songwriter
- 1985 – Tom Learoyd-Lahrs, Australian rugby league player
- 1986 – Steve Colpaert, Belgian footballer
- 1986 – Derek Hardman, American football player
- 1986 – Kamui Kobayashi, Japanese race car driver
- 1986 – Sean Williams, American basketball player
- 1987 – Edenilson Bergonsi, Brazilian footballer
- 1987 – Jonathan de Guzmán, Canadian-Dutch footballer
- 1987 – Luke Fitzgerald, Irish rugby player
- 1987 – Tsvetana Pironkova, Bulgarian tennis player
- 1988 – Luis Rentería, Panamanian footballer (died 2014)
- 1988 – Keith Treacy, Irish footballer
- 1989 – Elysée Irié Bi Séhi, Ivorian footballer
- 1989 – Kenny Edwards, New Zealand rugby league player
- 1989 – Jon Mannah, Australian rugby league player (died 2013)
- 1989 – Thomas Müller, German footballer
- 1989 – William Owusu, Ghanaian footballer
- 1990 – Craig Cunningham, Canadian ice hockey player
- 1990 – Aoi Nakabeppu, Japanese model and actress
- 1990 – Luciano Narsingh, Dutch footballer
- 1991 – Ksenia Afanasyeva, Russian gymnast
- 1992 – Darren Waller, American football player
- 1993 – Niall Horan, Irish singer
- 1993 – Alice Merton, Irish-Canadian singer and songwriter
- 1994 – Leonor Andrade, Portuguese singer
- 1994 – Anna Karolína Schmiedlová, Slovak tennis player
- 1994 – Cameron Munster, Australian rugby league player
- 1994 – Sepp Kuss, American professional cyclist
- 1995 – Joca, Portuguese footballer
- 1995 – Jerry Tollbring, Swedish handball player
- 1996 – Adrian Kempe, Swedish ice hockey player
- 1996 – Lili Reinhart, American actress
- 1998 – Satoshi, Moldovan rapper and singer-songwriter
- 1999 – Açucena, Brazilian politician
- 1999 – Yeonjun, South Korean singer, songwriter and dancer

== Deaths ==
=== Pre-1600 ===
- 81 – Titus, Roman emperor (born AD 39)
- 413 – Marcellinus of Carthage, martyr and saint
- 531 – Kavad I, Sasanian King of Kings of Iran (born 473)
- 864 – Pietro Tradonico, doge of Venice
- 908 – Cormac mac Cuilennáin, king of Munster (Ireland)
- 1171 – Al-Adid, last Fatimid caliph (born 1151)
- 1313 – Notburga, Austrian saint (born 1265)
- 1409 – Isabella of Valois, French princess, Queen Consort of England and Duchess of Orleans (born 1389)
- 1488 – Charles II, Duke of Bourbon (born 1434)
- 1506 – Andrea Mantegna, Italian painter and engraver (born 1431)
- 1557 – John Cheke, English scholar and politician, Secretary of State for England (born 1514)
- 1592 – Michel de Montaigne, French philosopher and author (born 1533)
- 1598 – Philip II of Spain, King of Spain, Portugal, England and Ireland (born 1526)

=== 1601–1900 ===
- 1612 – Karin Månsdotter, Queen of Sweden (born 1550)
- 1632 – Leopold V, Archduke of Austria (born 1586)
- 1759 – James Wolfe, English general (born 1727)
- 1766 – Benjamin Heath, English scholar and author (born 1704)
- 1800 – Claude Martin, French-English general and explorer (born 1735)
- 1806 – Charles James Fox, English soldier and politician, Secretary of State for Foreign and Commonwealth Affairs (born 1749)
- 1808 – Saverio Bettinelli, Italian poet, playwright, and critic (born 1718)
- 1813 – Hezqeyas, Ethiopian emperor
- 1847 – Nicolas Oudinot, French general (born 1767)
- 1871 – İbrahim Şinasi, Turkish journalist, author, and translator (born 1826)
- 1872 – Ludwig Feuerbach, German anthropologist and philosopher (born 1804)
- 1881 – Ambrose Burnside, American general and politician, 30th Governor of Rhode Island (born 1824)
- 1885 – Friedrich Kiel, German composer and educator (born 1821)
- 1894 – Emmanuel Chabrier, French pianist and composer (born 1841)

=== 1901–present ===
- 1905 – René Goblet, French lawyer and politician, 52nd Prime Minister of France (born 1828)
- 1910 – Rajanikanta Sen, Bangladeshi poet and composer (born 1865)
- 1912 – Joseph Furphy, Australian author and poet (born 1843)
- 1912 – Nogi Maresuke, Japanese general (born 1849)
- 1913 – Aurel Vlaicu, Romanian pilot and engineer (born 1882)
- 1915 – Andrew L. Harris, American general and politician, 44th Governor of Ohio (born 1835)
- 1918 – Frederic Crowninshield, American artist and author (born 1845)
- 1928 – Italo Svevo, Italian author and playwright (born 1861)
- 1929 – Jatindra Nath Das, Indian activist (born 1904)
- 1931 – Lili Elbe, Danish model and painter (born 1882)
- 1937 – David Robertson, Scottish rugby player and golfer (born 1869)
- 1941 – Elias Disney, Canadian-American farmer and businessman (born 1859)
- 1944 – W. Heath Robinson, English cartoonist (born 1872)
- 1946 – Amon Göth, Austrian captain and Nazi war criminal (born 1908)
- 1946 – Eugene Lanceray, Russian painter, sculptor, and illustrator (born 1875)
- 1946 – William Watt, Australian lawyer and politician, 24th Premier of Victoria (born 1871)
- 1949 – August Krogh, Danish physiologist and academic, Nobel Prize laureate (born 1874)
- 1953 – Mary Brewster Hazelton, American painter (born 1868)
- 1960 – Leó Weiner, Hungarian composer and educator (born 1885)
- 1967 – Mohammed bin Awad bin Laden, Yemeni-Saudi Arabian businessman, founded Saudi Binladin Group (born 1903)
- 1967 – Robert George, English air marshal and politician, 24th Governor of South Australia (born 1896)
- 1967 – Leonard Lord, English businessman (born 1896)
- 1971 – Lin Biao, Chinese general and politician, 2nd Vice Premier of the People's Republic of China (born 1907)
- 1973 – Betty Field, American actress (born 1913)
- 1973 – Sajjad Zaheer, Indian poet and philosopher (born 1905)
- 1975 – Mudicondan Venkatarama Iyer, Indian singer and musicologist (born 1897)
- 1976 – Armand Mondou, Canadian ice hockey player (born 1905)
- 1976 – Albert Tessier, Canadian priest, historian, and director (born 1895)
- 1977 – Leopold Stokowski, English conductor (born 1882)
- 1981 – William Loeb III, American publisher (born 1905)
- 1982 – Reed Crandall, American illustrator (born 1917)
- 1985 – Dane Rudhyar, French-American astrologer, composer, and author (born 1895)
- 1987 – Mervyn LeRoy, American actor, director, and producer (born 1900)
- 1991 – Robert Irving, English soldier and conductor (born 1913)
- 1991 – Metin Oktay, Turkish footballer and manager (born 1936)
- 1991 – Joe Pasternak, Hungarian-American production manager and producer (born 1901)
- 1993 – Carl Voss, American ice hockey player and referee (born 1907)
- 1996 – Tupac Shakur, American rapper, producer, and actor (born 1971)
- 1997 – Georges Guétary, Egyptian-French actor, singer, and dancer (born 1915)
- 1997 – Georgios Mitsibonas, Greek footballer (born 1962)
- 1998 – Necdet Calp, Turkish civil servant and politician (born 1922)
- 1998 – Harry Lumley, Canadian ice hockey player (born 1926)
- 1998 – Frank Renouf, New Zealand businessman (born 1918)
- 1998 – George Wallace, American sergeant, lawyer, and politician, 45th Governor of Alabama (born 1919)
- 1999 – Benjamin Bloom, American psychologist and academic (born 1913)
- 2000 – Betty Jeffrey, Australian nurse and author (born 1908)
- 2001 – Johnny Craig, American sailor and illustrator (born 1926)
- 2001 – Jaroslav Drobný, Czech-English ice hockey player and tennis player (born 1921)
- 2001 – Dorothy McGuire, American actress (born 1916)
- 2002 – George Stanley, Canadian soldier, historian, and author, designed the Flag of Canada (born 1907)
- 2003 – Frank O'Bannon, American publisher, lawyer, and politician, 47th Governor of Indiana (born 1930)
- 2004 – Luis E. Miramontes, Mexican chemist, co-invented the birth-control pill (born 1925)
- 2004 – Charlie Brandt, American serial killer (born 1957)
- 2005 – Toni Fritsch, Austrian footballer (born 1945)
- 2005 – Julio César Turbay Ayala, Colombian lawyer and politician, 25th President of Colombia (born 1916)
- 2006 – Ann Richards, American educator and politician, 45th Governor of Texas (born 1933)
- 2007 – Whakahuihui Vercoe, New Zealand archbishop (born 1928)
- 2009 – Paul Burke, American actor (born 1926)
- 2011 – Walter Bonatti, Italian mountaineer and journalist (born 1930)
- 2012 – William Duckworth, American composer and author (born 1943)
- 2012 – Peter Lougheed, Canadian football player, lawyer, and politician, 10th Premier of Alberta (born 1928)
- 2012 – Edgar Metcalfe, English-Australian actor and director (born 1933)
- 2012 – Ranganath Misra, Indian lawyer and jurist, 21st Chief Justice of India (born 1926)
- 2012 – Lehri, (Actual name:Safirullah Siddiqui), Pakistani comedian and an actor in the Urdu film industry of Pakistan (born 1929)
- 2013 – Olusegun Agagu, Nigerian politician, 15th Governor of Ondo State (born 1948)
- 2013 – Robert J. Behnke, American biologist and academic (born 1929)
- 2013 – Rick Casares, American football player (born 1931)
- 2013 – Luiz Gushiken, Brazilian trade union leader and politician (born 1950)
- 2014 – Benjamin Adekunle, Nigerian general (born 1936)
- 2014 – Helen Filarski, American baseball player (born 1924)
- 2014 – Milan Galić, Serbian footballer (born 1938)
- 2014 – Frank Torre, American baseball player and manager (born 1931)
- 2015 – Vivinho, Brazilian footballer (born 1961)
- 2015 – Erma Bergmann, American baseball player (born 1924)
- 2015 – Brian Close, English cricketer and coach (born 1931)
- 2015 – Moses Malone, American basketball player and sportscaster (born 1955)
- 2016 – Jonathan Riley-Smith, British historian (born 1938)
- 2017 – Pete Domenici, American politician, senator of New Mexico (born 1932)
- 2019 – Eddie Money, American musician (born 1949)
- 2022 – Jean-Luc Godard, French-Swiss film director, screenwriter, and film critic (born 1930)
- 2024 – Wolfgang Gerhardt, German politician (born 1943)
- 2024 – Pravin Gordhan, South African politician (born 1949)
- 2024 – Lex Marinos, Australian actor (born 1949)
- 2024 – Mary McFadden, American fashion designer (born 1938)

== Holidays and observances ==
- Christian feast day:
  - Feast of the Cross (Assyrian Church of the East)
  - Aimé (Amatus)
  - Amé (Amatus) of Remiremont
  - John Chrysostom
  - Marcellinus of Carthage
  - Blessed María López de Rivas Martínez
  - Maurilius (Maurille) of Angers
  - Nectarius of Autun
  - Venerius the Hermit
  - Wulfthryth (Wilfrida) of Wilton
  - September 13 (Eastern Orthodox liturgics)
- Day of the Programmer, during a non-leap year. (Russia)
- Día de los Niños Héroes (Mexico)
- Engineer's Day (Mauritius)
- Roald Dahl Day (Africa, United Kingdom, Latin America)
