= Gabriel's Rebellion =

Slave rebellion in Virginia, United States (1800)

- Part of the Slave Revolts in North America
- Date: August 30, 1800
- Location: Henrico County, Virginia
- Goals: Emancipation
- Result: Discovered, suppressed

Parties
| Enslaved African-Americans | United States; Commonwealth of Virginia |

Lead figures
| Gabriel Prosser (executed) | John Adams; James Monroe |

Number
| Likely hundreds | |

Casualties and losses
| 70 arrested, 26 hanged | None |

Gabriel's Rebellion was a planned slave rebellion in the Richmond, Virginia, area in the summer of 1800. Information regarding the revolt was leaked before its execution, and Gabriel, an enslaved blacksmith who planned the event, and twenty-five of his followers were hanged.

Gabriel's planned uprising was notable not because of its results—the rebellion was quelled before it could begin—but because of its potential for mass chaos and widespread violence.

Afterward, Virginia and other state legislatures passed restrictions on free blacks, as well as prohibiting the education, assembly, and hiring of enslaved people, to restrict their ability and chances to plan similar rebellions.

== Gabriel ==
Gabriel (c. 1776 – October 10, 1800), referred to by some as Gabriel Prosser (though no historical records refer to him by that surname, the surname of his enslaver), was a man of African descent born into slavery in 1776 at Brookfield, a large tobacco plantation in Henrico County, Virginia. He and his two brothers, Solomon and Martin, were enslaved by Thomas Prosser, the owner of Brookfield. Gabriel was also literate. He was one of the rare 5% of enslaved people of the colonial era who were able to read and write.

Gabriel was trained as a blacksmith and a carpenter. His brother Solomon, and perhaps his father, were also blacksmiths. Gabriel, "hired out" by his enslaver to work in Richmond foundries, was able to keep a portion of the wages that he earned. The bulk of it went to Thomas Prosser. Gabriel traveled freely throughout Richmond and Henrico County to work for plantation and business owners.

Gabriel was married to Nanny (or Nan), an enslaved woman. They were not known to most historians as having had any children. Gabriel was described in newspaper articles as having stood "six feet two or three inches high." His long and "bony face, well made," was marred by losing his two front teeth and "two or three scars on his head." White people as well as black people regarded the literate young man as "a fellow of great courage and intellect above his rank in life."

In 1799, Gabriel, his brother Soloman, and a man named Jupiter tried to steal a pig from Absalom Johnson. Gabriel got into a scuffle with Johnson, and he bit off part of Johnson's ear. Jupiter was charged with stealing a hog, which was a misdemeanor, and Soloman was not charged. It was a capital offense for an enslaved person to assault a white person. He could have been hanged for the assault. Because he was a valuable bondsman for Prosser, the judge sentenced him to jail for one month and had his thumb branded. Gabriel was released from jail when enslaver Prosser paid a bond for his release, and he promised a year of good behavior. Richmond history professor and slave law expert Philip J. Schwarz states that it showed Gabriel's intention "to consciously challenge the system of slave control."

Historian Douglas R. Egerton, author of Gabriel's Rebellion, states: "He was physically big, he was literate, he's a fighter, he's a skilled artisan. For all these reasons, he was a natural leader."

== Background to the revolt ==
In Richmond, there were slightly more blacks than whites, with a total population of 5,700 in 1800. Richmond promoted slavery, with a community whipping post where enslavers had punishment meted out in a public square. Enslaved men loaded and moved flatboats of tobacco and other cargo. Throughout the state in 1800, 39.2% of the total population were enslaved; they were concentrated on plantations in the Tidewater region and west of Richmond.

Gabriel, living in Virginia in the late eighteenth century, was influenced by the prevailing themes of liberty expounded by the supporters of the American Revolution. During his lifetime, the number of free people of color had grown markedly in the Upper South. Many enslaved people were manumitted thanks in part to the efforts of Methodist and Quaker abolitionists. (Note: The percentage of free blacks as part of the black population rose from less than 1 percent in 1782 to more than 10 percent by 1810. By then, free blacks in Virginia numbered 30,466, or 7.2 percent of the black population. By 1810, nearly three-quarters of Delaware's black population were free.) Their number was augmented by free gens de couleur refugees from the Haitian Revolution, many of whom had been enslavers themselves. Some Virginia enslavers were nervous about the sharp increase in the number of free blacks in the slave state. (Note: They were uneasy as well by the violent aftermath of the French Revolution and the uprising of enslaved people in the 1790s in Saint Domingue. In 1792, France granted social equality to free people of color, and in 1793, French Revolutionary commissioners in Saint-Domingue granted freedom to all the enslaved people. Whites and free people of color, some of whom were also enslavers, emigrated as refugees to the US during the years of upheaval now known as the Haitian Revolution. They added to the free people of color in Charleston, Richmond, and New Orleans. In addition, enslavers brought thousands of ethnic enslaved Africans with them, especially adding to the African population of New Orleans. In 1804, the black and mulatto revolutionaries succeeded in gaining freedom, declaring the colony the independent black nation of Haiti.)

== Revolt and outcome ==
Some historians assert that Gabriel became the leader of the planned rebellion because he was highly intelligent, literate, and a blacksmith. Enslaved and free African-American men in Virginia taught their metalwork skills to their sons.

During the spring and summer of 1800, Gabriel began planning a revolt to end slavery in Virginia. Plans were made with enslaved people over ten counties and the cities of Richmond, Norfolk, and Petersburg, Virginia.

He, his brothers, and other blacksmiths turned scythe blades into as many as twelve dozen swords. Musket balls and 50 spears were created. They intended to steal muskets from a tavern. Hundreds of enslaved people from central Virginia (Note: No reliable numbers existed regarding enslaved and free black conspirators; most likely, the number of men actively involved numbered only several hundred.) expected to march into Richmond and take control of the Virginia State Armory and the Virginia State Capitol. The plan was to hold Virginia's Governor James Monroe hostage so that they could negotiate for their freedom.

But on August 30, 1800, the planned day of the attack, heavy rain flooded the streets of Richmond and the creeks in central Virginia. In addition, two enslaved people told their enslaver, Mosby Sheppard, about the plans. Sheppard warned Governor Monroe, who called out the state militia. They patrolled the area and began picking up conspirators. Gabriel escaped downriver to Norfolk, but he was spotted and betrayed there by another enslaved person named Will "Billy" King. More than 70 enslaved men were arrested by law enforcement for conspiracy and insurrection.

Gabriel was returned to Richmond for questioning, but he did not submit. The trial was heard by five justices in courts of oyer and terminer, rather than a jury. A recruit, Ben Woolfolk, testified that Gabriel intended on writing the words 'death or liberty' on a silk flag, referring to Patrick Henry's "Give me liberty or give me death!" speech of 1775. One of the enslaved men reportedly said, "I have nothing more to offer than what General Washington would have had to offer, had he been taken by the British and put to trial."

Gabriel, his two brothers, and 23 other enslaved people were hanged.

Enslaved people that were hanged
| # | Name | Date of hanging |
|---|---|---|
| 1 | Will | 12 September 1800 |
| 2 | John | 12 September 1800 |
| 3 | Isaac | 12 September 1800 |
| 4 | Michael | 12 September 1800 |
| 5 | Ned | 12 September 1800 |
| 6 | Solomon | 15 September 1800 |
| 7 | Billy | 15 September 1800 |
| 8 | Charles | 15 September 1800 |
| 9 | Frank | 15 September 1800 |
| 10 | Martin | 15 September 1800 |
| 11 | Sawney | 18 September 1800 |
| 12 | Peter | 18 September 1800 |
| 13 | Jupiter | 18 September 1800 |
| 14 | Sam | 18 September 1800 |
| 15 | Isham | 18 September 1800 |
| 16 | Gabriel | 10 October 1800 |
| 17 | Sam Byrd Jr. | 10 October 1800 |
| 18 | Isaac | 10 October 1800 |
| 19 | Laddis | 10 October 1800 |
| 20 | George | 10 October 1800 |
| 21 | Gilbert | 10 October 1800 |
| 22 | Tom | 10 October 1800 |
| 23 | Michael | 10 October 1800 |
| 24 | William | 10 October 1800 |
| 25 | Sam Graham | 10 October 1800 |
| 26 | Peter | 24 October 1800 |

One individual committed suicide before his arraignment. Eight enslaved men were moved or sold outside Virginia. Thirteen were found guilty but were pardoned by the governor. Twenty-five were acquitted. Two men received their freedom for informing their enslavers of the plot.

== Burial place ==
The site of Gabriel's execution and burial for several recent years, (since the rediscovery of the Shockoe Bottom African Burial Ground in the 1990s) was mistakenly believed to have been at the Shockoe Bottom African Burial Ground, historically known on the Richard Young 1809/1810 Plan of the city of Richmond as the Burial Ground for Negroes. His execution was advertised in 1800 as occurring at the usual place; however, until 1806, the "usual place" was not yet the location of the Burial Ground for Negroes in Shockoe Bottom.

The "usual place" of execution in 1800 was a place referred to as Gallows Hill near Canal St. at 1st St. The location of Gabriel's burial, as well as others who were executed on Gallows Hill for their involvement in the insurrection, was reported in the newspaper to have been the "Old Baptist Church Burying Ground", the burying ground connected to the old Baptist Church (originally organized as the Richmond Baptist Church) on Cary St., and was said to have been a sort of potters' field used primarily for the interment of black people. This burying ground at the old Baptist Church (First Baptist Church) was located on the northern side of Cary St. between 2nd St. and 3rd St., just a couple of blocks from the place of execution on Gallows Hill a little over a mile away from the Shockoe Bottom African Burying Ground. (Note: While the 1871 Daily Dispatch account is a primary source for the physical discovery of remains at this location, modern scholars and preservationists note that Reconstruction-era press accounts often utilized speculative narratives and racial stereotypes when reporting on Black historical figures.)

== Influence ==
The rebellion was reported in newspapers across the country. James Monroe and Thomas Jefferson were concerned about the optics of executing so many people. Jefferson said, "The other states & the world at large will forever condemn us if we indulge in a principle of revenge." The Federalists argued that the rebellion occurred as a result of the Democratic-Republican Party's support of the French Revolution.

Fears of servile insurrection regularly swept major slave-holding areas. After the rebellion, many enslavers significantly restricted their slaves' ability to travel after a second conspiracy was discovered in 1802 among enslaved boatmen along the Appomattox and Roanoke Rivers. New laws were enacted to restrict free blacks and slaves. The Virginia Assembly in 1802 made it illegal for free or enslaved Black people to obtain and pilot or navigate a boat. Two years later, they could not meet in groups after their work was done or on Sundays. In 1808, state legislators banned hiring out of enslaved people and required newly freed blacks to leave the state within 12 months or face re-enslavement. The growing population of free blacks had to petition the legislature to stay in the state.

== Historiography ==
The historian Douglas Egerton offered a new perspective on Gabriel in his book Gabriel's Rebellion: The Virginia Slave Conspiracies of 1800 & 1802 (1993). He based this on extensive primary research from surviving contemporary documents. Egerton concluded that Gabriel would have been stimulated and challenged at the foundries by interacting with European, African, and mixed-descent co-workers. They hoped Thomas Jefferson's Democratic-Republicans would liberate them from domination by the wealthy Federalist merchants of the city.

The internal dynamics of Jefferson's and Monroe's party in the 1800 United States presidential election were complex. A significant part of the Democratic-Republican base were prominent planters and colleagues of Thomas Jefferson and James Madison. Egerton believes that any sign that white radicals, particularly Frenchmen, had supported Gabriel's plan could have cost Jefferson the election. Enslavers feared such violent excesses as those related to the French Revolution after 1789 and the Haitian Revolution. Egerton believed that Gabriel planned to take Governor Monroe hostage to negotiate an end to slavery. Then, he planned to "drink and dine with the merchants of the city".

Egerton noted that Gabriel instructed his followers not to kill white Methodists, Quakers, and Frenchmen. During this period, Methodists and Quakers were active missionaries for manumission.

== Legacy ==
Gabriel's rebellion was an important example of enslaved people acting to gain freedom:

- In 2002, the City of Richmond adopted a resolution to commemorate the 202nd anniversary "of the execution of the patriot and freedom fighter, Gabriel, whose death stands as a symbol for the determination and struggle of slaves to obtain freedom, justice and equality as promised by the fundamental principles of democratic governments of the Commonwealth of Virginia and the United States of America".
- The Spring Park Historic Site in Henrico County commemorates Gabriel.
- In 2004, the Virginia Board of Historic Resources approved a historic highway marker at the spot where Gabriel was then believed to have been hanged on October 10, 1800. It is between 15th and 16th streets, on the north side of East Broad Street. The state worked with individuals from a group called the Defenders for Freedom, Justice & Equality.
- In the fall of 2006, the Virginia State Conference of the NAACP requested Gov. Tim Kaine pardon Gabriel in recognition of his contributions to the civil rights struggle of African Americans and all peoples.
- On August 30, 2007, Governor Kaine informally pardoned Gabriel and his co-conspirators. Kaine said that Gabriel's motivation had been "his devotion to the ideals of the American revolution—it was worth risking death to secure liberty." Kaine noted that "Gabriel's cause—the end of slavery and the furtherance of equality of all people—has prevailed in the light of history" and added that "it is important to acknowledge that history favorably regards Gabriel's cause while consigning legions who sought to keep him and others in chains to be forgotten."
- On August 30, 2026, an Historic Highway Marker titled "Gabriel's Uprising" was installed as a replacement to the 2004 "Gabriel's Execution" marker on E. Broad Street between 15th and 16th streets. The updated marker corrects historical inaccuracies regarding the location of Gabriel's execution and burial, noting that he was executed at Gallows' Hill and buried at the Old Baptist Church Burying Ground on Cary Street.

== In popular culture ==
- Arna Bontemps wrote Black Thunder (1936), a historical novel based on Gabriel's Rebellion.
- Gigi Amateau wrote Come August, Come Freedom: The Bellows, The Gallows, and The Black General Gabriel (2012), a historical fiction novel based on Gabriel's Rebellion.
- In Roots (1976), Alex Haley's historical fiction, the rebellion is heard of by the book's characters.
- In Sally Hemings, Barbara Chase-Riboud's 1979 novel about Hemings's relationship with Thomas Jefferson, Monroe writes Jefferson asking his advice on what to do about the insurrectionists still in jail after "(m)ore than thirty-five" had been executed. Hemings intercedes on their behalf, telling Jefferson, "I think there has been enough hanging," and suggests they be exiled instead. Although it is not made explicit in the novel, it is implied that Jefferson followed her suggestion and advised Monroe accordingly. At the end of the chapter, Hemings says, "I heard that the last of Gabriel's rebels had been reprieved and banished from Virginia by James Monroe. I had not pleaded in vain."
- Gabriel, the Musical was produced at the Firehouse Theatre in Richmond, Virginia, from September 8, 2022, through October 2, 2022. With libretto by Jerold Solomon, Foster Solomon and Ron Klipp, and music and lyrics by Klipp, the musical tells a semi-fictionalized account of the development of Gabriel's conspiracy and its aftermath on the conspirators, the local government, and the nation. The production was funded in part by a 2020 grant from the National Endowment for the Arts (grant 1861109–28–20).

=== Songs ===
- Tim Barry, a singer/songwriter from Richmond, wrote and performed "Prosser's Gabriel" for the album 28th & Stonewall. It chronicles the events of Gabriel's life, focusing on the attempted revolution.
- Gabriel is mentioned in Public Enemy's song "Prophets of Rage."
- Gabriel is the hero of a cleverly subversive (Note: '[the] song subverts...by exaggerating the reward and by foregrounding the extent of state repression aimed at a single man. This emphasizes White fear of slaves' potential power to ruin the state, rather than accenting the majesty of White power. This, then, was a song slaves could sing in front of Whites. It appeared to focus on exactly what authorities hoped slaves would remember about the conspiracy, but it did not accept a White version of the story. The song reversed the meaning...turning it into a tale of White anxiety rather than White power.') sea shanty recorded (Note: Although elsewhere in his fiction Marryat sometimes invents lyrics to songs, this is unlikely to be the case with the shanty about Gabriel. It refers to a rebellion over thirty years earlier and contains details that Marryat, as an Englishman, was unlikely to have known. Furthermore, he had sailed to North America in 1837, noting in his diary his interest in the shanties he repeatedly heard: "The seamen, as usual lightened their labour with the song and chorus...The one they sung was particularly musical, though not refined; and the chorus of 'Oh! Sally Brown', was given with great emphasis by the whole crew between every line of the song.") some forty years after the rebellion in Frederick Marryat's book, Poor Jack (1840). (Note: In the book an African American sailor sings the shanty. It refers to its subject as "General" Gabriel and claims a bounty of £1000 was put on his head. After being betrayed and captured, he is heavily loaded with chains, and "a troop of light horse" is appointed to guard him. He is taken before the governor, whose name is slightingly alluded to ("Monroe he set up for go[ver]nor"). The whole country turns out to see him. Gabriel makes a last speech in which he proclaims his own "right name" and that he is "here today and gone tomorrow / I did not come for to stay for e[v]er". He is taken to the gallows in a wagon drawn by four grey horses. Commenting with heavy irony that the execution was a "Very sad loss to Major Prosser" the verse concludes by describing Gabriel as the man "who almost ruined old Virginny".)

== See also ==
- Denmark Vesey
- History of slavery in Virginia
- List of enslaved people
- Nat Turner
- Slavery in the United States
