= Lucy Goode Brooks =

American slave and humanitarian (1818–1900)

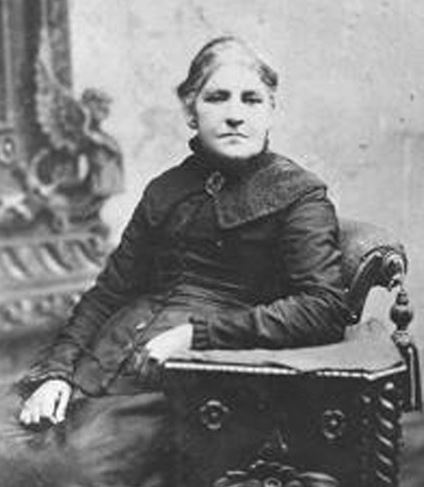
- Born: Lucy Goode; September 13, 1818; Virginia, U.S.
- Died: October 7, 1900 (aged 82); Richmond, Virginia, U.S.
- Known for: Founding the Friends' Asylum for Colored Orphans

Lucy Goode Brooks (September 13, 1818 – October 7, 1900) was an enslaved American woman who later became instrumental in the founding of the Friends' Asylum for Colored Orphans in Richmond, Virginia.

== Early life and education ==
Goode was born on September 13, 1818, in Virginia to the slave Judith Goode and a white man. She met another slave, Albert Royal Brooks, and taught him to read and write so that they could write passes to see each other. When her master died in 1838, she became the property of a man named Sublett. That same year, she joined the First Baptist Church of Richmond. Shortly after Goode became Sublett's property, he allowed her to marry Brooks on February 2, 1839, and allowed them to live together. Albert's owner allowed him to operate a livery stable, for which he collected rent, but also permitted Albert to keep his additional earnings and use them to buy his freedom. In 1841 when the Baptist church divided, she was one of the group that joined in forming the First African Baptist Church.

== Career ==
When Sublett died in 1858, his heirs threatened to sell Lucy and her children to different masters. She was able to negotiate with merchants who purchased her children and allowed them to live with her as long as they showed up for work daily. The sole exception was a daughter who was sold to owners in Tennessee. The knowledge that they could be separated made the Brookses work hard to try to buy the freedom of Lucy and the children. Her new master, Daniel Von Groning, who also owned her three youngest boys, allowed Albert to pay for their freedom in installments. It took four years, but on October 21, 1862, their deed of manumission was signed. The older three boys were not freed until the Civil War was ended.

The loss of her daughter and a previous son—who had been sold away as an infant—motivated Brooks to try to help children who were separated from their parents, after the war had ended. The Freedmen's Bureau initially offered temporary rations and care for abandoned children, but by the fall of 1865 increasingly tried to shift the burden to local relief efforts and benevolent societies. Brooks, who was a leader of the Ladies Sewing Circle for Charitable Work, convinced the other ladies to help organize an orphanage. She then gained the support of several churches, including the local Quaker congregation to help found the Friends' Asylum for Colored Orphans. The plan was approved and building's location was authorized by the city council in 1867, with the orphanage opening two years later. The organization is still operational and functions as the Friends Association for Children, though its current focus is to provide childcare and family support services to low- and moderate-income families.

Brooks died on October 7, 1900, in Richmond, Virginia, and she was buried in the Mechanic's Cemetery of Richmond. She was honored in 2008 by a Virginia Historical Marker being erected at the corner of Charity and Saint Paul Streets. A book about her life was published in 1989.

== Bibliography ==
- Brooks, Joseph K. (1989). A Brooks Chronicle: The Lives and Times of an African-American Family. Brooks Associates.
- Jones, Catherine A. (2015). Intimate Reconstructions: Children in Postemancipation Virginia. Charlottesville, Virginia: University of Virginia Press. ISBN 978-0-8139-3676-5.
- Rabinowitz, Howard N. (1994). Race, Ethnicity, and Urbanization: Selected Essays. University of Missouri Press. p. 80. ISBN 978-0-8262-0930-6.
