= Shockoe Valley =

- Historic Shockoe Valley
- U.S. National Register of Historic Places
- U.S. Historic district
- Virginia Landmarks Register
- Richmond City Historic District
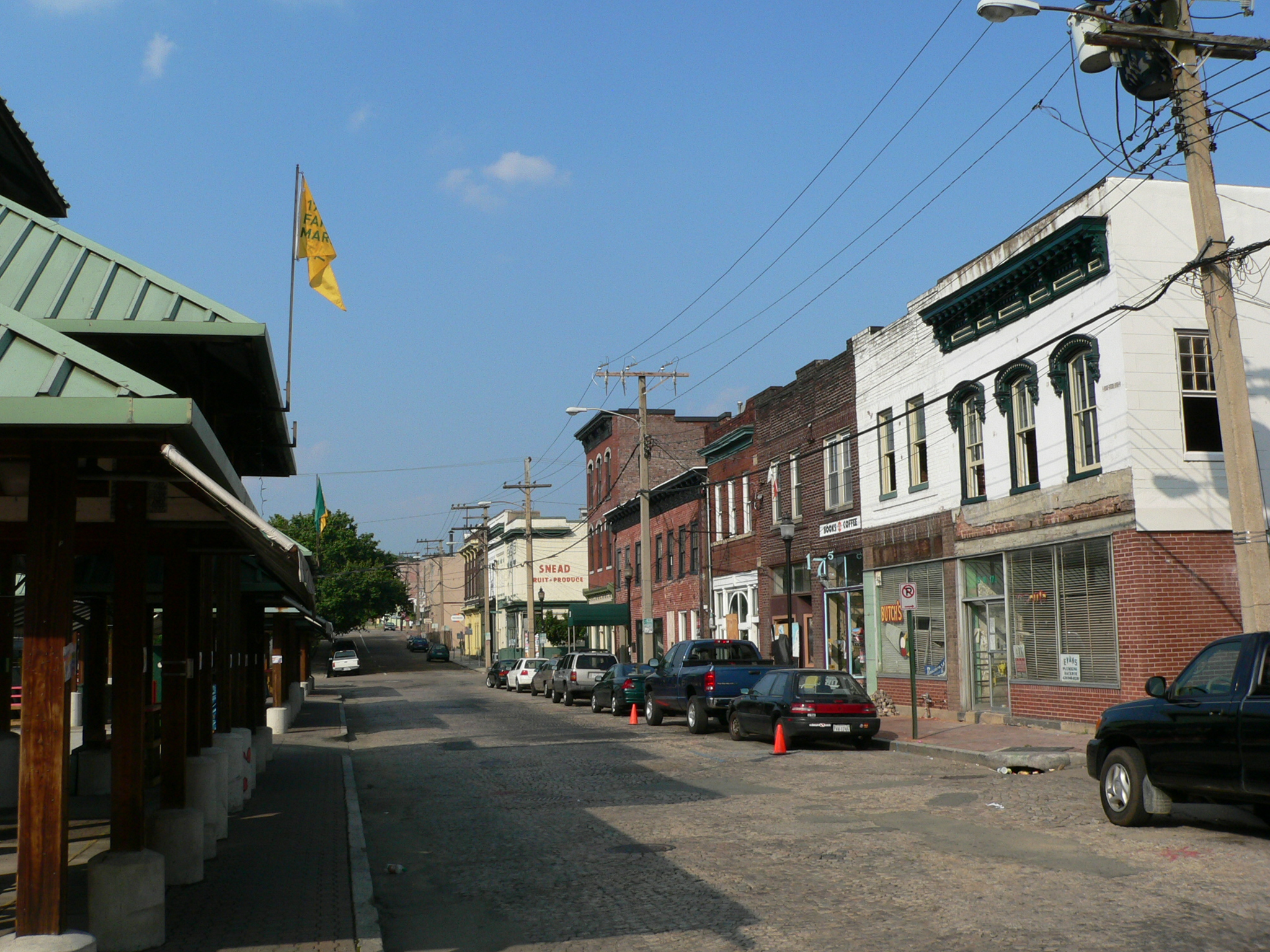
- View north on 17th Street

- Location within Virginia Location within the United States
- Location: Roughly bounded by the James River, 12th, Main, 14th, Broad, I-95, Clay, Cedar, Marshall, 21st, Franklin, 25th, Main, and Peach Sts., Richmond, Virginia
- Coordinates: 37°31′56″N 77°25′29″W
- Area: 129 acres (52 ha)
- Architectural style: Mid 19th Century Revival, Late 19th and 20th Century Revivals, Late Victorian
- NRHP reference No.: 83003308
- VLR No.: 127-0344

Significant dates
- Added to NRHP: February 24, 1983
- Designated VLR: July 21, 1981; August 23, 2007

Shockoe Valley is an area in Richmond, Virginia, just east of downtown, along the James River, and is the entertainment center of the city. Located between Shockoe Hill and Church Hill, Shockoe Valley contains much of the land included in Colonel William Mayo's 1737 plan of Richmond, making it one of the city's oldest neighborhoods. Shockoe Valley encompasses the smaller neighborhoods of Shockoe Slip, Shockoe Bottom and Tobacco Row along Cary Street.

== History ==
Shockoe Valley began developing in the late 18th century following the move of the state capital to Richmond, aided by the construction of Mayo's bridge across the James River (ultimately succeeded by the modern 14th Street Bridge), as well as the siting of key tobacco industry structures, such as the public warehouse, tobacco scales, and the Federal Customs House in or near the district.

On the eve of the fall of Richmond to the Union Army in April 1865, evacuating Confederate forces were ordered to set fire to the city's tobacco warehouses. The fires spread, and completely destroyed Shockoe Slip and several other districts. The district was quickly rebuilt in the late 1860s, flourishing further in the 1870s, and forming much of its present historic building stock.

Throughout the 19th Century, Shockoe Valley was the center of Richmond's commerce with ships pulling into port from the James River. Goods coming off these ships were warehoused and traded in Shockoe Valley.

Up until the end of the American Civil War in 1865, the area played a major role in the history of slavery in the United States, serving as the second largest slave trading center in the country, second to New Orleans. Profits from the trade in human beings fueled the creation of wealth for Southern whites and drove the economy in Richmond, leading 15th Street to be known as Wall Street in the antebellum period, with the surrounding blocks home to more than 69 slave dealers and auction houses. In 2006, archaeological excavations were begun on the former site of Lumpkin's Jail.

On the eve of the fall of Richmond to the Union Army in April 1865, evacuating Confederate forces were ordered to set fire to the city's tobacco warehouses. The fires spread, and completely destroyed Shockoe Slip and several other districts. The district was quickly rebuilt in the late 1860s, flourishing further in the 1870s, and forming much of its present historic building stock. Architecturally, many of the buildings were constructed during the rebuilding following the Evacuation Fire of 1865, especially in a commercial variant of the Italianate style, including a 1909 fountain, dedicated to "one who loved animals." The buildings in the district, which historically housed a variety of offices, wholesale and retail establishments, are now primarily restaurants, shops, offices, and apartments. It warehoused many of the city's goods, mostly tobacco. The district began declining in the 1920s, as other areas of the city rose in prominence with the advent of the automobile. Numerous structures would be demolished and cleared, including (in the 1950s), the Tobacco Exchange, which had been at the heart of the district. Up until they moved from Tobacco Row in the 1980s, the area was home to many of the country's largest tobacco companies.

== Redevelopment ==
Beginning in the 1960s and accelerating in the 1970s, Shockoe was redeveloped as a commercial and entertainment district; the nightlife district came just after Richmond passed liquor-by-the-drink laws, and when the so-called fern bar became popular across the United States. The restoration came at the time of an increased interest in historic preservation around the time of the Bicentennial, with the district being added to the National Register of Historic Places in 1972. Early pioneer restaurants included The Tobacco Company, Stuffy's Going Bananas, Commercial Cafe and Sam Miller's, the last two being revived restaurant names from Richmond's 19th century.

It became a major entertainment district in the last two decades of the 20th century. After centuries of periodic flooding by the James River, development was greatly stimulated by the completion of Richmond's James River Flood Wall and the Canal Walk in 1995. Ironically, the next flooding disaster came not from the river, but from Hurricane Gaston which brought extensive local tributary flooding along the basin of Shockoe Creek and did extensive damage to the area in 2004, with businesses being shut down and many buildings condemned.

Shockoe also included some of the earliest rehabilitated downtown apartments; at the time of the restoration asphalt paving was removed to expose historic Belgian block streets.

A major boom in residential growth was created in the mid-1990s when old warehouses in Tobacco Row were converted into warehouses. Since then, more vacant buildings have been replaced with residential dwellings and new ones have been built. Furthermore, more quality restaurants have moved into the area. Unfortunately, the area lacks retail and tourism. That is expected to change with the Revitalize RVA plan which could attract new development of apartments, a grocery store, and a hotel, all surrounding a stadium. Other projects include the revamping of the 17th Street Farmer's Market into an Open-air pedestrian mall with al fresco dining for the restaurants, the Main Street Station's Train Shed into an urban market with a bike storage facility and bus Rapid Transit station, and Lumpkin's Jail into the Slavery and Freedom Heritage Center. The future of Shockoe is said to be Richmond's center for entertainment and tourism.
