= Brookfield (plantation) =

Coordinates: 37°36′9.52″N 77°30′42.95″W

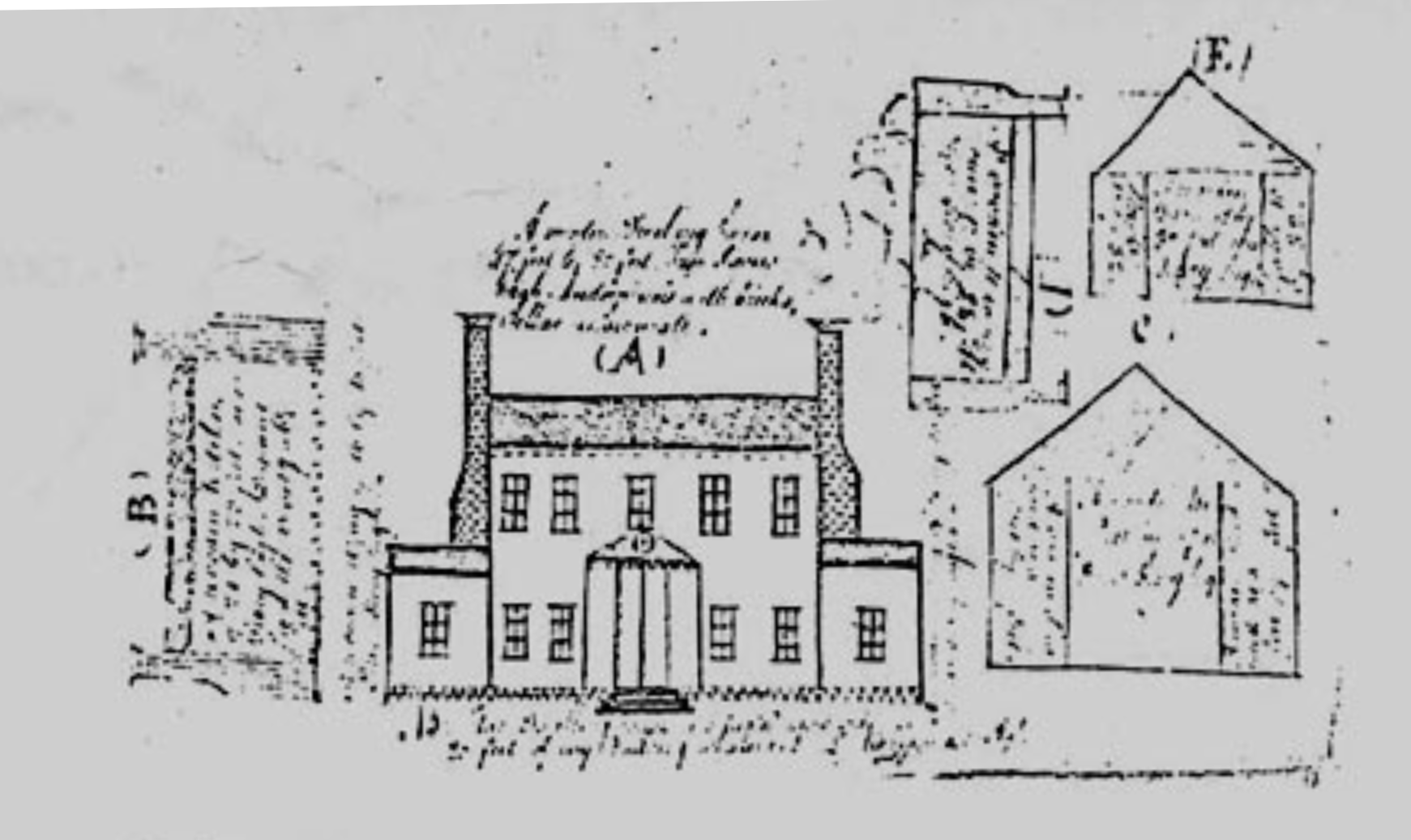
Brookfield plantation, drawing for an 1806 Mutual Assurance Policy

Brookfield was a plantation of about 2,000 acres in Henrico County, Virginia, in the late 18th and 19th centuries. It was first owned by the Prosser family and it is where Gabriel Prosser planned Gabriel's Rebellion of 1800. It is one of several lost historical buildings of the county, and it is near Bon Air, Virginia and Bryan Park in Richmond, Virginia.

== Gabriel's Rebellion ==
Gabriel Prosser, a black preacher, planned a slave rebellion for 1800 that was named after him Gabriel's Rebellion. The plan was thwarted due to a "torrential thunderstorm" and when two enslaved men from the Sheppard family of nearby Meadow Farm sounded the alarm of the upcoming plot. Gabriel and other key individuals who planned the rebellion were tried and hanged.

== The plantation ==
Brookfield was located near Brook Creek and about six miles north of Richmond. The main house was initially a large two-story frame building with a 5-bay structure and one-story wings. There were large porches on the front and back of the house. Behind the main house were a kitchen, a weaving house, two barns, sheds, stables, and a blacksmith shop.

It was replaced in the mid-19th century with a "grander" residence that burned down in 1910. The replacement was a two-story frame building. It had Corinthian columns and a hexastyle pedimented portico. Two bronze lions that had been on either side of the front steps are now in the yard of a house on Chamberlayne Avenue.

== Ownership ==
=== Thomas Prosser ===
Brookfield was first owned by Thomas Prosser, who was a tobacco planter with 53 enslaved people, member of the House of Burgesses, and a partner of Alexander Front and Company, a trading firm in Richmond. He was also a vestryman at the St. John's Episcopal Church. He had a quick temper and in the 1760s he was ejected from the House of Burgesses. Patrick Henry represented him and was able to have his seat reinstated. He and his wife Ann had two children, Elizabeth and a much younger Thomas Henry who was born in 1776. Elizabeth married Thomas Goode in 1777. Prosser died in 1798 and Thomas Henry Prosser took over managing the Brookfield plantation.

=== Other owners ===
Between 1806 and 1815, it was sold to Benjamin Sheppard. The house was then owned by the Dicken family.
