= Richmond Baptist Church and Burying Ground =

Church in Richmond, Virginia, US

The Richmond Baptist Church was the first church to be organized in the city of Richmond, Virginia. The Old Baptist Church Burying Ground (circa 1780–1802) is an American cemetery, an early burial site for enslaved and free Black people, connected to the church. It was later developed over.

== History ==
=== Church foundation and early years ===
Established in 1780 as the Richmond Baptist Church, the church was the first church of any denomination organized in the city of Richmond, Virginia. This meeting house was later referred to as the 'old Baptist Church'. It was also the first Baptist church founded in a Virginia city. Initially, the congregation gathered in private homes before constructing its first meeting house, near the north east corner of Cary at Second Streets. The church building no longer exists, but was located in what is the 200 block of E Cary St. The meeting house later became known as the 'old Baptist Church'. It was described as "One small wooden house, with a shed at either end, stood not far off, in which service was performed by Baptist preachers, for want of a better place of worship. Its locality possessed the advantage of being near the Penitentiary pond -- convenient for immersion--for it was then pure water." The church later became officially known as the First Baptist Church after the formation of the Second Baptist Church in 1820. The congregation moved to a new location at what is now E Broad St. and College St. in 1802. About half of its early members were enslaved and free people of color. By 1840, the church had a significant Black membership, with 1,700 Black members and 373 White members. In 1841, the congregation split along racial lines, leading to the formation of the First African Baptist Church.

=== The Burying Ground ===
The Old Baptist Church Burying Ground is the burial ground associated with the "old Baptist Church" on Cary Street. Established circa 1780 and active until approximately 1802, it served as an early burial site for both enslaved and free Black people connected to the church.

According to a newspaper article in the Daily Dispatch, the burying ground was described as "Extending back from the place of execution towards Main street was a piece of wooded land, attached to the old Baptist Church in which the senior Father Courtney preached. This land was a kind of potters' field, used principally for the burial of negroes, but unenclosed. Here were interred the bodies of Gabriel, Solomon, and Peter, and others who suffered death for participation in the insurrection of 1800, and it was probably their remain that were disturbed by Capt. Coke's workmen." (Note: While the 1871 Daily Dispatch account is a primary source for the physical discovery of remains at this location, modern scholars and preservationists note that Reconstruction-era press accounts often utilized speculative narratives and racial stereotypes when reporting on Black historical figures.) The article states that Gabriel and some of his followers, including his brother Solomon and Peter, were interred there after their 1800 execution for involvement in a planned slave insurrection aimed at gaining control of Richmond and negotiating an end to slavery in Virginia. Whalthall's 'Hidden Things Brought to Light', written in 1861, notes that tombstones were protruding from the ground at 2nd and Cary Streets. Walthall states that the First Baptist people had selected it for a site.

In 1871, human remains were discovered during excavations for a new residence, belonging to Capt. John A. Coke, at the corner of Cary and 3rd streets. This plot (#659) was previously part of the old Baptist Church property. Newspaper speculation suggested the remains might belong to Gabriel, Solomon, Peter, and others executed on Gallows Hill based on accounts of their burials at that location.

The primary site for public executions in Richmond in 1800 was Gallows Hill, near Canal and 1st Streets, located within a few blocks of the old Baptist Church. The Shockoe Bottom African Burial Ground became the main execution site after 1806, and the Shockoe Hill African Burying Ground after 1816.

For several years following its rediscovery in the 1990s, the Shockoe Bottom African Burial Ground was believed by some to be the execution and burial site of Gabriel and his followers, after their failed rebellion. However, research of municipal records by scholars like Michael L. Nicholls and others indicates that the 'usual place' of execution in Richmond at the time of their 1800 condemnation was Gallows Hill, located near Canal Street and 1st Street, a few blocks from the old Baptist Church. The Burial Ground for Negroes in Shockoe Bottom, as it was known historically, became the 'usual place' of execution after 1806.
