= Joca Claudino =

Coordinates: 6°29′24″S 38°28′33″W

Joca Claudino Santarém
- Municipality
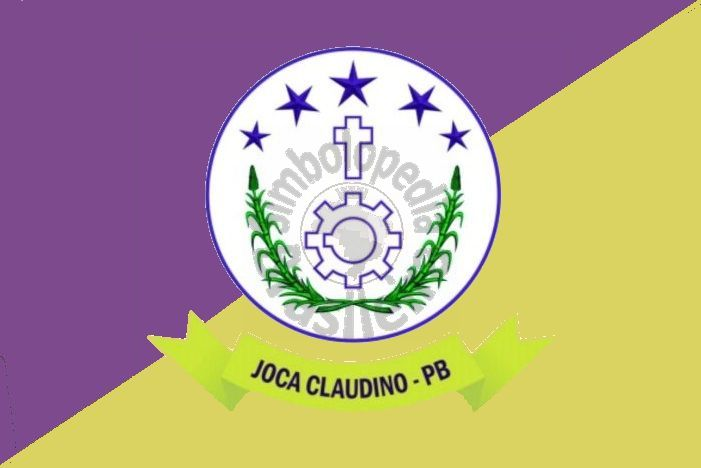
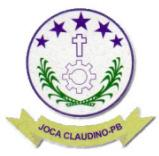
- Flag Coat of arms
- Interactive map of Joca Claudino
- Country: Brazil
- Region: Northeast
- State: Paraíba
- Mesoregion: Sertão Paraibana

Population (2020)
  - Total: 2,639
- Time zone: UTC−3 (BRT)

Joca Claudino (formerly Santarém) is a municipality in the state of Paraíba in the Northeast Region of Brazil.

== History ==
On 9 November 2010 the municipality passed a law which changed its name from Santarém to Joca Claudino in honor of a local businessman.

== See also ==
- List of municipalities in Paraíba
