= Joca Marques =

Coordinates: 3.47778°S 42.4278°W

- Municipality
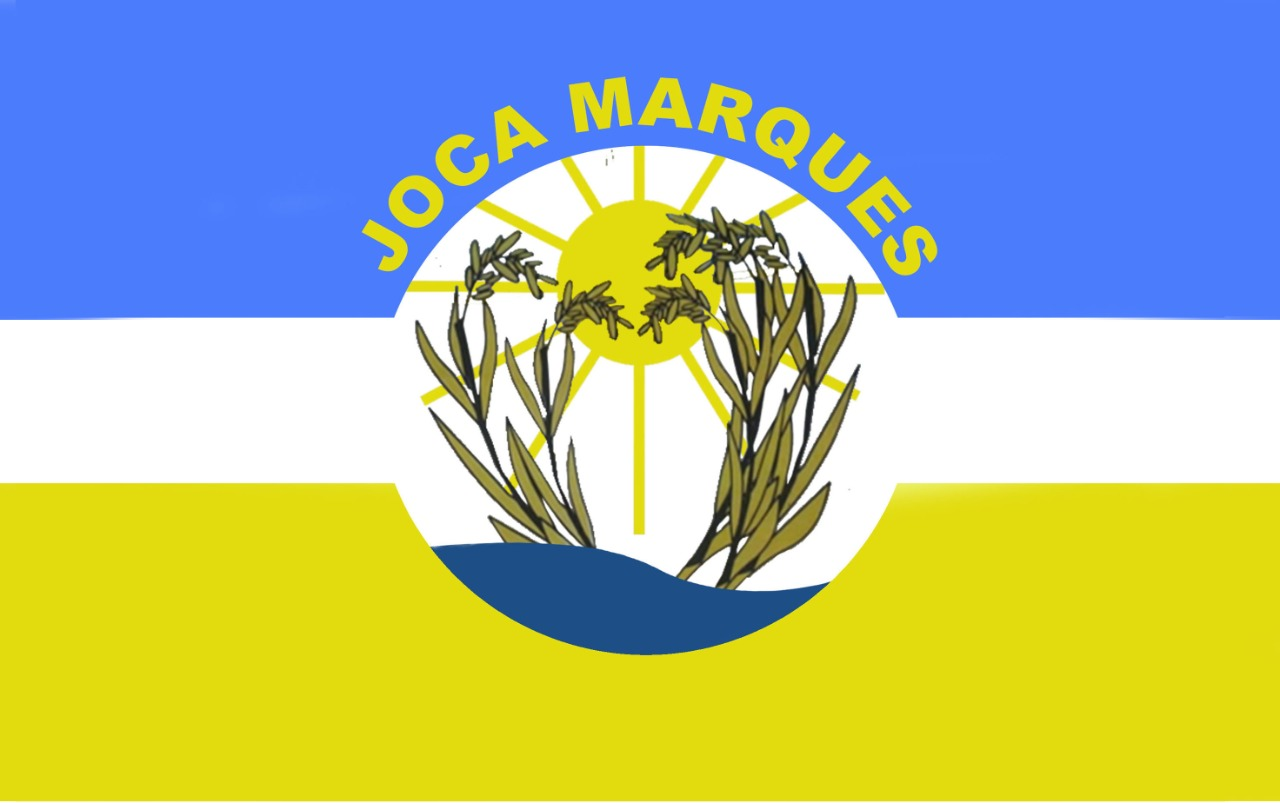
- Flag

- Country: Brazil
- Region: Nordeste
- State: Piauí
- Mesoregion: Norte Piauiense

Population (2020)
  - Total: 5,466
- Time zone: UTC−3 (BRT)

Joca Marques is a municipality in the state of Piauí in the Northeast region of Brazil.

== See also ==
- List of municipalities in Piauí
