= Shockoe Bottom African Burial Ground =

Cemetery in Richmond, Virginia, US

Coordinates: 37°32′14.6″N 77°25′39.0″W

The Shockoe Bottom African Burial Ground, known historically as the "Burial Ground for Negroes" and the "old Powder Magazine ground", is the older of two municipal burial grounds established for the interment of free people of color and the enslaved in the city of Richmond, Virginia. It is located at 1554 E Broad St. (alternate address 1520 E Marshall St.), across from the site of Lumpkin's Jail, in Shockoe Bottom. The area now known as Shockoe Bottom, was historically known as Shockoe Valley. Richmond's second African Burial Ground, called the Shockoe Hill African Burying Ground is the larger of the two burial grounds, and is located a mile and a half away at 1305 N 5th St, on Shockoe Hill.

== History ==
The Shockoe Bottom African Burial Ground was thought to have been established as early as 1750, however a land deed for the property supports a 1799 founding. It was closed to new burials in 1816 upon the opening of the Shockoe Hill African Burying Ground (Richmond's 2nd African Burial Ground) located at 1305 N 5th St.

In 1799, the city of Richmond acquired two parcels of land to establish municipal burial grounds. A 28 1/2-acre plot on the northern end of Shockoe Hill, straddling the boundary between the city and Henrico County, was purchased primarily for the burial of white individuals, among other purposes. A smaller parcel in Shockoe Valley (later known as Shockoe Bottom) was designated for the interment of Black individuals. This was referred to as the "Burial Ground for Negroes" on the 1809 Plan of the City of Richmond by Richard Young, and is now recognized as the Shockoe Bottom African Burying Ground. This site later served as the location for the city gallows after 1804 and, according to the 1809 plan, housed a powder magazine. In the same year, 1799, the city added two lots for public burials of white individuals to St. John’s Church.

Following the rediscovery of the Shockoe Bottom African Burial Ground by Elizabeth Kambourian in the 1990s, it was initially believed to be the site where Gabriel, the leader of a planned 1800 slave rebellion (known as Gabriel's Rebellion or Gabriel's Conspiracy), and some of his followers were executed and buried. However, subsequent research indicated that these executions occurred at different location(s). Gabriel and those of his followers who were executed within the city were reportedly hanged on Gallows Hill, at the “usual place” near the intersection of 1st Street and Canal Street, which was the customary place of execution at that time. An 1871 newspaper article, featured on the front page of the Daily Dispatch, stated that Gabriel and others involved in the insurrection were buried in a burying ground primarily for Black individuals attached to the "old Baptist Church". This church, originally established as the Richmond Baptist Church (now First Baptist Church) in 1780, had its original meeting house on the north side of Cary Street, near the northeast corner of Cary and Second Streets. A section of property associated with the church, specifically Lot #659 at the corner of Cary and 3rd Streets, was later owned by Col. John Coke. Human remains discovered during the construction of Col. Coke's house on this portion of Lot #659 in 1871 led to speculation in the newspaper article that these could be the bones of Gabriel, Solomon, and Peter, given that they were stated to be buried in the “old Baptist Church” burying ground located a couple of blocks away from the site of execution.

The Burial Ground for Negroes (now Shockoe Bottom African Burial Ground) was established along Shockoe Creek, but its location was unsuitable for burials. Each hard rain caused disruption, washing bodies into the creek. Christopher McPherson, a formerly enslaved free person of color, described the challenging conditions in his book, A Short History of the Life of Christopher McPherson, Alias Pherson, Son of Christ, King of Kings and Lord of Lords. Containing a Collection of Certificates, Letters, &c. Written by Himself, which was published in 1811 and republished in 1855. McPherson wrote and circulated a petition to the Richmond City Council requesting a new burial ground for free people of color in Richmond. This led to the establishment of two new burying grounds on Shockoe Hill in 1816: the Burying Ground for Free People of Colour and the Burying Ground for Negroes (enslaved). These are now part of the Shockoe Hill African Burying Ground. Upon the opening of the Shockoe Hill burying grounds, the Shockoe Bottom African Burial Ground closed to new burials and was repurposed, resulting in the destruction of graves. A Lancastrian School was constructed on the site in 1816, and the city jail was also built there later. The burial ground disappeared from the visible landscape and from memory. Local historian Elizabeth Kambourian rediscovered it on a map in the 1990s. Approximately in 2004, Virginia Commonwealth University (VCU) acquired the Shockoe Bottom site, then a parking lot. This acquisition prompted activism and the formation of groups such as the Sacred Ground Historical Reclamation Project. The Sacred Ground Historical Reclamation Project advocates for the reclamation and proper stewardship of the Shockoe Bottom African Burial Ground.

== Commemoration ==
Public acknowledgment of the Shockoe Bottom African Burial Ground, which was then covered with asphalt, began during the Elegba Folklore Society's Juneteenth, A Freedom Celebration in 2002 or potentially earlier. This commemoration annually recognizes the history and significance of the Trail of Enslaved Africans and the Shockoe Bottom African Burial Ground. Additionally, the Elegba Folklore Society guides cultural history tours that include a "tribute" to this burial ground.

The Sacred Ground Historical Reclamation Project, a project of the Defenders for Freedom, Justice & Equality, hosts an annual community gathering, known as the Gabriel Gathering, each October at the Shockoe Bottom African Burial Ground. The event recognizes Gabriel, a key figure in the 1800 slave rebellion, and commemorates those involved. Participants also focus on interpreting the history of the site and advocating for the reclamation and commemoration of Shockoe Bottom, highlighting its historical significance as a center of the U.S. domestic slave trade.

The ongoing effort to memorialize and interpret the history of the Shockoe Bottom African Burial Ground is now part of the broader Shockoe Project, an initiative aimed at creating a comprehensive historical destination in Shockoe Valley to recognize the history of enslaved and free Africans and people of African descent. The burial ground, once forgotten, is now the focus of ongoing preservation efforts.

On October 10, 2024 at the 22nd Annual Gabriel Gathering, an Historic Highway Marker was unveiled for the Shockoe Bottom African Burial Ground, Richmond's First Municipal African Cemetery. The marker was sponsored by the Virginia Department of Historic Resources (DHR).

On August 30, 2026, a Historic Highway Marker titled "Gabriel's Uprising" was installed as a replacement to the 2004 "Gabriel's Execution" marker on E. Broad Street between 15th and 16th streets just outside of the Shockoe Bottom African Burial Ground. The updated marker corrects historical inaccuracies regarding the location of Gabriel's execution and burial, noting that he was executed at Gallows' Hill and buried at the Old Baptist Church Burying Ground on Cary Street as opposed to the Shockoe Bottom African Burial Ground as previously thought.

== Distinction of burial grounds ==
There are several burial grounds in Richmond, Virginia, related to the city's African American history. These sites are distinct in their location, history, and current status:

- Old Baptist Church Burying Ground (active circa 1780–1802) associated with the early Richmond Baptist Church on Cary Street, this site predates the municipal burial grounds and was used for both enslaved and free Black members. (Note: While the 1871 Daily Dispatch account is a primary source for the physical discovery of remains at this location, modern scholars and preservationists note that Reconstruction-era press accounts often utilized speculative narratives and racial stereotypes when reporting on Black historical figures.) It was later developed over and is now an invisible site on private property.
- Shockoe Bottom African Burial Ground (active 1799–1816) located in Shockoe Bottom (historically Shockoe Valley), across from the site of Lumpkin's Jail, this is the older of the two municipal burial grounds, active from 1799 to 1816.
- Shockoe Hill African Burying Ground (active 1816–1879) situated on Shockoe Hill, it was established in 1816 as a replacement for the Shockoe Bottom burial ground. It is estimated to contain over 22,000 individuals, making it the largest known burial ground for free people of color and the enslaved in the United States. The ongoing preservation challenges facing the Shockoe Hill African Burying Ground are highlighted by the Federal Railroad Administration's (FRA) determination that the proposed DC2RVA high-speed rail project would have an "adverse effect" on the site, demonstrating the complexities involved in protecting these historically significant spaces.[
