= Friends' Asylum for Colored Orphans =

Friends' Asylum for Colored Orphans (later the Friends Association for Colored Children and currently Friends' Association for Children) was an African American orphanage at 112 West Charity Street in Richmond, Virginia. It began as a program to provide care and education to African American children and later evolved into a foster care center, an unwed mothers and pre-adoption boarding home and a community day care facility. It is currently operating as a family services organization.

== History ==
The building's location was authorized by the city council in 1867, and the orphanage opened two years later. Lucy Goode Brooks was instrumental in its establishment. It was incorporated in 1872 by the Society of Friends who had raised US$6,250 to erect a building on the corner of St. Paul and Charity streets. Its purpose was to provide care and education to orphaned African American children. The initial trustees were John B. Crenshaw, Jeremiah Willets, William H. Pleasants, Richard A. Ricks and Walter A. Ricks, members of the society of Friends; Rev. James H. Holmes, Nelson Vandervall, members of the First African Baptist Church; Joseph E. Farrar, John Adams, members of Ebenezer Baptist Church; William Boyd, member of the Fifth Baptist Church; Frederick Smith, -— Cooper, members of Mount Zion Baptist Church; P. H. Woolfork, member of Third-street Methodist Church; and Thomas M. Hewlett, member of Manchester Baptist Church.

By virtue of the bylaws, parents were required to yield all rights to their children and the board had discretion to bond children into indenture until their age of majority–21 years for boys and 18 years for girls. Until 1889 only white trustees served on the board; thereafter, only members of black Baptist churches from Richmond could serve as trustees. The number varied according to the financial contribution of the involved churches. In 1902, there were 22 children in attendance, seven of whom were newly admitted; one had run away, and three had died. Seventeen children were in attendance in 1914, and the officers were Rev. W. T. Johnson (president), W. P. Epps (secretary), and Alice Hughes (matron). A study conducted in 1924 in conjunction with the Child Welfare League of America determined that the orphanage was "vital to the city", yet five years later, a second study found that foster care was a more pressing need. In light of this, in 1931, the orphanage was closed and the facility was transformed into foster care agency overseen by Richmond's branch of the Children's Aid Society.

In 1932 the name was changed to the Friends' Association for Colored Children and in 1938, the organization expanded to include adoption services. By 1940, in-home counseling services for children were included and in 1947 day nursery services were offered to the community. Other changes in the mid-1950s included suspension of foster care services, addition of assistance to unwed mothers, and the evolution of the center to a pre-adoption boarding home. Still later, the name was changed again to the Friends' Association for Children. It currently operates as a service organization for low to moderate-income families providing childcare and family support.

== Bibliography ==
- General Assembly of the State of Virginia (1872). Acts and Joint Resolutions, Amending the Constitution, of the General Assembly of the State of Virginia (Public domain ed.). D. Bottom.
- Kimball, Gregg D. (1 November 2003). American City, Southern Place: A Cultural History of Antebellum Richmond. University of Georgia Press. ISBN 978-0-8203-2546-0.
- Mayor Richmond, VA (1902). Annual Message (Public domain ed.).
- Rabinowitz, Howard N. (1994). Race, Ethnicity, and Urbanization: Selected Essays. University of Missouri Press. p. 80. ISBN 978-0-8262-0930-6.
- Virginia Department of Public Welfare (1915). Report (Public domain ed.).
