= Barton Heights Cemeteries =

Historic African American cemeteries in Virginia, United States

- U.S. National Register of Historic Places
- Virginia Landmarks Register
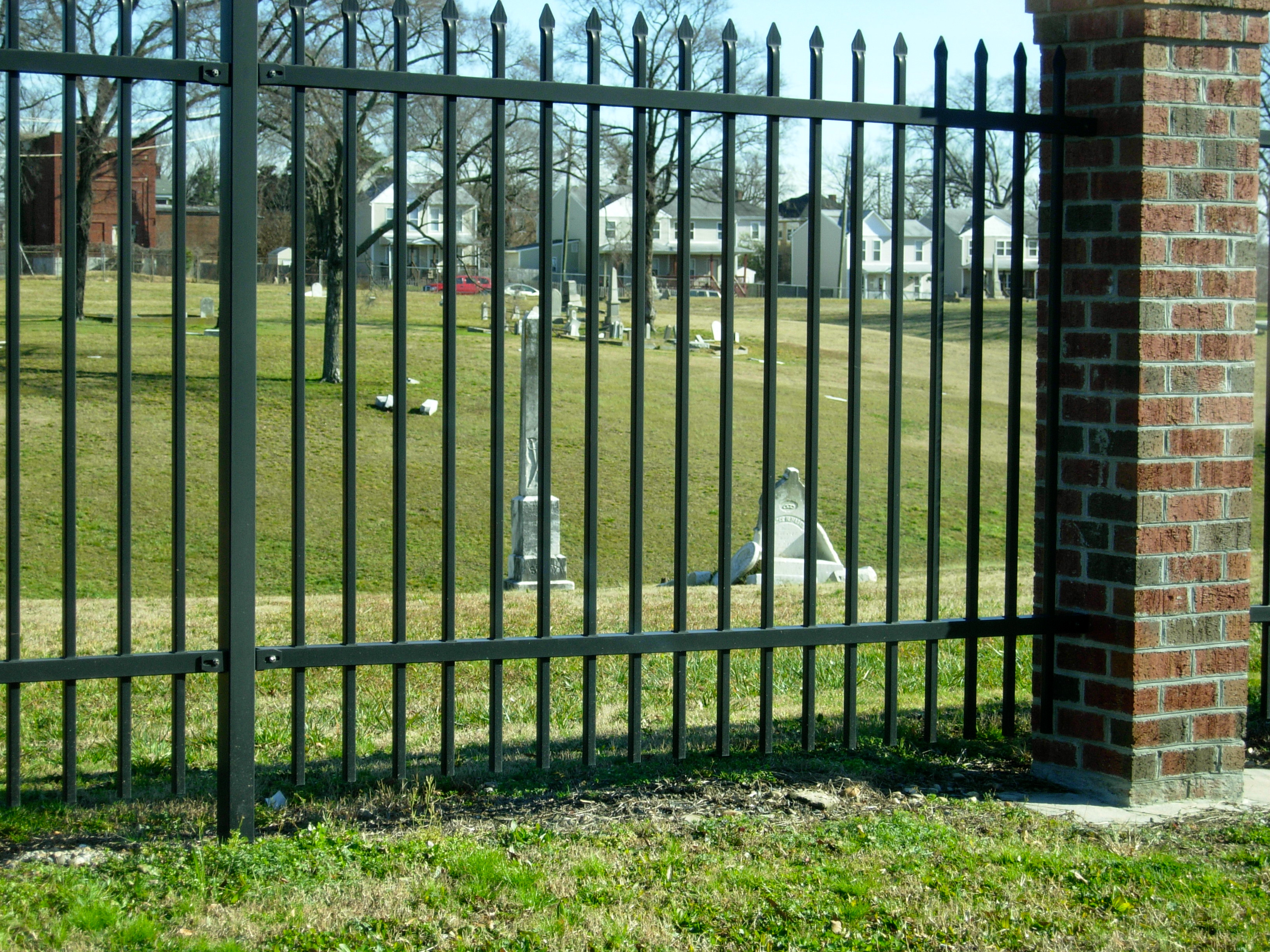
- Barton Heights Cemeteries, July 2011

- Location within Virginia Location within the United States
- Location: 1600 Lamb Ave., Richmond, Virginia
- Coordinates: 37°33′29″N 77°25′58″W
- Area: 12.6 acres (5.1 ha)
- Built: 1815
- NRHP reference No.: 02000364
- VLR No.: 127-5679

Significant dates
- Added to NRHP: April 10, 2002
- Designated VLR: June 13, 2001

Barton Heights Cemeteries is a set of six contiguous historic African-American cemeteries located in Richmond, Virginia, though were originally part of Henrico County. The cemeteries are the Cedarwood, originally called Phoenix and established in 1815, Union Mechanics, Methodist, Sycamore, Ebenezer, and Sons and Daughters of Ham cemeteries. The cemeteries were established between 1815 and circa 1877, and include hundreds of burials.

The cemeteries were listed on the National Register of Historic Places in 2002.
