= Joca (footballer, born 1995) =

Portuguese footballer

Personal information
- Full name: João Carlos Almeida Leandro
- Date of birth: 13 September 1995 (age 31)
- Place of birth: Lourosa, Portugal
- Height: 1.85 m (6 ft 1 in)
- Position: Centre-back

Youth career
- 2005–2014: Feirense

Senior career*
Years	Team	Apps	(Gls)
2014–2016	Feirense	0	(0)
2015	→ Espinho (loan)	0	(0)
2015–2016	→ Cesarense (loan)	4	(0)
2016–2017	Esmoriz	18	(0)
2017–2019	Lusitânia	2	(0)
2019–2022	Florgrade	41	(3)
- * Club domestic league appearances and goals as of 18:33, 20 May 2023 (UTC)

João Carlos Almeida Leandro (born 13 September 1995), known as Joca, is a Portuguese footballer who plays as a central defender.

== Club career ==
Born in Lourosa (Santa Maria da Feira), Joca spent his formative years with local club C.D. Feirense. His only competitive game with the first team occurred on 13 August 2014, when he played 90 minutes against C.D. Aves for that season's Taça da Liga (1–1 home draw).
