= Shockoe Bottom =

- Shockoe Valley and Tobacco Row Historic District
- U.S. National Register of Historic Places
- U.S. Historic district
- Virginia Landmarks Register
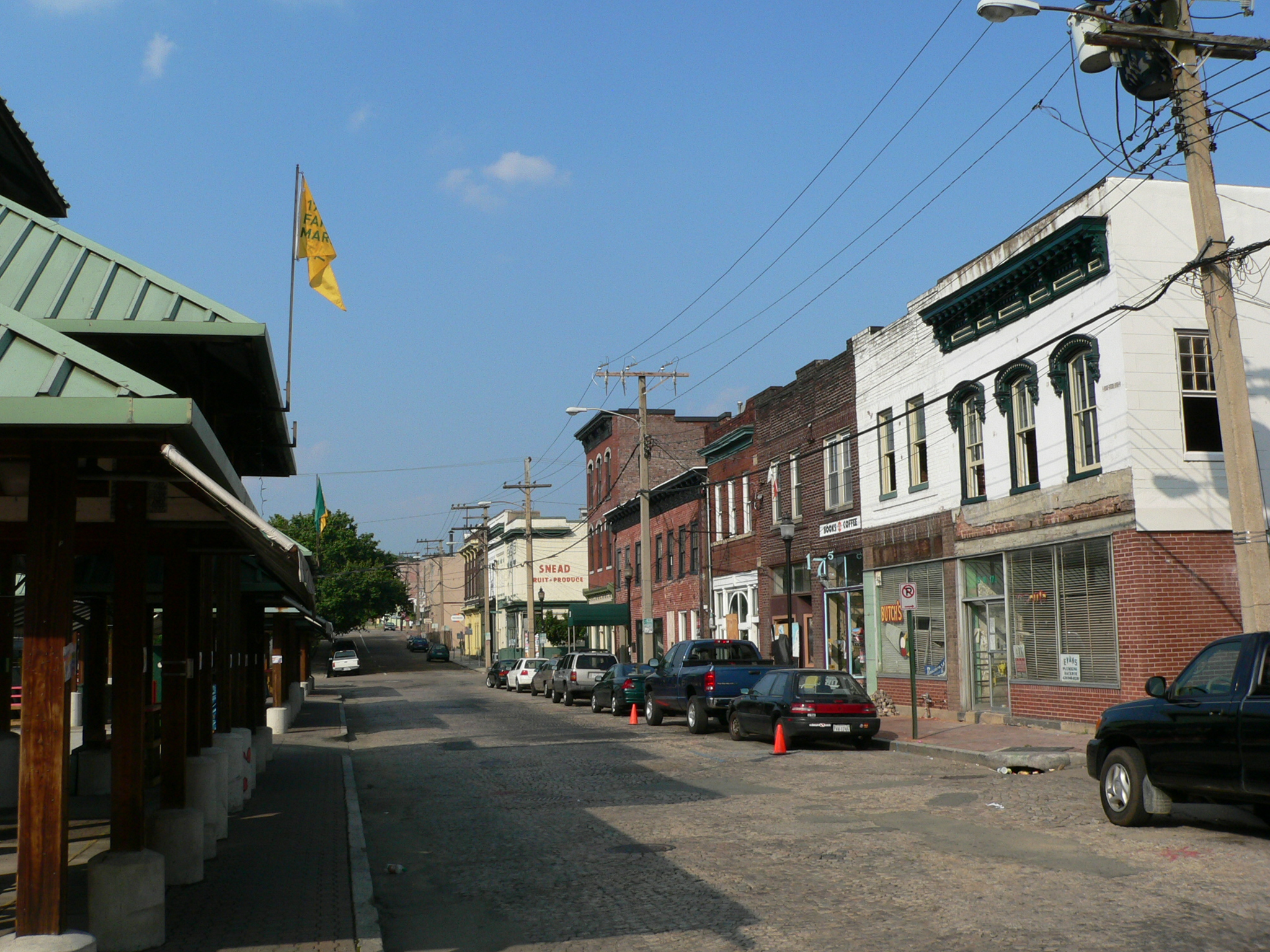
- View north on 17th Street

- Location within Virginia Location within the United States
- Location: Roughly bounded by Dock, 15th, Clay, Franklin, and Pear Streets, Richmond, Virginia
- Coordinates: 37°31′56″N 77°25′29″W
- Area: 129 acres (52 ha)
- Architectural style: Mid 19th Century Revival, Late 19th and 20th Century Revivals, Late Victorian
- NRHP reference No.: 83003308 (original); 100012323 (increase)
- VLR No.: 127-0344

Significant dates
- Added to NRHP: February 24, 1983
- Boundary increase: September 22, 2025
- Designated VLR: July 21, 1981; August 23, 2007

Shockoe Bottom, historically known as Shockoe Valley, is an area in Richmond, Virginia, just east of downtown, along the James River. Located between Shockoe Hill and Church Hill, Shockoe Bottom contains much of the land included in Colonel William Mayo's 1737 plan of Richmond, making it one of the city's oldest neighborhoods.

== History ==
Shockoe was named in the 1730 Tobacco Inspection Act as the site of a tobacco inspection warehouse on land owned by William Byrd II. The area's development in the late 18th century was aided by move of the state capital to Richmond and the construction of Mayo's bridge in 1788 across the James River (ultimately succeeded by the mode on 14th Street Bridge]]), as well as the siting of key tobacco industry structures, such as the public warehouse, tobacco scales, and the Federal Customs House in or near the district. Throughout the 19th Century, Shockoe Bottom was the center of Richmond's commerce with ships pulling into port from the James River. Goods coming off these ships were warehoused and traded in Shockoe Valley.

Between the late 17th century and the end of the American Civil War in 1865, the area played a major role in the history of slavery in the United States, serving as the second-largest domestic slave trade site in the country, second to New Orleans. Profits from the trade in human beings fueled the creation of wealth for Southern whites and drove the economy in Richmond, leading 15th Street to be known as Wall Street in the antebellum period, with the surrounding blocks home to more than 69 slave dealers and auction houses. In 2006, archaeological excavations were begun on the former site of Lumpkin's Jail. Nearby, located at 15th and E Broad St., is the Shockoe Bottom African Burial Ground, long used as a commercial parking lot, most recently by Virginia Commonwealth University, a state institution. It was reclaimed in 2011 after a decade-long community organizing campaign, and today it is a memorial park, though part of the burial ground lies beneath Interstate Highway 95.

On the eve of the fall of Richmond to the Union Army in April 1865, evacuating Confederate forces were ordered to set fire to the city's tobacco warehouses. The fires spread, and completely destroyed Shockoe Slip and several other districts. The district was quickly rebuilt in the late 1860s, flourishing further in the 1870s, and forming much of its present historic building stock. Architecturally, many of the buildings were constructed during the rebuilding following the Evacuation Fire of 1865, especially in a commercial variant of the Italianate style, including a 1909 fountain, dedicated to "one who loved animals." The buildings in the district, which historically housed a variety of offices, wholesale and retail establishments, are now primarily restaurants, shops, offices, and apartments. It warehoused many of the city's goods, mostly tobacco. The district began declining in the 1920s, as other areas of the city rose in prominence with the advent of the automobile. Numerous structures would be demolished and cleared, including (in the 1950s), the Tobacco Exchange, which had been at the heart of the district. Up until they moved from Tobacco Row in the 1980s, the area was home to many of the country's largest tobacco companies.

== Historic landmarks ==
Shockoe Bottom is home to several historic sites and buildings:

- Shockoe Bottom African Burial Ground
- Edgar Allan Poe Museum
- Lumpkin's Jail, Devil's Half Acre
- Mason's Hall (built 1785–1787)
- Richmond Slave Trail
- Richmond Main Street Station (built 1901)
- Old Henrico County Courthouse (built 1898)
- 17th Street Market

== Redevelopment ==
After centuries of periodic flooding by the James River, development was greatly stimulated by the completion of Richmond's James River Flood Wall and the Canal Walk in 1995. The next flooding disaster came not from the river, but from Hurricane Gaston, which brought extensive local tributary flooding along the basin of Shockoe Creek and did extensive damage to the area in 2004, with businesses being shut down and many buildings condemned.

A major boom in residential growth was created in the mid-1990s when old warehouses in Tobacco Row were converted into apartments. Since then, more vacant buildings have been replaced with residential dwellings and new ones have been built.

The National Trust for Historic Preservation named Shockoe Bottom one of America's 11 Most Endangered Historic Places in 2014 and a National Treasure shortly thereafter because of "Revitalize RVA", the controversial plan to construct a minor league baseball stadium, a national museum of slavery, a Hyatt hotel, a Kroger grocery store, and residential and commercial office space at the site.

In 2016 The National Trust for Historic Preservation, Dr. Max Page of the University of Massachusetts Center for Design Engagement, the Sacred Ground Historical Reclamation Project, and the now defunct Richmond Slave Trail Commission began collaboration on an updated concept for the slave memorial.

In 2018, Shockoe Bottom was one of 16 projects awarded mines from the African American Cultural Heritage Action Fund.

As of 2020, there are ongoing efforts to construct a museum of slavery in the Shockoe Bottom that commemorates the Lumpkin's Slave Jail / Devil's Half-Acre site.

== See also ==
- Slave markets and slave jails in the United States
