= First Baptist Church (Richmond, Virginia) =

Historic church in Virginia, United States

- U.S. National Register of Historic Places
- Virginia Landmarks Register
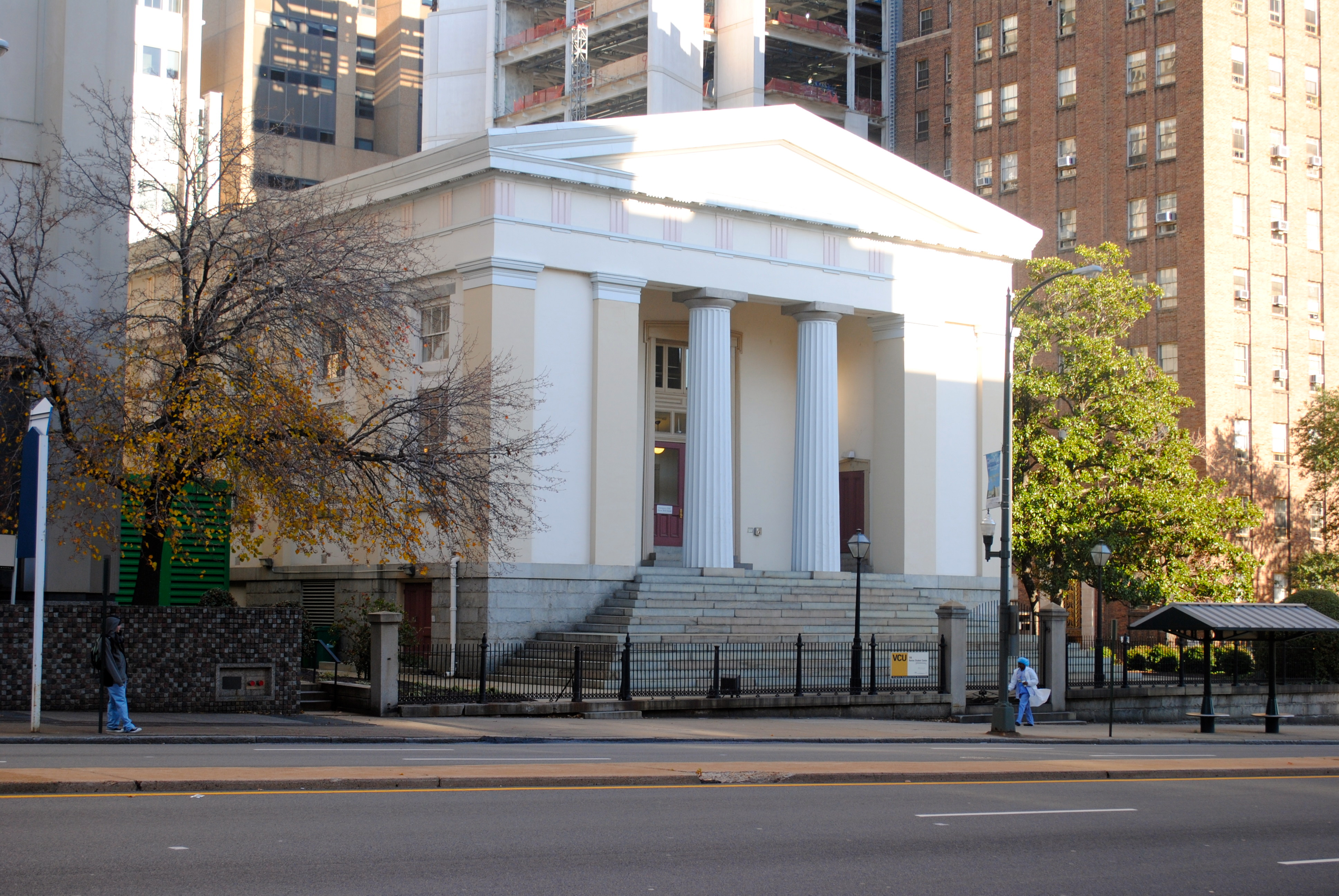
- Old First Baptist Church, December 2011

- Location within Virginia Location within the United States
- Location: NW corner of 12th and E. Broad Sts., Richmond, Virginia
- Coordinates: 37°32′22″N 77°25′53″W
- Area: 0.3 acres (0.12 ha)
- Built: 1839-1841
- Architect: Walter, Thomas U.
- Architectural style: Greek Revival
- NRHP reference No.: 69000349
- VLR No.: 127-0168

Significant dates
- Added to NRHP: April 16, 1969
- Designated VLR: November 5, 1968

First Baptist Church is a historic Baptist church in Richmond, Virginia, United States. Established in 1780, the church is located on the corner of Monument Avenue and Arthur Ashe Boulevard. As of 2024 the senior minister is the Rev. Dr. Jim Somerville, former pastor of the First Baptist Church of Washington, D.C. Its historic building at 12th and East Broad streets is the home of Virginia Commonwealth University's Hunton Student Center.

== History ==
The First Baptist Church was originally organized in June 1780 by 14 members under the leadership of its first pastor Joshua Morris as the Richmond Baptist Church. It was the first church to be organized in Richmond, and in a Virginia city. In the beginning the congregation worshiped and met in the private home of Mr. Franklin located at Carrington St. and Pink St. on Union Hill. They also met in the home of Mrs. Martha Miller near 18th St. and Venable St. Their first church building (meeting house) was a one story frame structure constructed on the north side of Cary St., between 2nd St and 3rd St. It was constructed sometime after 1780 and before 1798. Currently that location contains both buildings without basements and parking lots. Attached to the old Baptist Church on Cary St. was a burying ground (old Baptist Church Burying Ground), primarily for the interment of Negroes. It was also said to have been the burial place of Gabriel and some of his followers who were executed in 1800, just a couple of blocks away on Gallows Hill for a planned slave rebellion.

In 1802 a new church building was constructed at E Broad St. at College St. The church moved from that location in 1841 to E Broad St. at 12th St. Their new building was designed by architect Thomas U. Walter. It is a stuccoed temple-form Greek Revival style building with the two fluted Doric order columns of its portico in antis. During the American Civil War the church building served as an emergency hospital for Confederate Army soldiers. In 1938, the congregation sold the church to the Medical College of Virginia.

The original First Baptist Church had a mixed congregation. In 1840 there were 373 White members and 1,700 Black members. In 1841, the Black and White congregation separated racially. The White members moved into their new church building at E Broad St at 12th St. The Black members remained in the old building, and were allowed to form the First African Baptist Church. The First African Baptist Church purchased the existing church building at E Broad St. at 14th St. (now College St.). This building was torn down in 1876 and replaced with the one that stands in that location today.

== Pastors (1780-2025) ==
- Rev. Joshua Morris was the first pastor (1780-1786).
- Rev. John Courtney was the 2nd pastor (1788-1824).
  - Co-pastors John Bryce (1810-1822), Andrew Broaddus (1822-....) Henry Keeling (1822-1825)
- Rev. John Kerr (1825-1833).
- Rev. Isaac Taylor Hinton (1833-1835).
- Rev. Jeremiah B. Jeter (1836-1849).
- Basil Manly Jr. was the pastor from 1850 to 1854.
- Rev. John Lansing Burrows, D. D. (1854-1874)
- Rev. Ebenezer W Warren (1876-1879)
- Rev. James B. Hawthorne (1879-1884)
- Rev. George Cooper (1885-1903)
- Rev. George W. McDaniel (1905-1927)
- Rev. Charles W. Daniel (1928-1934)
- Rev. Theodore F. Adams (1936-1968)
- Rev. Luther Joe Thompson (1968-1982)
- Rev. Peter James Flamming (1983-2006)
- Rev. James Green Somerville (2008–present)

== Modern use ==
The Medical College of Virginia acquired the building at E Broad St. at 12th St. in 1938, and it became the institution's first student center. In 1989, the building, then part of Virginia Commonwealth University, was named Hunton Hall for Eppa Hunton Jr. and Eppa Hunton IV. It was renovated from 2005 to 2007.
