= Catharine (slave) =

Enslaved mother, b. c. 1835

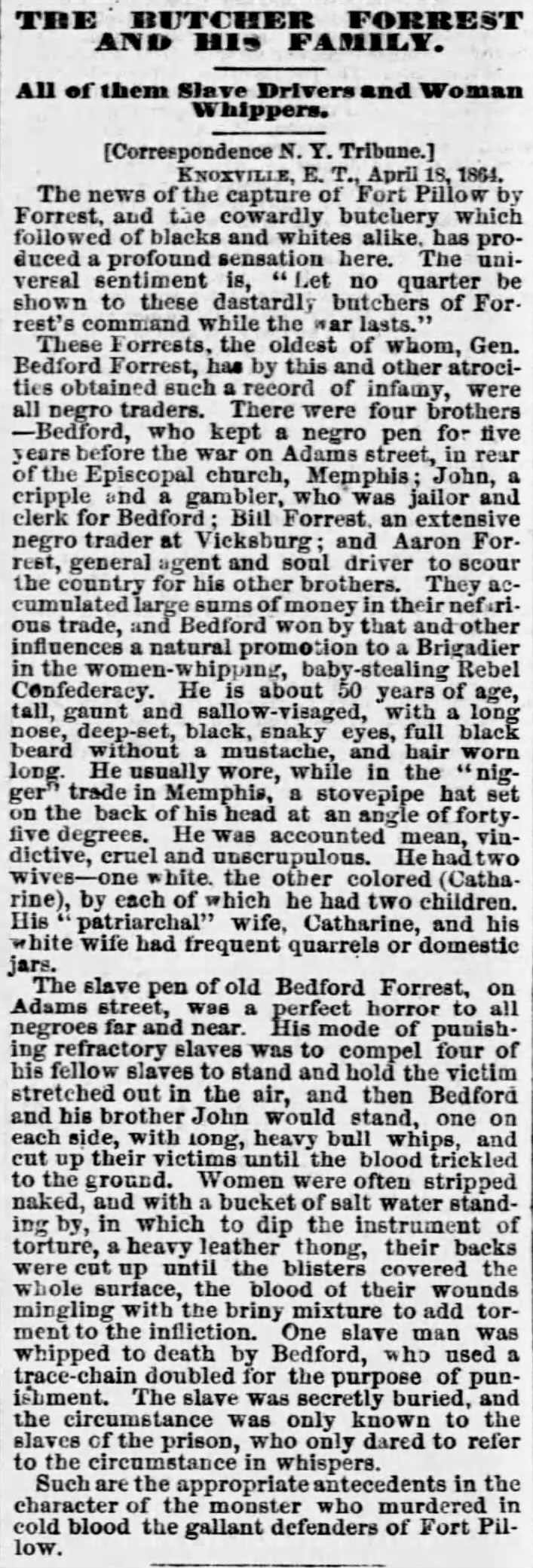
- Born: c. 1835; Likely Tennessee
- Other names: Cath Forrest, Catherine Forrest
- Children: Thomas (b. August 1853), possibly Narcissa Forrest (b. c. 1857)

Catharine (born c. 1835?) was an enslaved woman of Tennessee in the United States who may have been associated with slave trader and Confederate cavalry commander Nathan Bedford Forrest. Her life is poorly documented, and she could be a propagandistic device. She is known primarily from one unsigned anti-Forrest newspaper article that appeared in the wake of the Battle of Fort Pillow, but there are two, possibly three, other sources that may at least confirm her existence.

== Historical records ==
Per an unsigned item about Nathan Bedford Forrest and his brothers that was credited only to a "Knoxville, E.T." correspondent of the New-York Tribune and published in a number of U.S.-aligned newspapers in 1864:"

He usually wore, while in the 'nigger' trade in Memphis, a stovepipe hat set on the back of his bead at an angle of forty-five degrees. He was accounted mean, vindictive, cruel and unscrupulous. He had two wives, one white, the other colored (Catharine), by each of which he had two children. His 'patriarchal' wife, Catharine, and his white wife had frequent quarrels or domestic jars."

During this era of United States history, "political enemies often accused one another of miscegenation." Forrest's most recent major biographer, Jack Hurst, described the Knoxville–Tribune report of 1864 as, overall, "inflammatory but in some ways accurate," and specifically in the case of Catharine: "The partisan invective of the brief article might make it dismissable were it not intriguingly stressful of the name 'Catharine' (while Mary Ann's goes unmentioned) and supported by several other Forrest family names and business activities whose accuracy is verifiable."

Hurst also surfaced a record from the Shelby County register, book 16, page 125:

[It may be] Forrest's initial purchase as an individual slave trader of which there remains a record—and apparently the only such transaction he ever made with a firm in which he was a principal—involved the new Hill & Forrest firm around this time. He bought from it 'a Negrow [sic] woman named Catharine aged seventeen and her Child named Thomas aged four months boath [sic] of which we warrant sound in body + mind and Slaves for Life and the title fully guaranteed.'...The purpose of this seemingly special purchase appears impossible to ascertain now. The woman may have been bought to be a housekeeper or simply as an investment, since the value of slaves—particularly that of young, child-bearing females—was rapidly rising. There is also the possibility that this Catharine was, or became, something more.

The price for mother and son on November 10, 1853, was US$1,250 (equivalent to $48,375 in 2025). (Note: Research by historian Alexandra J. Finley has found that it was not unusual for slave traders (e.g. John Hagan, Jonathan M. Wilson, Theophilus Freeman, Robert Lumpkin, et al.) to have women called "colored concubines" and/or "mulatto housekeepers" (cf Mary Lumpkin) who served as de facto wives and who were often the mothers of one or more children by said slave traders.)

There is also a Cath Forrest (Cath with a C, and Forrest with two Rs), mulatto, age 36, listed in the 1870 U.S. census in Memphis, Tennessee, living and/or working in what is likely a boarding house. Also resident is a 13-year-old mulatto girl (born c. 1857) whose name appears to be Narcissa Forrest.

A Catherine Forrest also appears twice in the Memphis city directory in the 1870s:

- "Forrest, Catherine, col, r 199 Monroe" in the 1874 Boyle-Chapman directory
- "Forrest, Catherine, col'd, domestic, r 239 Madison" in the 1877 Sholes directory

== Gallery ==
Catharine
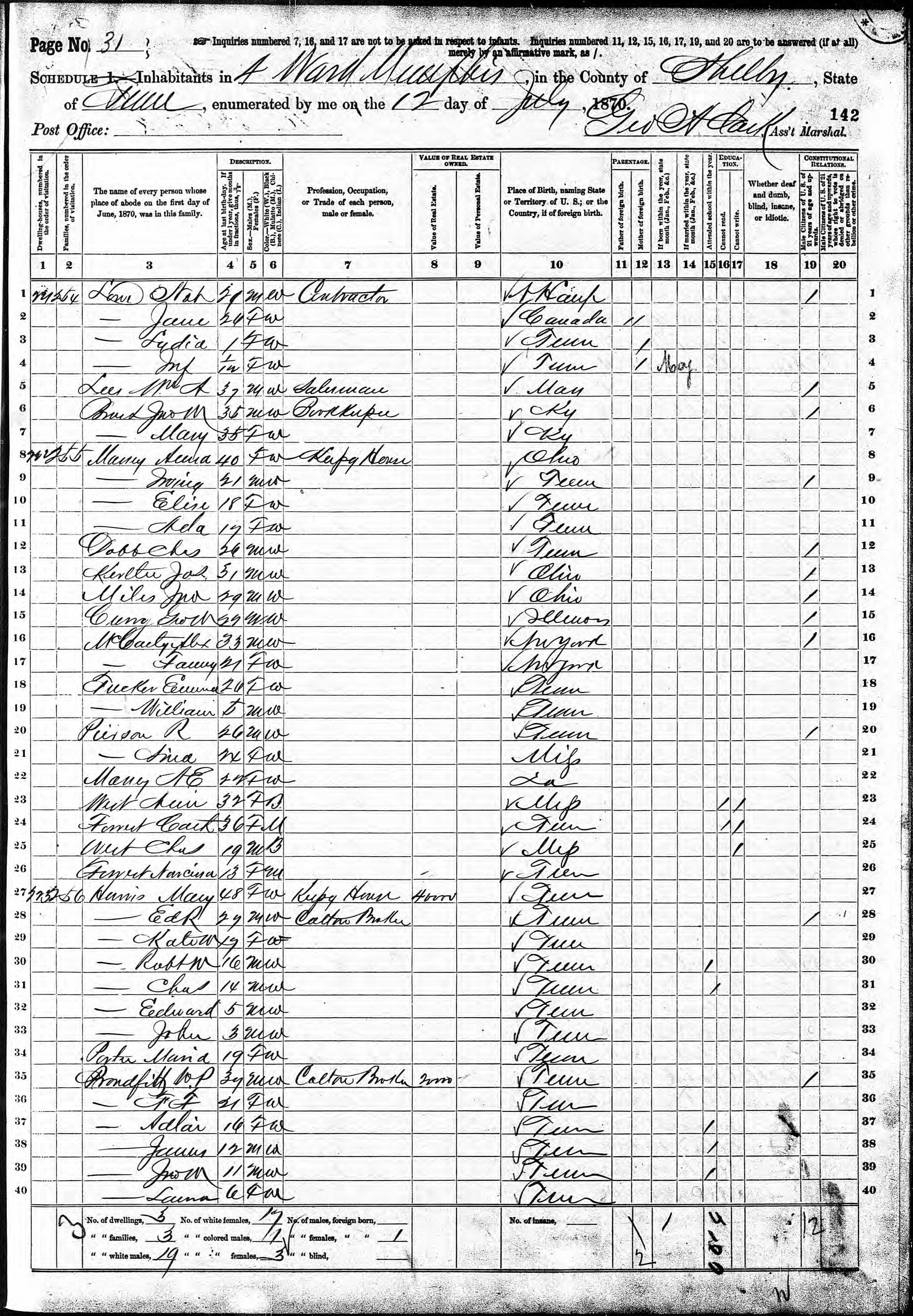
Cath Forrest and Narcissa Forrest in the 1870 U.S. census

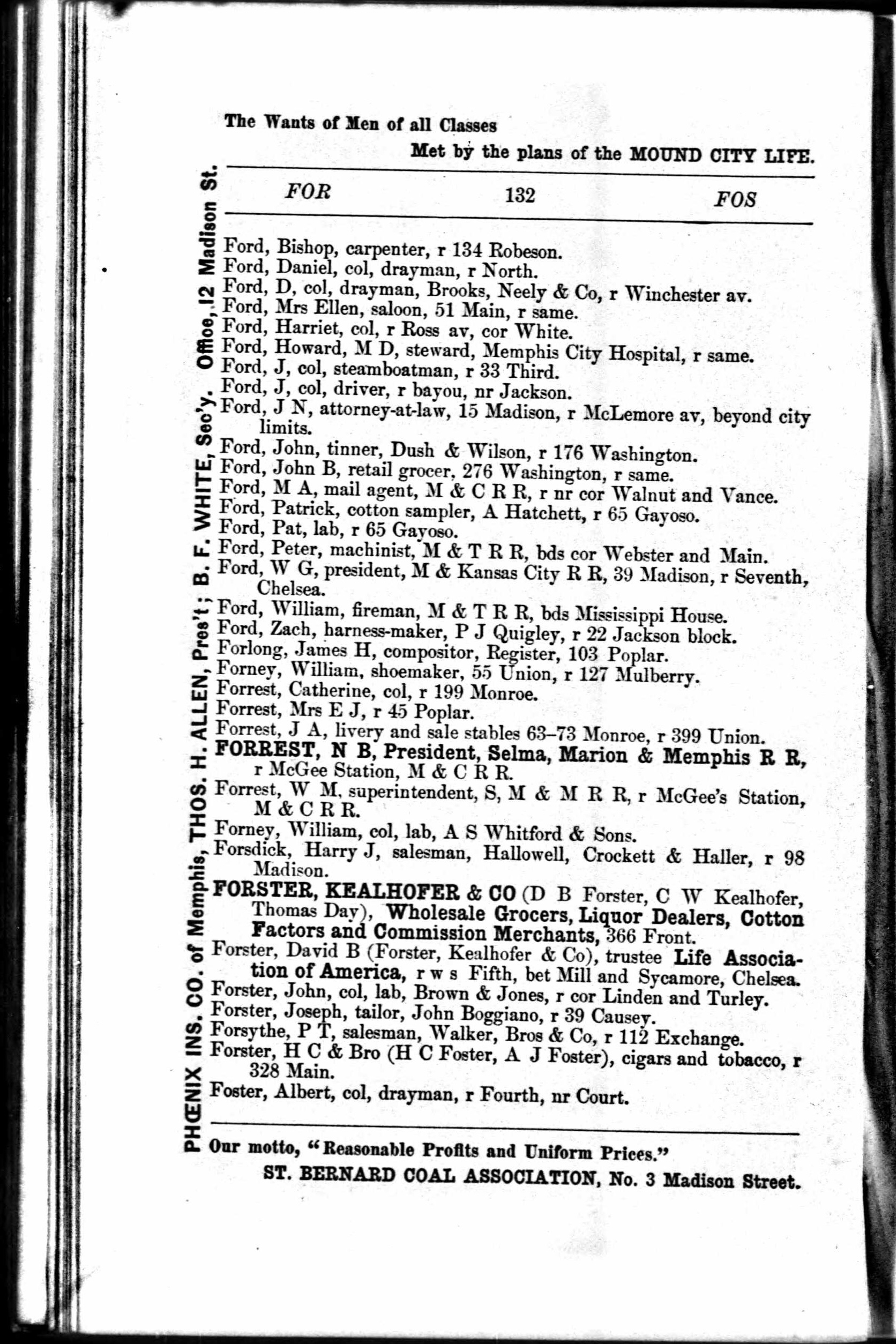
Catherine Forrest in Memphis city directory of 1874

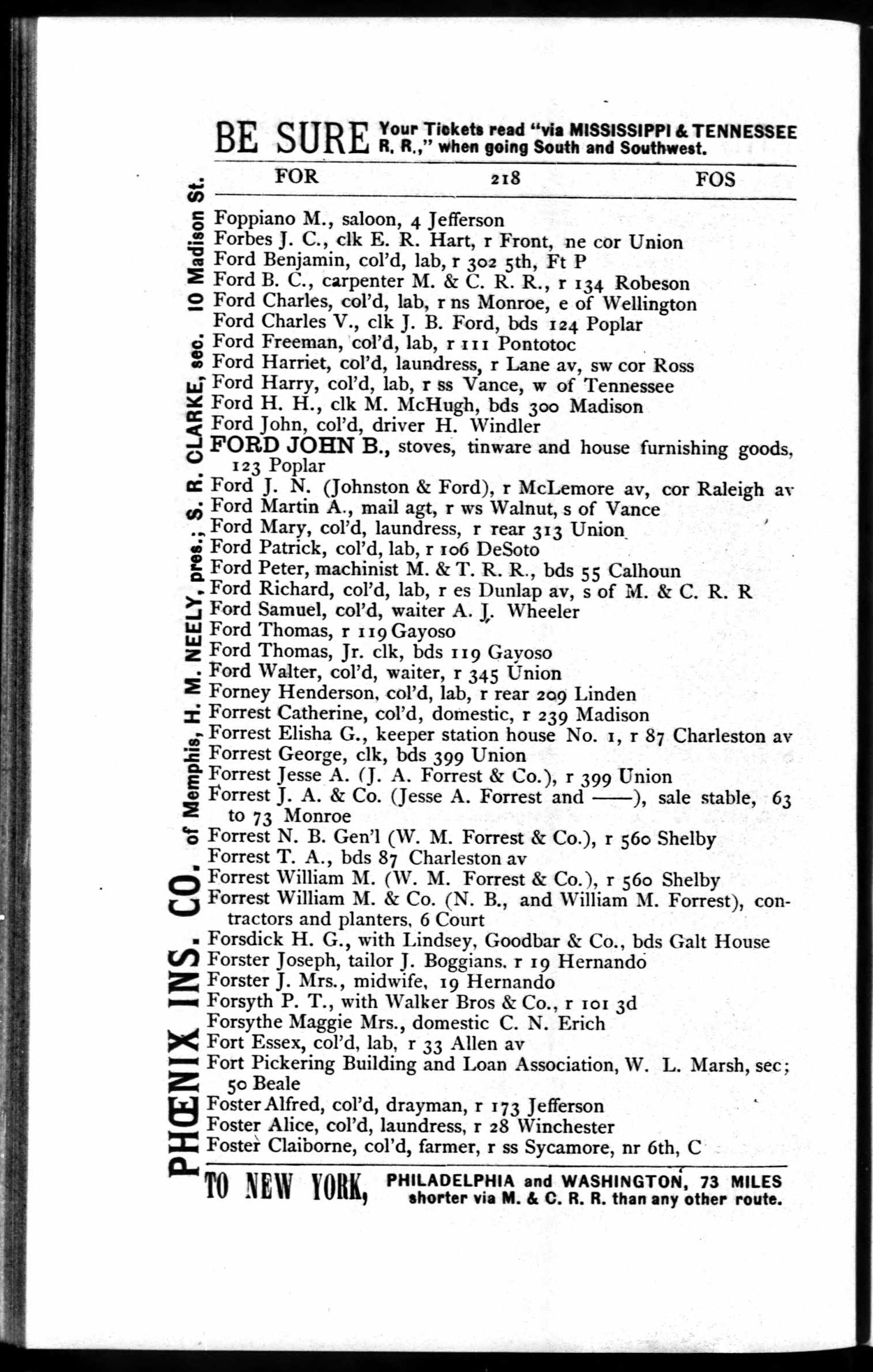
Catherine Forrest in Memphis city directory of 1877

== See also ==
- Shadow family
- List of white American slave traders who had mixed-race children with enslaved black women
