= List of white American slave traders who had mixed-race children with enslaved black women =

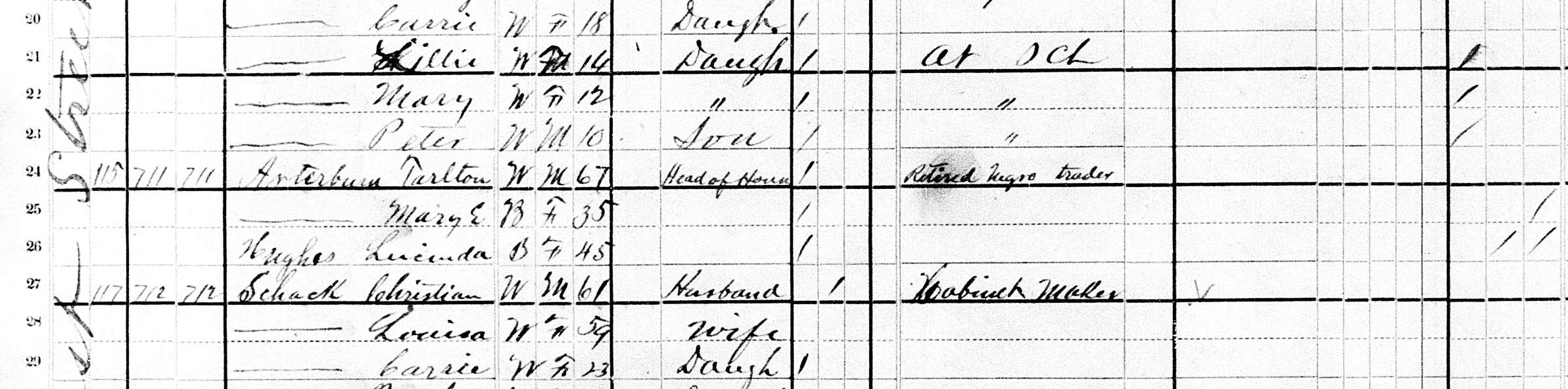
Census record of 1880, Louisville, Kentucky: Tarlton Arterburn, occupation "retired negro trader" shares a household with Mary E. Arterburn; Tarlton is classified as white, Mary is classified as black

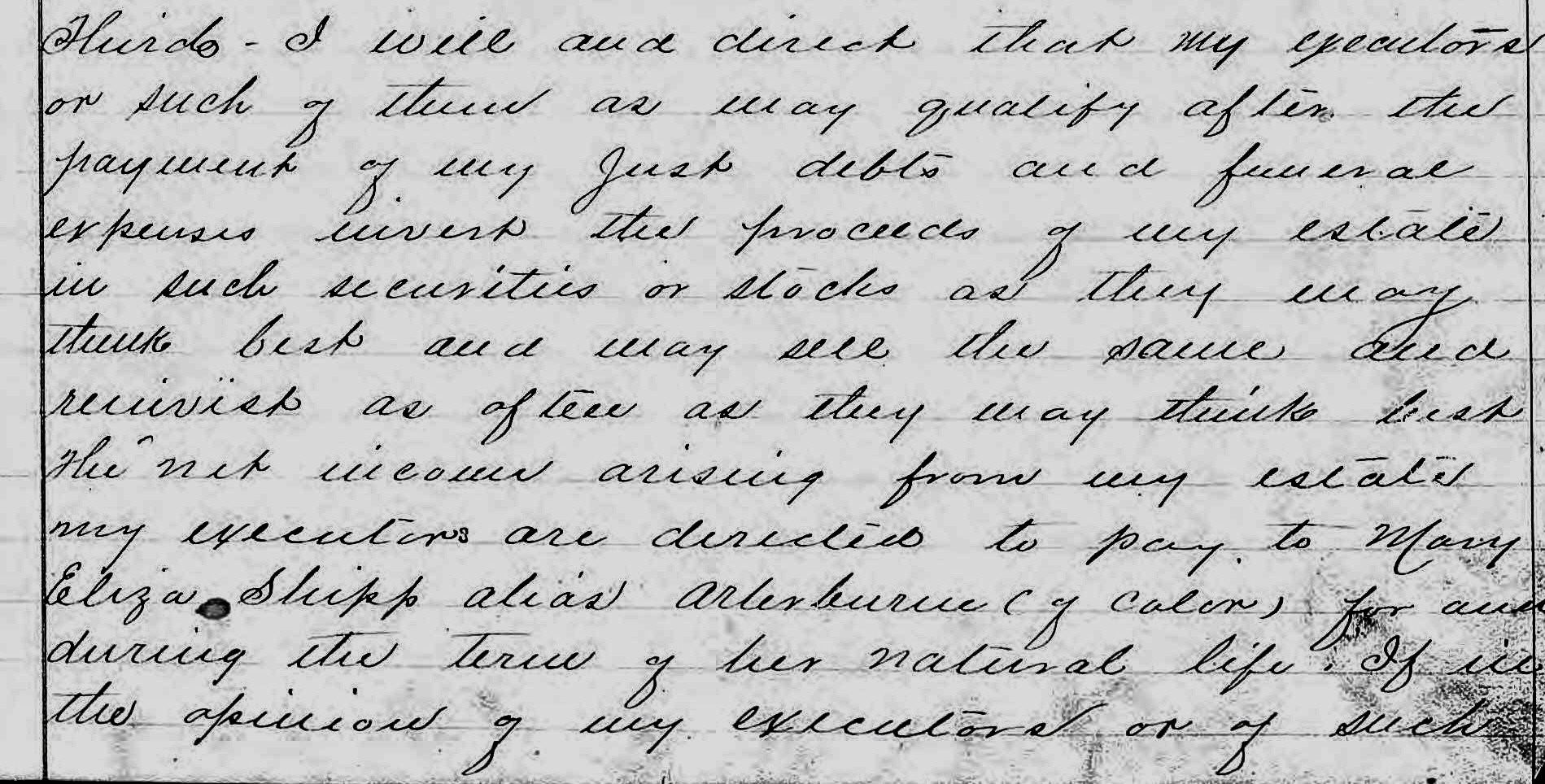
Arterburn left Mary everything in his will, directing that "the net income arising from my estate my executors are directed to pay to Mary Eliza Shipp alias Arterburn (of color) for and during the term of her natural life"

This is a list of white American slave traders who had mixed-raced children by black women they had at one time legally enslaved.

Historian Alexandra J. Finley asserts that sex trafficking inherent in American slavery sometimes resulted in long-term relationships, "Enslaved women sold for sex were not purchased to labor toward a tangible end product, such as cotton bolls, but they labored nonetheless, producing emotion, pleasure, and a sense of mastery in the person who enslaved them...In many cases, slave traders...sold the women they raped. In other cases the traders kept certain enslaved women with them for a number of years, or even for a lifetime, relying on these women for domestic, sexual, and socially reproductive labor." Slave traders who fathered biracial children were part of a widespread "racial and sexual double standard...in the slaveholding states [that] gave elite white men a free pass for their sexual relationships with black women, as long as the men neither flaunted nor legitimated such unions."

- Tarleton Arterburn
- Rice C. Ballard
- Edward Bush
- Hector Davis
- R. H. Dickinson
- Isaac Franklin
- Matthew Garrison
- William Goodwin
- John Hagan
- Robert Lumpkin
- Silas Omohundro
- Jourdan Saunders
- Jonathan M. Wilson

== See also ==
- Mary Lumpkin – American former slave and property owner
- Catharine (Tennessee) – Enslaved mother, b. c. 1835
- Reytory Angola – Black landowner in colonial New York
- Murder of Nancy Dickins during the Bolton–Dickens feud
- List of American slave traders
- Bibliography of the slave trade in the United States
- Samuel S. Boyd § Letters
