= Jordan Arterburn and Tarlton Arterburn =

19th-century American interstate slave traders

Jordan Arterburn
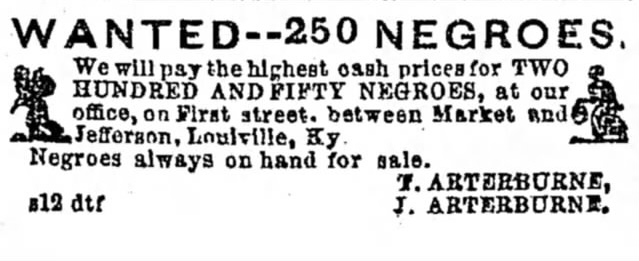
- "Wanted—250 Negroes" "Negroes always on hand for sale." (Louisville Daily Courier, December 20, 1859)
- Born: 1808; Kentucky, U.S.
- Died: 1875 (aged 66–67); Kentucky, U.S.
- Other names: Artreburn, Arterburne, J. Arterburn, Artibon
- Occupation: Slave trader
- Years active: 1839?–1863?

Tarlton Arterburn
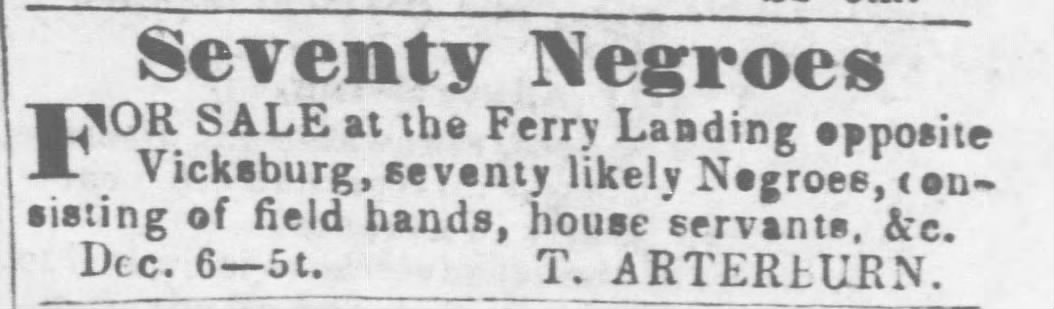
- "FOR SALE at the Ferry Landing opposite Vicksburg, seventy likely Negroes, consisting of field hands, house servants, &c." (The Weekly American Banner, Yazoo City, Mississippi, December 20, 1844)
- Born: 1810; Kentucky, U.S.
- Died: November 28, 1883 (aged 72–73); Kentucky, U.S.
- Other names: Tarleton, Artreburn, Arterburne, T. Arterburn
- Occupations: Slave trader, real estate agent
- Years active: 1839?–1863?

Jordan Arterburn (1808–1875) and Tarlton Arterburn (1810–1883) were brothers and interstate slave traders of the 19th-century United States. They typically bought enslaved people in their home state of Kentucky in the upper south, and then moved them to Mississippi in the lower south, where there was a constant demand for enslaved laborers on the plantations of King Cotton. Their "negroes wanted" advertisements ran in Louisville newspapers almost continuously from 1843 to 1859. In 1876, Tarlton Arterburn claimed they had taken profits of "30 to 40 percent a head" during their slave-trading days, and that Northern abolitionist Harriet Beecher Stowe had visited the Arterburn slave pen in Louisville while researching Uncle Tom's Cabin and A Key to Uncle Tom's Cabin. There is now a historical marker in Louisville at former site of the Arterburn slave jail, acknowledging the myriad abuses and human-rights violations that took place there.

== Early years ==
Jordan Arterburn and Tarlton Arterburn were the seventh and eighth sons of William Arterburn and Rachel Smoots, who came to Kentucky from the Shenandoah Valley of Virginia. The parents navigated the Ohio River on flatboats, and settled land near Beargrass Creek. The Arterburns were of East Indian descent through their paternal ancestor, Peter Arterburn, who was an indentured servant in Maryland born to a South Asian father and British mother.

It is unclear when the Arterburns entered the slave trade but in 1839 there was a letter waiting for Tarlton Arterburn at the post office in Natchez, Mississippi, the site of the infamous Forks of the Road slave market. Based on "negroes wanted" advertisements placed in newspapers beginning in 1843, Tarlton Arterburn was originally in partnership with Matthew Garrison, another slave trader based in Louisville. According to local historians, the Arterburns were known for their "iron-barred coops." Slaves to be shipped south from Louisville were chained to one another and "marched up Main Street to board the boats in Portland to be shipped to New Orleans."

In 1844 the Jefferson County Court considered whether a trader named Arterburn could hold or sell an enslaved man named Frederick who had made a down payment on purchasing his freedom from his former owner, Crawford.

On February 17, 1845, a baby named Mary Eliza was born in Kentucky. When Mary Eliza died 86 years later in Louisville, Kentucky of la grippe and senility, her 1931 death certificate listed Margaret Shipp as her mother and Tarlton Arterburn as her father.

Beginning in 1845, the Arterburns began running a "series of advertisements which ran for several years" seeking to purchase "100 negroes for the Southern market, for which we will pay the highest prices." In 1845, Tarleton Arterburn advertised 70 "field hands, house servants" to be sold at the "Ferry Landing opposite Vicksburg." T. Arterburn was a registered voter in Vicksburg, Mississippi in February 1846. In November 1846 he placed an advertisement offering "30 YOUNG and likely NEGROES for sale, consisting of men, women and boys and girls, field hands and house servants, and two good blacksmiths" to be sold on Grove street near Washington street in Vicksburg. In John B. Jegli's Louisville, New-Albany, Jeffersonville, Shippingport and Portland directory for both 1845–46 and 1847–48, Jordan Arterburn, "negro trader" was resident at 35 1st Street in Louisville.

At the time of the 1850 census, Jordan and Tarlton Arteburn shared a household in the second district of Louisville; Jordan's listed occupation was "negro dealer."

== Freedom seekers and Harriet Beecher Stowe ==
On Tuesday, August 24, 1852, seven enslaved men staged what was known as a "stampede," or mass escape, from the slave pen of the "Messrs. Arterburn." The Louisville Daily Courier wrote "We suppose they are 'pre-lying,' or lying out in some of the cornfields in the county." The freedom seekers were said to be wearing "heavy bracelets," meaning cast-iron shackles. On Saturday, August 28 it was reported that two of the seven freedom seekers were recaptured and would be returned to Arterburn in Louisville: "A party in pursuit came up with five of the slaves 15 miles beyond Jeffersonville, and commanded them to surrender, instead of which they ran off. Two shots were fired, wounding Luther, a smart daring fellow, for whose apprehension $250 reward is offered, and bringing down another of the party. The first, though much hurt, still managed to get away, but the other gave up. He was wounded in the legs with small shot. The other negro that was caught was Jim, who was found in a hay stack. They crossed the river at Harrod's creek. It is thought one of the seven is still in the neighborhood of this city." The ultimate fate of Luther and compatriots is unknown.

When interviewed by a newspaper writer in 1876, Tarlton Arterburn said he had once started reading, but had never finished, Uncle Tom's Cabin because "I was reading it once, just after it came out, when I was told of the escape of seven of our negroes. I dashed the book against the wall, and never looked it up again, as the leaves went wide apart." Apparently it was believed in Louisville that Arterburn's slave pen was the inspiration for early chapters of Uncle Tom's Cabin. There is no clear-cut reference to the Arterburns in either the novel or the non-fiction polemical A Key to Uncle Tom's Cabin, but Uncle Tom, the main character, was sold south from Kentucky. When interviewed in 1876, on the occasion of the demolition of his old slave pen Tarlton Arterburn claimed that Stowe and a male companion had visited the pen while researching her book:

She and some gentleman called at our place. The pen was inclosed in high brick walls, and situated here on First, near Jefferson, east side of the street. We always had from ten to a hundred negroes in the pen. When Mrs Stowe called there was a goodly number of negroes on hand, exactly how many I do not now know...She said that she wanted to purchase a likely young woman to take back East, I suspected her real purpose was to examine the inside a of slave-pen but kept quiet and called a bright mulatto girl to whom I gave the wink and said 'This lady wishes to take you to New York where you will be free and have a good time. Show that pretty foot of yours and tell her whether you wish to go or not.' The mulatto put out her foot which was a very pretty one and remarked, 'I guess de lady has a good home for me in de east but I sorter 'spects 'Cinda 'drather stay in Kentuck.'"

In Arterburn's telling 'Cinda then sang a few lines of "My Old Kentucky Home," a song explicitly about family separation in American slavery. According to a recent history of slavery in Kentucky, "It is important to point out, however, that if we are to accept Arterburn's account of an enslaved woman singing 'My Old Kentucky Home' to Harriet Beecher Stowe, it must have happened years after Stowe's manuscript was completed. The song was published by Stephen Foster in 1853, the year after Uncle Tom's Cabin was published." In Emily Bingham's 2022 book about the history of the song she wrote that Arterburn used this anecdote to "exonerate himself, mock abolitionists, and defend slavery as a benevolent institution."

In 1854, Jordan and Tarlton Arterburn sold Ann, Lovinia and Lucinda from the estate of John G. Warren, with the approval of the county chancery court.

In February 1856, a Louisville resident name C. Crutchfield wrote to planter and former slave trade Rice C. Ballard that upon discovering the self-emancipation of Big Lewis (who had escaped with help from the Underground Railroad via the frozen-over Ohio River), Crutchfield had "immediately" sold his wife and children to "Alterburn."

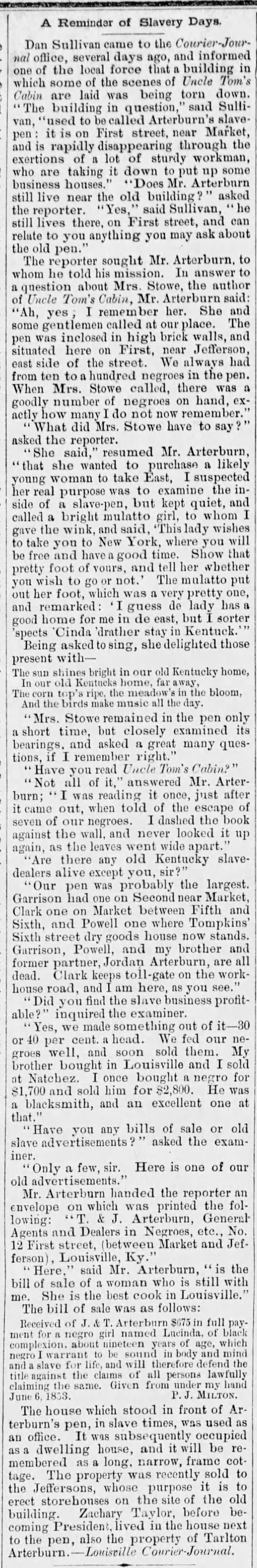
"A Reminder of Slavery Days" Tarlton Arterburn interview with Louisville Courier-Journal, 1876

== Last sales and the American Civil War ==
In March 1857, the Natchez Bulletin published a notice that promised "NEGROES COMING. Tarlton ARTERBURN & CO. will arrive in few days with 60 CHOICE NEGROES consisting of FIELD HANDS, BLACKSMITHS, HOUSE SERVANTS, &c, being the most complete assortment ever offered in this market." J. Arterburn, "negro trader," was resident in Louisville per the 1858 city directory.

Jordan Arterburn was appointed to be a delegate to the state Democratic Party convention in representing the third and fourth wards of Louisville for the 1859 convention in La Grange and the 1860 convention in Frankfort. In June 1860, J. and T. Arterburn paid the executors of James D. Breckinridge US$2,100 (equivalent to $75,250 in 2025) for a lot fronting Caldwell Street in the Breckinridge's Addition neighborhood of Louisville. At the time of 1860 census J. and T. Arterburn shared a household in the third ward of Louisville, had real estate valued at US$4,000 (equivalent to $143,333 in 2025), and personal property worth US$36,000 (equivalent to $1,290,000 in 2025). In 1861 Tarleton and Jordan Arterburn were listed in the Louisville city directory as "slave dealers." In September 1862, "Wm. C. and T. and J. Arterburn" paid US$20,000 (equivalent to $645,000 in 2025) for 100 acres (40 ha) of land in the vicinity of Louisville. In December 1862 Jordan and Tarlton Arterburn were elected officers of Abraham Lodge No. 8 of the Masonic temple of Louisville.

On March 20, 1866, a formerly enslaved woman named Emily Churchill filled an affidavit with the Freedmen's Bureau. She stated that she had been born enslaved to the Arterburn family around 1826 and had lived at the Arterburn farm until July 4, 1865. She swore a statement that she had encountered Harrison Arterburn, oldest brother of Jordan and Tarleton, on the road from the Arterburn plantation. He had accused her of stealing, threatened to slit her 10-year-old son's throat, punched and knocked down both her and her blind four-year-old son, threw her only possession from the Arterburn homestead (a chair) over a fence into a field, threatened to slit her throat, and then "desisted...and tried to persuade her to go back home with him."

== Antebellum era, death, and legacy ==
At the time of the 1870 census, Jordan and Tarlton Arterburn shared a household with a number of others. Jordan Arterburn's listed occupation was "retired negro trader," and Tarlton's was "real estate agent." Jordan Arterburn died in 1875, when he was about 67 years old. At the time of 1880 census, Tarlton Arterburn was identified as a "retired negro trader." He shared a household with a 35-year-old black woman named Mary E. Arterburn (his daughter) and a 45-year-old black woman named Lucinda Hughes. In 1853 the Arterburn brothers had paid a man named P. J. Milton $675 for an enslaved woman named Lucinda. Lucinda Hughes remained in Tarleton Arterburn's household after emancipation. Arterburn described her as "the best cook in Louisville." Tarleton Arterburn appeared in the 1883 city directory as a resident of 313 1st Street. He shared a household with "Arterburn, Mary (col'd) domestic 313 1st." Arterburn died in 1883, with a last will and testament that bequeathed his entire estate to "Mary Eliza Shipp alias Arterburn (of color)." A report about Tarlton Arterburn's funeral appeared in the Louisville Courier-Journal:

The funeral of Mr. Tarleton Arterburn took place from his late residence, on First Street, yesterday afternoon. He was buried by the Knights Templar, at his mother's old place in Jefferson county. Mr. Arterburn was well-known here; a man of strong likes and dislikes, one who never forgot a favor or an insult; generous to a fault, and caring little for what others said about him, he has been a marked man in this city for years. He was passionately attached to an older brother, Harrison Arterburn, who died a few weeks ago. From the shock of his brother's death Mr. Arterburn never recovered. He took to his bed a few days afterward and seemed not to wish to live. ¶ He belonged to a numerous and respectable family. His brother, Crawford Arterburn, is the richest farmer in Jefferson county, and owns hundreds of acres of the finest land in Kentucky. Tarleton Arterburn was never intended for a money saver; but he died well-to-do. A great crowd of his old friends followed the body from this city to his last resting place.

Items offered at Tarleton Arterburn's estate sale included a "good brick house" of 10 rooms, a building lot 28 feet by 102 1/2 feet, bedsteads, carpets, tables, wardrobes, bureaus, chairs, "also one fine Gold Watch."

Also in the 1880s, a woman named Kide Ann Brown placed a family reunification ad in the Christian Recorder that documented her sale by "Arterburn & Garrison" when she was about 13 or 14 years old:

INFORMATION WANTED OF MY FATHER William Brown, and my two brothers, George and Kenry Clary Brown, whom I left in Louisville, KY, some thirty odd years ago. Brother Henry Clay, and myself belonged at that time to a merchant by the name of John D. Baker. I was sold to traders Arterburn and Garrison, when a girl about 13 or 14 years of age. Any information of my father or brothers will be most thankful received. Address, Kide Ann Brown, care of Alice L. Brown, Weedville, Miss., Wilkinson County.

The state of Kentucky has placed a commemorative marker honoring the survivors and victims of the Arterburn slave trading business at the site where their slave jail once stood.

== See also ==
- List of American slave traders
- List of white American slave traders who had mixed-race children with enslaved black women
- History of Louisville, Kentucky
- Beargrass Creek State Nature Preserve
- National Underground Railroad Freedom Center
