= Louisville Hotel =

Near Ohio River, Kentucky, U.S. (1833–1938)

Coordinates: 38.25687°N 85.76061°W

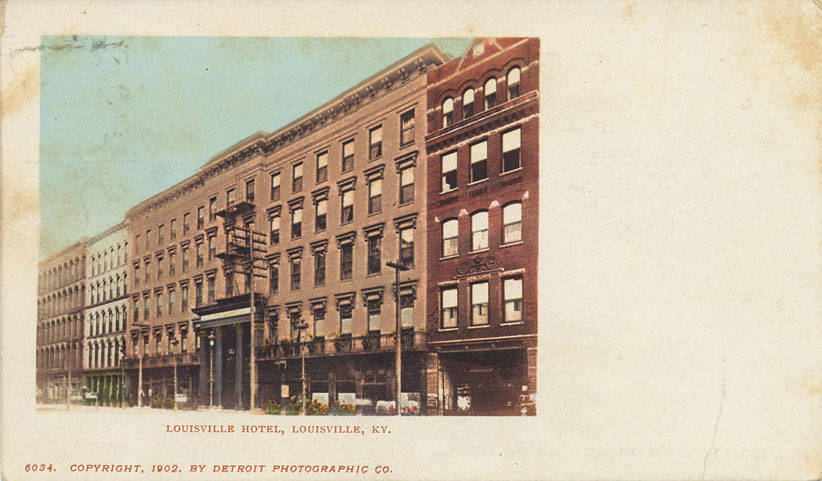
Louisville Hotel, c. 1900

The Louisville Hotel on Main Street, between Sixth and Seventh, in Louisville, Kentucky, United States was a major hotel of that city in the 19th and early 20th centuries, originally built in a Greek Revival style from a design by Hugh Roland. The hotel was constructed in 1833, and survived until 1938, with the building enduring as a derelict shell until it was demolished in 1949 to make way for a parking lot.

== History ==
The hotel opened in 1833. The original footprint of the building was 15,000 square feet (1,400 m^{2}). The entrance steps led to a rotunda measuring 22 feet (6.7 m) in diameter, which was lit by a skylight, and from which parlors, barrooms, and baggage rooms radiated and were immediately accessible. The main floor hosted small businesses, including a stagecoach depot, a cigar shop, a saloon, clothiers, and a "lottery office." In its heyday the hotel was patronized by "planters, soldiers, military leaders, and theater people," and was admired for its "lustrous black-walnut paneling, cut-glass chandelier, and large oil paintings." Louisville slave trader Matthew Garrison could be reached at the hotel in 1841.

On January 26, 1853, the building caught fire and "before the flames could be arrested the whole front building was destroyed except the lower floor. The loss is estimated at US$10,000 (equivalent to $377,960 in 2024)." An 1853 expansion called the "Sixth Street ell" in later years became known as the first Seelbach Hotel. The building originally had 10 Ionic columns that were removed during this remodel. During the course of the renovation, a wall in the older section of the building collapsed, killing a construction worker, and a homeless child (who had apparently been scavenging for firewood). After the completion, in 1856, of the remodel designed by architect Isaiah Rogers (under direction of proprietors Kean, Stedman & Co.) the hotel had expanded from 60 to 220 rooms within five stories.

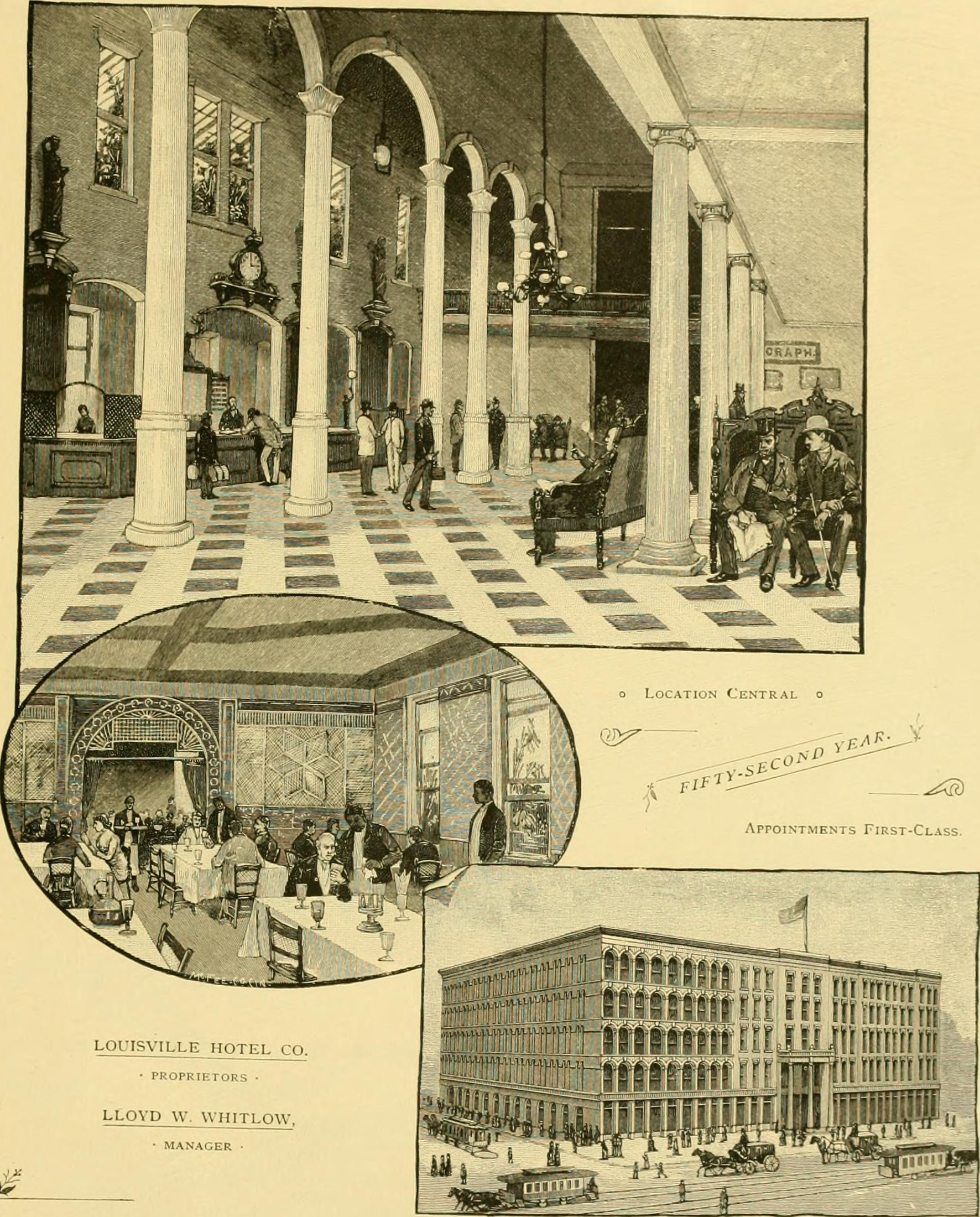
Louisville Hotel scenes c. 1886

Circa 1860 the Louisville Hotel had 23 employees who were "hired out" slaves—their wages, in whole or in part, typically accrued to their legal owners. A "grand reception" was held at the Louisville Hotel in September 1866 when Louisville was a stop on U.S. President Andrew Johnson's Swing Around the Circle electioneering tour. After a redecoration in 1874, "through the windows immediately behind the statues are seen fine specimen plants of magnolias, oleanders, and myrtles in the court."

The building was hit by the 1890 tornado, which ripped off the roof. Residents of the building next door suffered several casualties. In the late 19th century, declining riverboat traffic led to a decline in the hotel's fortunes. As of 1915, the hotel had 300 guest rooms. The Louisville Hotel was closed to business in 1938, and in 1939 several associated outbuildings were demolished. The Louisville Courier-Journal described the building's condition in 1941:

Boxes and scraps fill the lobby and the famous chandelier is gone, having fallen and been destroyed several years ago, we were told. The thick and rich carpets, over which leading Americans and, later, thousands of traveling salesmen walked as the hotel dropped from a mecca for the elite to a commercial hotel, are badly worn and filled with dust. The famous and valuable art-glass windows, shipped here from Europe years ago, are still in place, but badly worn from years of neglect. The solid brass railing, formerly a picture of beauty, is so thick with dust that it can't be identified.

== See also ==
- Galt House § Original Galt House
