= John Hagan (slave trader) =

New Orleans merchant (d. 1856)

John Hagan (died June 8, 1856) was a well-known American interstate slave trader who operated slave jails in both Charleston and New Orleans, as well as maintaining strong business and personal ties to the Richmond slave markets. He partnered with his brothers Hugh Hagan and Alexander Hagan, as well as with his maternal uncles, Hugh McDonald and Alexander McDonald. John Hagan was also a cotton factor, meaning he ran a cotton brokerage and de facto private bank and business office for cotton plantation owners.

According to historian Walter Johnson, "John Hagan's yearly routine began in Charleston with slave buying during June and July; he continued in Virginia and then was back in Charleston in September, still buying, before traveling to New Orleans in October." Hagan was both a shipper and consignee (intended recipient) of enslaved people who were on the Creole in 1841. Before he died in 1856 he worked assiduously to manumit a young enslaved woman from Virginia named Lucy Ann Cheatam, and her two children, Frederika Bremer "Dolly" Cheatam and William Lowndes Cheatam. He also provided bequests of cash and real estate for her in two versions of his will. Per historian Alexandra J. Finley, these children, and two others who died young, were almost certainly Hagan's biological offspring.

== See also ==
- List of American slave traders
- List of white American slave traders who had mixed-race children with enslaved black women
