= Matthew Garrison (slave trader) =

Louisville, Kentucky slave trader (~1809–1863)

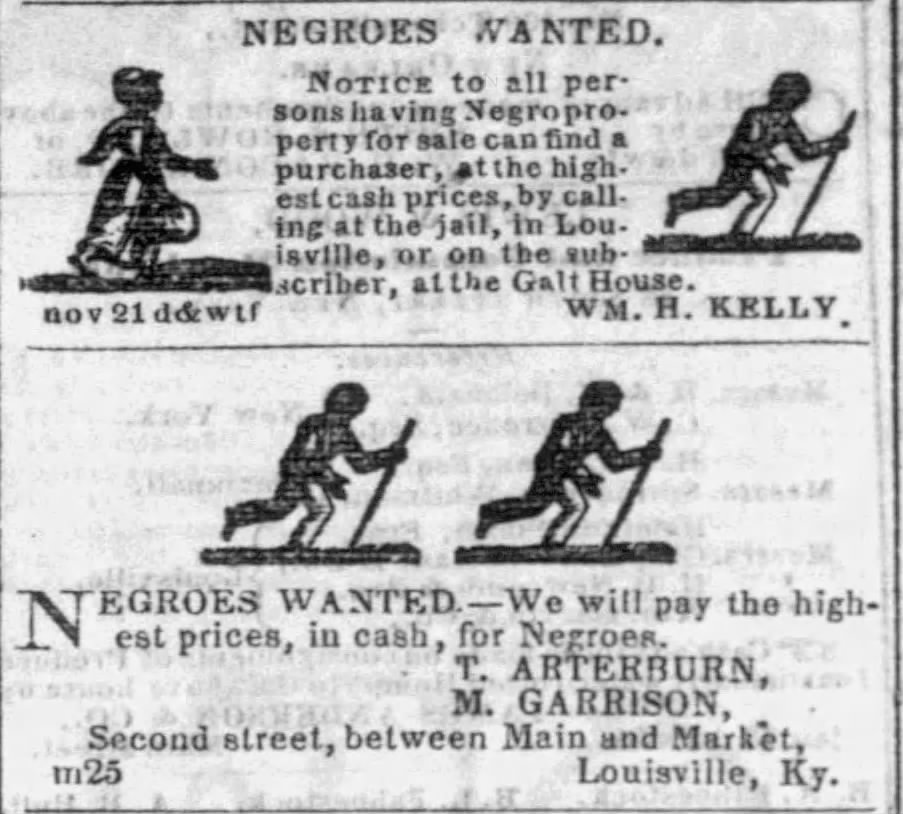
- "Negroes wanted" newspaper ads published on July 4, 1844
- Born: c. 1809; Virginia
- Died: July 29, 1863; Louisville, Kentucky, U.S.
- Other names: Mathew Garrison, Madison Garrison (Bibb)
- Occupation: Slave trader

Matthew Garrison (Note: Garrison's first name is sometimes recorded as Mathew with one T.) (c. 1809 – July 29, 1863) was an American interstate slave trader who bought in Kentucky and sold in Louisiana and Mississippi from the 1830s into the 1860s. He ran one of the major slave jails in antebellum Louisville, Kentucky. Garrison left his entire estate to two women of color and their combined six children by him.

== Background and early career ==
Garrison was born about 1809 in Virginia. Little else is known about his family background or upbringing, but he seems to have started slave trading by approximately age 30. There was a letter waiting for a "Garrison, M" in Vicksburg, Mississippi in February 1838.

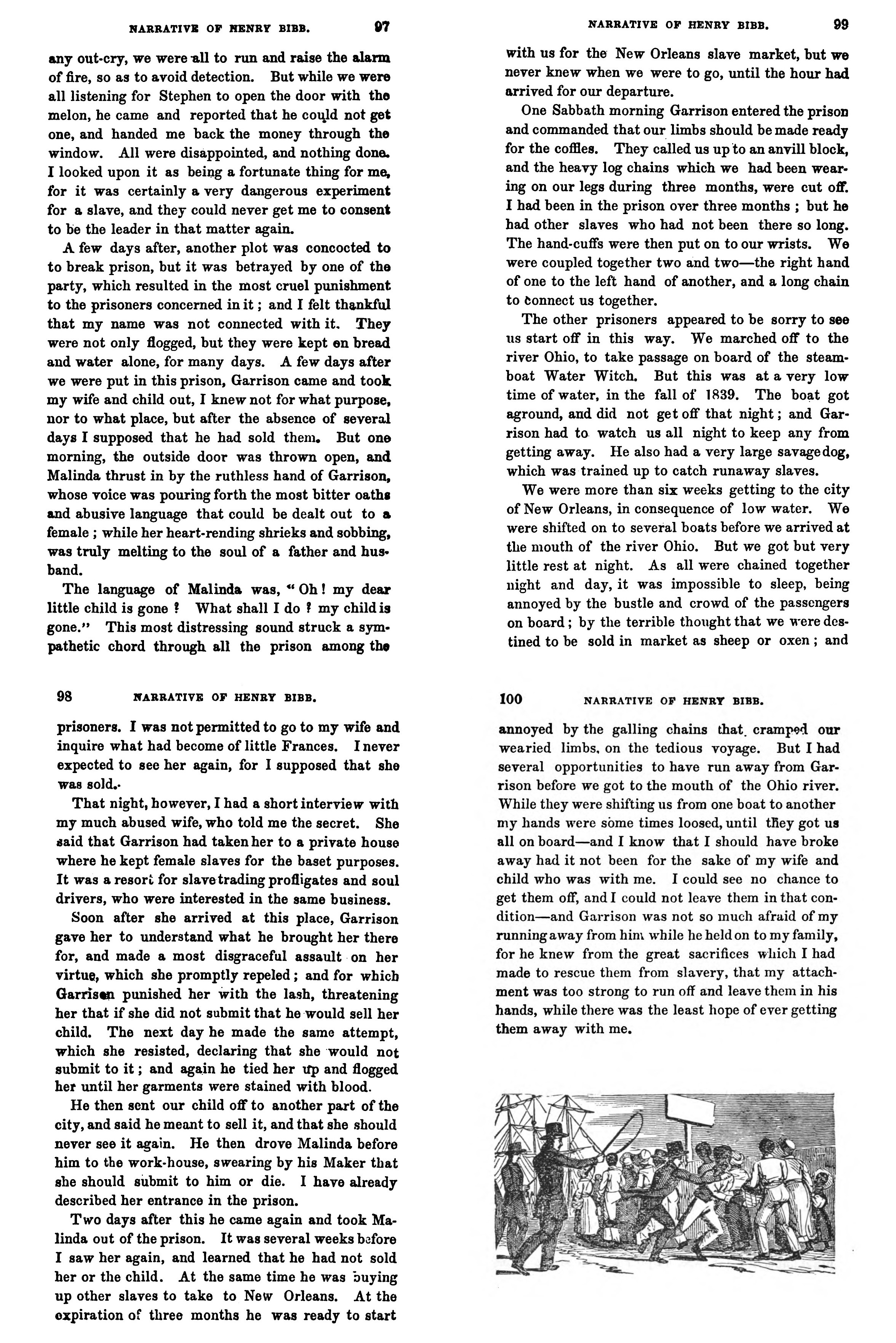
Matthew Garrison took Malinda Bibb from the Louisville Workhouse to a private building designated for sexual abuse of female slaves

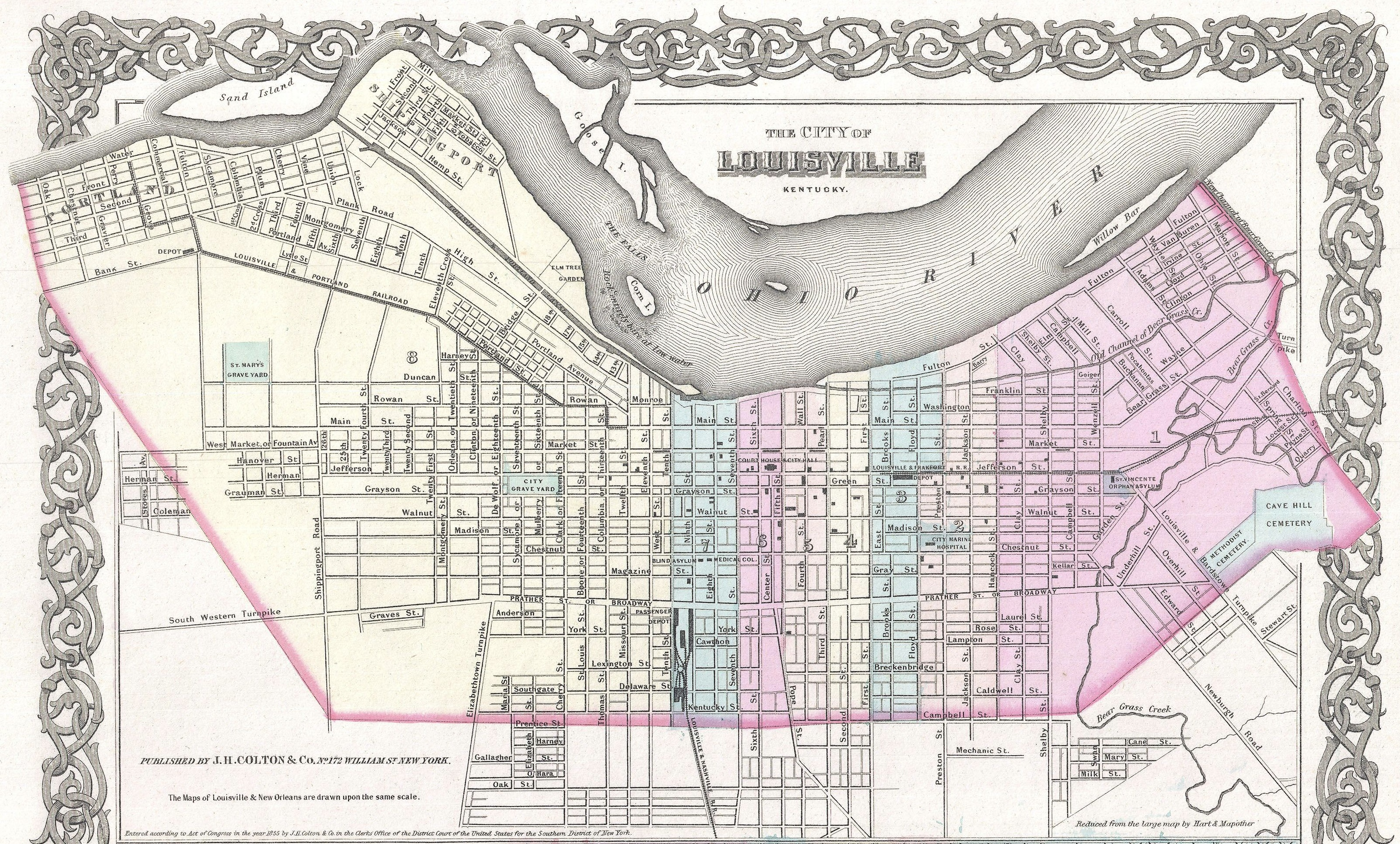
Louisville mapped in 1855; Garrison's jail was in close proximity to riverboat traffic and railroad lines; the workhouse was at Quarry Road near Cave Hill Cemetery

Garrison was certainly trading 1839, at which time Henry Bibb was captured by a mob while attempting to rescue his wife and daughter from slavery. Matthew Garrison stowed Bibb in the Louisville Workhouse, where "about half the inmates were white. Both the whites, who were criminals, and the slaves, being held for 'safe keeping,' wore heavy chains and worked cutting or breaking stones." According to Bibb, Garrison took Malinda to "a private house where he kept female slaves for the basest purposes. It was a resort for slave-trading profligates and soul drivers, who were interested in the same business." Garrison tried to rape Malinda two days in a row, but when she fought him off two days in a row he had her flogged and then sent her back to the workhouse, taking away her child at the same time. As retold by the Kentucky Historical Society, "Garrison separated Bibb from his wife and child, and Bibb assumed they had been sold south. Garrison returned Malinda a few days later but without Mary Frances. The grieved parents believed their child had been sold, but to their surprise, the slave dealer returned Mary Frances after several weeks. After three months in a Louisville slave pen, Bibb and his family went to New Orleans in chains." Garrison used the steamboat Water Witch to transport the Bibbs south. The trip took an unusually long six weeks since the river was running low, and Bibb recalled, "We got but very little rest at night. As all were chained together night and day, it was impossible to sleep, being annoyed by the bustle and crowd of the passengers on board; by the terrible thought that we were destined to be sold in market as sheep or oxen." (Note: The Water Witch was a single-engine sidewheel steamer. The passenger cabin had no staterooms. As of 1840 the Water Witch was piloted by Henry Lee and William Hale. She was destroyed with all hands by a storm in Galveston Bay in 1842.) Garrison initially attempted to sell his captives in Vicksburg but, being unsuccessful, brought them down to New Orleans where they were kept on St. Joseph street (located roughly between Tivoli Circle and the waterfront road called New Levee), where the showroom of slaves was open daily at 10 a.m. The family was kept there for months, until they were eventually purchased by a man named Francis E. Whitfield, who owned a cotton plantation in Claiborne Parish, Louisiana, 50 miles (80 km) above the mouth of the Red River. Whitfield later resold Malinda and Mary Frances. Bibb never saw them again.

== 1840s ==
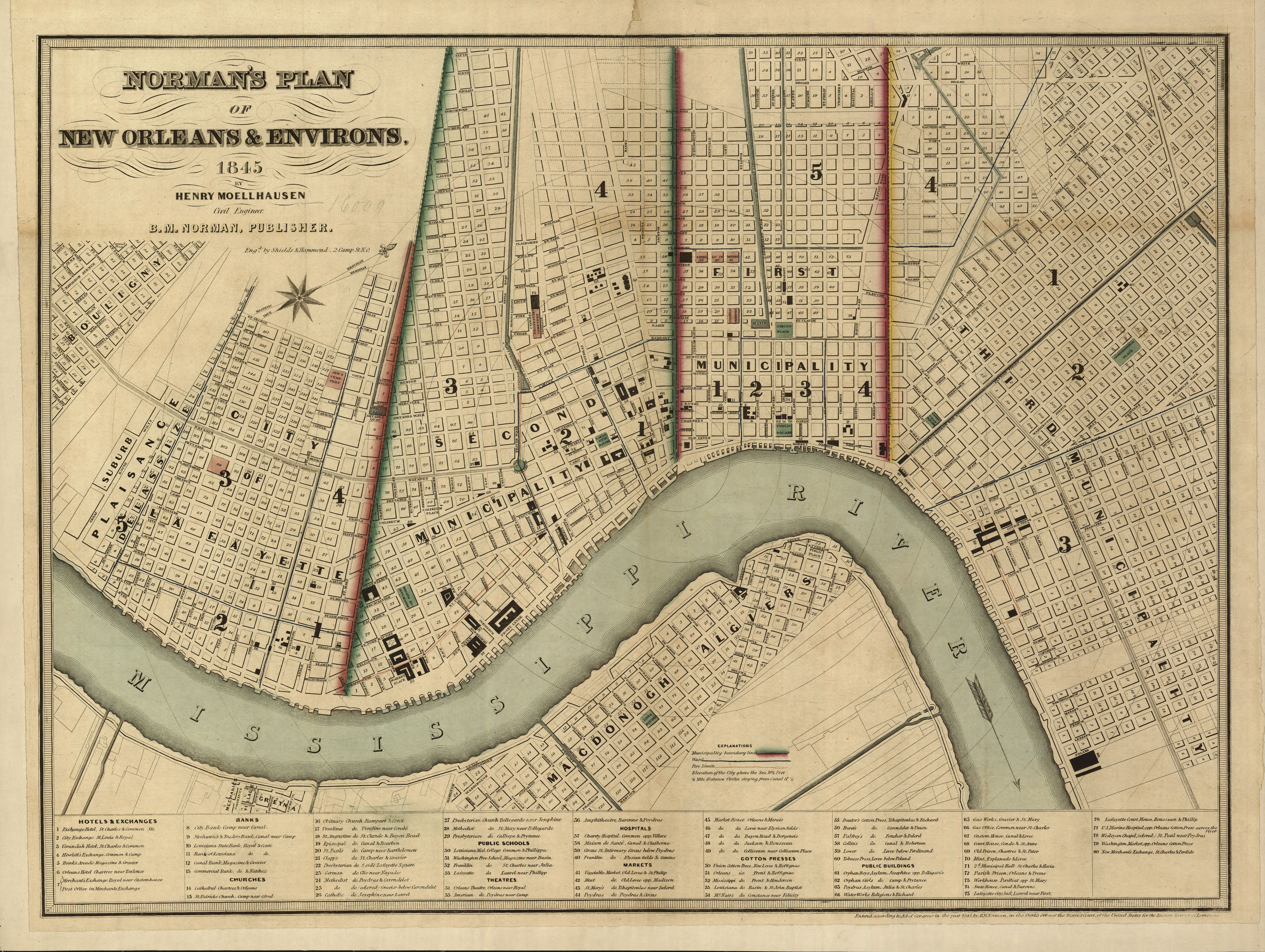
1845 map of New Orleans—Garrison's stand in 1840 and 1841 probably stood near the City Hotel and Hewlett's Exchange, at Camp and Common, close to Canal Street

In May 1840 Garrison was selling slaves in New Orleans, advertising, "Notice to planters: Just received and for sale at my yard, 152 Camp street, being the yard formerly kept by Samuel Hite, a number of likely SLAVES. Among them are two blacksmiths, No. 1, that can be warranted equal to any in the state, and a few first quality house servants." In April 1841 Garrison was again selling in New Orleans, offering "valuable house servants and young negro boys" from 152 Camp Street. In July 1841 Garrison advertised "I wish to purchase twenty-five negroes and will pay cash for them. I may be found at the Louisville Hotel."

Garrison was partners with Tarlton Arterburn in 1843–1844, according to newspaper advertisements and the city directory of those years. Along with the Arterburn brothers, William H. Kelly, Thomas Powell, and William Talbott, Garrison emerged by the end of the 1840s as one of the leading full-time slave traders of Louisville and environs. Many of these men operated private slave jails to hold people until they could be shipped down the Ohio River to the Mississippi River and thence to great slave markets of Mississippi and Louisiana. In May 1845, Garrison was working in New Orleans, no doubt wrapping up the trading season for the year before planters returned to their lands for the summer. In August 1845 Garrison was advertising his "slave jail" to Kentuckians as a local resource, and seeking to buy slaves for resale both locally and out of state.

== 1850s ==
A man who lived in Louisville in the 1850s, when he was a boy, recalled the city in that decade, and the curiosity that was Garrison's slave pen:

In the 1850s it was busy thriving city of some 40,000 to 50,000 people. Its wharves were lined with steamboats from every river point; its streets echoed with the rumble of six-mule team "Conestoga" wagons loaded with the farm products of the up-country "hinterland," and the bugle blasts of the daily mail stage coaches. Dominated by the trenchant editorial pens of the late George D. Prentice of the Journal (Whig) and Walter N. Haldeman of the Courier (Democrat), it was the center of political thought and activity for the Border States...Another thing that intrigued the boys was 'Garrison's Nigger Pen' on Second Street, between Main and Market. When a Kentucky Nigger became unruly his master would threaten to sell him "South." If he continued unruly he sent him to Matthew Garrison's place to be taken to New Orleans. When a sufficient number accumulated they were handcuffed in twos and driven to Portland and shipped by boat to New Orleans to be sold.

At the time of the 1850 U.S. federal census, Garrison lived in Louisville and reported owning real estate valued at $7,500. The slave schedules of the 1850 U.S. census provide a window inside Garrison's jail. On enumeration day, September 2, 1850, Garrison legally owned 27 people: 14 female, 13 male; 20 racially classified as black, seven racially classified as mulatto. Eight were considered "fugitives from the state" meaning they were runaways or otherwise in legal limbo. If they were not claimed within a certain period of time, Garrison would be permitted to resell them. The oldest resident of the pen was a 37-year-old black female. The youngest residents were a pair of one-year-old mulatto baby boys, likely twins, who were two of the eight fugitives from the state. Ten of the 27 inmates in Garrison's jail that September day in 1850 were children under 13. (Note: The instructions to census enumerators for column six of the 1850 slave schedule were that they should record "in figures, opposite the name of the slave owner, the number of slaves who, having absconded within the year, have not been recovered". For another instance of a slave trader having a number of "fugitives from the state" on the slave schedules, see Simeon G. Eddins in 1860.)

In February 1851, Garrison visited Natchez, the biggest slave market in Mississippi. In 1852 Matthew Garrison was charged with violating the local slops maintenance ordinance in Louisville, but "The court stated that the law was not perfect, and that some arrangement should be made for the disposal of slops by ordinance, or otherwise, that it will be a grevious tax to compel poor people to carry off their slops. The case was dismissed." In April 1854 Garrison submitted a bill for "boarding slaves" to the county chancery court during a proceeding where an inheritance of slaves was in dispute. In 1855 he advertised a 30-year-old man qualified to work as a "whitewasher and plasterer" who was also "a good gardener and a very superior dining room servant." In July 1855 Garrison and someone named Reynolds were called to court for "negro dealing without a license".

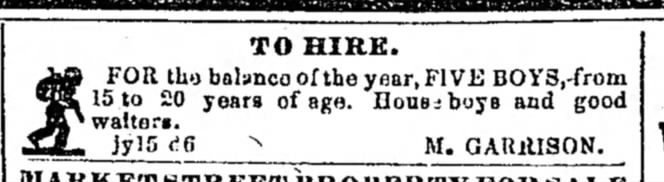
This ad placed by Garrison is an example of the practice of hiring out of slaves in the United States (The Louisville Daily Courier, July 16, 1853)

In May 1856, a man named Moses Hundley sued for his freedom based on the terms of the will of his former owner John Hundley, and according to a University of North Carolina Greensboro database of slavery-related court petitions, "He further reveals that he is currently being held in a Louisville jail called 'a Pen' by either George S. Miller or Mathew Garrison. The petitioner charges that Garrison is 'a trader in Negroes and that it is the purpose and intention of both or one of the defts to carry him or have him carried to some of the southern states, there to be sold into slavery.' Moses charges that any claim to him as a slave and his present confinement is unlawful. He 'asks a decree declaring him a free man & for all other proper relief'." The petition was partially granted. In 1859, "Chas. De Forrester and Dr. Lyle were in court upon a warrant, sued out by M. Garrison, charging them with defacing his property."

Also in the 1850s, Garrison fathered several children by two different enslaved women and prepared a will manumitting them upon his death and bequeathing to the children real estate and money for their education. Garrison explicitly excluded his surviving siblings from receiving his estate, and made a point to discourage them from contesting the will with the statement that "the estate which I have, has been accumulated entirely by my individual industry and economy".

== American Civil War ==
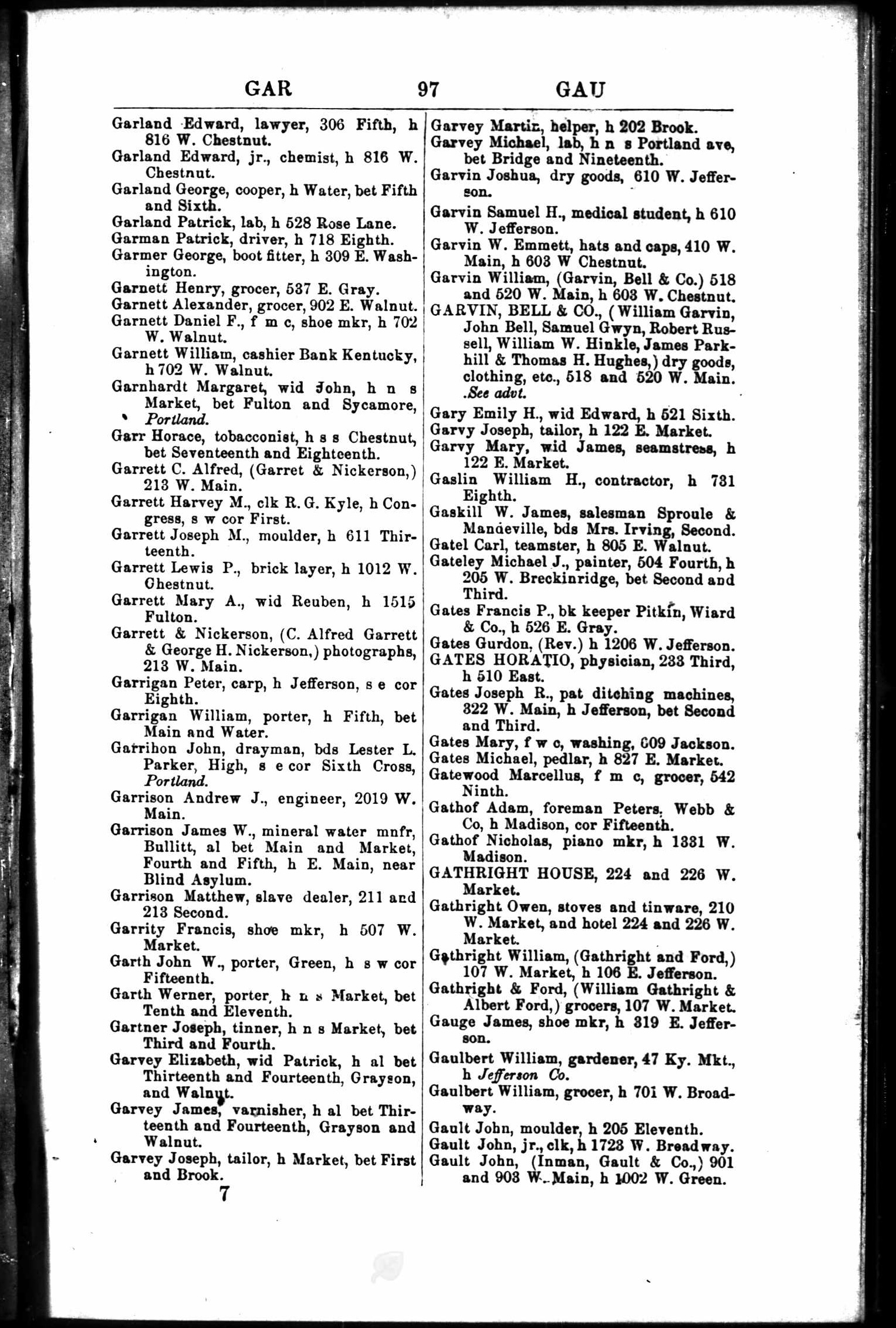
"Matthew Garrison, slave dealer, 211 and 213 Second" in 1861 Louisville city directory

When Reverend Thomas James, a missionary and freedman from New York, was granted permission by the U.S. Army in February 1865 to liberate Louisville's slave jails, he found 260 people imprisoned in Garrison's pen, "many confined in leg irons". James was essentially impressed into running the contraband camps in Louisville after he was mugged by "Missouri ruffians" on a train; when the conductor contacted the local authorities for help, the U.S. Army instead diverted James from his missionary assignment and put him to work locally:

At Louisville the government took me out of the hands of the Missionary Society to take charge of freed and refugee blacks, to visit the prisons of that commonwealth, and to set free all colored persons found confined without charge of crime. I served first under the orders of General Burbage [sic], and then under those of his successor, General Palmer...My first duty, after arranging the affairs of the [contraband] camp, was to visit the slave pens, of which there were five in the city. The largest, known as Garrison's, was located on Market Street, and to that I made my first visit. When I entered it, and was about to make a thorough inspection of it, Garrison stopped me with the insolent remark. 'I guess no nigger will go over me in this pen.' I showed him my orders, whereupon he asked time to consult the mayor. He started for the entrance, but was stopped by the guard I had stationed there. I told him he would not leave the pen until I had gone through every part of it. 'So,' said I, 'throw open your doors, or I will put you under arrest.' I found hidden away in that pen 260 colored persons, part of them in irons. I took them all to my camp, and they were free. I next called at Otterman's pen on Second Street, from which also I took a large number of slaves. A third large pen was named Clark's, and there were two smaller besides. I liberated the slaves in all of them.

Garrison died on July 29, 1863; the funeral was held at his house on Second and Main. Henry Bibb had inadvertently pre-written an obituary for Garrison 12 years earlier, in his newspaper Voice of the Fugitive, having heard in Canada an inaccurate story that Garrison had been shot in the head by one of his "slaveholding chums".

Another Soul-Driver Gone. Mr. Garrison, of Louisville, Ky., whose whole life has been spent in making brothels, prostitutes, widows, and orphans, is at last dead and gone to his just reward. In the fall of 1839 he bought and carried us, confined with irons in connection with other slaves, to the city of New Orleans and sold us. We have often witnessed his cruelty to his victims, both male and female, when they were confined with heavy irons and could not help themselves. We have heard him say that he never felt happier than when he find a female confined and applying a scourge to her back—"ah! how he liked to hear them beg and scream." He would often travel through the State of Kentucky to buy up the handsomest mulatto female slaves that he could find, without any regard to separating husbands and wives, and would, take them to New Orleans, and sell them for the basest of purposes. He kept a slave pen in the city of Louisville for several years.

== Slave jail ==
Matthew Garrison's Slave Jail
- Interactive map of Matthew Garrison's Slave Jail
- Location: Louisville, Kentucky; 38.2549°N 85.7535°W

Matthew Garrison's slave jail was located on the east side of Second Street between Main and Market, in Louisville, Kentucky. A marker was placed at the site in 1998, commemorating the local slave trade, which is believed to have trafficked between 2,500 and 4,000 enslaved Kentuckians out of the state annually.

== See also ==
- List of Kentucky slave traders
- History of slavery in Kentucky
- History of Louisville, Kentucky
- Louisville in the American Civil War
- Slave markets and slave jails in the United States
- Bibliography of the slave trade in the United States
