= Lumpkin's Jail =

Slave market in Richmond, Virginia

Coordinates: 37.536576°N 77.428534°W

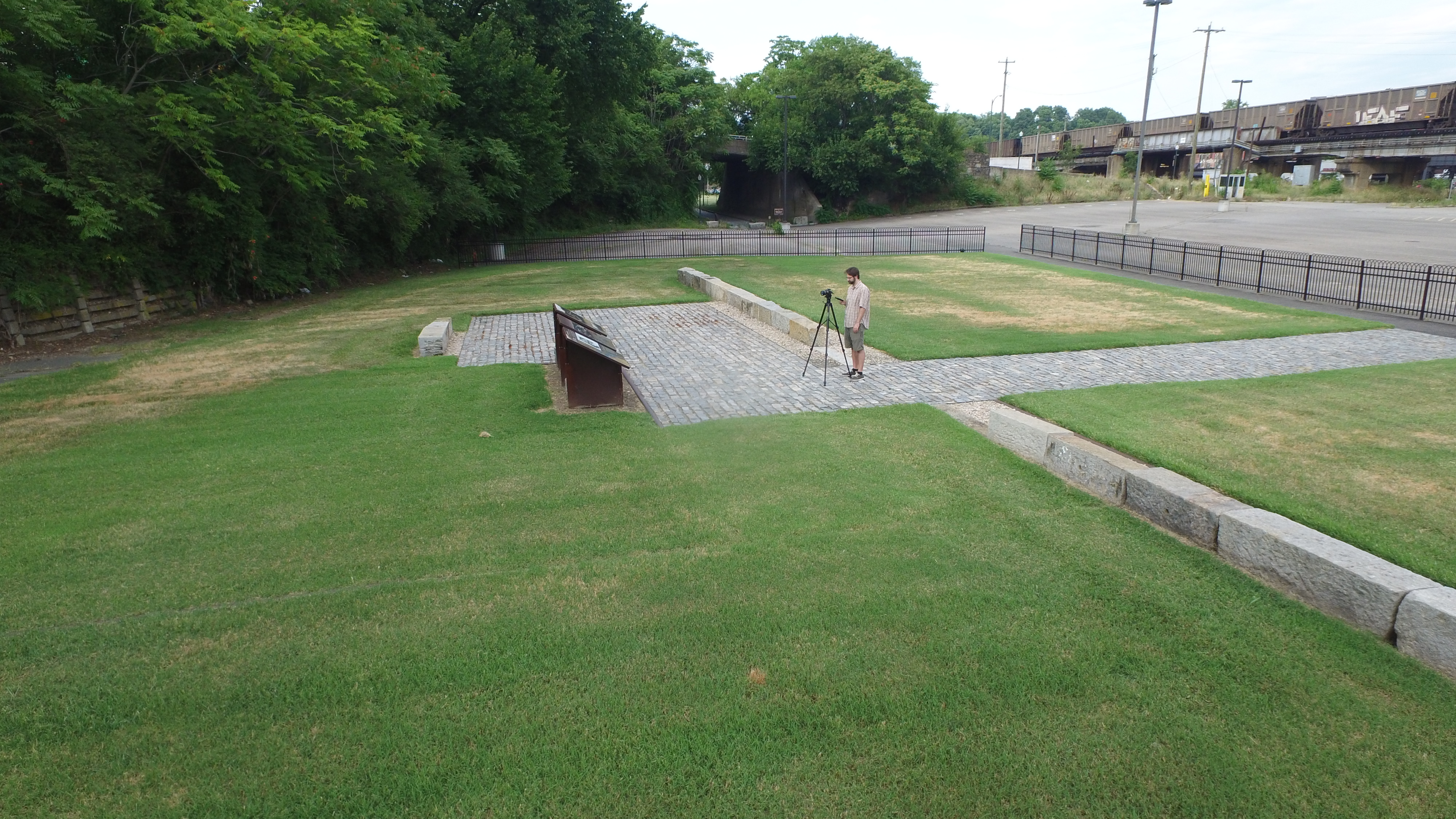

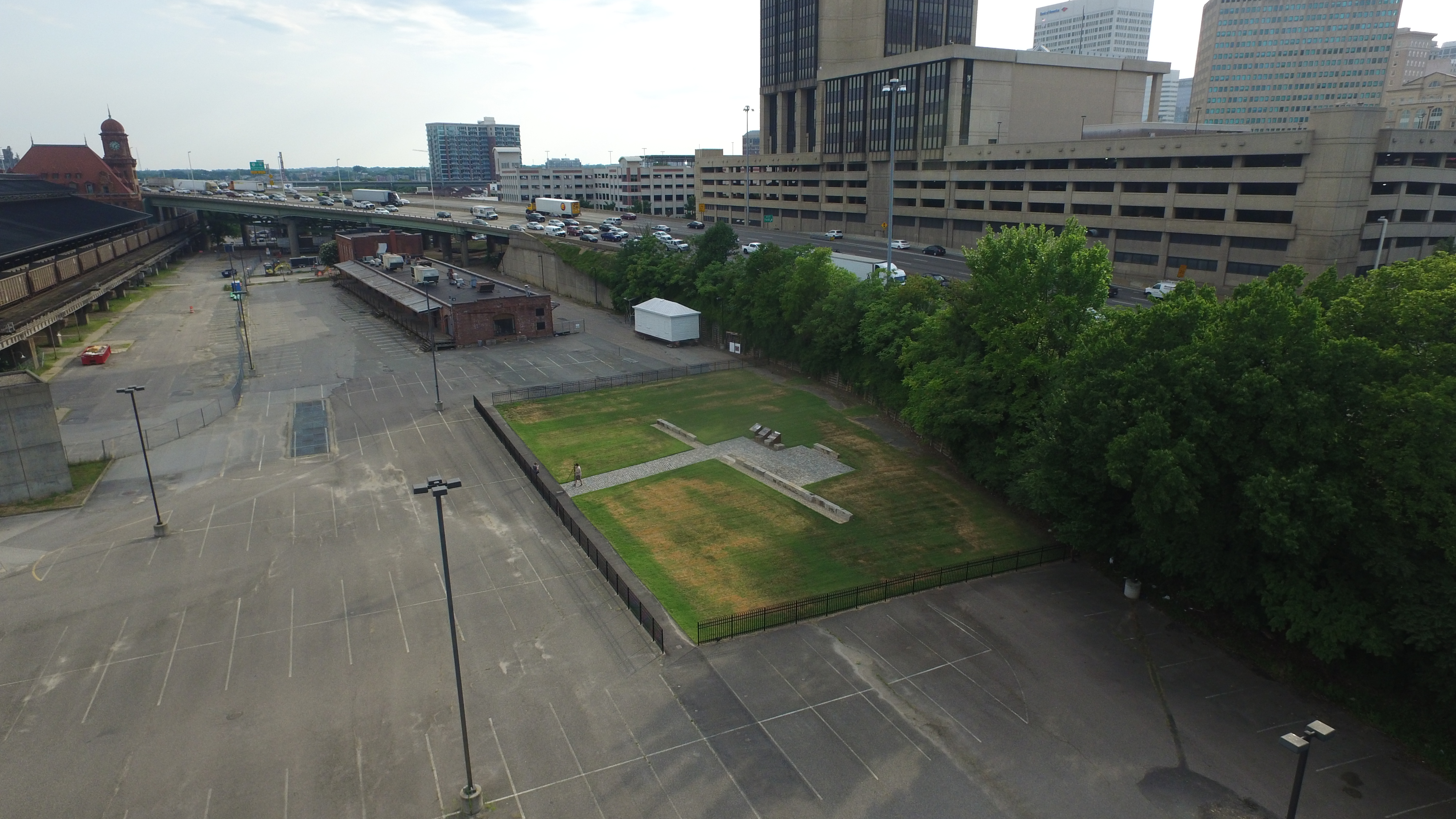

Lumpkin's Jail, also known as "the Devil's half acre", was a prominent slave-holding facility, or slave jail, and slave trading complex located in Richmond, Virginia, just three blocks from the state capitol building. More than five dozen firms traded in enslaved human beings within blocks of Richmond's Wall Street (now 15th Street) between 14th and 18th Streets between the 1830s and the end of the American Civil War. Its final and most notorious owner, Robert Lumpkin, bought and sold slaves throughout the Southern United States for well over twenty years, and Lumpkin's Jail became Richmond's largest slave-holding facility.

== History ==
Robert Lumpkin purchased three lots on Wall Street in Shockoe Bottom (named for nearby Shockoe Creek) on November 27, 1844, for roughly six thousand dollars. Although named after Lumpkin, the property had two previous owners, and the holding facility already existed. Lumpkin was also involved in the slave trade at the Birch Alley facility in Richmond. Not only the largest slave trader in Richmond at the time, Lumpkin became known for cruelty, publicly beating or torturing those who tried to escape. The "whipping room" inside the jail allowed slaves to be fastened by their wrists and ankles to iron rings while lying on the floor, and flogged. Four other lots on Wall Street (now 15th Street) contained slave jails; the area was collectively referred to as Lumpkin's Alley.

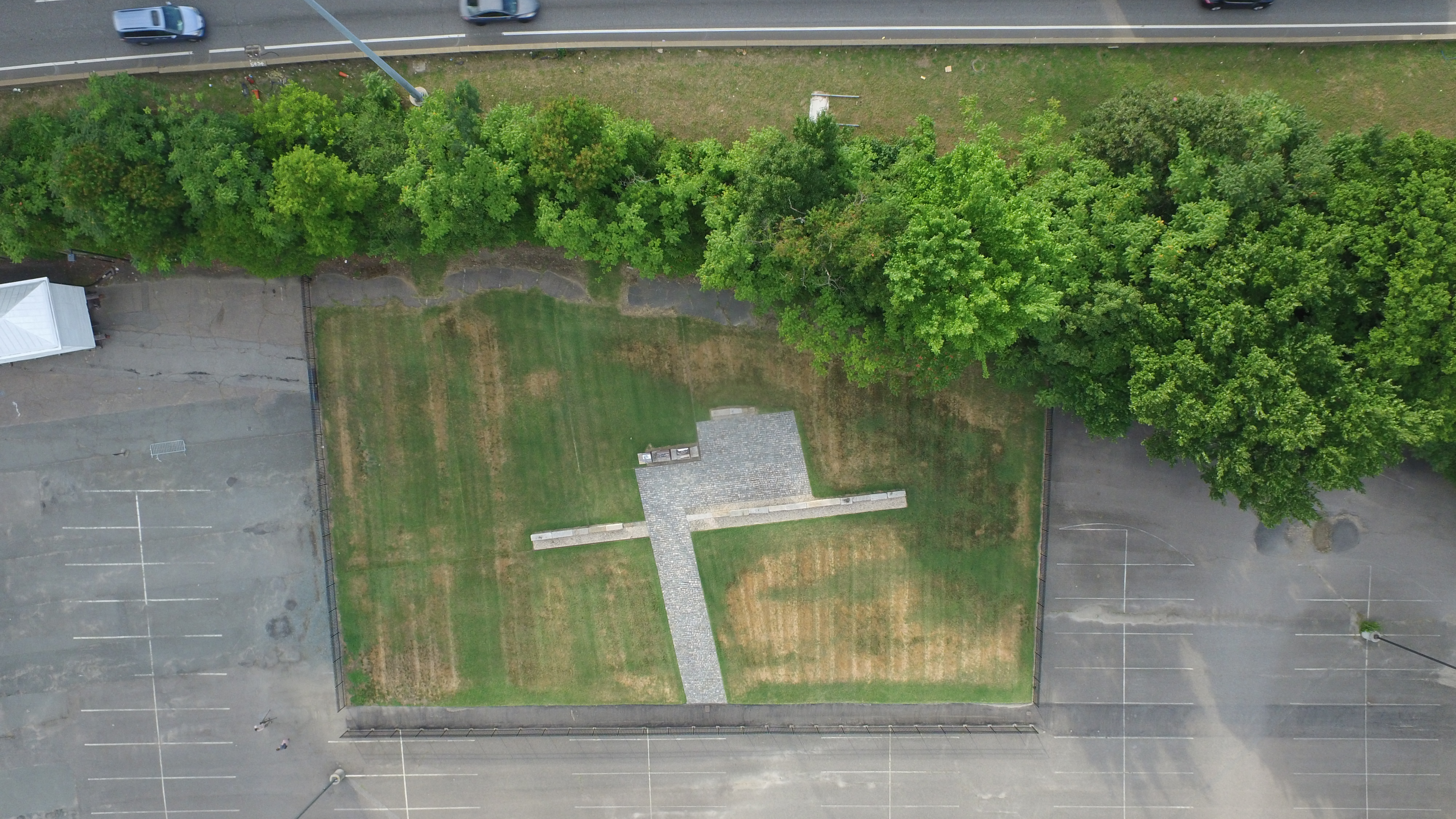

Lumpkin's Jail complex actually contained four separate buildings: Lumpkin's residence, a guest house, a kitchen/bar and the "slave pen". The two-story brick slave pen was approximately forty feet long. The bottom floor was the main jail area, and typically temporarily held men, women and children who were fit to be sold to plantation owners or other slave traders. The jail featured "barred windows, high fences, chained gates opening to the rutted streets, and all seen and smelled through a film of cooking smoke and stench of human excrement." At times, it was filled by so many slaves that they were virtually on top of one another, sometimes crammed into one room or floor and lacking toilets and outside access other than a small window. Slaves at the jail often died of disease or starvation, if not from beatings and torture. The nearby market with ready canal and railroad access was used as a slave market, or auctions were held in nearby hotels. Slaves were groomed, fed, and dressed up to be sold at auction, then pushed onto a boat or train to their next destination.

== Robert Lumpkin ==
"He was both an evil man and a family man." Robert Lumpkin, known for his cruelty and mistreatment of slaves, would eventually "marry" a light-skinned slave that he had purchased: Mary. He was 27 years older than she. He fathered five children with Mary. He treated them well and gave them the best education, even sending two of his daughters to finishing school. Before the Civil War ended, he sent his wife and children to Pennsylvania to avoid their being sold back into slavery to pay off his debts. When Lumpkin died in late 1866, he left all of his property and land to Mary, who by then was legally allowed to accept it.

== Postwar reuse ==
In April 1865, the Union Army captured Richmond, and all slaves were emancipated. In late 1866, Lumpkin died, leaving his property to Mary. In 1867, Mary Lumpkin leased the land to Nathaniel Colver, a Baptist minister looking for a place to establish a theological seminary for freedmen. The National Theological Institute, which would come to be called The Colver Institute in 1869, later called Richmond Theological Seminary, and finally Virginia Union University, used the buildings for three years, so the land once colloquially called "the Devil's half acre" became "God's half acre."

Work was begun on demolishing Lumpkin's jail on March 10, 1888, according to various newspapers. Richmond Iron Works was eventually built over the original foundation. Today the Interstate 95 embankment, as well as a parking lot for university students, cover the area. In the mid-2000s archeologists began excavating the site, digging fourteen feet into the earth before finding the jailhouse foundation. Constant saturation from the adjacent Shockoe Creek restricted aerobic bacteria which normally break down organic matter. Archeologists thus found artifacts, including clothes, shoes, toys, and books, although no whipping rings, iron bars or other artifacts typically associated with slavery remained.

== Inmates ==
Over the twenty years the Lumpkin Jail was in operation, thousands of slaves passed through the complex. The most famous inmate was Anthony Burns, who had escaped slavery in Virginia, but was arrested in Boston and tried under the Fugitive Slave Law. Though many lobbied for his release, he was sent back to Lumpkin's Jail and held for four more months until abolitionists raised sufficient funds to buy his freedom. Once freed, he returned to the North and became a pastor, but died shortly thereafter at the age of 28.

== See also ==
- Slave markets and slave jails in the United States
- List of white American slave traders who had mixed-race children with enslaved black women
