= Mary Lumpkin =

American former slave and property owner

Mary Lumpkin (1832–1905) was an American former slave and owner of the property on which stood Lumpkin's Jail, a notorious slave jail. Mary was purchased by Robert Lumpkin around 1840 and made to act as his wife. She had the first of her seven children with him at age 13; two children died as infants. Mary "reportedly told [Robert] that he could treat her however he wanted as long as their kids remained free". Two of their daughters attended a Massachusetts finishing school.

Robert purchased Lumpkin's Jail in 1844. Mary is known to have secretly provided a hymnal for escaped slave Anthony Burns, imprisoned there in 1854. Prior to the American Civil War, she and her children went to live in Philadelphia, where Mary owned a house. After the war, Robert and Mary were legally married. She attended the First African Baptist Church in Richmond, Virginia.

In 1866 Robert died and Mary inherited Lumpkin's Jail, as well as properties in Richmond; Huntsville, Alabama; and Philadelphia; she was named the executor of his will. She leased the jail property in 1867 to Nathaniel Colver, who used it to establish the Richmond Theological School for Freedmen (now Virginia Union University). The school moved to a different location by 1873 and Lumpkin sold the land.

Lumpkin operated a restaurant in New Orleans with one of her daughters. She died in 1905 in New Richmond, Ohio. She was buried in Samarian Cemetery.

A street at Virginia Union University was named in honor of Lumpkin. Author Sadeqa Johnson based the protagonist of her book Yellow Wife on her. Hakim Lucas, president of Virginia Union University, stated that "Virginia Union University is the legacy of Mary Lumpkin, but it is also the legacy of every African American woman that's alive today and has lived and struggled before for her children...Mary Lumpkin represents the highest form of the ideal of what social justice means for us in our world today".
